= 1994 Arizona Senate election =

- November 8, 1994

All 30 seats of the Arizona Senate 16 seats needed for a majority
	Majority party	Minority party
Leader	John Greene	Peter Goudinoff
Party	Republican	Democratic
Leader's seat	24th	11th
Seats before	18	12
Seats after	19	11
Seat change	▲1	▼1
- Results: Republican gain Republican hold Democratic hold
Senate President before election
John Greene
Republican
Elected Senate President
John Greene
Republican

The 1994 Arizona Senate election was held on November 8, 1994. Voters elected members of the Arizona Senate in all 30 of the state's legislative districts to serve a two-year term. Primary elections were held on September 13, 1994.

Prior to the elections, the Republicans held a majority of 18 seats over the Democrats' 12 seats.

Following the election, Republicans maintained control of the chamber with 19 Republicans to 11 Democrats, a net gain of one seat for Republicans.

The newly elected senators served in the 42nd Arizona State Legislature.

== Retiring Incumbents ==
=== Democrats ===
1. District 7: Peter Rios
2. District 14: Cindy L. Resnick
3. District 16: Stan Furman
4. District 20: Lela Alston
5. District 25: Chuck Blanchard

=== Republicans ===
1. District 17: Patricia "Pat" Wright
2. District 21: Matt Salmon
3. District 27: Bev Hermon
4. District 28: Ed Phillips
5. District 29: Lester N. Pearce

== Summary of Results by Arizona State Legislative District ==
District	Incumbent	Party	Elected Senator	Outcome
1st	Carol Springer	Rep	Carol Springer	Rep Hold
2nd	John Wettaw	Rep	John Wettaw	Rep Hold
3rd	James Henderson Jr.	Dem	James Henderson Jr.	Dem Hold
4th	A.V. "Bill" Hardt	Dem	A.V. "Bill" Hardt	Dem Hold
5th	Jim Buster	Rep	Jim Buster	Rep Hold
6th	John Huppenthal	Rep	John Huppenthal	Rep Hold
7th	Peter Rios	Dem	Robert "Bob" Chastain	Dem Hold
8th	Gus Arzberger	Dem	Gus Arzberger	Dem Hold
9th	Keith A. Bee	Rep	Keith A. Bee	Rep Hold
10th	Victor Soltero	Dem	Victor Soltero	Dem Hold
11th	Peter Goudinoff	Dem	Peter Goudinoff	Dem Hold
12th	Ann Day	Rep	Ann Day	Rep Hold
13th	Patricia A. "Patti" Noland	Rep	Patricia A. "Patti" Noland	Rep Hold
14th	Cindy L. Resnick	Dem	Ruth Solomon	Dem Hold
15th	Austin Turner	Rep	Austin Turner	Rep Hold
16th	Stan Furman	Dem	John Kaites	Rep Gain
17th	Patricia "Pat" Wright	Rep	Brenda Burns	Rep Hold
18th	Marc Spitzer	Rep	Marc Spitzer	Rep Hold
19th	Jan Brewer	Rep	Jan Brewer	Rep Hold
20th	Lela Alston	Dem	Mary Hartley	Dem Hold
21st	Matt Salmon	Rep	Stan Barnes	Rep Hold
22nd	Manuel "Lito" Peña	Dem	Manuel "Lito" Peña	Dem Hold
23rd	Sandra Kennedy	Dem	Sandra Kennedy	Dem Hold
24th	John Greene	Rep	John Greene	Rep Hold
25th	Chuck Blanchard	Dem	Chris Cummiskey	Dem Hold
26th	Tom Patterson	Rep	Tom Patterson	Rep Hold
27th	Bev Hermon	Rep	Gary Richardson	Rep Hold
28th	Ed Phillips	Rep	Randall Gnant	Rep Hold
29th	Lester N. Pearce	Rep	David Petersen	Rep Hold
30th	Larry Chesley	Rep	Larry Chesley	Rep Hold

== Detailed Results ==
=== District 1 ===
Republican primary results
Party	Candidate	Votes	%
Republican	Carol Springer (incumbent)	13,681	100.00%
Total votes		13,681	100.00%

General election results
Party	Candidate	Votes	%
Republican	Carol Springer (incumbent)	39,725	100.00%
Total votes		39,725	100.00%
Republican hold			

=== District 2 ===
Republican primary results
Party	Candidate	Votes	%
Republican	John Wettaw (incumbent)	9,197	100.00%
Total votes		9,197	100.00%

Libertarian Primary Results
Party	Candidate	Votes	%
Libertarian	Sunny Reid (Note: Ran as a write-in candidate in the primary election.)	23	100.00%
Total votes		23	100.00%

General election results
Party	Candidate	Votes	%
Republican	John Wettaw (incumbent)	33,139	80.65%
Libertarian	Sunny Reid	7,953	19.35%
Total votes		41,092	100.00%
Republican hold			

=== District 3 ===
Democratic primary results
Party	Candidate	Votes	%
Democratic	James Henderson Jr. (incumbent)	4,597	41.07%
Democratic	David J. Tsosie	2,844	25.41%
Democratic	Irving M. Billy	2,221	19.84%
Democratic	Melvin Apachee	1,530	13.67%
Total votes		11,192	100.00%

General election results
Party	Candidate	Votes	%
Democratic	James Henderson Jr. (incumbent)	23,487	99.32%
Republican	Charles H. Young (Note: Ran as a write-in candidate in the general election.)	161	0.68%
Total votes		23,648	100.00%
Democratic hold			

=== District 4 ===
Democratic primary results
Party	Candidate	Votes	%
Democratic	A. V. "Bill" Hardt (incumbent)	12,705	100.00%
Total votes		12,705	100.00%

General election results
Party	Candidate	Votes	%
Democratic	A. V. "Bill" Hardt (incumbent)	26,288	100.00%
Total votes		26,288	100.00%
Democratic hold			

=== District 5 ===
Democratic primary results
Party	Candidate	Votes	%
Democratic	Jim Wombacher	5,308	100.00%
Total votes		5,308	100.00%

Republican primary results
Party	Candidate	Votes	%
Republican	Jim Buster (incumbent)	4,911	100.00%
Total votes		4,911	100.00%

General election results
Party	Candidate	Votes	%
Republican	Jim Buster (incumbent)	16,240	65.12%
Democratic	Jim Wombacher	8,700	34.88%
Total votes		24,940	100.00%
Republican hold			

=== District 6 ===
Republican primary results
Party	Candidate	Votes	%
Republican	John Huppenthal (incumbent)	9,884	100.00%
Total votes		9,884	100.00%

Libertarian Primary Results
Party	Candidate	Votes	%
Libertarian	Gregg Tivnan	14	100.00%
Total votes		14	100.00%

General election results
Party	Candidate	Votes	%
Republican	John Huppenthal (incumbent)	33,992	82.27%
Libertarian	Gregg Tivnan	7,328	17.73%
Total votes		41,320	100.00%
Republican hold			

=== District 7 ===
Democratic primary results
Party	Candidate	Votes	%
Democratic	Robert "Bob" Chastain	8,227	100.00%
Total votes		8,227	100.00%

Republican primary results
Party	Candidate	Votes	%
Republican	Roger Hooper	3,293	100.00%
Total votes		3,293	100.00%

General election results
Party	Candidate	Votes	%
Democratic	Robert "Bob" Chastain	13,131	53.46%
Republican	Roger Hooper	11,429	46.54%
Total votes		24,560	100.00%
Democratic hold			

=== District 8 ===
Democratic primary results
Party	Candidate	Votes	%
Democratic	Gus Arzberger (incumbent)	9,334	100.00%
Total votes		9,334	100.00%

General election results
Party	Candidate	Votes	%
Democratic	Gus Arzberger (incumbent)	17,979	100.00%
Total votes		17,979	100.00%
Democratic hold			

=== District 9 ===
Democratic primary results
Party	Candidate	Votes	%
Democratic	John E. Dougherty	7,282	100.00%
Total votes		7,282	100.00%

Republican primary results
Party	Candidate	Votes	%
Republican	Keith A. Bee (incumbent)	11,815	100.00%
Total votes		11,815	100.00%

General election results
Party	Candidate	Votes	%
Republican	Keith A. Bee (incumbent)	28,646	62.83%
Democratic	John E. Dougherty	16,947	37.17%
Total votes		45,593	100.00%
Republican hold			

=== District 10 ===
Democratic primary results
Party	Candidate	Votes	%
Democratic	Victor Soltero (incumbent)	5,086	100.00%
Total votes		5,086	100.00%

General election results
Party	Candidate	Votes	%
Democratic	Victor Soltero (incumbent)	14,759	100.00%
Total votes		14,759	100.00%
Democratic hold			

=== District 11 ===
Democratic primary results
Party	Candidate	Votes	%
Democratic	Peter Goudinoff (incumbent)	6,527	100.00%
Total votes		6,527	100.00%

Libertarian Primary Results
Party	Candidate	Votes	%
Libertarian	Scott Stewart	1	100.00%
Total votes		1	100.00%

General election results
Party	Candidate	Votes	%
Democratic	Peter Goudinoff (incumbent)	18,496	77.18%
Libertarian	Scott Stewart	5,468	22.82%
Total votes		23,964	100.00%
Democratic hold			

=== District 12 ===
Republican primary results
Party	Candidate	Votes	%
Republican	Ann Day (incumbent)	10,631	100.00%
Total votes		10,631	100.00%

Libertarian Primary Results
Party	Candidate	Votes	%
Libertarian	Roberta McMillan	4	100.00%
Total votes		4	100.00%

General election results
Party	Candidate	Votes	%
Republican	Ann Day (incumbent)	38,838	83.39%
Libertarian	Roberta McMillan	7,738	16.61%
Total votes		46,576	100.00%
Republican hold			

=== District 13 ===
Republican primary results
Party	Candidate	Votes	%
Republican	Patricia A. "Patti" Noland (incumbent)	9,738	100.00%
Total votes		9,738	100.00%

Libertarian Primary Results
Party	Candidate	Votes	%
Libertarian	Wes Thompson	11	100.00%
Total votes		11	100.00%

General election results
Party	Candidate	Votes	%
Republican	Patricia A. "Patti" Noland (incumbent)	36,720	83.30%
Libertarian	Wes Thompson	7,362	16.70%
Total votes		44,082	100.00%
Republican hold			

=== District 14 ===
Democratic primary results
Party	Candidate	Votes	%
Democratic	Ruth Solomon	7,472	100.00%
Total votes		7,472	100.00%

Libertarian Primary Results
Party	Candidate	Votes	%
Libertarian	Douglas F. Newman	2	100.00%
Total votes		2	100.00%

General election results
Party	Candidate	Votes	%
Democratic	Ruth Solomon	26,960	77.79%
Libertarian	Douglas F. Newman	7,699	22.21%
Total votes		34,659	100.00%
Democratic hold			

=== District 15 ===
Republican primary results
Party	Candidate	Votes	%
Republican	Austin Turner (incumbent)	11,517	100.00%
Total votes		11,517	100.00%

Libertarian Primary Results
Party	Candidate	Votes	%
Libertarian	Lon S. Weber	7	100.00%
Total votes		7	100.00%

General election results
Party	Candidate	Votes	%
Republican	Austin Turner (incumbent)	30,181	80.38%
Libertarian	Lon S. Weber	7,369	19.62%
Total votes		37,550	100.00%
Republican hold			

=== District 16 ===
- Democratic Senator Stan Furman did not seek reelection and no other Democrat ran in the district; therefore, it was an automatic pick-up for the Republicans.

Republican primary results
Party	Candidate	Votes	%
Republican	John Kaites	8,911	100.00%
Total votes		8,911	100.00%

Libertarian Primary Results
Party	Candidate	Votes	%
Libertarian	Dean C. Pleasant	12	100.00%
Total votes		12	100.00%

General election results
Party	Candidate	Votes	%
Republican	John Kaites	25,713	78.18%
Libertarian	Dean C. Pleasant	7,175	21.82%
Total votes		32,888	100.00%
Republican gain from Democratic			

=== District 17 ===
Republican primary results
Party	Candidate	Votes	%
Republican	Brenda Burns	10,661	100.00%
Total votes		10,661	100.00%

Libertarian Primary Results
Party	Candidate	Votes	%
Libertarian	Rick Tompkins	211	100.00%
Total votes		211	100.00%

General election results
Party	Candidate	Votes	%
Republican	Brenda Burns	28,393	79.78%
Libertarian	Rick Tompkins	7,195	20.22%
Total votes		35,588	100.00%
Republican hold			

=== District 18 ===
Republican primary results
Party	Candidate	Votes	%
Republican	Marc Spitzer (incumbent)	11,324	100.00%
Total votes		11,324	100.00%

Libertarian Primary Results
Party	Candidate	Votes	%
Libertarian	Donna Hancock	11	100.00%
Total votes		11	100.00%

General election results
Party	Candidate	Votes	%
Republican	Marc Spitzer (incumbent)	26,413	73.12%
Libertarian	Donna Hancock	9,708	26.88%
Total votes		36,121	100.00%
Republican hold			

=== District 19 ===
Republican primary results
Party	Candidate	Votes	%
Republican	Jan Brewer (incumbent)	10,798	100.00%
Total votes		10,798	100.00%

General election results
Party	Candidate	Votes	%
Republican	Jan Brewer (incumbent)	29,624	100.00%
Total votes		29,624	100.00%
Republican hold			

=== District 20 ===
Democratic primary results
Party	Candidate	Votes	%
Democratic	Mary Hartley	3,394	54.81%
Democratic	Cynthia Schwartz	2,798	45.19%
Total votes		6,192	100.00%

Republican primary results
Party	Candidate	Votes	%
Republican	David McElhone	4,250	100.00%
Total votes		4,250	100.00%

Libertarian Primary Results
Party	Candidate	Votes	%
Libertarian	Richard Lee Duncan	171	100.00%
Total votes		171	100.00%

General election results
Party	Candidate	Votes	%
Democratic	Mary Hartley	11,960	52.18%
Republican	David McElhone	9,486	41.38%
Libertarian	Richard Lee Duncan	1,476	6.44%
Total votes		22,922	100.00%
Democratic hold			

=== District 21 ===
Democratic primary results
Party	Candidate	Votes	%
Democratic	Fernando P. "Fred" Abreu	157	100.00%
Total votes		157	100.00%

Republican primary results
Party	Candidate	Votes	%
Republican	Stan Barnes	7,743	64.43%
Republican	Tom Wilkinson	4,275	35.57%
Total votes		12,018	100.00%

General election results
Party	Candidate	Votes	%
Republican	Stan Barnes	25,808	100.00%
Total votes		25,808	100.00%
Republican hold			

=== District 22 ===
Democratic primary results
Party	Candidate	Votes	%
Democratic	Manuel "Lito" Peña (incumbent)	4,033	100.00%
Total votes		4,033	100.00%

Libertarian Primary Results
Party	Candidate	Votes	%
Libertarian	Jack C. Gunn	4	100.00%
Total votes		4	100.00%

General election results
Party	Candidate	Votes	%
Democratic	Manuel "Lito" Peña (incumbent)	9,246	73.30%
Libertarian	Jack C. Gunn	3,362	26.65%
Democratic	Willie Billy Horton	6	0.05%
Total votes		12,614	100.00%
Democratic hold			

=== District 23 ===
Democratic primary results
Party	Candidate	Votes	%
Democratic	Sandra Kennedy (incumbent)	5,651	100.00%
Total votes		5,651	100.00%

Republican primary results
Party	Candidate	Votes	%
Republican	William "Wink" Wiess	1,243	100.00%
Total votes		1,243	100.00%

General election results
Party	Candidate	Votes	%
Democratic	Sandra Kennedy (incumbent)	10,613	75.51%
Republican	William "Wink" Wiess	3,442	24.49%
Independent	Bradley Cashman	1	0.01%
Total votes		14,056	100.00%
Democratic hold			

=== District 24 ===
Republican primary results
Party	Candidate	Votes	%
Republican	John Greene (incumbent)	10,189	100.00%
Total votes		10,189	100.00%

Libertarian Primary Results
Party	Candidate	Votes	%
Libertarian	William T. Hosea	196	100.00%
Total votes		196	100.00%

General election results
Party	Candidate	Votes	%
Republican	John Greene (incumbent)	29,092	80.25%
Libertarian	William T. Hosea	7,158	19.75%
Total votes		36,250	100.00%
Republican hold			

=== District 25 ===
Democratic primary results
Party	Candidate	Votes	%
Democratic	Chris Cummiskey	7,767	100.00%
Total votes		7,767	100.00%

Republican primary results
Party	Candidate	Votes	%
Republican	Obey Frank Bledsoe	3,529	50.11%
Republican	Bernie Truter (Note: Despite finishing in second in the Republican primary behind Obey Frank Bledsoe, Bernie Truter would advance as the Republican nominee in the general election.)	3,514	49.89%
Total votes		7,043	100.00%

Libertarian Primary Results
Party	Candidate	Votes	%
Libertarian	John Williams	219	100.00%
Total votes		219	100.00%

General election results
Party	Candidate	Votes	%
Democratic	Chris Cummiskey	17,943	55.94%
Republican	Bernie Truter	11,651	36.32%
Libertarian	John Williams	2,481	7.73%
Total votes		32,075	100.00%
Democratic hold			

=== District 26 ===
Democratic primary results
Party	Candidate	Votes	%
Democratic	William E. "Bill" Hegarty	6,430	100.00%
Total votes		6,430	100.00%

Republican primary results
Party	Candidate	Votes	%
Republican	Thomas Patterson (incumbent)	12,195	100.00%
Total votes		12,195	100.00%

General election results
Party	Candidate	Votes	%
Republican	Thomas Patterson (incumbent)	26,570	64.00%
Democratic	William E. "Bill" Hegarty	14,946	36.00%
Total votes		41,516	100.00%
Republican hold			

=== District 27 ===
Republican primary results
Party	Candidate	Votes	%
Republican	Gary Richardson	9,670	100.00%
Total votes		9,670	100.00%

General election results
Party	Candidate	Votes	%
Republican	Gary Richardson	23,668	100.00%
Total votes		23,668	100.00%
Republican hold			

=== District 28 ===
Democratic primary results
Party	Candidate	Votes	%
Democratic	Paul Privateer	5,019	100.00%
Total votes		5,019	100.00%

Republican primary results
Party	Candidate	Votes	%
Republican	Randall Gnant	14,858	100.00%
Total votes		14,858	100.00%

General election results
Party	Candidate	Votes	%
Republican	Randall Gnant	37,961	71.27%
Democratic	Paul Privateer	15,301	28.73%
Total votes		53,262	100.00%
Republican hold			

=== District 29 ===
Democratic primary results
Party	Candidate	Votes	%
Democratic	Jerry Helmstadter	3,481	100.00%
Total votes		3,481	100.00%

Republican primary results
Party	Candidate	Votes	%
Republican	David Petersen	5,410	57.18%
Republican	E. L. "Buzz" Shahan	4,052	42.82%
Total votes		9,462	100.00%

General election results
Party	Candidate	Votes	%
Republican	David Petersen	17,269	67.40%
Democratic	Jerry Helmstadter	8,353	32.60%
Total votes		25,622	100.00%
Republican hold			

=== District 30 ===
Republican primary results
Party	Candidate	Votes	%
Republican	Larry Chesley (incumbent)	11,938	100.00%
Total votes		11,938	100.00%

Libertarian Primary Results
Party	Candidate	Votes	%
Libertarian	David Lawrence Janecek	13	100.00%
Total votes		13	100.00%

General election results
Party	Candidate	Votes	%
Republican	Larry Chesley (incumbent)	30,846	80.04%
Libertarian	David Lawrence Janecek	7,693	19.96%
Total votes		38,539	100.00%
Republican hold			
