= 1996 Arizona Senate election =

- November 5, 1996

All 30 seats of the Arizona Senate 16 seats needed for a majority
| | Majority party | Minority party |
|---|---|---|
| Leader | Brenda Burns | Jack A. Brown |
| Party | Republican | Democratic |
| Leader's seat | 17th | 4th |
| Seats before | 19 | 11 |
| Seats after | 18 | 12 |
| Seat change | ▼1 | ▲1 |
- Results: Democratic gain Republican hold Democratic hold
Senate President before election
John Greene
Republican
Elected Senate President
Brenda Burns
Republican

The 1996 Arizona Senate election was held on November 5, 1996. Voters elected members of the Arizona Senate in all 30 of the state's legislative districts to serve a two-year term. Primary elections were held on September 10, 1996.

Prior to the elections, the Republicans held a majority of 19 seats over the Democrats' 11 seats.

Following the election, Republicans maintained control of the chamber with 18 Republicans to 12 Democrats, a net gain of one seat for Democrats.

The newly elected senators served in the 43rd Arizona State Legislature.

In January 1997, Senator Brenda Burns became the first woman elected President of the Arizona State Senate.

== Retiring Incumbents ==
=== Democrats ===
1. District 4: A.V. "Bill" Hardt
2. District 11: Peter Goudinoff
3. District 22: Manuel "Lito" Peña

=== Republicans ===
1. District 5: Jim Buster
2. District 13: Patricia A. "Patti" Noland
3. District 15: Austin Turner
4. District 19: Jan Brewer
5. District 21: Stan Barnes
6. District 24: John Greene
7. District 30: Larry Chesley

== Incumbent Defeated in Primary Election ==
=== Democrat ===
1. District 7: Robert "Bob" Chastain

== Summary of Results by Arizona State Legislative District ==
| District | Incumbent | Party | Elected Senator | Outcome |
|---|---|---|---|---|
| 1st | Carol Springer | Rep | Carol Springer | Rep Hold |
| 2nd | John Wettaw | Rep | John Wettaw | Rep Hold |
| 3rd | James Henderson Jr. | Dem | James Henderson Jr. | Dem Hold |
| 4th | A.V. "Bill" Hardt | Dem | Jack A. Brown | Dem Hold |
| 5th | Jim Buster | Rep | Pat Conner | Rep Hold |
| 6th | John Huppenthal | Rep | John Huppenthal | Rep Hold |
| 7th | Robert "Bob" Chastain | Dem | Peter Rios | Dem Hold |
| 8th | Gus Arzberger | Dem | Gus Arzberger | Dem Hold |
| 9th | Keith A. Bee | Rep | Keith A. Bee | Rep Hold |
| 10th | Victor Soltero | Dem | Victor Soltero | Dem Hold |
| 11th | Peter Goudinoff | Dem | Elaine Richardson | Dem Hold |
| 12th | Ann Day | Rep | Ann Day | Rep Hold |
| 13th | Patricia A. "Patti" Noland | Rep | George Cunningham | Dem Gain |
| 14th | Ruth Solomon | Dem | Ruth Solomon | Dem Hold |
| 15th | Austin Turner | Rep | Edward Cirillo | Rep Hold |
| 16th | John Kaites | Rep | John Kaites | Rep Hold |
| 17th | Brenda Burns | Rep | Brenda Burns | Rep Hold |
| 18th | Marc Spitzer | Rep | Marc Spitzer | Rep Hold |
| 19th | Jan Brewer | Rep | Scott Bundgaard | Rep Hold |
| 20th | Mary Hartley | Dem | Mary Hartley | Dem Hold |
| 21st | Stan Barnes | Rep | Russell "Rusty" Bowers | Rep Hold |
| 22nd | Manuel "Lito" Peña | Dem | Joe Eddie Lopez | Dem Hold |
| 23rd | Sandra Kennedy | Dem | Sandra Kennedy | Dem Hold |
| 24th | John Greene | Rep | Sue Grace | Rep Hold |
| 25th | Chris Cummiskey | Dem | Chris Cummiskey | Dem Hold |
| 26th | Tom Patterson | Rep | Tom Patterson | Rep Hold |
| 27th | Gary Richardson | Rep | Gary Richardson | Rep Hold |
| 28th | Randall Gnant | Rep | Randall Gnant | Rep Hold |
| 29th | David Petersen | Rep | David Petersen | Rep Hold |
| 30th | Larry Chesley | Rep | Tom Freestone | Rep Hold |

== Detailed Results ==
=== District 1 ===
Republican primary results
| Party | Candidate | Votes | % |
|---|---|---|---|
| Republican | Carol Springer (incumbent) | 14,337 | 100.00% |
| Total votes | | 14,337 | 100.00% |

General election results
| Party | Candidate | Votes | % |
|---|---|---|---|
| Republican | Carol Springer (incumbent) | 46,614 | 100.00% |
| Total votes | | 46,614 | 100.00% |
| Republican hold | | | |

=== District 2 ===
Republican primary results
| Party | Candidate | Votes | % |
|---|---|---|---|
| Republican | John Wettaw (incumbent) | 9,044 | 100.00% |
| Total votes | | 9,044 | 100.00% |

General election results
| Party | Candidate | Votes | % |
|---|---|---|---|
| Republican | John Wettaw (incumbent) | 38,460 | 100.00% |
| Total votes | | 38,460 | 100.00% |
| Republican hold | | | |

=== District 3 ===
Democratic primary results
| Party | Candidate | Votes | % |
|---|---|---|---|
| Democratic | James Henderson Jr. (incumbent) | 8,753 | 77.60% |
| Democratic | Melvin C. Apachee | 2,526 | 22.40% |
| Total votes | | 11,279 | 100.00% |

Republican primary results
| Party | Candidate | Votes | % |
|---|---|---|---|
| Republican | Tom Gordon | 2,294 | 100.00% |
| Total votes | | 2,294 | 100.00% |

General election results
| Party | Candidate | Votes | % |
|---|---|---|---|
| Democratic | James Henderson Jr. (incumbent) | 26,426 | 75.20% |
| Republican | Tom Gordon | 8,716 | 24.80% |
| Total votes | | 35,142 | 100.00% |
| Democratic hold | | | |

=== District 4 ===
Democratic primary results
| Party | Candidate | Votes | % |
|---|---|---|---|
| Democratic | Jack A. Brown | 12,384 | 100.00% |
| Total votes | | 12,384 | 100.00% |

Republican primary results
| Party | Candidate | Votes | % |
|---|---|---|---|
| Republican | David Christian Farnsworth | 7,386 | 100.00% |
| Total votes | | 7,386 | 100.00% |

General election results
| Party | Candidate | Votes | % |
|---|---|---|---|
| Democratic | Jack A. Brown | 26,573 | 54.43% |
| Republican | David Christian Farnsworth | 22,244 | 45.57% |
| Total votes | | 48,817 | 100.00% |
| Democratic hold | | | |

=== District 5 ===
Democratic primary results
| Party | Candidate | Votes | % |
|---|---|---|---|
| Democratic | Harry W. Warrington | 4,524 | 100.00% |
| Total votes | | 4,524 | 100.00% |

Republican primary results
| Party | Candidate | Votes | % |
|---|---|---|---|
| Republican | Pat Conner | 6,009 | 100.00% |
| Total votes | | 6,009 | 100.00% |

General election results
| Party | Candidate | Votes | % |
|---|---|---|---|
| Republican | Pat Conner | 21,102 | 66.14% |
| Democratic | Harry W. Warrington | 10,803 | 33.86% |
| Total votes | | 31,905 | 100.00% |
| Republican hold | | | |

=== District 6 ===
Republican primary results
| Party | Candidate | Votes | % |
|---|---|---|---|
| Republican | John F. Huppenthal (incumbent) | 7,633 | 100.00% |
| Total votes | | 7,633 | 100.00% |

General election results
| Party | Candidate | Votes | % |
|---|---|---|---|
| Republican | John F. Huppenthal (incumbent) | 46,946 | 100.00% |
| Total votes | | 46,946 | 100.00% |
| Republican hold | | | |

=== District 7 ===
Democratic primary results
| Party | Candidate | Votes | % |
|---|---|---|---|
| Democratic | Pete Rios | 5,062 | 53.77% |
| Democratic | Robert "Bob" Chastain (incumbent) | 4,352 | 46.23% |
| Total votes | | 9,414 | 100.00% |

General election results
| Party | Candidate | Votes | % |
|---|---|---|---|
| Democratic | Pete Rios | 19,705 | 100.00% |
| Total votes | | 19,705 | 100.00% |
| Democratic hold | | | |

=== District 8 ===
Democratic primary results
| Party | Candidate | Votes | % |
|---|---|---|---|
| Democratic | Gus Arzberger (incumbent) | 10,330 | 100.00% |
| Total votes | | 10,330 | 100.00% |

General election results
| Party | Candidate | Votes | % |
|---|---|---|---|
| Democratic | Gus Arzberger (incumbent) | 20,891 | 100.00% |
| Total votes | | 20,891 | 100.00% |
| Democratic hold | | | |

=== District 9 ===
Republican primary results
| Party | Candidate | Votes | % |
|---|---|---|---|
| Republican | Keith A. Bee (incumbent) | 11,642 | 100.00% |
| Total votes | | 11,642 | 100.00% |

General election results
| Party | Candidate | Votes | % |
|---|---|---|---|
| Republican | Keith A. Bee (incumbent) | 32,265 | 100.00% |
| Total votes | | 32,265 | 100.00% |
| Republican hold | | | |

=== District 10 ===
Democratic primary results
| Party | Candidate | Votes | % |
|---|---|---|---|
| Democratic | Victor Soltero (incumbent) | 5,969 | 100.00% |
| Total votes | | 5,969 | 100.00% |

General election results
| Party | Candidate | Votes | % |
|---|---|---|---|
| Democratic | Victor Soltero (incumbent) | 16,540 | 100.00% |
| Total votes | | 16,540 | 100.00% |
| Democratic hold | | | |

=== District 11 ===
Democratic primary results
| Party | Candidate | Votes | % |
|---|---|---|---|
| Democratic | Elaine Richardson | 5,900 | 58.99% |
| Democratic | Jorge Luis Garcia | 4,102 | 41.01% |
| Total votes | | 10,002 | 100.00% |

Republican primary results
| Party | Candidate | Votes | % |
|---|---|---|---|
| Republican | David C. Morales | 2,473 | 100.00% |
| Total votes | | 2,473 | 100.00% |

Libertarian Primary Results
| Party | Candidate | Votes | % |
|---|---|---|---|
| Libertarian | Floyd H. Peterson (Note: Ran as a write-in candidate in the primary election.) | 7 | 100.00% |
| Total votes | | 7 | 100.00% |

General election results
| Party | Candidate | Votes | % |
|---|---|---|---|
| Democratic | Elaine Richardson | 21,286 | 66.67% |
| Republican | David C. Morales | 10,640 | 33.32% |
| Unknown | D. Tapia (Note: Ran as a write-in candidate in the general election.) | 3 | 0.01% |
| Total votes | | 31,929 | 100.00% |
| Democratic hold | | | |

=== District 12 ===
Republican primary results
| Party | Candidate | Votes | % |
|---|---|---|---|
| Republican | Ann Day (incumbent) | 10,899 | 100.00% |
| Total votes | | 10,899 | 100.00% |

General election results
| Party | Candidate | Votes | % |
|---|---|---|---|
| Republican | Ann Day (incumbent) | 26,795 | 100.00% |
| Total votes | | 26,795 | 100.00% |
| Republican hold | | | |

=== District 13 ===
Democratic primary results
| Party | Candidate | Votes | % |
|---|---|---|---|
| Democratic | George Cunningham | 7,760 | 100.00% |
| Total votes | | 7,760 | 100.00% |

Republican primary results
| Party | Candidate | Votes | % |
|---|---|---|---|
| Republican | David W. Turner | 7,925 | 100.00% |
| Total votes | | 7,925 | 100.00% |

General election results
| Party | Candidate | Votes | % |
|---|---|---|---|
| Democratic | George Cunningham | 28,849 | 58.89% |
| Republican | David W. Turner | 20,139 | 41.11% |
| Total votes | | 48,988 | 100.00% |
| Democratic gain from Republican | | | |

=== District 14 ===
Democratic primary results
| Party | Candidate | Votes | % |
|---|---|---|---|
| Democratic | Ruth Solomon (incumbent) | 6,594 | 100.00% |
| Total votes | | 6,594 | 100.00% |

Republican primary results
| Party | Candidate | Votes | % |
|---|---|---|---|
| Republican | James C. Kisner | 5,715 | 100.00% |
| Total votes | | 5,715 | 100.00% |

General election results
| Party | Candidate | Votes | % |
|---|---|---|---|
| Democratic | Ruth Solomon (incumbent) | 25,750 | 63.25% |
| Republican | James C. Kisner | 14,962 | 36.75% |
| Total votes | | 40,712 | 100.00% |
| Democratic hold | | | |

=== District 15 ===
Democratic primary results
| Party | Candidate | Votes | % |
|---|---|---|---|
| Democratic | J. C. Galaviz | 396 | 100.00% |
| Total votes | | 396 | 100.00% |

Republican primary results
| Party | Candidate | Votes | % |
|---|---|---|---|
| Republican | Edward J. Cirillo | 4,685 | 38.88% |
| Republican | Sandy Reagan | 3,375 | 28.01% |
| Republican | Mike Denea | 2,239 | 18.58% |
| Republican | E. Marie Hammond | 1,751 | 14.53% |
| Total votes | | 12,050 | 100.00% |

General election results
| Party | Candidate | Votes | % |
|---|---|---|---|
| Republican | Edward J. Cirillo | 31,841 | 62.27% |
| Democratic | J. C. Galaviz | 19,293 | 37.73% |
| Total votes | | 51,134 | 100.00% |
| Republican hold | | | |

=== District 16 ===
Democratic primary results
| Party | Candidate | Votes | % |
|---|---|---|---|
| Democratic | Dorothy C. "Hankins" Schultz | 2,582 | 100.00% |
| Total votes | | 2,582 | 100.00% |

Republican primary results
| Party | Candidate | Votes | % |
|---|---|---|---|
| Republican | John Kaites (incumbent) | 6,764 | 100.00% |
| Total votes | | 6,764 | 100.00% |

General election results
| Party | Candidate | Votes | % |
|---|---|---|---|
| Republican | John Kaites (incumbent) | 24,515 | 59.77% |
| Democratic | Dorothy C. "Hankins" Schultz | 16,501 | 40.23% |
| Total votes | | 41,016 | 100.00% |
| Republican hold | | | |

=== District 17 ===
Republican primary results
| Party | Candidate | Votes | % |
|---|---|---|---|
| Republican | Brenda Burns (incumbent) | 9,020 | 100.00% |
| Total votes | | 9,020 | 100.00% |

General election results
| Party | Candidate | Votes | % |
|---|---|---|---|
| Republican | Brenda Burns (incumbent) | 36,378 | 100.00% |
| Total votes | | 36,378 | 100.00% |
| Republican hold | | | |

=== District 18 ===
Democratic primary results
| Party | Candidate | Votes | % |
|---|---|---|---|
| Democratic | Don Peters | 3,065 | 100.00% |
| Total votes | | 3,065 | 100.00% |

Republican primary results
| Party | Candidate | Votes | % |
|---|---|---|---|
| Republican | Marc Spitzer (incumbent) | 10,077 | 100.00% |
| Total votes | | 10,077 | 100.00% |

Libertarian Primary Results
| Party | Candidate | Votes | % |
|---|---|---|---|
| Libertarian | Donna Hancock | 53 | 100.00% |
| Total votes | | 53 | 100.00% |

General election results
| Party | Candidate | Votes | % |
|---|---|---|---|
| Republican | Marc Spitzer (incumbent) | 28,352 | 61.48% |
| Democratic | Don Peters | 14,870 | 32.25% |
| Libertarian | Donna Hancock | 2,891 | 6.27% |
| Total votes | | 46,113 | 100.00% |
| Republican hold | | | |

=== District 19 ===
Democratic primary results
| Party | Candidate | Votes | % |
|---|---|---|---|
| Democratic | Gerard E. "Jerry" Gower | 2,714 | 100.00% |
| Total votes | | 2,714 | 100.00% |

Republican primary results
| Party | Candidate | Votes | % |
|---|---|---|---|
| Republican | Scott Bundgaard | 5,852 | 53.66% |
| Republican | John Hughes | 4,049 | 37.13% |
| Republican | Mark McFadden | 1,005 | 9.22% |
| Total votes | | 10,906 | 100.00% |

General election results
| Party | Candidate | Votes | % |
|---|---|---|---|
| Republican | Scott Bundgaard | 36,200 | 64.40% |
| Democratic | Gerard E. "Jerry" Gower | 20,015 | 35.60% |
| Total votes | | 56,215 | 100.00% |
| Republican hold | | | |

=== District 20 ===
Democratic primary results
| Party | Candidate | Votes | % |
|---|---|---|---|
| Democratic | Mary Hartley (incumbent) | 3,142 | 100.00% |
| Total votes | | 3,142 | 100.00% |

Republican primary results
| Party | Candidate | Votes | % |
|---|---|---|---|
| Republican | Deanna Sparks | 3,013 | 100.00% |
| Total votes | | 3,013 | 100.00% |

Libertarian Primary Results
| Party | Candidate | Votes | % |
|---|---|---|---|
| Libertarian | Richard Lee Duncan | 38 | 100.00% |
| Total votes | | 171 | 100.00% |

General election results
| Party | Candidate | Votes | % |
|---|---|---|---|
| Democratic | Mary Hartley (incumbent) | 15,301 | 58.73% |
| Republican | Deanna Sparks | 9,401 | 36.08% |
| Libertarian | Richard Lee Duncan | 1,352 | 5.19% |
| Total votes | | 26,054 | 100.00% |
| Democratic hold | | | |

=== District 21 ===
Republican primary results
| Party | Candidate | Votes | % |
|---|---|---|---|
| Republican | Russell "Rusty" Bowers | 6,968 | 100.00% |
| Total votes | | 6,968 | 100.00% |

Libertarian Primary Results
| Party | Candidate | Votes | % |
|---|---|---|---|
| Libertarian | Scott Grainger | 16 | 100.00% |
| Total votes | | 16 | 100.00% |

General election results
| Party | Candidate | Votes | % |
|---|---|---|---|
| Republican | Russell "Rusty" Bowers | 33,323 | 75.13% |
| Libertarian | Scott Grainger | 11,032 | 24.87% |
| Total votes | | 44,355 | 100.00% |
| Republican hold | | | |

=== District 22 ===
Democratic primary results
| Party | Candidate | Votes | % |
|---|---|---|---|
| Democratic | Joe Eddie Lopez | 3,419 | 100.00% |
| Total votes | | 3,419 | 100.00% |

General election results
| Party | Candidate | Votes | % |
|---|---|---|---|
| Democratic | Joe Eddie Lopez | 12,934 | 100.00% |
| Total votes | | 12,934 | 100.00% |
| Democratic hold | | | |

=== District 23 ===
Democratic primary results
| Party | Candidate | Votes | % |
|---|---|---|---|
| Democratic | Sandra Kennedy (incumbent) | 2,938 | 56.02% |
| Democratic | Frances Castillo | 2,307 | 43.98% |
| Total votes | | 5,245 | 100.00% |

Republican primary results
| Party | Candidate | Votes | % |
|---|---|---|---|
| Republican | William "Wink" Wiess | 882 | 100.00% |
| Total votes | | 882 | 100.00% |

General election results
| Party | Candidate | Votes | % |
|---|---|---|---|
| Democratic | Sandra Kennedy (incumbent) | 13,591 | 79.44% |
| Republican | William "Wink" Wiess | 3,517 | 20.56% |
| Total votes | | 17,108 | 100.00% |
| Democratic hold | | | |

=== District 24 ===
Democratic primary results
| Party | Candidate | Votes | % |
|---|---|---|---|
| Democratic | Eric Ehst | 2,491 | 100.00% |
| Total votes | | 2,491 | 100.00% |

Republican primary results
| Party | Candidate | Votes | % |
|---|---|---|---|
| Republican | Sue Grace | 5,257 | 50.28% |
| Republican | Ted Mullen | 3,745 | 35.82% |
| Republican | Jack Hinchcliffe | 1,454 | 13.91% |
| Total votes | | 10,456 | 100.00% |

Libertarian Primary Results
| Party | Candidate | Votes | % |
|---|---|---|---|
| Libertarian | Gary Fallon | 55 | 100.00% |
| Total votes | | 55 | 100.00% |

General election results
| Party | Candidate | Votes | % |
|---|---|---|---|
| Republican | Sue Grace | 32,111 | 62.11% |
| Democratic | Eric Ehst | 15,659 | 30.29% |
| Libertarian | Gary Fallon | 3,931 | 7.60% |
| Total votes | | 51,701 | 100.00% |
| Republican hold | | | |

=== District 25 ===
Democratic primary results
| Party | Candidate | Votes | % |
|---|---|---|---|
| Democratic | Chris Cummiskey (incumbent) | 5,067 | 100.00% |
| Total votes | | 5,067 | 100.00% |

Republican primary results
| Party | Candidate | Votes | % |
|---|---|---|---|
| Republican | Steve May | 2,571 | 45.29% |
| Republican | Gene Reed | 2,103 | 37.04% |
| Republican | Joel K. Barr | 1,003 | 17.67% |
| Total votes | | 5,677 | 100.00% |

Libertarian Primary Results
| Party | Candidate | Votes | % |
|---|---|---|---|
| Libertarian | John Williams | 56 | 100.00% |
| Total votes | | 56 | 100.00% |

General election results
| Party | Candidate | Votes | % |
|---|---|---|---|
| Democratic | Chris Cummiskey (incumbent) | 21,543 | 58.34% |
| Republican | Steve May | 13,751 | 37.24% |
| Libertarian | John Williams | 1,631 | 4.42% |
| Total votes | | 36,925 | 100.00% |
| Democratic hold | | | |

=== District 26 ===
Democratic primary results
| Party | Candidate | Votes | % |
|---|---|---|---|
| Democratic | Bodo Diehn | 3,198 | 100.00% |
| Total votes | | 3,198 | 100.00% |

Republican primary results
| Party | Candidate | Votes | % |
|---|---|---|---|
| Republican | Tom Patterson (incumbent) | 8,381 | 100.00% |
| Total votes | | 8,381 | 100.00% |

General election results
| Party | Candidate | Votes | % |
|---|---|---|---|
| Republican | Tom Patterson (incumbent) | 32,081 | 64.35% |
| Democratic | Bodo Diehn | 17,775 | 35.65% |
| Total votes | | 49,856 | 100.00% |
| Republican hold | | | |

=== District 27 ===
Democratic primary results
| Party | Candidate | Votes | % |
|---|---|---|---|
| Democratic | Paul Valach | 4,520 | 100.00% |
| Total votes | | 4,520 | 100.00% |

Republican primary results
| Party | Candidate | Votes | % |
|---|---|---|---|
| Republican | Gary Richardson (incumbent) | 8,381 | 100.00% |
| Total votes | | 8,381 | 100.00% |

General election results
| Party | Candidate | Votes | % |
|---|---|---|---|
| Republican | Gary Richardson (incumbent) | 28,065 | 58.74% |
| Democratic | Paul Valach | 19,710 | 41.26% |
| Total votes | | 47,775 | 100.00% |
| Republican hold | | | |

=== District 28 ===
Republican primary results
| Party | Candidate | Votes | % |
|---|---|---|---|
| Republican | Randall Gnant (incumbent) | 9,965 | 67.46% |
| Republican | Norval O. Tyler | 4,806 | 32.54% |
| Total votes | | 14,771 | 100.00% |

General election results
| Party | Candidate | Votes | % |
|---|---|---|---|
| Republican | Randall Gnant (incumbent) | 58,671 | 100.00% |
| Total votes | | 58,671 | 100.00% |
| Republican hold | | | |

=== District 29 ===
Republican primary results
| Party | Candidate | Votes | % |
|---|---|---|---|
| Republican | David A. Petersen (incumbent) | 6,010 | 100.00% |
| Total votes | | 6,010 | 100.00% |

General election results
| Party | Candidate | Votes | % |
|---|---|---|---|
| Republican | David A. Petersen (incumbent) | 24,440 | 100.00% |
| Total votes | | 24,440 | 100.00% |
| Republican hold | | | |

=== District 30 ===
Democratic primary results
| Party | Candidate | Votes | % |
|---|---|---|---|
| Democratic | Paul Brando | 2,286 | 100.00% |
| Total votes | | 2,286 | 100.00% |

Republican primary results
| Party | Candidate | Votes | % |
|---|---|---|---|
| Republican | Tom Freestone | 10,255 | 100.00% |
| Total votes | | 10,255 | 100.00% |

General election results
| Party | Candidate | Votes | % |
|---|---|---|---|
| Republican | Tom Freestone | 40,622 | 69.34% |
| Democratic | Paul Brando | 17,963 | 30.66% |
| Total votes | | 58,585 | 100.00% |
| Republican hold | | | |
