= 41st Arizona State Legislature =

Session of the Arizona Legislature

| ← | 40th | 42nd | → |
- Arizona State Capitol (2014)

Overview
- Legislative body: Arizona State Legislature
- Jurisdiction: Arizona, United States
- Term: January 1, 1993 – December 31, 1994

Senate
- Members: 30
- President: John Greene
- Temporary President: Pat Wright
- Party control: Republican (18–12)

House of Representatives
- Members: 60
- Speaker: Mark Killian
- Party control: Republican (35–25)

Sessions
- 1st: January 11 – April 17, 1993
- 2nd: January 10 – April 17, 1994

Special sessions
- 1st: February 23 – March 4, 1993
- 2nd: March 11 – March 16, 1993
- 3rd: June 7 – June 11, 1993
- 4th: September 2 – September 2, 1993
- 5th: September 27 – September 28, 1993
- 6th: November 5 – November 11, 1993
- 7th: December 17 – December 17, 1993
- 8th: March 28 – March 30, 1994
- 9th: June 15 – June 17, 1994

The 41st Arizona State Legislature, consisting of the Arizona State Senate and the Arizona House of Representatives, was constituted in Phoenix from January 1, 1993, to December 31, 1994, during the second two years of Fife Symington's first term as governor. Both the Senate and the House membership remained constant at 30 and 60, respectively. The Republicans flipped control in the Senate, gaining five seats and creating a Republican majority at 18–12. The Republicans gained two seats in the house, increasing their majority to 35–25.

== Sessions ==
The Legislature met for two regular sessions at the State Capitol in Phoenix. The first opened on January 11, 1993, and adjourned on April 17, while the Second Regular Session convened on January 10, 1994, and adjourned sine die on April 17.

There were nine Special Sessions, the first of which was convened on February 23, 1993, and adjourned on March 4; the second convened on March 11, 1993, and adjourned sine die on March 16; the third convened on June 7, 1993, and adjourned sine die on June 11; the fourth convened on September 2, 1993, and adjourned sine die later that same day; the fifth convened on September 27, 1993, and adjourned sine die September 28; the sixth convened on November 5, 1993, and adjourned sine die on November 11; the seventh convened on December 17, 1993, and adjourned sine die later that same day; the eighth convened on March 28, 1994, and adjourned sine die on March 30; and the ninth and final special session convened on June 15, 1994, and adjourned sine die on June 17.

== State Senate ==
=== Members ===
The asterisk (*) denotes members of the previous Legislature who continued in office as members of this Legislature.

| District | Senator | Party | Notes |
|---|---|---|---|
| 1 | Carol Springer* | Republican | |
| 2 | John Wettaw | Republican | |
| 3 | James Henderson Jr.* | Democrat | |
| 4 | A. V. "Bill" Hardt* | Democrat | |
| 5 | Jim Buster* | Republican | |
| 6 | John Huppenthal | Republican | |
| 7 | Pete Rios* | Democrat | |
| 8 | Gus Arzberger* | Democrat | |
| 9 | Keith Bee | Republican | |
| 10 | Victor Soltero | Democrat | |
| 11 | Peter Goudinoff | Democrat | |
| 12 | Ann Day* | Republican | |
| 13 | Patricia Noland | Republican | |
| 14 | Cindy Resnick* | Democrat | |
| 15 | Warren Austin Turner | Republican | |
| 16 | Stan Furman* | Democrat | |
| 17 | Pat Wright* | Republican | |
| 18 | Marc Spitzer | Republican | |
| 19 | Jan Brewer* | Republican | |
| 20 | Lela Alston* | Democrat | |
| 21 | Matt Salmon* | Republican | |
| 22 | Manuel "Lito" Pena* | Democrat | |
| 23 | Sandra Kennedy | Democrat | |
| 24 | John Greene* | Republican | |
| 25 | Chuck Blanchard* | Democrat | |
| 26 | Tom Patterson* | Republican | |
| 27 | Bev Hermon | Republican | |
| 28 | Ed Phillips* | Republican | |
| 29 | Lester Pearce* | Republican | |
| 30 | Larry Chesley | Republican | |

== House of Representatives ==
=== Members ===
The asterisk (*) denotes members of the previous Legislature who continued in office as members of this Legislature.

| District | Representative | Party | Notes |
|---|---|---|---|
| 1 | Donald R. Aldridge* | Republican | |
| 1 | Sue Lynch | Republican | |
| 2 | Joe Hart | Republican | |
| 2 | John Verkamp | Republican | |
| 3 | Benjamin Hanley* | Democrat | |
| 3 | Jack Jackson Sr.* | Democrat | |
| 4 | Jack A. Brown* | Democrat | |
| 4 | E. C. "Polly" Rosenbaum* | Democrat | |
| 5 | Pat Conner | Republican | |
| 5 | Robert McLendon* | Democrat | |
| 6 | Lori Daniels | Republican | |
| 6 | Richard Kyle | Republican | |
| 7 | Robert Chastain | Democrat | |
| 7 | Harry R. Clark | Democrat | |
| 8 | Paul Newman | Democrat | |
| 8 | Ruben F. Ortega* | Democrat | |
| 9 | W. A. McGibbon | Republican | |
| 9 | Lou-Ann Preble | Republican | |
| 10 | Carmen Cajero* | Democrat | |
| 10 | Phillip Hubbard* | Democrat | |
| 11 | Jorge Luis Garcia | Democrat | |
| 11 | Elaine Richardson | Democrat | |
| 12 | Winifred Hershberger | Republican | |
| 12 | Dan Schottel | Republican | |
| 13 | George Cunningham | Democrat | |
| 13 | Andy Nichols | Democrat | |
| 14 | Herschella Horton* | Democrat | |
| 14 | Ruth Solomon* | Democrat | |
| 15 | Ned King | Republican | |
| 15 | Jerry Overton | Republican | |
| 16 | Becky Jordan | Republican | |
| 16 | John Kaites | Republican | |
| 17 | Brenda Burns* | Republican | |
| 17 | Robert Burns* | Republican | |
| 18 | Susan Gerard* | Republican | |
| 18 | Jane Dee Hull*† | Republican | |
| 18 | Barry Wong† | Republican | |
| 19 | John C. Keegan | Republican | |
| 19 | Nancy Wessel*†† | Republican | |
| 19 | David Eberhart†† | Republican | |
| 20 | Linda Beezley | Democrat | |
| 20 | Debbie McCune-Davis* | Democrat | |
| 21 | Russell Wesley "Rusty" Bowers | Republican | |
| 21 | Leslie Whiting Johnson* | Republican | |
| 22 | Art Hamilton* | Democrat | |
| 22 | Joe Eddie Lopez* | Democrat | |
| 23 | Linda Aguirre | Democrat | |
| 23 | David Armstead | Democrat | |
| 24 | J. Ernest Baird | Republican | |
| 24 | Sue Grace* | Republican | |
| 25 | Chris Cummiskey* | Democrat | |
| 25 | Catherine Eden | Democrat | |
| 26 | Greg Patterson* | Republican | |
| 26 | Tom Smith | Republican | |
| 27 | Bob Edens | Republican | |
| 27 | Gary Richardson | Republican | |
| 28 | Lisa Graham* | Republican | |
| 28 | David Schweikert* | Republican | |
| 29 | Pat Blake* | Republican | |
| 29 | Lela Steffey* | Republican | |
| 30 | Jeff Groscost | Republican | |
| 30 | Mark Killian* | Republican | |

† Hull resigned on October 4, 1993, and was replaced by Wong on October 14, 1993

†† Wessel resigned on April 12, 1993, and was replaced by Eberhart on April 20, 1993
