= 40th Arizona State Legislature =

Session of the Arizona Legislature

←	39th	41st	→
- Arizona State Capitol (2014)

Overview
- Legislative body: Arizona State Legislature
- Jurisdiction: Arizona, United States
- Term: January 1, 1991 – December 31, 1992

Senate
- Members: 30
- President: Peter Rios
- Temporary President: A. V. "Bill" Hardt
- Party control: Democrat (17–13)

House of Representatives
- Members: 60
- Speaker: {{{speaker}}}
- Party control: Republican (33–27)

Sessions
- 1st: January 14 – June 22, 1991
- 2nd: January 13 – July 1, 1992

Special sessions
- 1st: January 31 – February 2, 1991
- 2nd: September 17 – September 17, 1991
- 3rd: November 1 – November 7, 1991
- 4th: December 2 – December 16, 1991
- 5th: February 17 – February 22, 1992
- 6th: February 17 – May 17, 1992
- 7th: March 17 – March 31, 1992
- 8th: April 8 – June 27, 1992
- 9th: May 4 – July 1, 1992

The 40th Arizona State Legislature, consisting of the Arizona State Senate and the Arizona House of Representatives, was constituted in Phoenix from January 1, 1991, to December 31, 1992, during the first two years of Fife Symington's first term as governor. Both the Senate and the House membership remained constant at 30 and 60, respectively. The Democrats flipped control in the Senate, gaining four seats and creating a Democratic majority of 17–13. The Democrats also gained two seats in the house, decreasing the Republican majority to 33–27.

== Sessions ==
The Legislature met for two regular sessions at the State Capitol in Phoenix. The first opened on January 14, 1991, and adjourned on June 22, while the Second Regular Session convened on January 13, 1992, and adjourned sine die on July 1.

There were nine Special Sessions, the first of which was convened on January 31, 1991, and adjourned on February 2; the second convened on September 17, 1991, and adjourned sine die later that same day; the third convened on November 1, 1991, and adjourned sine die on November 7; the fourth convened on December 2, 1991, and adjourned sine die on December 16; and the fifth convened on February 17, 1992, and adjourned sine die February 22; the sixth convened on February 17, 1992, and adjourned sine die on May 7; the seventh convened on March 17, 1992, and adjourned sine die on March 31; the eighth convened on April 8, 1992, and adjourned sine die on June 27; and the ninth and final special session convened on May 4, 1992, and adjourned sine die on July 1.

== State Senate ==
=== Members ===
The asterisk (*) denotes members of the previous Legislature who continued in office as members of this Legislature.

District	Senator	Party	Notes
1	Carol Springer	Republican	
2	Karan English	Democrat	
3	James Henderson Jr.*	Democrat	
4	A. V. "Bill" Hardt*	Democrat	
5	Jim Buster	Republican	
6	Allen J. Stephens*	Democrat	
7	Peter D. Rios*	Democrat	
8	Gus Arzberger*	Democrat	
9	John E. Dougherty	Democrat	
10	Jesus Higuera*	Democrat	
11	Jaime P. Gutierrez*	Democrat	
12	Ann Day	Republican	
13	David C. Bartlett*	Democrat	
14	Cindy Resnick	Democrat	
15	Bob Denny*	Republican	
16	Stan Furman	Democrat	
17	Pat Wright*	Republican	
18	Nancy L. Hill	Democrat	
19	Janice Brewer*	Republican	
20	Lela Alston*	Democrat	
21	Matt Salmon	Republican	
22	Manuel "Lito" Pena*	Democrat	
23	Carolyn Walker*	Democrat	
24	John Greene	Republican	
25	Chuck Blanchard	Democrat	
26	Tom Patterson*	Republican	
27	Doug Todd*	Republican	
28	Ed Phillips	Republican	
29	Lester Pearce*	Republican	
30	James Sossaman*	Republican	

== House of Representatives ==
=== Members ===
The asterisk (*) denotes members of the previous Legislature who continued in office as members of this Legislature.

District	Representative	Party	Notes
1	Donald R. Aldridge*	Republican	
1	R. D. Carson*	Republican	
2	Ben Benton	Republican	
2	John Wettaw*	Republican	
3	Benjamin Hanley*	Democrat	
3	Jack C. Jackson*	Democrat	
4	Jack A. Brown*	Democrat	
4	E. C. "Polly" Rosenbaum*	Democrat	
5	Herbert Guenther*	Democrat	
5	Robert J. McLendon*	Democrat	
6	Henry Evans*	Democrat	
6	James Hartdegen*	Republican	
7	Frank Arthur Celaya*	Democrat	
7	Richard Pacheco*	Democrat	
8	Ruben F. Ortega*	Democrat	
8	Michael D. Palmer*	Democrat	
9	Keith Bee	Republican	
9	Marion L. Pickens	Democrat	
10	Carmen Cajero*	Democrat	
10	Phillip Hubbard*	Democrat	
11	Peter Goudinoff*	Democrat	
11	John Kromko*	Democrat	
12	Ruth E. Eskesen*	Republican	
12	Jack Jewett*	Republican	
13	Patricia Noland*	Republican	
13	Eleanor D. Schorr*	Democrat	
14	Herschella Horton	Democrat	
14	Ruth Solomon	Democrat	
15	Kyle W. Hindman*	Republican	
15	Robert W. Williams*	Republican	
16	Dave McCarroll*	Republican	
16	Karen Mills*	Republican	
17	Brenda Burns*	Republican	
17	Robert Burns*	Republican	
18	Susan Muir Gerard*	Republican	
18	Jane Dee Hull*	Republican	
19	Don Kenney*	Republican	
19	Nancy Wessel*	Republican	
20	Debbie McCune-Davis*	Democrat	
20	Bobby Raymond*	Democrat	
21	Stan Barnes*	Republican	
21	Leslie Whiting Johnson*	Republican	
22	Art Hamilton*	Democrat	
22	Joe Eddie Lopez	Democrat	
23	Sandra D. Kennedy*	Democrat	
23	Armando Ruiz*	Democrat	
24	Sue Grace	Republican	
24	Candice Nagel*	Republican	
25	Chris Cummiskey	Democrat	
25	Suzanne Laybe*	Democrat	
26	Jim Meredith*	Republican	
26	Greg Patterson	Republican	
27	Bev Hermon*	Republican	
27	Gary Richardson	Republican	
28	Lisa Graham	Republican	
28	David Schweikert	Republican	
29	Pat Blake	Republican	
29	Lela Steffey*	Republican	
30	Mark Killian*	Republican	
30	William A. Mundell*	Republican	
