= 1992 Arizona Senate election =

- November 3, 1992

All 30 seats of the Arizona Senate 16 seats needed for a majority
	Majority party	Minority party
Leader	John Greene	Cindy L. Resnick
Party	Republican	Democratic
Leader's seat	24th	14th
Seats before	13	17
Seats after	18	12
Seat change	▲5	▼5
- Results: Republican gain Republican hold Democratic hold
Senate President before election
Peter Rios
Democratic
Elected Senate President
John Greene
Republican

The 1992 Arizona Senate election was held on November 3, 1992. Voters elected members of the Arizona Senate in all 30 of the state's legislative districts to serve a two-year term. Primary elections were held on September 8, 1992.

Prior to the elections, the Democrats held a majority of 17 seats over the Republicans' 13 seats.

Following the election, Republicans flipped control of the chamber and took a majority of 18 Republicans to 12 Democrats, a net gain of five seats for Republicans.

The newly elected senators served in the 41st Arizona State Legislature.

== Retiring Incumbents ==
=== Democrats ===
1. District 2: Karan English
2. District 6: Alan J. Stephens
3. District 11: Jaime P. Gutierrez
4. District 13: David C. Bartlett
5. District 23: Armando Ruiz (Note: Senator Carolyn Walker was expelled from the Senate March 20, 1991; Armando Ruiz was appointed to fill the District 23 opening April 1, 1991.)

=== Republicans ===
1. District 15: Bob Denny
2. District 27: Doug Todd
3. District 30: James J. Sossaman

== Incumbents Defeated in General Elections ==
=== Democrats ===
1. District 9: John Dougherty
2. District 18: Nancy Hill

== Summary of Results by Arizona State Legislative District ==
District	Incumbent	Party	Elected Senator	Outcome
1st	Carol Springer	Rep	Carol Springer	Rep Hold
2nd	Karan English	Dem	John Wettaw	Rep Gain
3rd	James Henderson Jr.	Dem	James Henderson Jr.	Dem Hold
4th	A.V. "Bill" Hardt	Dem	A.V. "Bill" Hardt	Dem Hold
5th	Jim Buster	Rep	Jim Buster	Rep Hold
6th	Alan J. Stephens	Dem	John Huppenthal	Rep Gain
7th	Peter Rios	Dem	Peter Rios	Dem Hold
8th	Gus Arzberger	Dem	Gus Arzberger	Dem Hold
9th	John Dougherty	Dem	Keith A. Bee	Rep Gain
10th	Victor Soltero (Note: Senator Jesus "Chuy" Higuera resigned from the Senate March 20, 1991; Victor E. Soltero was appointed to fill the District 10 opening effective April 1, 1991.)	Dem	Victor Soltero	Dem Hold
11th	Jaime P. Gutierrez	Dem	Peter Goudinoff	Dem Hold
12th	Ann Day	Rep	Ann Day	Rep Hold
13th	David C. Bartlett	Dem	Patricia A. "Patti" Noland	Rep Gain
14th	Cindy L. Resnick	Dem	Cindy L. Resnick	Dem Hold
15th	Bob Denny	Rep	Austin Turner	Rep Hold
16th	Stan Furman	Dem	Stan Furman	Dem Hold
17th	Patricia "Pat" Wright	Rep	Patricia "Pat" Wright	Rep Hold
18th	Nancy Hill	Dem	Marc Spitzer	Rep Gain
19th	Jan Brewer	Rep	Jan Brewer	Rep Hold
20th	Lela Alston	Dem	Lela Alston	Dem Hold
21st	Matt Salmon	Rep	Matt Salmon	Rep Hold
22nd	Manuel "Lito" Peña	Dem	Manuel "Lito" Peña	Dem Hold
23rd	Armando Ruiz	Dem	Sandra Kennedy	Dem Hold
24th	John Greene	Rep	John Greene	Rep Hold
25th	Chuck Blanchard	Dem	Chuck Blanchard	Dem Hold
26th	Tom Patterson	Rep	Tom Patterson	Rep Hold
27th	Doug Todd	Rep	Bev Hermon	Rep Hold
28th	Ed Phillips	Rep	Ed Phillips	Rep Hold
29th	Lester N. Pearce	Rep	Lester N. Pearce	Rep Hold
30th	James J. Sossaman	Rep	Larry Chesley	Rep Hold

== Detailed Results ==
=== District 1 ===
Democratic primary results
Party	Candidate	Votes	%
Democratic	Anne McKinley	8,007	100.00%
Total votes		8,007	100.00%

Republican primary results
Party	Candidate	Votes	%
Republican	Carol Springer (incumbent)	8,728	47.92%
Republican	Jim Heath	5,441	29.88%
Republican	Kathleen M. Haley	4,043	22.20%
Total votes		18,212	100.00%

General election results
Party	Candidate	Votes	%
Republican	Carol Springer (incumbent)	34,289	56.76%
Democratic	Anne McKinley	26,124	43.24%
Total votes		60,413	100.00%
Republican hold			

=== District 2 ===
- Democratic Senator Karan English did not seek reelection and no other Democrat ran in the district; therefore, it was an automatic pick-up for the Republicans.

Republican primary results
Party	Candidate	Votes	%
Republican	John Wettaw	9,250	100.00%
Total votes		9,250	100.00%

Libertarian Primary Results
Party	Candidate	Votes	%
Libertarian	Michael Voth	48	100.00%
Total votes		48	100.00%

General election results
Party	Candidate	Votes	%
Republican	John Wettaw	40,647	76.83%
Libertarian	Michael Voth	12,261	23.17%
Total votes		52,908	100.00%
Republican gain from Democratic			

=== District 3 ===
Democratic primary results
Party	Candidate	Votes	%
Democratic	James Henderson Jr. (incumbent)	12,526	100.00%
Total votes		12,526	100.00%

General election results
Party	Candidate	Votes	%
Democratic	James Henderson Jr. (incumbent)	28,627	100.00%
Total votes		28,627	100.00%
Democratic hold			

=== District 4 ===
Democratic primary results
Party	Candidate	Votes	%
Democratic	A. V. "Bill" Hardt (incumbent)	17,087	100.00%
Total votes		17,087	100.00%

General election results
Party	Candidate	Votes	%
Democratic	A. V. "Bill" Hardt (incumbent)	33,193	100.00%
Total votes		33,193	100.00%
Democratic hold			

=== District 5 ===
Democratic primary results
Party	Candidate	Votes	%
Democratic	Thomas B. Daniel	7,077	100.00%
Total votes		7,077	100.00%

Republican primary results
Party	Candidate	Votes	%
Republican	Jim Buster (incumbent)	5,483	100.00%
Total votes		5,483	100.00%

General election results
Party	Candidate	Votes	%
Republican	Jim Buster (incumbent)	18,319	55.50%
Democratic	Thomas B. Daniel	14,690	44.50%
Total votes		33,009	100.00%
Republican hold			

=== District 6 ===
Democratic primary results
Party	Candidate	Votes	%
Democratic	Jaime A. Vasquez	3,988	100.00%
Total votes		3,988	100.00%

Republican primary results
Party	Candidate	Votes	%
Republican	John Huppenthal	5,487	50.93%
Republican	Donald H. Goldwater	2,857	26.52%
Republican	Jerry Brooks	2,430	22.55%
Total votes		10,774	100.00%

General election results
Party	Candidate	Votes	%
Republican	John Huppenthal	36,970	66.53%
Democratic	Jaime A. Vasquez	18,595	33.47%
Total votes		55,565	100.00%
Republican gain from Democratic			

=== District 7 ===
Democratic primary results
Party	Candidate	Votes	%
Democratic	Peter Rios (incumbent)	9,470	100.00%
Total votes		9,470	100.00%

Libertarian Primary Results
Party	Candidate	Votes	%
Libertarian	Richard R. Stewart (Note: Ran as a write-in candidate in the primary election.)	4	100.00%
Total votes		4	100.00%

General election results
Party	Candidate	Votes	%
Democratic	Peter Rios (incumbent)	22,272	75.97%
Libertarian	Richard R. Stewart	7,043	24.03%
Total votes		29,315	100.00%
Democratic hold			

=== District 8 ===
Democratic primary results
Party	Candidate	Votes	%
Democratic	Gus Arzberger (incumbent)	12,442	100.00%
Total votes		12,442	100.00%

General election results
Party	Candidate	Votes	%
Democratic	Gus Arzberger (incumbent)	27,228	100.00%
Total votes		27,228	100.00%
Democratic hold			

=== District 9 ===
Democratic primary results
Party	Candidate	Votes	%
Democratic	John Dougherty (incumbent)	7,467	100.00%
Total votes		7,467	100.00%

Republican primary results
Party	Candidate	Votes	%
Republican	Keith A. Bee	10,359	100.00%
Total votes		10,359	100.00%

General election results
Party	Candidate	Votes	%
Republican	Keith A. Bee	27,128	53.43%
Democratic	John Dougherty (incumbent)	23,645	46.57%
Total votes		50,773	100.00%
Republican gain from Democratic			

=== District 10 ===
Democratic primary results
Party	Candidate	Votes	%
Democratic	Victor Soltero (incumbent)	6,635	100.00%
Total votes		6,635	100.00%

Libertarian Primary Results
Party	Candidate	Votes	%
Libertarian	Arthur Kerschen	32	100.00%
Total votes		32	100.00%

General election results
Party	Candidate	Votes	%
Democratic	Victor Soltero (incumbent)	21,517	81.96%
Libertarian	Arthur Kerschen	4,736	18.04%
Total votes		26,253	100.00%
Democratic hold			

=== District 11 ===
Democratic primary results
Party	Candidate	Votes	%
Democratic	Peter Goudinoff	7,806	100.00%
Total votes		7,806	100.00%

Republican primary results
Party	Candidate	Votes	%
Republican	Frank O. Romero	219	100.00%
Total votes		219	100.00%

Libertarian Primary Results
Party	Candidate	Votes	%
Libertarian	Norma Poplin	18	100.00%
Total votes		18	100.00%

General election results
Party	Candidate	Votes	%
Democratic	Peter Goudinoff	18,772	56.79%
Republican	Frank O. Romero	11,283	34.13%
Libertarian	Norma Poplin	1,748	5.29%
Time for Change	Joe Bernick	1,254	3.79%
Total votes		33,057	100.00%
Democratic hold			

=== District 12 ===
Republican primary results
Party	Candidate	Votes	%
Republican	Ann Day (incumbent)	7,366	56.37%
Republican	Ted Schlinkert	3,426	26.22%
Republican	M. J. Mawhinney	2,276	17.42%
Total votes		13,068	100.00%

Libertarian Primary Results
Party	Candidate	Votes	%
Libertarian	Roberta McMillan	33	100.00%
Total votes		33	100.00%

General election results
Party	Candidate	Votes	%
Republican	Ann Day (incumbent)	42,802	82.00%
Libertarian	Roberta McMillan	9,397	18.00%
Total votes		52,199	100.00%
Republican hold			

=== District 13 ===
Democratic primary results
Party	Candidate	Votes	%
Democratic	Eleanor D. Schorr	9,114	100.00%
Total votes		9,114	100.00%

Republican primary results
Party	Candidate	Votes	%
Republican	Patricia A. "Patti" Noland	9,172	100.00%
Total votes		9,172	100.00%

Libertarian Primary Results
Party	Candidate	Votes	%
Libertarian	Rachel Aschmann	61	100.00%
Total votes		61	100.00%

General election results
Party	Candidate	Votes	%
Republican	Patricia A. "Patti" Noland	28,411	48.76%
Democratic	Eleanor D. Schorr	27,805	47.72%
Libertarian	Rachel Aschmann	2,054	3.52%
Total votes		58,270	100.00%
Republican gain from Democratic			

=== District 14 ===
Democratic primary results
Party	Candidate	Votes	%
Democratic	Cindy L. Resnick (incumbent)	7,616	100.00%
Total votes		7,616	100.00%

Republican primary results
Party	Candidate	Votes	%
Republican	Truly Nolen	296	100.00%
Total votes		296	100.00%

Libertarian Primary Results
Party	Candidate	Votes	%
Libertarian	Mark A. Voelker	49	100.00%
Total votes		49	100.00%

General election results
Party	Candidate	Votes	%
Democratic	Cindy L. Resnick (incumbent)	35,609	82.79%
Libertarian	Mark A. Voelker	7,402	17.21%
Total votes		43,011	100.00%
Democratic hold			

=== District 15 ===
Republican primary results
Party	Candidate	Votes	%
Republican	Austin Turner	6,602	56.91%
Republican	Kyle Hindman	4,999	43.09%
Total votes		11,601	100.00%

Green Primary Results
Party	Candidate	Votes	%
Green	Mike McNally	1	100.00%
Total votes		1	100.00%

General election results
Party	Candidate	Votes	%
Republican	Austin Turner	33,244	77.74%
Green	Mike McNally	9,519	22.26%
Total votes		42,763	100.00%
Republican hold			

=== District 16 ===
Democratic primary results
Party	Candidate	Votes	%
Democratic	Stan Furman (incumbent)	4,031	100.00%
Total votes		4,031	100.00%

Republican primary results
Party	Candidate	Votes	%
Republican	Bob Hill	3,441	41.98%
Republican	Maxine Thompson	2,669	32.56%
Republican	Frank Koopman	2,087	25.46%
Total votes		8,197	100.00%

General election results
Party	Candidate	Votes	%
Democratic	Stan Furman (incumbent)	24,385	53.77%
Republican	Bob Hill	20,969	46.23%
Total votes		45,354	100.00%
Democratic hold			

=== District 17 ===
Republican primary results
Party	Candidate	Votes	%
Republican	Patricia "Pat" Wright (incumbent)	8,898	100.00%
Total votes		8,898	100.00%

Libertarian Primary Results
Party	Candidate	Votes	%
Libertarian	Kathy L. Harrer	9	100.00%
Total votes		9	100.00%

General election results
Party	Candidate	Votes	%
Republican	Patricia "Pat" Wright (incumbent)	35,150	78.63%
Libertarian	Kathy L. Harrer	9,552	21.37%
Total votes		44,702	100.00%
Republican hold			

=== District 18 ===
Democratic primary results
Party	Candidate	Votes	%
Democratic	Nancy Hill (incumbent)	5,188	100.00%
Total votes		5,188	100.00%

Republican primary results
Party	Candidate	Votes	%
Republican	Marc Spitzer	5,968	57.70%
Republican	Chris Wertheim	4,376	42.30%
Total votes		10,344	100.00%

General election results
Party	Candidate	Votes	%
Republican	Marc Spitzer	25,462	49.64%
Democratic	Nancy Hill (incumbent)	23,293	45.41%
Declaration of Independents (Note: Designated party as "Declaration of Independents".)	Donna Hancock	2,541	4.95%
Total votes		51,296	100.00%
Republican gain from Democratic			

=== District 19 ===
Democratic primary results
Party	Candidate	Votes	%
Democratic	Marlene L. Abbott	3,703	100.00%
Total votes		3,703	100.00%

Republican primary results
Party	Candidate	Votes	%
Republican	Jan Brewer (incumbent)	7,220	100.00%
Total votes		7,220	100.00%

General election results
Party	Candidate	Votes	%
Republican	Jan Brewer (incumbent)	33,928	65.08%
Democratic	Marlene L. Abbott	18,203	34.92%
Total votes		52,131	100.00%
Republican hold			

=== District 20 ===
Democratic primary results
Party	Candidate	Votes	%
Democratic	Lela Alston (incumbent)	4,650	98.62%
Democratic	Mary Hartley	65	1.38%
Total votes		4,715	100.00%

Republican primary results
Party	Candidate	Votes	%
Republican	John Martin Keck	3,644	100.00%
Total votes		3,644	100.00%

General election results
Party	Candidate	Votes	%
Democratic	Lela Alston (incumbent)	19,313	61.41%
Republican	John Martin Keck	12,138	38.59%
Total votes		31,451	100.00%
Democratic hold			

=== District 21 ===
Republican primary results
Party	Candidate	Votes	%
Republican	Matt Salmon (incumbent)	8,390	100.00%
Total votes		8,390	100.00%

General election results
Party	Candidate	Votes	%
Republican	Matt Salmon (incumbent)	34,417	100.00%
Total votes		34,417	100.00%
Republican hold			

=== District 22 ===
Democratic primary results
Party	Candidate	Votes	%
Democratic	Manuel "Lito" Peña (incumbent)	3,668	100.00%
Total votes		3,668	100.00%

New Alliance Primary Results
Party	Candidate	Votes	%
New Alliance	Greg L. Campbell	7	100.00%
Total votes		7	100.00%

General election results
Party	Candidate	Votes	%
Democratic	Manuel "Lito" Peña (incumbent)	14,892	76.20%
New Alliance	Greg L. Campbell	4,651	23.80%
Total votes		19,543	100.00%
Democratic hold			

=== District 23 ===
Democratic primary results
Party	Candidate	Votes	%
Democratic	Sandra Kennedy	2,637	41.33%
Democratic	Richard Estrada	2,360	36.98%
Democratic	Tony R. Abril, Sr.	782	12.26%
Democratic	C. E. "Chuck" Hagley	602	9.43%
Total votes		6,381	100.00%

Libertarian Primary Results
Party	Candidate	Votes	%
Libertarian	Robert Howarth	26	100.00%
Total votes		26	100.00%

New Alliance Primary Results
Party	Candidate	Votes	%
New Alliance	Carolyn T. Lowery	3	100.00%
Total votes		3	100.00%

General election results
Party	Candidate	Votes	%
Democratic	Sandra Kennedy	16,976	83.24%
Libertarian	Robert Howarth	2,094	10.27%
New Alliance	Carolyn T. Lowery	1,324	6.49%
Independent	Bradley Cashman (Note: Ran as a write-in candidate in the general election.)	1	0.00%
Total votes		20,395	100.00%
Democratic hold			

=== District 24 ===
Republican primary results
Party	Candidate	Votes	%
Republican	John Greene (incumbent)	5,589	68.25%
Republican	Ted Humes	2,600	31.75%
Total votes		8,189	100.00%

Libertarian Primary Results
Party	Candidate	Votes	%
Libertarian	Marilyn Titschinger	58	100.00%
Total votes		58	100.00%

General election results
Party	Candidate	Votes	%
Republican	John Greene (incumbent)	31,306	64.48%
Independent	Tom Beauchamp	9,624	19.82%
Libertarian	Marilyn Titschinger	7,623	15.70%
Total votes		48,553	100.00%
Republican hold			

=== District 25 ===
Democratic primary results
Party	Candidate	Votes	%
Democratic	Chuck Blanchard (incumbent)	6,163	100.00%
Total votes		6,163	100.00%

Republican primary results
Party	Candidate	Votes	%
Republican	Roger Rudman	5,720	100.00%
Total votes		5,720	100.00%

General election results
Party	Candidate	Votes	%
Democratic	Chuck Blanchard (incumbent)	26,777	63.96%
Republican	Roger Rudman	15,091	36.04%
Total votes		41,868	100.00%
Democratic hold			

=== District 26 ===
Democratic primary results
Party	Candidate	Votes	%
Democratic	Paul C. Rodriguez	5,035	100.00%
Total votes		5,035	100.00%

Republican primary results
Party	Candidate	Votes	%
Republican	Tom Patterson (incumbent)	9,670	100.00%
Total votes		9,670	100.00%

General election results
Party	Candidate	Votes	%
Republican	Tom Patterson (incumbent)	33,183	61.28%
Democratic	Paul C. Rodriguez	20,964	38.72%
Total votes		54,147	100.00%
Republican hold			

=== District 27 ===
Republican primary results
Party	Candidate	Votes	%
Republican	Bev Hermon	8,256	100.00%
Total votes		8,256	100.00%

Libertarian Primary Results
Party	Candidate	Votes	%
Libertarian	Matt Gismondi	18	100.00%
Total votes		18	100.00%

General election results
Party	Candidate	Votes	%
Republican	Bev Hermon	41,623	81.50%
Libertarian	Matt Gismondi	9,451	18.50%
Total votes		51,074	100.00%
Republican hold			

=== District 28 ===
Republican primary results
Party	Candidate	Votes	%
Republican	Ed Phillips (incumbent)	10,756	100.00%
Total votes		10,756	100.00%

Libertarian Primary Results
Party	Candidate	Votes	%
Libertarian	Gary Sprunk	8	100.00%
Total votes		8	100.00%

General election results
Party	Candidate	Votes	%
Republican	Ed Phillips (incumbent)	54,769	88.07%
Libertarian	Gary Sprunk	7,419	11.93%
Total votes		62,188	100.00%
Republican hold			

=== District 29 ===
Democratic primary results
Party	Candidate	Votes	%
Democratic	Virginia Claseman	3,100	100.00%
Total votes		3,100	100.00%

Republican primary results
Party	Candidate	Votes	%
Republican	Lester N. Pearce (incumbent)	7,562	100.00%
Total votes		7,562	100.00%

General election results
Party	Candidate	Votes	%
Republican	Lester N. Pearce (incumbent)	21,753	57.16%
Democratic	Virginia Claseman	16,305	42.84%
Total votes		38,058	100.00%
Republican hold			

=== District 30 ===
Democratic primary results
Party	Candidate	Votes	%
Democratic	Christopher J. Wagner	3,526	100.00%
Total votes		3,526	100.00%

Republican primary results
Party	Candidate	Votes	%
Republican	Larry Chesley	5,885	48.58%
Republican	Andy Ostrander	3,306	27.29%
Republican	John M. Fillmore	2,922	24.12%
Total votes		12,113	100.00%

General election results
Party	Candidate	Votes	%
Republican	Larry Chesley	31,892	64.74%
Democratic	Christopher J. Wagner	17,369	35.26%
Total votes		49,261	100.00%
Republican hold			
