= 39th Arizona State Legislature =

Session of the Arizona Legislature

←	38th	40th	→
- Arizona State Capitol (2014)

Overview
- Legislative body: Arizona State Legislature
- Jurisdiction: Arizona, United States
- Term: January 1, 1989 – December 31, 1990

Senate
- Members: 30
- Party control: Republican (17–13)

House of Representatives
- Members: 60
- Party control: Republican (35–25)

Sessions
- 1st: January 9 – June 16, 1989
- 2nd: January 8 – June 28, 1990

Special sessions
- 1st: September 20 – September 22, 1989
- 2nd: November 21 – November 22, 1989
- 3rd: January 10 – June 28, 1990
- 4th: May 14 – May 16, 1990
- 5th: November 19 – November 19, 1990

The 39th Arizona State Legislature, consisting of the Arizona State Senate and the Arizona House of Representatives, was constituted in Phoenix from January 1, 1989, to December 31, 1990, during the last two years of Rose Mofford's term as governor. Both the Senate and the House membership remained constant at 30 and 60, respectively. The Democrats gained two seats in the Senate, cutting the Republican majority to 17–13, and the Democrats also gained a seat in the house, decreasing the Republican majority to 35–25.

== Sessions ==
The Legislature met for two regular sessions at the State Capitol in Phoenix. The first opened on January 9, 1989, and adjourned on June 16, while the Second Regular Session convened on January 8, 1990, and adjourned sine die on June 28.

There were five Special Sessions, the first of which was convened on September 20, 1989, and adjourned on September 22; the second convened on November 21, 1989, and adjourned sine die on November 22; the third convened on January 10, 1990, and adjourned sine die on June 28; the fourth convened on May 14, 1990, and adjourned sine die on May 16; and the fifth convened on November 19, 1990, and adjourned sine die later on that same day.

== State Senate ==
=== Members ===
The asterisk (*) denotes members of the previous Legislature who continued in office as members of this Legislature.

District	Senator	Party	Notes
1	John U. Hays*	Republican	
2	Tony Gabaldon*	Democrat	
3	James Henderson Jr.*	Democrat	
4	A. V. "Bill" Hardt*	Democrat	
5	Jones Osborn*	Democrat	
6	Allen J. Stephens*	Democrat	
7	Peter D. Rios*	Democrat	
8	Gus Arzberger	Democrat	
9	Jeffrey J. Hill*	Republican	
10	Jesus Higuera*	Democrat	
11	Jaime P. Gutierrez*	Democrat	
12	John T. Mawhinney*	Republican	
13	David C. Bartlett	Democrat	
14	William J. De Long *	Republican	
15	Bob Denny	Republican	
16	Wayne Stump*	Republican	
17	Pat Wright*	Republican	
18	Leo Corbet	Republican	
19	Janice Brewer*	Republican	
20	Lela Alston*	Democrat	
21	Jerry Gillespie	Republican	
22	Manuel "Lito" Pena*	Democrat	
23	Carolyn Walker*	Democrat	
24	Pete Corpstein*	Republican	
25	Jacque Steiner*	Republican	
26	Tom Patterson	Republican	
27	Doug Todd*	Republican	
28	Robert B. Usdane*	Republican	
29	Lester Pearce	Republican	
30	James Sossaman*	Republican	

== House of Representatives ==
=== Members ===
The asterisk (*) denotes members of the previous Legislature who continued in office as members of this Legislature.

District	Representative	Party	Notes
1	Donald R. Aldridge*	Republican	
1	R. D. Carson*	Republican	
2	Karan English*	Democrat	
2	John Wettaw*	Republican	
3	Benjamin Hanley*	Democrat	
3	Jack C. Jackson*	Democrat	
4	Jack A. Brown*	Democrat	
4	E. C. "Polly" Rosenbaum*	Democrat	
5	Herbert Guenther*	Democrat	
5	Robert J. McLendon*	Democrat	
6	Henry Evans*	Democrat	
6	James Hartdegen*	Republican	
7	Frank Arthur Celaya	Democrat	
7	Richard Pacheco*	Democrat	
8	Ruben F. Ortega	Democrat	
8	Michael D. Palmer	Democrat	
9	Bart Baker*	Republican	
9	William J. English*	Republican	
10	Carmen Cajero*	Democrat	
10	Phillip Hubbard*	Democrat	
11	Peter Goudinoff*	Democrat	
11	John Kromko*	Democrat	
12	Ruth E. Eskesen	Republican	
12	Jack Jewett*	Republican	
13	Patricia Noland	Republican	
13	Eleanor D. Schorr*	Democrat	
14	Cindy L. Resnick*	Democrat	
14	Ruth Solomon	Democrat	
15	Kyle W. Hindman	Republican	
15	Robert W. Williams	Republican	
16	Dave McCarroll	Republican	
16	Karen Mills	Republican	
17	Brenda Burns	Republican	
17	Robert Burns	Republican	
18	Susan Muir Gerard	Republican	
18	Jane Dee Hull*	Republican	
19	Don Kenney	Republican	
19	Nancy Wessel*	Republican	
20	Debbie McCune*	Democrat	
20	Bobby Raymond*	Democrat	
21	Stan Barnes	Republican	
21	Leslie Whiting Johnson*	Republican	
22	Art Hamilton*	Democrat	
22	Earl V. Wilcox*	Democrat	
23	Sandra D. Kennedy*	Democrat	
23	Armando Ruiz*	Democrat	
24	Chris Herstam*	Republican	
24	Candice Nagel	Republican	
25	Suzanne Laybe	Democrat	
25	Margaret Updike	Republican	
26	Jim Meredith*	Republican	
26	Jim Miller*	Republican	
27	Bev Hermon*	Republican	
27	Jenny Norton*	Republican	
28	Heinz Hink*	Republican	
28	Jim Skelly*	Republican	
29	Lela Steffey*	Republican	
29	John T. Wrzesinski	Republican	
30	Mark Killian*	Republican	
30	William A. Mundell*	Republican	
