= 1990 Arizona House of Representatives election =

1990 Arizona House of Representatives elections
- November 6, 1990

All 60 seats in the Arizona House 31 seats needed for a majority
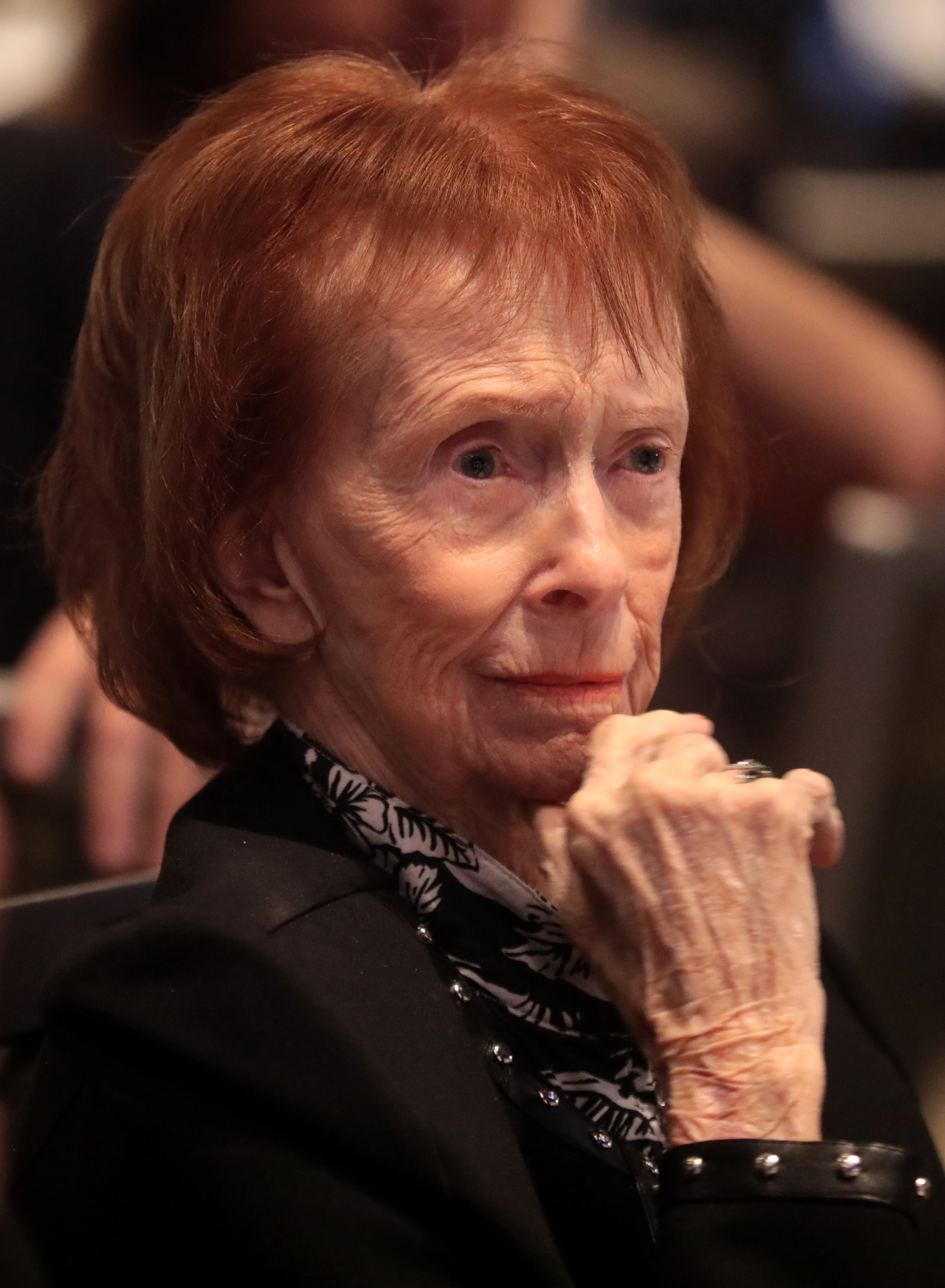

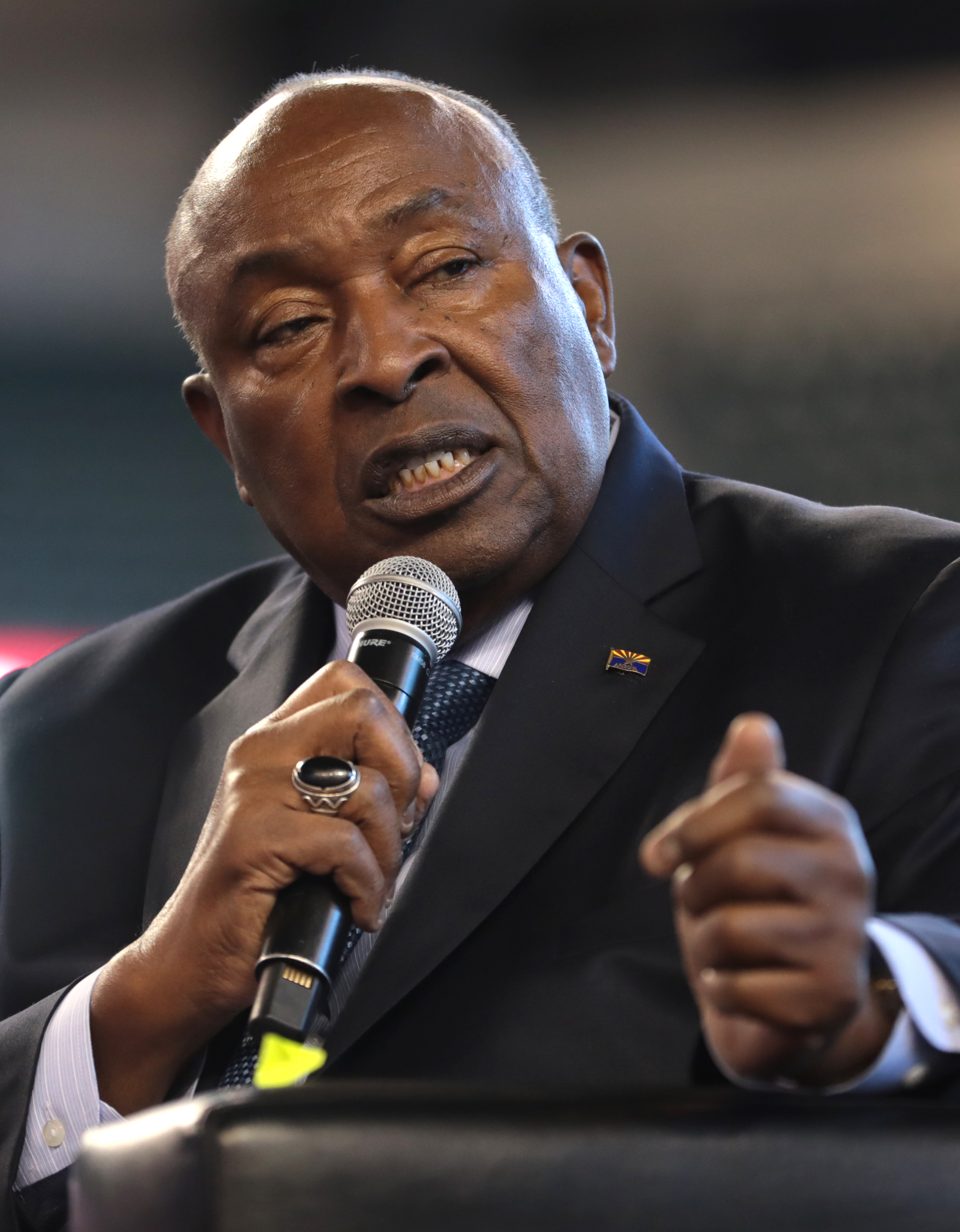
	Majority party	Minority party
Leader	Jane Dee Hull	Art Hamilton
Party	Republican	Democratic
Leader's seat	18th	22nd
Last election	34	26
Seats after	33	27
Seat change	▼1	▲1
Speaker before election
Jane Dee Hull
Republican
Elected Speaker
Jane Dee Hull
Republican

The 1990 Arizona House of Representatives elections were held on November 6, 1990. Voters elected all 60 members of the Arizona House of Representatives in multi-member districts to serve a two-year term. The elections coincided with the elections for other offices, including Governor, U.S. House, and State Senate. Primary elections were held on September 11, 1990.

Prior to the elections, the Republicans held a majority of 34 seats over the Democrats' 26 seats.

Following the elections, Republicans maintained control of the chamber, though their majority was reduced to 33 Republicans to 27 Democrats, a net gain of one seat for Democrats.

The newly elected members served in the 40th Arizona State Legislature, during which Republican Jane Dee Hull was re-elected as Speaker of the Arizona House. (Note: Hull was re-elected as Speaker for the 40th legislature, defeating Democratic Leader Representative Art Hamilton, who was also nominated for Speaker. The vote tally for Speaker was: Hull-33 votes to Hamilton-26 votes. Please note that the total number of votes for Speaker in 1991 sums to only 59 due to a vacancy in District 22.)

== Retiring Incumbents ==
=== Democrats ===
1. District 2: Karan English (Note: Elected to the Arizona State Senate.)
2. District 14: Cindy L. Resnick (Note: Elected to the Arizona State Senate.)

=== Republicans ===
1. District 24: Chris Herstam
2. District 27: Jenny Norton
3. District 28: Jim Skelly
4. District 28: Heinz R. Hink
5. District 29: John T. Wrzesinski (Note: Ran for Arizona's 1st congressional district in the 1990 U.S. House elections, but lost in the Republican primary to incumbent John Jacob Rhodes III.)

== Incumbents Defeated in Primary Elections ==
=== Republicans ===
1. District 9: Bart Baker
2. District 26: Jim Miller

== Incumbents Defeated in General Elections ==
=== Republicans ===
1. District 9: Bill English
2. District 25: Margaret Updike

== Summary of Results by Arizona State Legislative District ==
District	Incumbent	Party	Elected Representative	Outcome
1st	Don Aldridge	Rep	Don Aldridge	Rep Hold
1st	Dave Carson	Rep	Dave Carson	Rep Hold
2nd	John Wettaw	Rep	John Wettaw	Rep Hold
2nd	Karan English	Dem	Ben Benton	Rep Gain
3rd	Benjamin Hanley	Dem	Benjamin Hanley	Dem Hold
3rd	Jack C. Jackson	Dem	Jack C. Jackson	Dem Hold
4th	E. C. "Polly" Rosenbaum	Dem	E. C. "Polly" Rosenbaum	Dem Hold
4th	Jack A. Brown	Dem	Jack A. Brown	Dem Hold
5th	Robert J. "Bob" McLendon	Dem	Robert J. "Bob" McLendon	Dem Hold
5th	Herb Guenther	Dem	Herb Guenther	Dem Hold
6th	Jim Hartdegen	Rep	Jim Hartdegen (Note: Republican Roger D. Hooper was sworn in 3/19/1991 to replace Jim Hartdegen who resigned 3/12/1991.)	Rep Hold
6th	Henry Evans	Dem	Henry Evans	Dem Hold
7th	Richard "Dick" Pacheco	Dem	Richard "Dick" Pacheco	Dem Hold
7th	Frank "Art" Celaya	Dem	Frank "Art" Celaya	Dem Hold
8th	Ruben F. Ortega	Dem	Ruben F. Ortega	Dem Hold
8th	Mike Palmer	Dem	Mike Palmer	Dem Hold
9th	Bill English	Rep	Keith A. Bee	Rep Hold
9th	Bart Baker	Rep	Marion L. Pickens	Dem Gain
10th	Carmen Cajero	Dem	Carmen Cajero	Dem Hold
10th	Phillip Hubbard	Dem	Phillip Hubbard	Dem Hold
11th	Peter Goudinoff	Dem	Peter Goudinoff	Dem Hold
11th	John Kromko	Dem	John Kromko	Dem Hold
12th	Jack B. Jewett	Rep	Jack B. Jewett	Rep Hold
12th	Ruth E. Eskesen	Rep	Ruth E. Eskesen	Rep Hold
13th	Patricia A. "Patti" Noland	Rep	Patricia A. "Patti" Noland	Rep Hold
13th	Eleanor D. Schorr	Dem	Eleanor D. Schorr	Dem Hold
14th	Ruth Solomon	Dem	Ruth Solomon	Dem Hold
14th	Cindy L. Resnick	Dem	Herschella Horton	Dem Hold
15th	Kyle W. Hindman	Rep	Kyle W. Hindman	Rep Hold
15th	Bob Williams	Rep	Bob Williams	Rep Hold
16th	Karen Mills	Rep	Karen Mills	Rep Hold
16th	Dave McCarroll	Rep	Dave McCarroll	Rep Hold
17th	Brenda Burns	Rep	Brenda Burns	Rep Hold
17th	Robert "Bob" Burns	Rep	Robert "Bob" Burns	Rep Hold
18th	Jane Dee Hull	Rep	Jane Dee Hull	Rep Hold
18th	Susan Gerard	Rep	Susan Gerard	Rep Hold
19th	Nancy Wessel	Rep	Nancy Wessel	Rep Hold
19th	Don Kenney	Rep	Don Kenney (Note: Republican John C. Keegan was sworn in 3/12/1991 to replace Don Kenney who resigned 2/28/1991.)	Rep Hold
20th	Debbie McCune-Davis	Dem	Debbie McCune-Davis	Dem Hold
20th	Bobby Raymond	Dem	Bobby Raymond (Note: Democrat Linda D. Beezley was sworn in 3/4/1991 to replace Bobby Raymond who resigned 2/19/1991.)	Dem Hold
21st	Leslie Whiting Johnson	Rep	Leslie Whiting Johnson	Rep Hold
21st	Stan Barnes	Rep	Stan Barnes	Rep Hold
22nd	Art Hamilton	Dem	Art Hamilton	Dem Hold
22nd	Earl V. Wilcox	Dem	Earl V. Wilcox (Note: Democrat Joe Eddie Lopez was sworn in 1/24/1991 to replace Earl V. Wilcox who never took the oath of office for this seat, causing a vacancy.)	Dem Hold
23rd	Armando Ruiz	Dem	Armando Ruiz (Note: Democrat George B. "G. Benjamin" Brooks was sworn in 4/2/1991 to replace Armando Ruiz who resigned 4/1/1991.)	Dem Hold
23rd	Sandra Kennedy	Dem	Sandra Kennedy	Dem Hold
24th	Candice Nagel	Rep	Candice Nagel (Note: Republican J. Ernest Baird was sworn in 3/14/1991 to replace Candice Nagel who resigned 3/7/1991.)	Rep Hold
24th	Chris Herstam	Rep	Sue Grace	Rep Hold
25th	Sue Laybe	Dem	Sue Laybe (Note: Democrat Catherine R. Eden was sworn in 3/26/1991 to replace Sue Laybe who resigned 3/13/1991.)	Dem Hold
25th	Margaret Updike	Rep	Chris Cummiskey	Dem Gain
26th	Jim Meredith	Rep	Jim Meredith (Note: Republican Tom C. Smith was sworn in 3/25/1991 to replace Jim Meredith who resigned 3/12/1991.)	Rep Hold
26th	Jim Miller	Rep	Greg Patterson	Rep Hold
27th	Bev Hermon	Rep	Bev Hermon	Rep Hold
27th	Jenny Norton	Rep	Gary Richardson	Rep Hold
28th	Jim Skelly	Rep	David Schweikert	Rep Hold
28th	Heinz R. Hink	Rep	Lisa Graham	Rep Hold
29th	Lela Steffey	Rep	Lela Steffey	Rep Hold
29th	John T. Wrzesinski	Rep	Pat Blake	Rep Hold
30th	Mark W. Killian	Rep	Mark W. Killian	Rep Hold
30th	William "Bill" A. Mundell	Rep	William "Bill" A. Mundell	Rep Hold

== Detailed Results ==
=== District 1 ===
Primary Election Results
Party	Candidate	Votes	%
Democratic Party Primary Results
Democratic	Keith R. Seaman	8,187	100.00%
Total votes		8,187	100.00%
Republican Party Primary Results
Republican	Don Aldridge (incumbent)	14,220	50.78%
Republican	Dave Carson (incumbent)	13,783	49.22%
Total votes		28,003	100.00%

General Election Results
Party	Candidate	Votes	%
Republican	Don Aldridge (incumbent)	27,903	35.84%
Republican	Dave Carson (incumbent)	27,608	35.46%
Democratic	Keith R. Seaman	22,354	28.71%
Total votes		77,865	100.00%
Republican hold			
Republican hold			

=== District 2 ===
Primary Election Results
Party	Candidate	Votes	%
Democratic Party Primary Results
Democratic	John R. Parsons	5,432	52.77%
Democratic	Wally Quayle	4,862	47.23%
Total votes		10,294	100.00%
Republican Party Primary Results
Republican	John Wettaw (incumbent)	9,269	57.76%
Republican	Ben Benton	6,778	42.24%
Total votes		16,047	100.00%

General Election Results
Party	Candidate	Votes	%
Republican	John Wettaw (incumbent)	25,053	32.42%
Republican	Ben Benton	17,650	22.84%
Democratic	Wally Quayle	15,634	20.23%
Democratic	John R. Parsons	14,654	18.96%
Independent	Steven Saunders	4,285	5.55%
Total votes		77,276	100.00%
Republican hold			
Republican gain from Democratic			

=== District 3 ===
Primary Election Results
Party	Candidate	Votes	%
Democratic Party Primary Results
Democratic	Jack C. Jackson (incumbent)	5,152	56.65%
Democratic	Benjamin Hanley (incumbent)	3,942	43.35%
Total votes		9,094	100.00%
Republican Party Primary Results
Republican	Daniel Peaches	1,792	100.00%
Total votes		1,792	100.00%

General Election Results
Party	Candidate	Votes	%
Democratic	Jack C. Jackson (incumbent)	13,417	42.49%
Democratic	Benjamin Hanley (incumbent)	12,233	38.74%
Republican	Daniel Peaches	5,929	18.78%
Total votes		31,579	100.00%
Democratic hold			
Democratic hold			

=== District 4 ===
Primary Election Results
Party	Candidate	Votes	%
Democratic Party Primary Results
Democratic	E.C. "Polly" Rosenbaum (incumbent)	9,098	52.99%
Democratic	Jack A. Brown (incumbent)	8,071	47.01%
Total votes		17,169	100.00%
Republican Party Primary Results
Republican	Chuck Rosa III	4,846	100.00%
Total votes		4,846	100.00%

General Election Results
Party	Candidate	Votes	%
Democratic	Jack A. Brown (incumbent)	16,843	38.80%
Democratic	E.C. "Polly" Rosenbaum (incumbent)	15,180	34.97%
Republican	Chuck Rosa III	11,385	26.23%
Total votes		43,408	100.00%
Democratic hold			
Democratic hold			

=== District 5 ===
Primary Election Results
Party	Candidate	Votes	%
Democratic Party Primary Results
Democratic	Robert J. "Bob" McLendon (incumbent)	4,646	53.69%
Democratic	Herb Guenther (incumbent)	4,008	46.31%
Total votes		8,654	100.00%
Republican Party Primary Results
Republican	Phil Wright	3,477	60.63%
Republican	La Roy F. Smith, Sr.	2,258	39.37%
Total votes		5,735	100.00%

General Election Results
Party	Candidate	Votes	%
Democratic	Robert J. "Bob" McLendon (incumbent)	12,395	31.32%
Democratic	Herb Guenther (incumbent)	11,885	30.03%
Republican	Phil Wright	8,996	22.73%
Republican	La Roy F. Smith, Sr.	6,305	15.93%
Total votes		39,581	100.00%
Democratic hold			
Democratic hold			

=== District 6 ===
Primary Election Results
Party	Candidate	Votes	%
Democratic Party Primary Results
Democratic	Henry Evans (incumbent)	5,670	51.67%
Democratic	Jim McCarthy	5,303	48.33%
Total votes		10,973	100.00%
Republican Party Primary Results
Republican	Jim Hartdegen (incumbent)	7,161	96.86%
Republican	Mike Murphy (Note: Was a write-in candidate in the primary election.)	232	3.14%
Total votes		7,393	100.00%

General Election Results
Party	Candidate	Votes	%
Republican	Jim Hartdegen (incumbent)	16,121	34.21%
Democratic	Henry Evans (incumbent)	15,531	32.96%
Democratic	Jim McCarthy	15,475	32.84%
Total votes		47,127	100.00%
Republican hold			
Democratic hold			

=== District 7 ===
Primary Election Results
Party	Candidate	Votes	%
Democratic Party Primary Results
Democratic	Frank "Art" Celaya (incumbent)	7,797	50.50%
Democratic	Richard "Dick" Pacheco (incumbent)	7,644	49.50%
Total votes		15,441	100.00%
Republican Party Primary Results
Republican	Charles "Chuck" Rushing (Note: It is not documented in the 1990 official canvass why Rushing did not appear on the general election ballot.)	3,703	53.46%
Republican	Fritz Frey	3,224	46.54%
Total votes		6,927	100.00%

General Election Results
Party	Candidate	Votes	%
Democratic	Frank "Art" Celaya (incumbent)	15,696	37.45%
Democratic	Richard "Dick" Pacheco (incumbent)	14,687	35.05%
Republican	Fritz Frey	11,519	27.49%
Independent	Edward J.B. Keeylocko (Note: Was a write-in candidate in the general election.) (Note: NPD - No Party Designated)	5	0.01%
Total votes		41,907	100.00%
Democratic hold			
Democratic hold			

=== District 8 ===
Primary Election Results
Party	Candidate	Votes	%
Democratic Party Primary Results
Democratic	Mike Palmer (incumbent)	7,584	50.15%
Democratic	Ruben F. Ortega (incumbent)	7,538	49.85%
Total votes		15,122	100.00%
Republican Party Primary Results
Republican	Bernard E. Christensen	4,358	100.00%
Total votes		4,358	100.00%

General Election Results
Party	Candidate	Votes	%
Democratic	Mike Palmer (incumbent)	13,400	37.00%
Democratic	Ruben F. Ortega (incumbent)	12,797	35.33%
Republican	Bernard E. Christensen	10,020	27.67%
Total votes		36,217	100.00%
Democratic hold			
Democratic hold			

=== District 9 ===
Primary Election Results
Party	Candidate	Votes	%
Democratic Party Primary Results
Democratic	Marion L. Pickens	7,909	100.00%
Total votes		7,909	100.00%
Republican Party Primary Results
Republican	Keith A. Bee	7,420	36.47%
Republican	Bill English (incumbent)	7,345	36.10%
Republican	Bart Baker (incumbent)	5,581	27.43%
Total votes		20,346	100.00%

General Election Results
Party	Candidate	Votes	%
Republican	Keith A. Bee	21,922	36.07%
Democratic	Marion L. Pickens	19,848	32.66%
Republican	Bill English (incumbent)	19,001	31.26%
Republican	Warren E. Faidley	5	0.01%
Total votes		60,776	100.00%
Republican hold			
Democratic gain from Republican			

=== District 10 ===
Primary Election Results
Party	Candidate	Votes	%
Democratic Party Primary Results
Democratic	Carmen Cajero (incumbent)	4,069	55.41%
Democratic	Phillip Hubbard (incumbent)	3,274	44.59%
Total votes		7,343	100.00%

General Election Results
Party	Candidate	Votes	%
Democratic	Carmen Cajero (incumbent)	10,638	40.73%
Democratic	Phillip Hubbard (incumbent)	9,252	35.42%
MLK - Martin Luther King	Lorenzo Torrez	2,476	9.48%
LR - Liberty Republican	Richard Brown	2,178	8.34%
FML - Free Market Libertarian	Jeannette Rose Allen	1,568	6.00%
NPD - No Party Designated	Tony Scopellite	9	0.03%
Total votes		26,121	100.00%
Democratic hold			
Democratic hold			

=== District 11 ===
Primary Election Results
Party	Candidate	Votes	%
Democratic Party Primary Results
Democratic	John Kromko (incumbent)	6,394	42.98%
Democratic	Peter Goudinoff (incumbent)	6,249	42.01%
Democratic	Charles S. Slade	2,233	15.01%
Total votes		14,876	100.00%
Republican Party Primary Results
Republican	Mike Price	3,829	100.00%
Total votes		3,829	100.00%

General Election Results
Party	Candidate	Votes	%
Democratic	Peter Goudinoff (incumbent)	16,295	38.94%
Democratic	John Kromko (incumbent)	15,883	37.95%
Republican	Mike Price	9,655	23.07%
Democratic	Dennis H. Williams	9	0.02%
NPD - No Party Designated	Jennie Musci	8	0.02%
Total votes		41,850	100.00%
Democratic hold			
Democratic hold			

=== District 12 ===
Primary Election Results
Party	Candidate	Votes	%
Democratic Party Primary Results
Democratic	Evan J. Adelstein	6,041	54.35%
Democratic	Phil Pierce	5,073	45.65%
Total votes		11,114	100.00%
Republican Party Primary Results
Republican	Jack B. Jewett (incumbent)	7,123	32.82%
Republican	Ruth E. Eskesen (incumbent)	6,642	30.61%
Republican	D. H. "Dan" Schottel, Sr.	4,456	20.53%
Republican	Les Whalon	3,481	16.04%
Total votes		21,702	100.00%

General Election Results
Party	Candidate	Votes	%
Republican	Ruth E. Eskesen (incumbent)	23,410	28.94%
Republican	Jack B. Jewett (incumbent)	23,353	28.87%
Democratic	Evan J. Adelstein	18,709	23.12%
Democratic	Phil Pierce	15,428	19.07%
NPD - No Party Designated	Robert W. Byrd	4	0.00%
Total votes		80,904	100.00%
Republican hold			
Republican hold			

=== District 13 ===
Primary Election Results
Party	Candidate	Votes	%
Democratic Party Primary Results
Democratic	Eleanor D. Schorr (incumbent)	7,811	66.62%
Democratic	Mark O'Hare	3,913	33.38%
Total votes		11,724	100.00%
Republican Party Primary Results
Republican	Patricia A. "Patti" Noland (incumbent)	8,345	46.47%
Republican	Tony Terry	5,732	31.92%
Republican	Roy E. Spears	3,880	21.61%
Total votes		17,957	100.00%

General Election Results
Party	Candidate	Votes	%
Republican	Patricia A. "Patti" Noland (incumbent)	24,703	32.43%
Democratic	Eleanor D. Schorr (incumbent)	21,553	28.29%
Republican	Tony Terry	16,970	22.28%
Democratic	Mark O'Hare	12,948	17.00%
Total votes		76,174	100.00%
Republican hold			
Democratic hold			

=== District 14 ===
Primary Election Results
Party	Candidate	Votes	%
Democratic Party Primary Results
Democratic	Ruth Solomon (incumbent)	7,052	70.95%
Democratic	Herschella Horton	2,887	29.05%
Total votes		9,939	100.00%
Republican Party Primary Results
Republican	Michael B. "Mike" Gilbert	5,779	33.17%
Republican	Edmund D. "Ed" Kahn	4,934	28.32%
Republican	Ken Chiaro	3,743	21.49%
Republican	Victor "Vic" Venne	2,965	17.02%
Total votes		17,421	100.00%

General Election Results
Party	Candidate	Votes	%
Democratic	Ruth Solomon (incumbent)	20,015	31.42%
Democratic	Herschella Horton	15,876	24.92%
Republican	Edmund D. "Ed" Kahn	14,308	22.46%
Republican	Michael B. "Mike" Gilbert	13,499	21.19%
Total votes		63,698	100.00%
Democratic hold			
Democratic hold			

=== District 15 ===
Primary Election Results
Party	Candidate	Votes	%
Democratic Party Primary Results
Democratic	R. Wes Stephens	5,930	100.00%
Total votes		5,930	100.00%
Republican Party Primary Results
Republican	Bob Williams (incumbent)	11,222	52.13%
Republican	Kyle W. Hindman (incumbent)	10,303	47.87%
Total votes		21,525	100.00%

General Election Results
Party	Candidate	Votes	%
Republican	Kyle W. Hindman (incumbent)	22,098	35.99%
Republican	Bob Williams (incumbent)	22,061	35.93%
Democratic	R. Wes Stephens	17,146	27.93%
Independent	Jack C. Bramlette	92	0.15%
Total votes		61,397	100.00%
Republican hold			
Republican hold			

=== District 16 ===
Primary Election Results
Party	Candidate	Votes	%
Democratic Party Primary Results
Democratic	Jerry Benson	5,528	100.00%
Total votes		5,528	100.00%
Republican Party Primary Results
Republican	Karen Mills (incumbent)	8,991	55.83%
Republican	Dave McCarroll (incumbent)	7,112	44.17%
Total votes		16,103	100.00%

General Election Results
Party	Candidate	Votes	%
Republican	Karen Mills (incumbent)	19,818	38.97%
Republican	Dave McCarroll (incumbent)	16,031	31.52%
Democratic	Jerry Benson	15,003	29.50%
Total votes		50,852	100.00%
Republican hold			
Republican hold			

=== District 17 ===
Primary Election Results
Party	Candidate	Votes	%
Republican Party Primary Results
Republican	Brenda Burns (incumbent)	10,511	43.31%
Republican	Robert "Bob" Burns (incumbent)	9,903	40.81%
Republican	Cecil D. White	3,853	15.88%
Total votes		24,267	100.00%

General Election Results
Party	Candidate	Votes	%
Republican	Brenda Burns (incumbent)	23,665	53.79%
Republican	Robert "Bob" Burns (incumbent)	20,334	46.21%
Total votes		43,999	100.00%
Republican hold			
Republican hold			

=== District 18 ===
Primary Election Results
Party	Candidate	Votes	%
Republican Party Primary Results
Republican	Jane Dee Hull (incumbent)	9,144	41.46%
Republican	Susan Gerard (incumbent)	8,925	40.47%
Republican	Fleeta Baldwin	3,984	18.07%
Total votes		22,053	100.00%

General Election Results
Party	Candidate	Votes	%
Republican	Susan Gerard (incumbent)	19,598	50.26%
Republican	Jane Dee Hull (incumbent)	19,265	49.40%
Independent	Ernest Hancock	101	0.26%
Republican	Robert L. Stanford	33	0.08%
Total votes		38,997	100.00%
Republican hold			
Republican hold			

=== District 19 ===
Primary Election Results
Party	Candidate	Votes	%
Democratic Party Primary Results
Democratic	June M. Merrill	6,983	100.00%
Total votes		6,983	100.00%
Republican Party Primary Results
Republican	Nancy Wessel (incumbent)	13,091	53.68%
Republican	Don Kenney (incumbent)	11,148	45.71%
Republican	Howard Faltz	150	0.62%
Total votes		24,389	100.00%

General Election Results
Party	Candidate	Votes	%
Republican	Nancy Wessel (incumbent)	29,802	38.74%
Republican	Don Kenney (incumbent)	26,645	34.64%
Democratic	June M. Merrill	20,481	26.62%
Total votes		76,928	100.00%
Republican hold			
Republican hold			

=== District 20 ===
Primary Election Results
Party	Candidate	Votes	%
Democratic Party Primary Results
Democratic	Debbie McCune-Davis (incumbent)	5,171	55.15%
Democratic	Bobby Raymond (incumbent)	4,205	44.85%
Total votes		9,376	100.00%
Republican Party Primary Results
Republican	Judith Connell	6,399	93.39%
Republican	Robert Blendu	453	6.61%
Total votes		6,852	100.00%

General Election Results
Party	Candidate	Votes	%
Democratic	Debbie McCune-Davis (incumbent)	13,048	28.99%
Democratic	Bobby Raymond (incumbent)	12,338	27.41%
Republican	Judith Connell	10,728	23.83%
Republican	Robert Blendu	8,892	19.76%
NPD - No Party Designated	Harold B. Hayden	5	0.01%
Total votes		45,011	100.00%
Democratic hold			
Democratic hold			

=== District 21 ===
Primary Election Results
Party	Candidate	Votes	%
Democratic Party Primary Results
Democratic	Sandra J. Dudden	4,892	56.48%
Democratic	Daniel D. Cardenas	3,769	43.52%
Total votes		8,661	100.00%
Republican Party Primary Results
Republican	Stan Barnes (incumbent)	11,692	52.36%
Republican	Leslie Whiting Johnson (incumbent)	10,637	47.64%
Total votes		22,329	100.00%

General Election Results
Party	Candidate	Votes	%
Republican	Stan Barnes (incumbent)	22,227	29.83%
Republican	Leslie Whiting Johnson (incumbent)	21,186	28.43%
Democratic	Sandra J. Dudden	17,018	22.84%
Democratic	Daniel D. Cardenas	14,084	18.90%
Total votes		74,515	100.00%
Republican hold			
Republican hold			

=== District 22 ===
Primary Election Results
Party	Candidate	Votes	%
Democratic Party Primary Results
Democratic	Art Hamilton (incumbent)	3,861	52.36%
Democratic	Earl V. Wilcox (incumbent)	3,513	47.64%
Total votes		7,374	100.00%

General Election Results
Party	Candidate	Votes	%
Democratic	Art Hamilton (incumbent)	8,530	50.84%
Democratic	Earl V. Wilcox (incumbent)	8,249	49.16%
Total votes		16,779	100.00%
Democratic hold			
Democratic hold			

=== District 23 ===
Primary Election Results
Party	Candidate	Votes	%
Democratic Party Primary Results
Democratic	Sandra Kennedy (incumbent)	3,769	45.67%
Democratic	Armando Ruiz (incumbent)	2,930	35.50%
Democratic	Sam Lopez	1,554	18.83%
Total votes		8,253	100.00%

General Election Results
Party	Candidate	Votes	%
Democratic	Sandra Kennedy (incumbent)	8,053	55.29%
Democratic	Armando Ruiz (incumbent)	6,513	44.71%
Total votes		14,566	100.00%
Democratic hold			
Democratic hold			

=== District 24 ===
Primary Election Results
Party	Candidate	Votes	%
Republican Party Primary Results
Republican	Sue Grace	9,704	27.57%
Republican	Candice Nagel (incumbent)	9,668	27.47%
Republican	Gary Giordano	8,641	24.55%
Republican	Larry Snow	7,187	20.42%
Total votes		35,200	100.00%

General Election Results
Party	Candidate	Votes	%
Republican	Candice Nagel (incumbent)	29,661	51.47%
Republican	Sue Grace	27,854	48.33%
Republican	Dan Rose	117	0.20%
Total votes		57,632	100.00%
Republican hold			
Republican hold			

=== District 25 ===
Primary Election Results
Party	Candidate	Votes	%
Democratic Party Primary Results
Democratic	Sue Laybe (incumbent)	4,669	53.92%
Democratic	Chris Cummiskey	3,990	46.08%
Total votes		8,659	100.00%
Republican Party Primary Results
Republican	Margaret Updike (incumbent)	5,808	33.68%
Republican	John King	5,279	30.61%
Republican	Ron Vander Ark	3,478	20.17%
Republican	Phil Galbraith	2,680	15.54%
Total votes		17,245	100.00%

General Election Results
Party	Candidate	Votes	%
Democratic	Sue Laybe (incumbent)	13,323	25.96%
Democratic	Chris Cummiskey	13,070	25.47%
Republican	Margaret Updike (incumbent)	12,496	24.35%
Republican	John King	12,300	23.97%
Libertarian	Richard Bistany	128	0.25%
Total votes		51,317	100.00%
Democratic hold			
Democratic gain from Republican			

=== District 26 ===
Primary Election Results
Party	Candidate	Votes	%
Republican Party Primary Results
Republican	Jim Meredith (incumbent)	8,404	38.80%
Republican	Greg Patterson	6,776	31.28%
Republican	Jim Miller (incumbent)	6,482	29.92%
Total votes		21,662	100.00%

General Election Results
Party	Candidate	Votes	%
Republican	Jim Meredith (incumbent)	17,992	52.20%
Republican	Greg Patterson	16,476	47.80%
Total votes		34,468	100.00%
Republican hold			
Republican hold			

=== District 27 ===
Primary Election Results
Party	Candidate	Votes	%
Democratic Party Primary Results
Democratic	Pat Walsh	5,585	64.60%
Democratic	Vince Herman (Note: The official canvas does not document why Herman did not appear on the general election ballot.)	3,038	35.14%
Democratic	Ray Pedersen	22	0.25%
Total votes		8,645	100.00%
Republican Party Primary Results
Republican	Bev Hermon (incumbent)	8,690	51.09%
Republican	Gary Richardson	8,320	48.91%
Total votes		17,010	100.00%

General Election Results
Party	Candidate	Votes	%
Republican	Bev Hermon (incumbent)	22,142	37.23%
Republican	Gary Richardson	19,012	31.97%
Democratic	Pat Walsh	18,316	30.80%
Total votes		59,470	100.00%
Republican hold			
Republican hold			

=== District 28 ===
Primary Election Results
Party	Candidate	Votes	%
Democratic Party Primary Results
Democratic	Bill Searle	6,063	100.00%
Total votes		6,063	100.00%
Republican Party Primary Results
Republican	Lisa Graham	16,522	39.36%
Republican	David Schweikert	10,473	24.95%
Republican	Arthur D. Nelson	9,753	23.23%
Republican	John H. Weisneck	5,228	12.45%
Total votes		41,976	100.00%

General Election Results
Party	Candidate	Votes	%
Republican	Lisa Graham	40,925	44.40%
Republican	David Schweikert	31,175	33.82%
Democratic	Bill Searle	20,051	21.75%
Republican	Bonnie Francis	30	0.03%
Total votes		92,181	100.00%
Republican hold			
Republican hold			

=== District 29 ===
Primary Election Results
Party	Candidate	Votes	%
Democratic Party Primary Results
Democratic	John M. Vidourek	3,599	100.00%
Total votes		3,599	100.00%
Republican Party Primary Results
Republican	Lela Steffey (incumbent)	8,176	36.72%
Republican	Pat Blake	5,724	25.71%
Republican	Darrel A. Harper	4,620	20.75%
Republican	Keith Edward Russell	3,747	16.83%
Total votes		22,267	100.00%

General Election Results
Party	Candidate	Votes	%
Republican	Pat Blake	17,632	40.30%
Republican	Lela Steffey (incumbent)	15,834	36.19%
Democratic	John M. Vidourek	10,287	23.51%
Total votes		43,753	100.00%
Republican hold			
Republican hold			

=== District 30 ===
Primary Election Results
Party	Candidate	Votes	%
Democratic Party Primary Results
Democratic	Eileen Fellner	7,569	100.00%
Total votes		7,569	100.00%
Republican Party Primary Results
Republican	Mark W. Killian (incumbent)	17,266	42.65%
Republican	William "Bill" A. Mundell (incumbent)	12,012	29.67%
Republican	Larry J. Chesley	11,205	27.68%
Total votes		40,483	100.00%

General Election Results
Party	Candidate	Votes	%
Republican	Mark W. Killian (incumbent)	34,967	36.92%
Republican	William "Bill" A. Mundell (incumbent)	33,595	35.47%
Democratic	Eileen Fellner	26,156	27.61%
Total votes		94,718	100.00%
Republican hold			
Republican hold			
