= Senator Springer =

Senator Springer may refer to:

- Carol Springer (1936–2018), Arizona State Senate
- Drew Springer (born 1966), Texas State Senate

== See also ==
- George E. Spring (1859–1917), New York State Senate
