= Candice Nagel =

Former state legislator in Arizona

Candice Nagel is a former state legislator in Arizona. A Republican, she lived in Phoenix and represented Maricopa County in 1989 and 1991. She resigned during her second term. She grew up in Avondale. She was described by the Phoenix New Times as a moderate Republican in an article detailing AzScam and her falling afoul of the police investigation after being recorded making disparaging comments about some of her fellow legislators despite not committing the crimes in which fellow legislators were involved.

== See also ==
- Female state legislators in the United States
