= David Petersen (Arizona politician) =

American politician (born 1950)

39th Treasurer of Arizona
- In office 2003–2006
- Preceded by: Carol Springer
- Succeeded by: Elliott Hibbs

Member of the Arizona Senate from the 29th district
- In office January 1995 – January 2003
- Preceded by: Lester Pearce

Personal details
- Born: 1950 (age 75–76)
- Party: Republican
- Profession: Politician

David Petersen is a politician from Arizona. Petersen served as state treasurer from 2003 to 2006 and in the Arizona State Senate from January 1995 through January 2003. He was first elected to the Senate in November 1994, representing District 29, and was re-elected in 1996, 1998, and 2000. Term limited in 2002, he did not run for re-election and instead was elected state treasurer.

As state treasurer, it was uncovered that Petersen controversially performed work for several nonprofits at taxpayer expense. Petersen resigned as treasurer in 2006 and pled guilty to one misdemeanor count of failing to report income.

Petersen's son, Paul Petersen, served as the Maricopa County Assessor between 2013 and 2020. The younger Petersen resigned after being charged with fraud and human smuggling associated with his private adoption law practice.
