= Victor Soltero =

American politician (born 1938)

Member of the Arizona Senate from the 29th district
- In office 2003–2008

Personal details
- Born: August 6, 1938 (age 87) Globe, Arizona
- Party: Democratic
- Spouse: Mary
- Education: Pima Community College (attended)

Victor E. Soltero (born August 6, 1938) is a Democratic politician. He served as Arizona State Senator for District 29 from 2003 to 2008, and earlier from 1991 through 2000. He was a member of the Arizona House of Representatives from 2000 through 2003, and Mayor of the City of South Tucson from 1988 through 1999.

== Early life ==
Soltero was born on August 6, 1938 in Globe, Arizona, and moved to South Tucson, Arizona around the age of four. He graduated from Pueblo High School in Tucson, Arizona in 1957 and later attended Pima Community College. Soltero worked as an aircraft electrician in the Arizona Air National Guard from 1956 to 1962 and a grounds maintenance field supervisor for the Tucson Unified School District from 1963 to 1991, retiring from the latter following his appointment to the Arizona State Senate.

== Political career ==
On December 8, 1980, Soltero was appointed to the South Tucson city council on a 4–1 vote, with one abstention, to fill a two-month vacancy left by the resignation of Frank Lopez. He had previously served on several city committees and was on the Merit System Commission at the time. Soltero was twice reelected to his city council seat.

On May 2, 1988, Soltero was unanimously appointed mayor of South Tucson by the city council, replacing Dan Eckstrom, the 15-year incumbent who resigned to become a Pima County Supervisor. Later that year, he inaugurated the city's new municipal complex and named it after Eckstrom to honor his service to the "square-mile city".

In March 1991, Soltero was one of 15 applicants who applied to represent the 10th district in the Arizona State Senate, a seat vacated by Jesus "Chuy" Higuera due to his resignation amid a corruption investigation. From there, Soltero was one of three finalists recommended by a six-member citizens' committee. He was appointed to fill the State Senate vacancy via a 4–1 vote by the Pima County Board of Supervisors on March 29 and sworn in on April 1 along with Armando Ruiz. In his first day in office, Soltero voted on 76 bills which had been backed up, including five campaign reform laws. "It's a little difficult, but it's like getting into any other [new] situation," he said about his eventful first day. "At first it, it seems quite a bit more difficult than it actually turns out to be."

In 1992, Soltero sponsored a bill that would have appropriated $250,000 for a southside Tucson health center for victims of Trichloroethylene (TCE)-contaminated ground water. The TCE-contaminated area near the Tucson International Airport had previously been declared a federal Superfund site in 1983.

In the 1992 election, Soltero ran unopposed in the Democratic primary before defeating Libertarian challenger Arthur Kerschen in the general election.
