= Susan Gerard =

American politician (born 1950)

Member of the Arizona Senate from the 18th district
- In office January 2001 – January 2003
- Preceded by: Marc Spitzer

Member of the Arizona House of Representatives from the 18th district
- In office January 1989 – January 2001
- Preceded by: George Weisz
- Succeeded by: Deb Gullett; James Kraft

Personal details
- Born: June 13, 1950 (age 76) Englewood, New Jersey, U.S.
- Party: Republican
- Spouse: Phillip
- Education: Drake University (BA); Arizona State University, Tempe (MBA)

Susan Gerard (born June 13, 1950) is a former member of both the Arizona State Senate and the Arizona House of Representatives. She served in the House from January 1989 until January 2001, and in the Senate from January 2001 through January 2003. She was first elected to the House in November 1988, representing District 18, and was re-elected five times, in 1990, 1992, 1994, 1996, and 1998. In 2000 she ran for the State Senate seat in the same district and won. After redistricting in 2002, she ran for re-election in District 11, but lost in the Republican primary to Barbara Leff.
