= John Greene (Arizona politician) =

American politician

President of the Arizona Senate
- In office January 1, 1993 – December 31, 1996
- Preceded by: Pete Rios
- Succeeded by: Brenda Burns

Member of the Arizona Senate from the 24th district
- In office January 1, 1991 – December 31, 1996
- Preceded by: Pete Corpstein
- Succeeded by: Sue Grace

Personal details
- Born: c. 1948 New York
- Died: October 2, 2013 Phoenix, Arizona
- Party: Republican
- Education: St. John's University, New York University
- Profession: lawyer

John Allan Greene was an American politician, who served in the Arizona State Senate from 1991 to 1996. A member of the Arizona Republican Party, he represented the 24th Senate District, and served as president of the senate from 1993 until the end of his term.

A native of New York, Greene was educated in law at St. John's University and New York University before launching his career in corporate and tax law.

Following the end of his term in the state senate, he was appointed as head of the state insurance department in 1997 by Governor Fife Symington. He was a candidate in the Republican primaries for the Arizona Attorney General election in 2002, losing to Andrew Thomas. He subsequently announced his candidacy for the Republican nomination for Governor of Arizona in the 2006 Arizona gubernatorial election, but withdrew from the race.

In 2011, he was appointed as director of the Arizona Department of Revenue by governor Jan Brewer, holding that role until his death in 2013.
