= Marc Spitzer =

American politician

Commissioner of the Federal Energy Regulatory Commission
- In office July 21, 2006 – December 14, 2011
- President: George W. Bush; Barack Obama

Member of the Arizona Senate from the 18th district
- In office January 1993 – January 2001
- Preceded by: Nancy L. Hill
- Succeeded by: Susan Gerard

Personal details
- Born: September 12, 1957 (age 68) Pittsburgh, Pennsylvania
- Party: Republican
- Children: 1
- Education: University of Michigan Law School (JD); Dickinson College (BA)
- Profession: Politician, Lawyer

Marc Spitzer (born September 12, 1957) is a former member of the Arizona State Senate. He served in the Senate from January 1993 through January 2001, representing district 18. The amendment to the Arizona Constitution which limited politicians to serving four consecutive terms in either house was passed in 1992, preventing Spitzer from running again in November 2000. In 2000, Spitzer was elected to the Arizona Corporation Commission, where he served from January 2001 to July 2006.

Nominated by President G.W. Bush in June 2006 and confirmed by unanimous vote of the US Senate on July 14, 2006, Spitzer also served as Commissioner for the Federal Energy Regulatory Commission from July 21, 2006 – December 14, 2011. Currently, Spitzer is an attorney at Steptoe & Johnson LLP in Washington, DC. He resides in McLean, VA.
