= Stan Barnes (politician) =

American politician

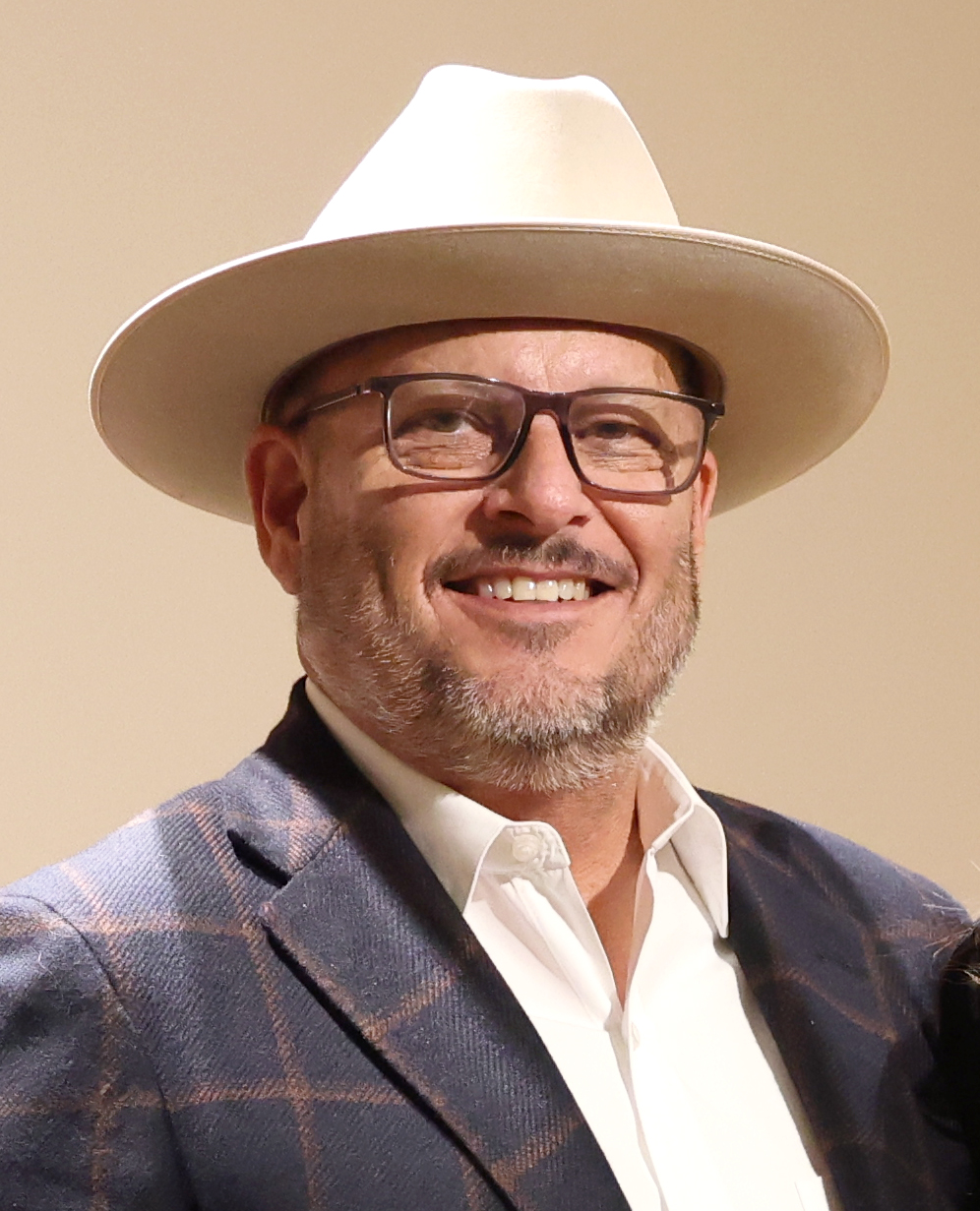

Member of the Arizona Senate from the 21st district
- In office January 9, 1995 – January 13, 1997
- Preceded by: Matt Salmon
- Succeeded by: Russell Bowers

Member of the Arizona House of Representatives from the 21st district
- In office January 9, 1989 – January 11, 1993
- Preceded by: Bob Broughton
- Succeeded by: Russell Bowers

Personal details
- Born: August 18, 1961 (age 64) Mesa, Arizona, U.S.
- Party: Republican

Stan Barnes (born August 18, 1961) is an American politician who served in the Arizona House of Representatives from the 21st district from 1989 to 1993 and in the Arizona Senate from the 21st district from 1995 to 1997.
