= Ann Day =

American politician (1938–2016)

Member of the Arizona Senate from the 12th district
- In office January 14, 1991 – January 8, 2001
- Preceded by: John Mawhinney
- Succeeded by: Toni Hellon

Personal details
- Born: Eleanor Ann Day; August 10, 1938 El Paso, Texas, U.S
- Died: May 7, 2016 (aged 77) Tucson, Arizona, U.S
- Party: Republican
- Spouse(s): Gene Simpson (m. 1958; div. 1970) Scott Alexander (m. 1971, divorced)
- Relatives: Sandra Day O'Connor (sister)
- Education: Arizona State University (BA); University of Arizona (MEd)
- Occupation: Politician, teacher

Eleanor Ann Day (August 10, 1938 – May 7, 2016) was an American politician and educator who served as a member of the Arizona Senate from 1991 to 2001. Day was the younger sister of Supreme Court justice Sandra Day O'Connor.

== Early life and education ==
Born in El Paso, Texas, Day received her bachelor's degree in education from Arizona State University and her master's degree in counseling and guidance from University of Arizona.

== Career ==
Day taught in the Alhambra and Tucson School Districts in Arizona. She also was a marriage and family therapist for the Pima County Conciliation Court. Day served in the Arizona Senate from 1990 to 2000 as a Republican. She then served on the Pima County, Arizona Board of Supervisors from 2000 to 2012. She also served on the Arizona Industrial Commission.

== Personal life ==
Day was the sister of retired United States Supreme Court justice Sandra Day O'Connor. She was married twice: first to Manford Eugene "Gene" Simpson on November 1, 1958, and then to state senator John Scott Alexander on June 12, 1971. Both marriages ended in divorce. On May 7, 2016, Day was killed in an automobile accident by a drunk driver involving three vehicles near Tucson, Arizona.
