= Pete Rios =

American politician

Member of the Arizona House of Representatives from the 23rd district
- In office January 2005 – January 2009
- Preceded by: Ernest Bustmante
- Succeeded by: Franklin Pratt

Member of the Arizona Senate
- In office January 1997 – January 2005
- Preceded by: Robert Chastain
- Succeeded by: Rebecca Rios
- Constituency: 7th district (1997–2003); 23rd district (2003–2005)
- In office January 1983 – January 1995
- Preceded by: William L. Swink
- Succeeded by: Robert Chastain
- Constituency: 7th district

President of the Arizona Senate
- In office 1991–1992
- Preceded by: Bob Usdane
- Succeeded by: John Greene

Personal details
- Born: Hayden, Arizona
- Party: Democratic
- Spouse: Gloria
- Children: Rebecca, Danita Jelani, and Peter Anthony
- Profession: Politician

Pete Rios was a member of the Arizona House of Representatives and the Arizona Senate, serving two stretches in the Senate and a single term in the House. He first ran, unsuccessfully, for the House in 1980. In 1982 he ran for the State Senate, winning the seat from Arizona's 7th District. He won re-election in 1984, 1986, 1988, 1990, and 1992. He served as the Senate President during the 40th Legislature from 1991 to 1992. In 1994, he did not run for re-election to the Senate, instead choosing to run for the Arizona Secretary of State, a bid for which he was unsuccessful. In 1996 Rios once again ran for the Senate, regaining his seat in District 7. He won election three times, the first two in 1998 and 2000 to District, and then to District 23 in 2002, after re-districting. In 2004, due to Arizona's term limit laws, Rios was unable to run again for the Senate, and chose to run for the House seat from District 23, which he won. He won re-election in 2006. He did not run for re-election in 2008.
