= Chris Cummiskey =

American politician

Member of the Arizona Senate from the 25th district
- In office January 1995 – January 2003
- Preceded by: Chuck Blanchard

Member of the Arizona House of Representatives from the 25th district
- In office January 1991 – January 1995
- Preceded by: Margaret Updike
- Succeeded by: Ken Cheuvront; Robert Updike

Personal details
- Born: August 15, 1964 (age 61) Point Pleasant, New Jersey
- Party: Democratic
- Profession: Politician

Chris Cummiskey (born August 15, 1964) is a former member of both the Arizona State Senate and the Arizona House of Representatives. He served in the House from January 1991 until January 1995, and in the Senate from January 1995 through January 2003. He was first elected to the House in November 1990, representing District 25, and was re-elected in 1992.

In 1994 he ran for the State Senate from the district, and won. He was re-elected in 1996, 1998, and 2000.
