= Cindy Resnick =

American politician

Member of the Arizona Senate from the 14th district
- In office January 14, 1991 – January 9, 1995
- Preceded by: William J. DeLong
- Succeeded by: Ruth Solomon

Member of the Arizona House of Representatives from the 14th district
- In office January 10, 1983 – January 14, 1991
- Preceded by: William J. DeLong; Elizabeth H. Macy
- Succeeded by: Herschella Horton

Personal details
- Born: July 31, 1949 (age 76) Three Rivers, Michigan
- Party: Democratic

Cindy Resnick (born July 31, 1949) is an American politician who served in the Arizona House of Representatives from the 14th district from 1983 to 1991 and in the Arizona Senate from the 14th district from 1991 to 1995.
