= Gary Richardson (Arizona politician) =

American politician

Member of the Arizona Senate from the 27th district
- In office January 1995 – January 1999
- Preceded by: Bev Hermon
- Succeeded by: Harry E. Mitchell

Personal details
- Party: Republican
- Profession: Politician

Gary Richardson is a former member of the Arizona State Senate. He served two terms in the Senate from January 1995 through January 1999, representing district 27. He ran for re-election in 2000, but lost in the general election to Harry E. Mitchell.
