= Thomas C. Patterson =

American politician

Thomas Patterson

Member of the Arizona Senate from the 26th district
- In office January 1989 – January 1999
- Preceded by: Peter Kay
- Succeeded by: Tom Smith

Personal details
- Born: August 18, 1945 (age 80) Omaha, Nebraska
- Party: Republican
- Spouse: Jeanne
- Profession: Politician

Thomas C. Patterson (born August 18, 1945) is a former member of the Arizona State Senate and was chairman of the Goldwater Institute from 2000 to July 2015.

Patterson served five terms in the Senate from January 1989 through January 1999, representing district 26. He served as minority leader from 1991 to 1992 and majority leader from 1993 to 1996. He did not run for re-election in 2000.

Patterson was the author of legislation creating Arizona's charter school system and welfare reform program. Until 1998, he was a practicing physician and president of Emergency Physicians, Inc.. Patterson also served as president of the Arizona chapter of the American College of Emergency Physicians. He is a graduate of Yale University and the University of Nebraska–Lincoln.
