= James Henderson Jr. =

American politician (1942–2022)

Member of the Arizona Senate from the 5th district
- In office January 1985 – January 1999
- Preceded by: Arthur J. Hubbard Sr.
- Succeeded by: Jack C. Jackson

Personal details
- Born: May 16, 1942 Ganado, Arizona, U.S.
- Died: December 30, 2022 (aged 80) Gallup, New Mexico, U.S.
- Party: Democratic
- Spouse: Deborah
- Profession: Politician

James Henderson Jr. (May 16, 1942 – December 30, 2022) was an American politician who was a member of the Arizona State Senate. He served seven terms in the Senate from January 1985 through January 1999, representing district 3. He ran for an eighth term in 2000, but was narrowly defeated in the Democratic primary by Jack C. Jackson.
