= Carol Springer =

American politician (1936–2018)

38th Treasurer of Arizona
- In office January 1999 – January 2003
- Governor: Jane Dee Hull
- Preceded by: Tony West
- Succeeded by: David Petersen

Member of the Arizona Senate from the 1st district
- In office January 1991 – January 1999
- Preceded by: John U. Hays
- Succeeded by: Ken Bennett

Personal details
- Born: December 5, 1936 Buena Vista, Colorado, U.S.
- Died: August 9, 2018 (aged 81) Prescott, Arizona, U.S.
- Party: Republican

Carol Springer (née Purkeypile; December 5, 1936 – August 9, 2018) was an American politician who served as the State Treasurer of Arizona from January 1999 until January 2003. A Republican, she was elected in November 1998.

During her tenure, all five of Arizona's statewide executive offices were held by women: Governor Jane Dee Hull, Secretary of State Betsey Bayless, Attorney General Janet Napolitano, Springer, and Superintendent of Public Instruction Lisa Graham Keegan.

Springer served as an Arizona State Senator for District 1 between 1990 and 1998. She ran in the 2002 gubernatorial primary election as a Republican. In 2005 she assumed the position of Yavapai County Supervisor.
