= Gus Arzberger =

American politician (1921–2016)

Member of the Arizona Senate from the 8th district
- In office January 1989 – January 2001
- Preceded by: Carol MacDonald
- Succeeded by: Marsha Arzberger

Personal details
- Born: October 29, 1921
- Died: November 25, 2016 (aged 95)
- Party: Democratic
- Spouse: Marsha
- Profession: Politician

Gus Arzberger (October 29, 1921 – November 25, 2016) was a member of the Arizona State Senate. He served six terms in the Senate from January 1989 through January 2001, representing district 8. The amendment to the Arizona Constitution which limited politicians to serving four consecutive terms in either house was passed in 1992, after he had already served two terms.
