= Keith Bee =

American politician and felon

Keith A. Bee

Member of the Arizona Senate from the 9th district
- In office January 1993 – January 2001
- Preceded by: John E. Dougherty
- Succeeded by: Timothy S. Bee

Personal details
- Born: December 5, 1965 (age 60) Tucson, Arizona
- Party: Republican
- Profession: Politician

Keith A. Bee (born December 5, 1965) is a retired judge, federal felon, and former member of the Arizona House of Representatives and the Arizona State Senate.

== House & Senate ==
Bee served in the Arizona State House from January 1991 to January 1993. He then served in the State Senate from January 1993 to January 2001, representing District 9.

He was succeeded in office by his brother, Timothy. In 2002, Bee was an unsuccessful candidate in the Republican primary for Arizona Superintendent of Public Instruction.

== Justice Court ==
In 2007, he was appointed as Justice of the Peace Bee. He faced an election challenge from Wesley Kent for the September 2, 2008 primary and initially lost. He took the case to the Arizona Supreme Court and prevailed.

== Tax evasion ==
Justice of the Peace Bee resigned on August 4, 2018. Reports published shortly afterward indicated that his early departure was likely related to a four-count federal indictment alleging the filing of false statements on three years of tax returns for his business, Bee Line Bus Transportation. A change-of-plea hearing was scheduled for August 27, 2021.

Bee subsequently pleaded guilty to Count 3 of the indictment, which charged that on October 15, 2014, he filed a false Internal Revenue Service Form 1040 reporting $4,441,113 in business expenses. The figure included personal expenses and the depreciation of personal assets treated as business assets, which Bee acknowledged he did not believe to be accurate. Sentencing was initially set for November 9, but on October 8 the parties filed a stipulation requesting that the date be vacated and reset.

On November 29, Defense Counsel Michael Piccarreta and Assistant United States Attorney David R. Zipps filed a second stipulation to continue sentencing. Piccarreta was engaged in a separate vehicular-murder trial scheduled to begin on February 15, 2022, and the defense stated it required additional time to prepare objections to the Presentence Investigation Report. Judge James Soto granted the request, setting a new sentencing date of March 16, 2022, at 3:00 p.m. Objections to the Presentence Investigation Report were due January 14, 2022, and the government was directed to file responses by February 11, 2022. Bee faced a potential sentence of up to ten months in prison or home confinement, along with $343,000 in restitution to the Internal Revenue Service.

On March 16, 2022, Bee was sentenced by U.S. District Judge James A. Soto to six months in federal prison, followed by one year of supervised release. He was ordered to pay $343,000 in restitution and interest. Although public records indicated that Bee owned real estate valued at more than $3 million, his attorney described him as indigent, and the court waived a potential fine of $250,000 on the basis that he lacked the ability to pay.

== Prison ==
The same Sentencing Minute Entry gave Bee until noon on June 15, 2022, to self-surrender for service of the sentence at the institution designated by the Bureau of Prisons or the United States Marshal. Inmate Keith Allan Bee was assigned Federal Register Number 02716–508 by the Federal Bureau of Prisons and released from Federal Prison on November 28, 2022 for a total prison stay of five months and 13 days.

== Bee Line Bus Transportation, LLC & Baboquivari School District ==
Bee continues his involvement in the school transportation industry. Baboquivari School District was the subject of a 2024 Arizona Auditor General Report that concluded it was not maintaining transportation records. It is unknown if Bee was hired to address the Report's conclusions.

== Arizona Commission on Judicial Conduct ==
In 2018 the Arizona Commission on Judicial Conduct opened an investigation into Bee, who did not engage with it. In May 2022 it said, "Rather than expend the Commission’s limited resources in pursuing formal charges against an individual who no longer holds judicial office, the Commission has chosen to close its investigation in this matter without an adjudication on the merits. Should former Judge Bee ever return or attempt to return to judicial service in the future, the Commission shall reopen this matter to pursue formal charges."
