= Ruth Solomon =

American politician (born 1941)

Member of the Arizona Senate from the 14th district
- In office January 9, 1995 – January 13, 2003
- Preceded by: Cindy Resnick
- Succeeded by: Bill Brotherton

Member of the Arizona House of Representatives from the 14th district
- In office January 9, 1989 – January 9, 1995
- Preceded by: Jim Green
- Succeeded by: Marion L. Pickens

Personal details
- Born: April 16, 1941 (age 85) Philadelphia, Pennsylvania
- Party: Democratic

Ruth Solomon (born April 16, 1941) is an American politician who served in the Arizona House of Representatives from the 14th district from 1989 to 1995 and in the Arizona Senate from the 14th district from 1995 to 2003.
