= Brenda Burns =

American politician

Arizona Corporation Commissionner
- In office January 1, 2011 – January 1, 2015 Serving with Bob Stump, Bob Burns, Susan Bitter Smith, Gary Pierce
- Preceded by: Kris Mayes
- Succeeded by: Doug Little

Member of the Arizona Senate from the 17th district
- In office January 3, 1995 – January 3, 2003
- Preceded by: Patricia Wright
- Succeeded by: Bob Burns

Member of the Arizona House of Representatives from the 17th district
- In office January 3, 1987 – January 3, 1995 Serving with Sterling Ridge (1987–1989), Bob Burns (1989–1995)
- Preceded by: Patricia Wright
- Succeeded by: Jean McGrath

Personal details
- Born: November 22, 1950 (age 75) Georgia

Brenda Burns (born November 22, 1950) is an American politician, real estate agent and member of the Republican Party from the state of Arizona who served as a member of the Arizona Corporation Commission from 2011 to 2015. Elected in 2010, she was eligible to run for re-election to a second term in 2014 but chose not to do so.

Before entering politics, Burns worked as a real estate agent and helped run a family business. She served in the Arizona House of Representatives from 1987 to 1995, also serving as Majority Leader from 1993 to 1995. Burns then served in the Arizona Senate from 1995 to 2003, also serving as Senate President from 1997 to 2003. She was the first woman to ever serve in either leadership position.

Burns ran for the Corporation Commission in 2010, for one of the two seats to which the top two finishers on the ballot are elected. In the Republican primary, she received 300,698 votes (36.89%), behind incumbent Commissioner Gary Pierce's 323,751 (39.72%) and ahead of former Commissioner Barry Wong’s 190,576 (23.38%). Burns and Pierce supported each other and campaigned against the controversial Wong. Wong, who served temporarily on the Commission in 2006, campaigned on using the Commission to cut off the electricity, natural gas, water and telephone lines to the homes of illegal immigrants. In the general election, Burns received 862,546 votes (29.09%), just ahead of Pierce, who was re-elected in second place with 833,541 votes (28.11%).

Burns was sworn in on January 3, 2011, succeeding term-limited Republican Kris Mayes. Burns said that she wanted to work with the legislature, which had previously proposed legislation that would have stripped many of the powers from the Commission. During her tenure in the legislature, she had fought for limited regulations and remarked that some of her friends found it funny that she had been elected to the regulatory body. Burns clarified: "I never said we don't need rules and regulations. I said they need to make sense." She also called for a "reasonable balance" between economic growth and conserving the state's natural resources. She served alongside Bob Burns, who is no relation.

In April 2013, Burns announced that she would not be running for re-election in 2014. She had been encouraged by supporters to consider running for Governor of Arizona in 2014, but after talking to her husband, decided not to, saying that it "became apparent to us that this was not the right course for me to take." They will instead pursue "several interests, priorities and causes." She and the term-limited Pierce were succeeded by Republicans Doug Little and Thomas Forese, respectively.

In September 2013, Burns published an op-ed in The Arizona Republic, bemoaning the decision by three of her fellow Commissioners to shut down an investigation into electric retail competition. She lamented that Arizona had "hit the "stop" button on 21st century modernization and [we] are stuck with, for now, a 19th-century model of electric service."
