= Patricia Noland =

American politician

Member of the Arizona Senate from the 13th district
- In office January 11, 1993 – January 13, 1997
- Preceded by: David Bartlett
- Succeeded by: George Cunningham

Member of the Arizona House of Representatives from the 13th district
- In office January 9, 1989 – January 11, 1993
- Preceded by: Larry Hawke; David Bartlett
- Succeeded by: Andy Nichols; George Cunningham

Personal details
- Born: December 30, 1945 (age 80) Seattle, Washington
- Party: Republican

Patricia A. Noland (born December 30, 1945) is an American politician who served in the Arizona House of Representatives from the 13th district from 1989 to 1993 and in the Arizona Senate from the 13th district from 1993 to 1997. A Republican, she lived in Tucson and represented Pima County. In addition to her time in the Arizona House of Representatives (1989–1993) and Arizona Senate (1993–1997), Patricia Noland also served as the Pima County Superior Court clerk. Her involvement in Arizona politics spanned multiple roles and reflected her ongoing contributions to her community. She was known for her active participation in state legislation as a member of the Republican Party. Previously, Patricia Noland served as both the town manager and town clerk for Oro Valley, Arizona, from 1982 to 1983. This was before she went on to hold office in the Arizona House of Representatives and Senate. Her involvement in local government played a significant role in her subsequent political career at the state level.(https://www.orovalleyaz.gov/Community/OV-50/Digital-Timeline-Journey-Through-the-Years/Historical-Mayors-Town-Managers-and-Chiefs-of-Police)
