= 2002 Arizona Senate election =

- November 5, 2002

All 30 seats of the Arizona Senate 16 seats needed for a majority
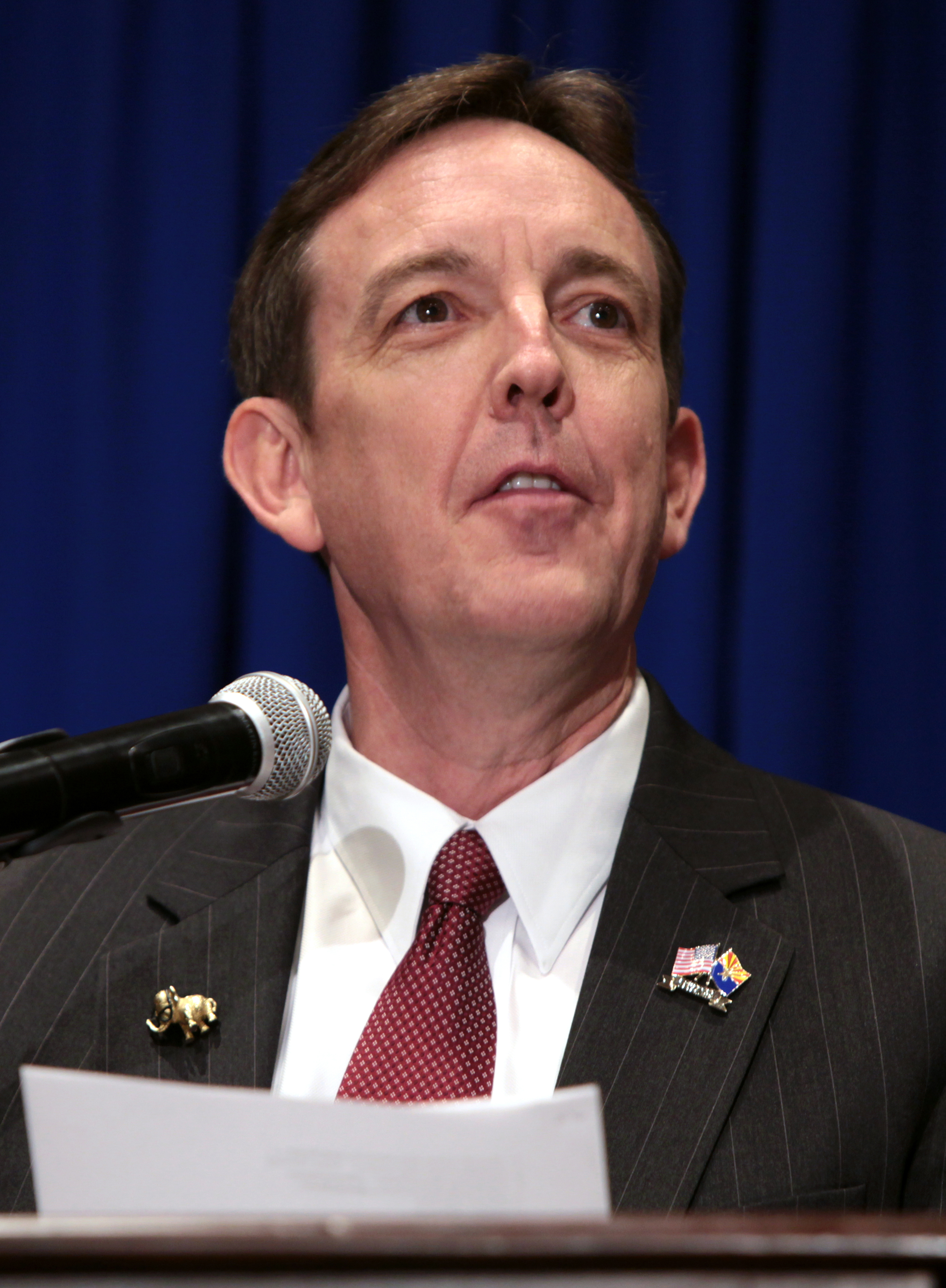

	Majority party	Minority party
Leader	Ken Bennett	Jack A. Brown
Party	Republican	Democratic
Leader's seat	1st	5th
Seats before	15	15
Seats after	17	13
Seat change	▲2	▼2
- Results: Democratic hold Republican hold Republican gain
Senate President before election
Randall Gnant
Republican
Elected Senate President
Ken Bennett
Republican

The 2002 Arizona Senate election was held on November 5, 2002. Voters elected members of the Arizona Senate in all 30 of the state's legislative districts to serve a two-year term. These were the first elections following the 2000 redistricting cycle, which moved many incumbents into new districts. Primary elections were held on September 10, 2002.

Prior to the elections, the Senate was evenly divided between the Republicans and Democrats in a 15-to-15 tie.

Following the election, Republicans took unitary control of the chamber with 17 Republicans to 13 Democrats, a net gain of two seats for Republicans.

The newly elected senators served in the 46th Arizona State Legislature.

== Retiring Incumbents ==
=== Democrats ===
1. District 11: Elaine Richardson
2. District 13: Virginia Yrun
3. District 14: Ruth Solomon
4. District 20: Mary Hartley
5. District 22: Joe Eddie Lopez
6. District 25: Chris Cummiskey
7. District 30: Jay Blanchard

=== Republicans ===
1. District 2: John Verkamp
2. District 16: Darden C. Hamilton
3. District 17: Brenda Burns
4. District 19: Scott Bundgaard
5. District 26: Tom Smith
6. District 28: Randall Gnant
7. District 29: David Petersen

== Incumbents Defeated in Primary Elections ==
=== Democrat ===
1. District 4: Edward Cirillo (Note: Redistricted from district 15 to 4.)

=== Republicans ===
1. District 11: Susan Gerard (Note: Redistricted from district 18 to 11.)
2. District 20: Lori Daniels (Note: Redistricted from district 6 to 20.)

== Predictions ==
Source	Ranking	As of
The Cook; Political Report	Lean R (flip)	October 4, 2002

== Summary of Results by Arizona State Legislative District ==
District	Incumbent	Party	Elected Senator	Outcome
1st	Ken Bennett	Rep	Ken Bennett	Rep Hold
2nd	John Verkamp	Rep	Jack C. Jackson Sr. (Note: Redistricted from district 3 to 2.)	Dem Gain
3rd	Jack C. Jackson	Dem	Linda Binder	Rep Gain
4th	Jack A. Brown (Note: Redistricted from district 4 to 5.)	Dem	Jack W. Harper	Rep Gain
5th	Herb Guenther (Note: Redistricted from district 5 to 24.)	Dem	Jack A. Brown	Dem Hold
6th	Lori Daniels	Rep	Dean Martin (Note: Redistricted from district 24 to 6.)	Rep Hold
7th	Pete Rios (Note: Redistricted from district 7 to 23.)	Dem	Jim Waring	Rep Gain
8th	Marsha Arzberger (Note: Redistricted from district 8 to 25.)	Dem	Carolyn S. Allen	Rep Gain
9th	Tim Bee (Note: Redistricted from district 9 to 30.)	Rep	Robert "Bob" Burns	Rep Hold
10th	Ramon Valadez (Note: Redistricted from district 10 to 29.)	Dem	Jim Weiers	Rep Gain
11th	Elaine Richardson	Dem	Barbara Leff	Rep Gain
12th	Toni Hellon (Note: Redistricted from district 12 to 26.)	Rep	Robert Blendu	Rep Hold
13th	Virginia Yrun (Note: Senator Virginia Yrun was appointed April 24, 2001 by the Pima County Board of Supervisors to fill the vacancy created on April 19, 2001 by the death of Andy Nichols.)	Dem	Richard Miranda	Dem Hold
14th	Ruth Solomon	Dem	Bill Brotherton	Dem Hold
15th	Edward Cirillo	Rep	Ken Cheuvront	Dem Gain
16th	Darden C. Hamilton	Rep	Linda Aguirre (Note: Redistricted from district 23 to 16.)	Dem Gain
17th	Brenda Burns	Rep	Harry Mitchell (Note: Redistricted from district 27 to 17.)	Dem Gain
18th	Susan Gerard	Rep	Mark Anderson	Rep Hold
19th	Scott Bundgaard	Rep	Marilyn Jarrett (Note: Senator Marilyn Jarrett was appointed September 11, 2001 by the Maricopa County Board of Supervisors to fill the vacancy created on August 27, 2001 by the resignation of Russell "Rusty" W. Bowers.) (Note: Redistricted from district 21 to 19.)	Rep Hold
20th	Mary Hartley	Dem	Slade Mead	Rep Gain
21st	Marilyn Jarrett	Rep	Jay Tibshraeny	Rep Hold
22nd	Joe Eddie Lopez	Dem	Thayer Verschoor	Rep Gain
23rd	Linda Aguirre	Dem	Pete Rios	Dem Hold
24th	Dean Martin	Rep	Herb Guenther (Note: Senator Robert C. Cannell was appointed January 24, 2003 by the Yuma County Board of Supervisors to fill the vacancy created in District 24 when Herb Guenther was appointed as Director of the Department of Water Resources and did not take the Oath of Office. Robert C. Cannell was sworn in as Senator on January 27, 2003.)	Dem Gain
25th	Chris Cummiskey	Dem	Marsha Arzberger	Dem Hold
26th	Tom Smith	Rep	Toni Hellon	Rep Hold
27th	Harry Mitchell	Dem	Jorge Luis Garcia	Dem Hold
28th	Randall Gnant	Rep	Gabrielle Giffords	Dem Gain
29th	David Petersen	Rep	Ramón Valadez (Note: Senator Victor Soltero was appointed January 28, 2003 by the Pima County Board of Supervisors to fill the vacancy created in District 29 when Ramón Valadez was appointed Special Assistant to the Governor for Southern Arizona and did not take the Oath of Office. Victor Soltero was sworn in as Senator on January 29, 2003.)	Dem Gain
30th	Jay Blanchard	Dem	Tim Bee	Rep Gain

== Detailed Results ==
=== District 1 ===
Democratic primary results
Party	Candidate	Votes	%
Democratic	Dawn Knight	5,420	54.75%
Democratic	John O'Donnell	2,778	28.06%
Democratic	Robert Donahue	1,701	17.18%
Total votes		9,899	100.00%

Republican primary results
Party	Candidate	Votes	%
Republican	Ken Bennett (incumbent)	18,583	100.00%
Total votes		18,583	100.00%

General election results
Party	Candidate	Votes	%
Republican	Ken Bennett (incumbent)	33,433	57.82%
Democratic	Dawn Knight	24,390	42.18%
Total votes		57,823	100.00%
Republican hold			

=== District 2 ===
Democratic primary results
Party	Candidate	Votes	%
Democratic	Jack C. Jackson, Sr. (incumbent)	11,069	58.21%
Democratic	Rita Johnson	6,579	34.60%
Democratic	Walter Phelps	1,369	7.20%
Total votes		19,017	100.00%

General election results
Party	Candidate	Votes	%
Democratic	Jack C. Jackson, Sr. (incumbent)	33,777	100.00%
Total votes		33,777	100.00%
Democratic gain from Republican			

=== District 3 ===
Democratic primary results
Party	Candidate	Votes	%
Democratic	Jacqueline (Jacquie) Jessie	4,148	100.00%
Total votes		4,148	100.00%

Republican primary results
Party	Candidate	Votes	%
Republican	Linda Binder	9,876	100.00%
Total votes		9,876	100.00%

General election results
Party	Candidate	Votes	%
Republican	Linda Binder	23,972	63.30%
Democratic	Jacqueline (Jacquie) Jessie	13,901	36.70%
Total votes		37,873	100.00%
Republican gain from Democratic			

=== District 4 ===
Republican primary results
Party	Candidate	Votes	%
Republican	Jack W. Harper	10,977	57.45%
Republican	Edward Cirillo (incumbent)	8,129	42.55%
Total votes		19,106	100.00%

General election results
Party	Candidate	Votes	%
Republican	Jack W. Harper	44,455	100.00%
Total votes		44,455	100.00%
Republican gain from Democratic			

=== District 5 ===
Democratic primary results
Party	Candidate	Votes	%
Democratic	Jack A. Brown (incumbent)	10,993	100.00%
Total votes		10,993	100.00%

General election results
Party	Candidate	Votes	%
Democratic	Jack A. Brown (incumbent)	29,874	100.00%
Total votes		29,874	100.00%
Democratic hold			

=== District 6 ===
Democratic primary results
Party	Candidate	Votes	%
Democratic	Stephen Lesjak	2,993	100.00%
Total votes		2,993	100.00%

Republican primary results
Party	Candidate	Votes	%
Republican	Dean Martin (incumbent)	7,261	99.93%
Republican	Luigi Baratta (Note: Was a write-in candidate in the primary election.)	5	0.07%
Total votes		7,266	100.00%

General election results
Party	Candidate	Votes	%
Republican	Dean Martin (incumbent)	25,338	66.69%
Democratic	Stephen Lesjak	12,658	33.31%
Total votes		37,996	100.00%
Republican hold			

=== District 7 ===
Democratic primary results
Party	Candidate	Votes	%
Democratic	Jeff Bollerman	3,227	100.00%
Total votes		3,227	100.00%

Republican primary results
Party	Candidate	Votes	%
Republican	Jim Waring	3,918	39.18%
Republican	David Burnell Smith	3,048	30.48%
Republican	Wes Marsh	3,034	30.34%
Total votes		10,000	100.00%

General election results
Party	Candidate	Votes	%
Republican	Jim Waring	28,326	65.68%
Democratic	Jeff Bollerman	14,801	34.32%
Total votes		43,127	100.00%
Republican gain from Democratic			

=== District 8 ===
Democratic primary results
Party	Candidate	Votes	%
Democratic	Stuart Turnansky	104	100.00%
Total votes		104	100.00%

Republican primary results
Party	Candidate	Votes	%
Republican	Carolyn S. Allen	12,631	100.00%
Total votes		12,631	100.00%

Libertarian Primary Results
Party	Candidate	Votes	%
Libertarian	Orville Weyrich	6	100.00%
Total votes		6	100.00%

General election results
Party	Candidate	Votes	%
Republican	Carolyn S. Allen	44,385	85.44%
Libertarian	Orville Weyrich	7,566	14.56%
Total votes		51,951	100.00%
Republican gain from Democratic			

=== District 9 ===
Democratic primary results
Party	Candidate	Votes	%
Democratic	Lee Gagner	5,182	100.00%
Total votes		5,182	100.00%

Republican primary results
Party	Candidate	Votes	%
Republican	Robert "Bob" Burns	7,913	54.66%
Republican	Bart Turner	3,845	26.56%
Republican	Blaine Donaldson	2,718	18.78%
Total votes		14,476	100.00%

General election results
Party	Candidate	Votes	%
Republican	Robert "Bob" Burns	30,175	64.32%
Democratic	Lee Gagner	16,736	35.68%
Total votes		46,911	100.00%
Republican hold			

=== District 10 ===
Democratic primary results
Party	Candidate	Votes	%
Democratic	Judy Kennedy	3,548	100.00%
Total votes		3,548	100.00%

Republican primary results
Party	Candidate	Votes	%
Republican	Jim Weiers	7,052	100.00%
Total votes		7,052	100.00%

Libertarian Primary Results
Party	Candidate	Votes	%
Libertarian	Manfred Alber	8	100.00%
Total votes		8	100.00%

General election results
Party	Candidate	Votes	%
Republican	Jim Weiers	16,716	53.26%
Democratic	Judy Kennedy	13,601	43.34%
Libertarian	Manfred Alber	1,068	3.40%
Total votes		31,385	100.00%
Republican gain from Democratic			

=== District 11 ===
Democratic primary results
Party	Candidate	Votes	%
Democratic	Stuart Starky	5,638	100.00%
Total votes		5,638	100.00%

Republican primary results
Party	Candidate	Votes	%
Republican	Barbara Leff	8,439	50.11%
Republican	Susan Gerard (incumbent)	8,402	49.89%
Total votes		16,841	100.00%

General election results
Party	Candidate	Votes	%
Republican	Barbara Leff	35,403	64.27%
Democratic	Stuart Starky	19,683	35.73%
Total votes		55,086	100.00%
Republican gain from Democratic			

=== District 12 ===
Democratic primary results
Party	Candidate	Votes	%
Democratic	Peter Mahoney	4,038	100.00%
Total votes		4,038	100.00%

Republican primary results
Party	Candidate	Votes	%
Republican	Robert Blendu	6,833	100.00%
Total votes		6,833	100.00%

General election results
Party	Candidate	Votes	%
Republican	Robert Blendu	18,426	53.76%
Democratic	Peter Mahoney	15,849	46.24%
Total votes		34,275	100.00%
Republican hold			

=== District 13 ===
Democratic primary results
Party	Candidate	Votes	%
Democratic	Richard Miranda	2,352	61.27%
Democratic	Kathi Foster	1,487	38.73%
Total votes		3,839	100.00%

General election results
Party	Candidate	Votes	%
Democratic	Richard Miranda	11,498	100.00%
Total votes		11,498	100.00%
Democratic hold			

=== District 14 ===
Democratic primary results
Party	Candidate	Votes	%
Democratic	Bill Brotherton	2,806	52.20%
Democratic	Earl Wilcox	2,569	47.80%
Total votes		5,375	100.00%

Libertarian Primary Results
Party	Candidate	Votes	%
Libertarian	John Wilde	6	100.00%
Total votes		6	100.00%

General election results
Party	Candidate	Votes	%
Democratic	Bill Brotherton	12,240	80.67%
Libertarian	John Wilde	2,920	19.24%
Independent	Bradley Cashman	8	0.05%
Independent	Don Karg	5	0.03%
Total votes		15,173	100.00%
Democratic hold			

=== District 15 ===
Democratic primary results
Party	Candidate	Votes	%
Democratic	Ken Cheuvront	3,226	62.07%
Democratic	Kathryn Ann Mitchell	1,971	37.93%
Total votes		5,197	100.00%

Republican primary results
Party	Candidate	Votes	%
Republican	Ed Hedges	326	100.00%
Total votes		326	100.00%

General election results
Party	Candidate	Votes	%
Democratic	Ken Cheuvront	12,903	62.56%
Republican	Ed Hedges	7,721	37.44%
Total votes		20,624	100.00%
Democratic gain from Republican			

=== District 16 ===
Democratic primary results
Party	Candidate	Votes	%
Democratic	Linda Aguirre (incumbent)	4,816	100.00%
Total votes		4,816	100.00%

Republican primary results
Party	Candidate	Votes	%
Republican	Thomas (Tom) Pawlenko	3	100.00%
Total votes		3	100.00%

General election results
Party	Candidate	Votes	%
Democratic	Linda Aguirre (incumbent)	13,149	100.00%
Total votes		13,149	100.00%
Democratic gain from Republican			

=== District 17 ===
Democratic primary results
Party	Candidate	Votes	%
Democratic	Harry Mitchell (incumbent)	6,125	100.00%
Total votes		6,125	100.00%

Republican primary results
Party	Candidate	Votes	%
Republican	Laura Knaperek	7,793	100.00%
Total votes		7,793	100.00%

Libertarian Primary Results
Party	Candidate	Votes	%
Libertarian	Yuri Downing	124	100.00%
Total votes		124	100.00%

General election results
Party	Candidate	Votes	%
Democratic	Harry Mitchell (incumbent)	20,610	52.52%
Republican	Laura Knaperek	17,166	43.74%
Libertarian	Yuri Downing	1,467	3.74%
Total votes		39,243	100.00%
Democratic gain from Republican			

=== District 18 ===
Republican primary results
Party	Candidate	Votes	%
Republican	Mark Anderson	8,671	100.00%
Total votes		8,671	100.00%

General election results
Party	Candidate	Votes	%
Republican	Mark Anderson	21,354	99.94%
Independent	Ilias Kostopoulos (Note: Was a write-in candidate in the general election.)	12	0.06%
Total votes		21,366	100.00%
Republican hold			

=== District 19 ===
Democratic primary results
Party	Candidate	Votes	%
Democratic	Paul Cash	4,949	100.00%
Total votes		4,949	100.00%

Republican primary results
Party	Candidate	Votes	%
Republican	Marilyn Jarrett (incumbent)	13,472	100.00%
Total votes		13,472	100.00%

General election results
Party	Candidate	Votes	%
Republican	Marilyn Jarrett (incumbent)	30,960	64.84%
Democratic	Paul Cash	16,785	35.16%
Total votes		47,745	100.00%
Republican hold			

=== District 20 ===
Republican primary results
Party	Candidate	Votes	%
Republican	Slade Mead	5,850	57.25%
Republican	Lori Daniels (incumbent)	4,369	42.75%
Total votes		10,219	100.00%

General election results
Party	Candidate	Votes	%
Republican	Slade Mead	31,099	100.00%
Total votes		31,099	100.00%
Republican gain from Democratic			

=== District 21 ===
Republican primary results
Party	Candidate	Votes	%
Republican	Jay Tibshraeny	8,913	82.54%
Republican	Morris P. Cooper	1,885	17.46%
Total votes		10,798	100.00%

General election results
Party	Candidate	Votes	%
Republican	Jay Tibshraeny	35,669	100.00%
Total votes		35,669	100.00%
Republican hold			

=== District 22 ===
Democratic primary results
Party	Candidate	Votes	%
Democratic	Brent Whiting Brown	3,656	100.00%
Total votes		3,656	100.00%

Republican primary results
Party	Candidate	Votes	%
Republican	Thayer Verschoor	6,204	51.02%
Republican	Cynthia L. Dunham	5,956	48.98%
Total votes		12,160	100.00%

General election results
Party	Candidate	Votes	%
Republican	Thayer Verschoor	28,339	60.86%
Democratic	Brent Whiting Brown	18,226	39.14%
Total votes		46,565	100.00%
Republican gain from Democratic			

=== District 23 ===
Democratic primary results
Party	Candidate	Votes	%
Democratic	Pete Rios (incumbent)	7,957	100.00%
Total votes		7,957	100.00%

General election results
Party	Candidate	Votes	%
Democratic	Pete Rios (incumbent)	19,379	100.00%
Total votes		19,379	100.00%
Democratic hold			

=== District 24 ===
Democratic primary results
Party	Candidate	Votes	%
Democratic	Herb Guenther (incumbent)	5,546	100.00%
Total votes		5,546	100.00%

General election results
Party	Candidate	Votes	%
Democratic	Herb Guenther (incumbent)	17,172	100.00%
Total votes		17,172	100.00%
Democratic gain from Republican			

=== District 25 ===
Democratic primary results
Party	Candidate	Votes	%
Democratic	Marsha Arzberger (incumbent)	9,110	100.00%
Total votes		9,110	100.00%

General election results
Party	Candidate	Votes	%
Democratic	Marsha Arzberger (incumbent)	20,637	61.46%
Independent	Dave Stoddard	12,941	38.54%
Total votes		33,578	100.00%
Democratic hold			

=== District 26 ===
Republican primary results
Party	Candidate	Votes	%
Republican	Toni Hellon (incumbent)	12,224	100.00%
Total votes		12,224	100.00%

General election results
Party	Candidate	Votes	%
Republican	Toni Hellon (incumbent)	42,819	100.00%
Total votes		42,819	100.00%
Republican hold			

=== District 27 ===
Democratic primary results
Party	Candidate	Votes	%
Democratic	Jorge Luis Garcia	6,770	54.69%
Democratic	John Kromko	5,609	45.31%
Total votes		12,379	100.00%

General election results
Party	Candidate	Votes	%
Democratic	Jorge Luis Garcia	23,618	75.83%
Independent	Dale Gorney	7,530	24.17%
Total votes		31,148	100.00%
Democratic hold			

=== District 28 ===
Democratic primary results
Party	Candidate	Votes	%
Democratic	Gabrielle Giffords	11,075	100.00%
Total votes		11,075	100.00%

Libertarian Primary Results
Party	Candidate	Votes	%
Libertarian	Kimberly Swanson	202	100.00%
Total votes		202	100.00%

General election results
Party	Candidate	Votes	%
Democratic	Gabrielle Giffords	31,301	74.19%
Libertarian	Kimberly Swanson	10,888	25.81%
Total votes		42,189	100.00%
Democratic gain from Republican			

=== District 29 ===
Democratic primary results
Party	Candidate	Votes	%
Democratic	Ramon Valadez (incumbent)	7,119	100.00%
Total votes		7,119	100.00%

Republican primary results
Party	Candidate	Votes	%
Republican	Bruce P. Murchison	119	100.00%
Total votes		119	100.00%

General election results
Party	Candidate	Votes	%
Democratic	Ramon Valadez (incumbent)	19,497	100.00%
Total votes		19,497	100.00%
Democratic gain from Republican			

=== District 30 ===
Republican primary results
Party	Candidate	Votes	%
Republican	Tim Bee (incumbent)	15,683	100.00%
Total votes		15,683	100.00%

General election results
Party	Candidate	Votes	%
Republican	Tim Bee (incumbent)	46,915	100.00%
Total votes		46,915	100.00%
Republican gain from Democratic			
