= 2000 Arizona Senate election =

- November 7, 2000

All 30 seats of the Arizona Senate 16 seats needed for a majority
	Majority party	Minority party
Leader	Randall Gnant	Jack A. Brown
Party	Republican	Democratic
Leader's seat	28th	4th
Seats before	16	14
Seats after	15	15
Seat change	▼1	▲1
- Results: Democratic gain Republican hold Democratic hold
Senate President before election
Brenda Burns
Republican
Elected Senate President
Randall Gnant
Republican

The 2000 Arizona Senate election was held on November 7, 2000. Voters elected members of the Arizona Senate in all 30 of the state's legislative districts to serve a two-year term. Primary elections were held on September 12, 2000.

Prior to the elections, the Republicans held a majority of 16 seats over the Democrats' 14 seats.

Following the election, a 15–15 tie forced a power sharing agreement between Democrats and Republicans, a net gain of one seat for Democrats.

The newly elected senators served in the 45th Arizona State Legislature.

== Retiring Incumbents ==
=== Democrats ===
1. District 8: Gus Arzberger
2. District 10: Victor Soltero
3. District 13: George Cunningham

=== Republicans ===
1. District 2: John Wettaw
2. District 6: John Huppenthal
3. District 9: Keith A. Bee
4. District 12: Ann Day
5. District 18: Marc Spitzer
6. District 24: Sue Grace
7. District 30: Tom Freestone

== Summary of Results by Arizona State Legislative District ==
District	Incumbent	Party	Elected Senator	Outcome
1st	Ken Bennett	Rep	Ken Bennett	Rep Hold
2nd	John Wettaw	Rep	John Verkamp	Rep Hold
3rd	Jack C. Jackson	Dem	Jack C. Jackson	Dem Hold
4th	Jack A. Brown	Dem	Jack A. Brown	Dem Hold
5th	Herb Guenther	Dem	Herb Guenther	Dem Hold
6th	John Huppenthal	Rep	Lori Daniels	Rep Hold
7th	Pete Rios	Dem	Pete Rios	Dem Hold
8th	Gus Arzberger	Dem	Marsha Arzberger	Dem Hold
9th	Keith A. Bee	Rep	Tim Bee	Rep Hold
10th	Victor Soltero	Dem	Ramon Valadez	Dem Hold
11th	Elaine Richardson	Dem	Elaine Richardson	Dem Hold
12th	Ann Day	Rep	Toni Hellon	Rep Hold
13th	George Cunningham	Dem	Andy Nichols (Note: Senator Virginia Yrun was appointed April 24, 2001 by the Pima County Board of Supervisors to fill the vacancy created on April 19, 2001 by the death of Andy Nichols.)	Dem Hold
14th	Ruth Solomon	Dem	Ruth Solomon	Dem Hold
15th	Edward J. Cirillo	Rep	Edward J. Cirillo	Rep Hold
16th	Darden C. Hamilton	Rep	Darden C. Hamilton	Rep Hold
17th	Brenda Burns	Rep	Brenda Burns	Rep Hold
18th	Marc Spitzer	Rep	Susan Gerard	Rep Hold
19th	Scott Bundgaard	Rep	Scott Bundgaard	Rep Hold
20th	Mary Hartley	Dem	Mary Hartley	Dem Hold
21st	Russell "Rusty" Bowers	Rep	Russell "Rusty" Bowers (Note: Senator Marilyn Jarrett was appointed September 11, 2001 by the Maricopa County Board of Supervisors to fill the vacancy created on August 27, 2001 by the resignation of Russell "Rusty" W. Bowers.)	Rep Hold
22nd	Joe Eddie Lopez	Dem	Joe Eddie Lopez	Dem Hold
23rd	Linda Aguirre	Dem	Linda Aguirre	Dem Hold
24th	Sue Grace	Rep	Dean Martin	Rep Hold
25th	Chris Cummiskey	Dem	Chris Cummiskey	Dem Hold
26th	Tom Smith	Rep	Tom Smith	Rep Hold
27th	Harry E. Mitchell	Dem	Harry E. Mitchell	Dem Hold
28th	Randall Gnant	Rep	Randall Gnant	Rep Hold
29th	David Petersen	Rep	David Petersen	Rep Hold
30th	Tom Freestone	Rep	Jay Blanchard	Dem Gain

== Detailed Results ==
=== District 1 ===
Democratic primary results
Party	Candidate	Votes	%
Democratic	Dawn Knight	6,718	100.00%
Total votes		6,718	100.00%

Republican primary results
Party	Candidate	Votes	%
Republican	Ken Bennett (incumbent)	20,888	100.00%
Total votes		20,888	100.00%

General election results
Party	Candidate	Votes	%
Republican	Ken Bennett (incumbent)	43,314	58.65%
Democratic	Dawn Knight	30,541	41.35%
Total votes		73,855	100.00%
Republican hold			

=== District 2 ===
Democratic primary results
Party	Candidate	Votes	%
Democratic	Rita Johnson	6,681	100.00%
Total votes		6,681	100.00%

Republican primary results
Party	Candidate	Votes	%
Republican	John Verkamp	7,662	59.48%
Republican	Joe Hart	5,219	40.52%
Total votes		12,881	100.00%

General election results
Party	Candidate	Votes	%
Republican	John Verkamp	30,570	52.91%
Democratic	Rita Johnson	27,207	47.09%
Total votes		57,777	100.00%
Republican hold			

=== District 3 ===
Democratic primary results
Party	Candidate	Votes	%
Democratic	Jack C. Jackson (incumbent)	7,527	50.93%
Democratic	James Henderson Jr.	7,251	49.07%
Total votes		14,778	100.00%

General election results
Party	Candidate	Votes	%
Democratic	Jack C. Jackson (incumbent)	29,776	100.00%
Total votes		29,776	100.00%
Democratic hold			

=== District 4 ===
Democratic primary results
Party	Candidate	Votes	%
Democratic	Jack A. Brown (incumbent)	13,026	100.00%
Total votes		13,026	100.00%

General election results
Party	Candidate	Votes	%
Democratic	Jack A. Brown (incumbent)	33,378	100.00%
Total votes		33,378	100.00%
Democratic hold			

=== District 5 ===
Democratic primary results
Party	Candidate	Votes	%
Democratic	Herb Guenther (incumbent)	5,828	100.00%
Total votes		5,828	100.00%

General election results
Party	Candidate	Votes	%
Democratic	Herb Guenther (incumbent)	22,565	100.00%
Total votes		22,565	100.00%
Democratic hold			

=== District 6 ===
Democratic primary results
Party	Candidate	Votes	%
Democratic	Jim McCarthy (Note: Ran as a write-in candidate in the primary election.)	679	100.00%
Total votes		679	100.00%

Republican primary results
Party	Candidate	Votes	%
Republican	Lori Daniels	2,478	46.99%
Republican	Martin Sepulveda	1,867	35.41%
Republican	Jim Law	817	15.49%
Republican	Glendon Moody	85	1.61%
Republican	Francisco Rodriguez	26	1.61%
Total votes		5,273	100.00%

General election results
Party	Candidate	Votes	%
Republican	Lori Daniels	38,871	57.08%
Democratic	Jim McCarthy	29,225	42.92%
Total votes		68,096	100.00%
Republican hold			

=== District 7 ===
Democratic primary results
Party	Candidate	Votes	%
Democratic	Pete Rios (incumbent)	7,066	100.00%
Total votes		7,066	100.00%

General election results
Party	Candidate	Votes	%
Democratic	Pete Rios (incumbent)	20,411	100.00%
Total votes		20,411	100.00%
Democratic hold			

=== District 8 ===
Democratic primary results
Party	Candidate	Votes	%
Democratic	Marsha Arzberger	9,715	100.00%
Total votes		9,715	100.00%

Republican primary results
Party	Candidate	Votes	%
Republican	Gail Griffin	5,078	100.00%
Total votes		5,078	100.00%

General election results
Party	Candidate	Votes	%
Democratic	Marsha Arzberger	17,330	53.90%
Republican	Gail Griffin	14,824	46.10%
Total votes		32,154	100.00%
Democratic hold			

=== District 9 ===
Democratic primary results
Party	Candidate	Votes	%
Democratic	Kathy Ramage-White	4,579	60.92%
Democratic	Matt Welch	1,541	20.50%
Democratic	Jim Jaster	1,397	18.58%
Total votes		7,517	100.00%

Republican primary results
Party	Candidate	Votes	%
Republican	Tim Bee	6,650	54.13%
Republican	Bill McGibbon	5,635	45.87%
Total votes		12,285	100.00%

Libertarian Primary Results
Party	Candidate	Votes	%
Libertarian	Geoffrey Weber (Note: Candidate withdrew from the race.)	54	83.08%
Libertarian	John J. Auvenshine	11	16.92%
Total votes		65	100.00%

General election results
Party	Candidate	Votes	%
Republican	Tim Bee	35,730	57.05%
Democratic	Kathy Ramage-White	25,448	40.63%
Libertarian	John Jason Auvenshine	1,455	2.32%
Total votes		62,633	100.00%
Republican hold			

=== District 10 ===
Democratic primary results
Party	Candidate	Votes	%
Democratic	Ramon Valadez	3,690	58.66%
Democratic	Sally Ann Gonzales	2,601	41.34%
Total votes		6,291	100.00%

Libertarian Primary Results
Party	Candidate	Votes	%
Libertarian	Dale Gorney	49	100.00%
Total votes		49	100.00%

General election results
Party	Candidate	Votes	%
Democratic	Ramon Valadez	20,513	84.08%
Libertarian	Dale Gorney	3,883	15.92%
Total votes		24,396	100.00%
Democratic hold			

=== District 11 ===
Democratic primary results
Party	Candidate	Votes	%
Democratic	Elaine Richardson (incumbent)	7,624	100.00%
Total votes		7,624	100.00%

Libertarian Primary Results
Party	Candidate	Votes	%
Libertarian	John T. Schmid	66	100.00%
Total votes		66	100.00%

Green Primary Results
Party	Candidate	Votes	%
Green	Chris Ford	47	66.20%
Green	Daniel Patterson	24	33.80%
Total votes		71	100.00%

General election results
Party	Candidate	Votes	%
Democratic	Elaine Richardson (incumbent)	26,086	79.98%
Libertarian	John T. Schmid	3,336	10.23%
Green	Daniel Patterson	3,194	9.79%
Total votes		32,616	100.00%
Democratic hold			

=== District 12 ===
Democratic primary results
Party	Candidate	Votes	%
Democratic	Mark Osterloh	6,372	100.00%
Total votes		6,372	100.00%

Republican primary results
Party	Candidate	Votes	%
Republican	Toni Hellon	6,055	56.64%
Republican	Scott Alexander	4,636	43.36%
Total votes		10,691	100.00%

General election results
Party	Candidate	Votes	%
Republican	Toni Hellon	36,950	51.57%
Democratic	Mark Osterloh	34,707	48.43%
Total votes		71,657	100.00%
Republican hold			

=== District 13 ===
Democratic primary results
Party	Candidate	Votes	%
Democratic	Andy Nichols	7,787	100.00%
Total votes		7,787	100.00%

Republican primary results
Party	Candidate	Votes	%
Republican	Kathleen Dunbar	7,550	100.00%
Total votes		7,550	100.00%

Libertarian Primary Results
Party	Candidate	Votes	%
Libertarian	Wayne Sunne	98	100.00%
Total votes		98	100.00%

General election results
Party	Candidate	Votes	%
Democratic	Andy Nichols	27,714	50.19%
Republican	Kathleen Dunbar	25,845	46.81%
Libertarian	Wayne Sunne	1,655	3.00%
Total votes		55,214	100.00%
Democratic hold			

=== District 14 ===
Democratic primary results
Party	Candidate	Votes	%
Democratic	Ruth Solomon (incumbent)	5,984	100.00%
Total votes		5,984	100.00%

Libertarian Primary Results
Party	Candidate	Votes	%
Libertarian	Ed Kahn	15	100.00%
Total votes		15	100.00%

General election results
Party	Candidate	Votes	%
Democratic	Ruth Solomon (incumbent)	30,108	76.67%
Libertarian	Ed Kahn	9,161	23.33%
Total votes		39,269	100.00%
Democratic hold			

=== District 15 ===
Republican primary results
Party	Candidate	Votes	%
Republican	Edward J. Cirillo (incumbent)	6,079	39.37%
Republican	Jerry Overton	5,317	34.43%
Republican	Carole Hubbs	4,045	26.20%
Total votes		15,441	100.00%

General election results
Party	Candidate	Votes	%
Republican	Edward J. Cirillo (incumbent)	48,116	100.00%
Total votes		48,116	100.00%
Republican hold			

=== District 16 ===
Democratic primary results
Party	Candidate	Votes	%
Democratic	Mark Winemiller	1,860	100.00%
Total votes		1,860	100.00%

Republican primary results
Party	Candidate	Votes	%
Republican	Darden C. Hamilton (incumbent)	4,089	100.00%
Total votes		4,089	100.00%

General election results
Party	Candidate	Votes	%
Republican	Darden C. Hamilton (incumbent)	20,190	53.77%
Democratic	Mark Winemiller	17,358	46.23%
Total votes		37,548	100.00%
Republican hold			

=== District 17 ===
Democratic primary results
Party	Candidate	Votes	%
Democratic	Leonard Clark	96	100.00%
Total votes		96	100.00%

Republican primary results
Party	Candidate	Votes	%
Republican	Brenda Burns (incumbent)	9,026	100.00%
Total votes		9,026	100.00%

General election results
Party	Candidate	Votes	%
Republican	Brenda Burns (incumbent)	35,635	100.00%
Total votes		35,635	100.00%
Republican hold			

=== District 18 ===
Republican primary results
Party	Candidate	Votes	%
Republican	Susan Gerard	8,719	100.00%
Total votes		8,719	100.00%

General election results
Party	Candidate	Votes	%
Republican	Susan Gerard	32,956	100.00%
Total votes		32,956	100.00%
Republican hold			

=== District 19 ===
Democratic primary results
Party	Candidate	Votes	%
Democratic	Martha Bruneau	3,045	100.00%
Total votes		3,045	100.00%

Republican primary results
Party	Candidate	Votes	%
Republican	Scott Bundgaard (incumbent)	8,491	66.83%
Republican	Debra Raeder	4,214	33.17%
Total votes		12,705	100.00%

Libertarian Primary Results
Party	Candidate	Votes	%
Libertarian	Clay Adair	9	100.00%
Total votes		9	100.00%

General election results
Party	Candidate	Votes	%
Republican	Scott Bundgaard (incumbent)	41,814	59.68%
Democratic	Martha Bruneau	25,920	36.99%
Libertarian	Clay Adair	2,335	3.33%
Total votes		70,069	100.00%
Republican hold			

=== District 20 ===
Democratic primary results
Party	Candidate	Votes	%
Democratic	Mary Hartley (incumbent)	1,989	100.00%
Total votes		1,989	100.00%

Republican primary results
Party	Candidate	Votes	%
Republican	Craig Savage	1,891	100.00%
Total votes		1,891	100.00%

General election results
Party	Candidate	Votes	%
Democratic	Mary Hartley (incumbent)	13,835	61.93%
Republican	Craig Savage	8,503	38.07%
Total votes		22,338	100.00%
Democratic hold			

=== District 21 ===
Democratic primary results
Party	Candidate	Votes	%
Democratic	Paul Cash	3,634	100.00%
Total votes		3,634	100.00%

Republican primary results
Party	Candidate	Votes	%
Republican	Russell "Rusty" Bowers (incumbent)	11,209	100.00%
Total votes		11,209	100.00%

General election results
Party	Candidate	Votes	%
Republican	Russell "Rusty" Bowers (incumbent)	31,700	56.09%
Democratic	Paul Cash	24,819	43.91%
Total votes		56,519	100.00%
Republican hold			

=== District 22 ===
Democratic primary results
Party	Candidate	Votes	%
Democratic	Joe Eddie Lopez (incumbent)	2,010	100.00%
Total votes		2,010	100.00%

General election results
Party	Candidate	Votes	%
Democratic	Joe Eddie Lopez (incumbent)	12,618	100.00%
Total votes		12,618	100.00%
Democratic hold			

=== District 23 ===
Democratic primary results
Party	Candidate	Votes	%
Democratic	Linda Aguirre (incumbent)	2,250	67.39%
Democratic	Andrew (A. J.) Miller	1,089	32.61%
Total votes		3,339	100.00%

General election results
Party	Candidate	Votes	%
Democratic	Linda Aguirre (incumbent)	13,859	99.94%
Independent	Bradley Cashman (Note: Ran as a write-in candidate in the general election.)	8	0.06%
Total votes		13,867	100.00%
Democratic hold			

=== District 24 ===
Democratic primary results
Party	Candidate	Votes	%
Democratic	Jeff Bollerman	294	100.00%
Total votes		294	100.00%

Republican primary results
Party	Candidate	Votes	%
Republican	Dean Martin	5,465	51.05%
Republican	Tom Horne	5,240	48.95%
Total votes		10,705	100.00%

Libertarian Primary Results
Party	Candidate	Votes	%
Libertarian	Gary Fallon	66	100.00%
Total votes		66	100.00%

General election results
Party	Candidate	Votes	%
Republican	Dean Martin	34,002	58.71%
Democratic	Jeff Bollerman	21,134	36.49%
Libertarian	Gary Fallon	2,781	4.80%
Total votes		57,917	100.00%
Republican hold			

=== District 25 ===
Democratic primary results
Party	Candidate	Votes	%
Democratic	Chris Cummiskey (incumbent)	3,904	100.00%
Total votes		3,904	100.00%

Republican primary results
Party	Candidate	Votes	%
Republican	Pat Kaminsky	4,339	100.00%
Total votes		4,339	100.00%

General election results
Party	Candidate	Votes	%
Democratic	Chris Cummiskey (incumbent)	21,970	66.36%
Republican	Pat Kaminsky	11,135	33.64%
Total votes		33,105	100.00%
Democratic hold			

=== District 26 ===
Democratic primary results
Party	Candidate	Votes	%
Democratic	Ed Ranger	3,272	77.19%
Democratic	Lee Chabala	967	22.81%
Total votes		4,239	100.00%

Republican primary results
Party	Candidate	Votes	%
Republican	Tom Smith (incumbent)	10,005	100.00%
Total votes		10,005	100.00%

General election results
Party	Candidate	Votes	%
Republican	Tom Smith (incumbent)	26,425	56.79%
Democratic	Ed Ranger	20,106	43.21%
Total votes		46,531	100.00%
Republican hold			

=== District 27 ===
Democratic primary results
Party	Candidate	Votes	%
Democratic	Harry E. Mitchell (incumbent)	3,022	100.00%
Total votes		3,022	100.00%

Republican primary results
Party	Candidate	Votes	%
Republican	Gary Richardson	8,466	100.00%
Total votes		8,466	100.00%

General election results
Party	Candidate	Votes	%
Democratic	Harry E. Mitchell (incumbent)	26,784	55.54%
Republican	Gary Richardson	21,443	44.46%
Total votes		48,227	100.00%
Democratic hold			

=== District 28 ===
Republican primary results
Party	Candidate	Votes	%
Republican	Randall Gnant (incumbent)	10,294	52.61%
Republican	David Smith	9,272	47.39%
Total votes		19,566	100.00%

Libertarian Primary Results
Party	Candidate	Votes	%
Libertarian	Mark Horning	7	100.00%
Total votes		7	100.00%

General election results
Party	Candidate	Votes	%
Republican	Randall Gnant (incumbent)	68,664	82.54%
Libertarian	Mark Horning	14,524	17.46%
Total votes		83,188	100.00%
Republican hold			

=== District 29 ===
Democratic primary results
Party	Candidate	Votes	%
Democratic	Ernie R. Jaurigui	1,784	100.00%
Total votes		1,784	100.00%

Republican primary results
Party	Candidate	Votes	%
Republican	David Petersen (incumbent)	7,543	100.00%
Total votes		7,543	100.00%

General election results
Party	Candidate	Votes	%
Republican	David Petersen (incumbent)	18,266	63.39%
Democratic	Ernie R. Jaurigui	10,549	36.61%
Total votes		28,815	100.00%
Republican hold			

=== District 30 ===
Democratic primary results
Party	Candidate	Votes	%
Democratic	Jay Blanchard	3,675	100.00%
Total votes		3,675	100.00%

Republican primary results
Party	Candidate	Votes	%
Republican	Jeff Groscost	11,224	71.03%
Republican	Ronald Bellus	4,577	28.97%
Total votes		15,801	100.00%

General election results
Party	Candidate	Votes	%
Democratic	Jay Blanchard	51,965	66.39%
Republican	Jeff Groscost	26,303	33.61%
Total votes		78,268	100.00%
Democratic gain from Republican			
