= 2004 Arizona Senate election =

- November 2, 2004

All 30 seats of the Arizona Senate 16 seats needed for a majority
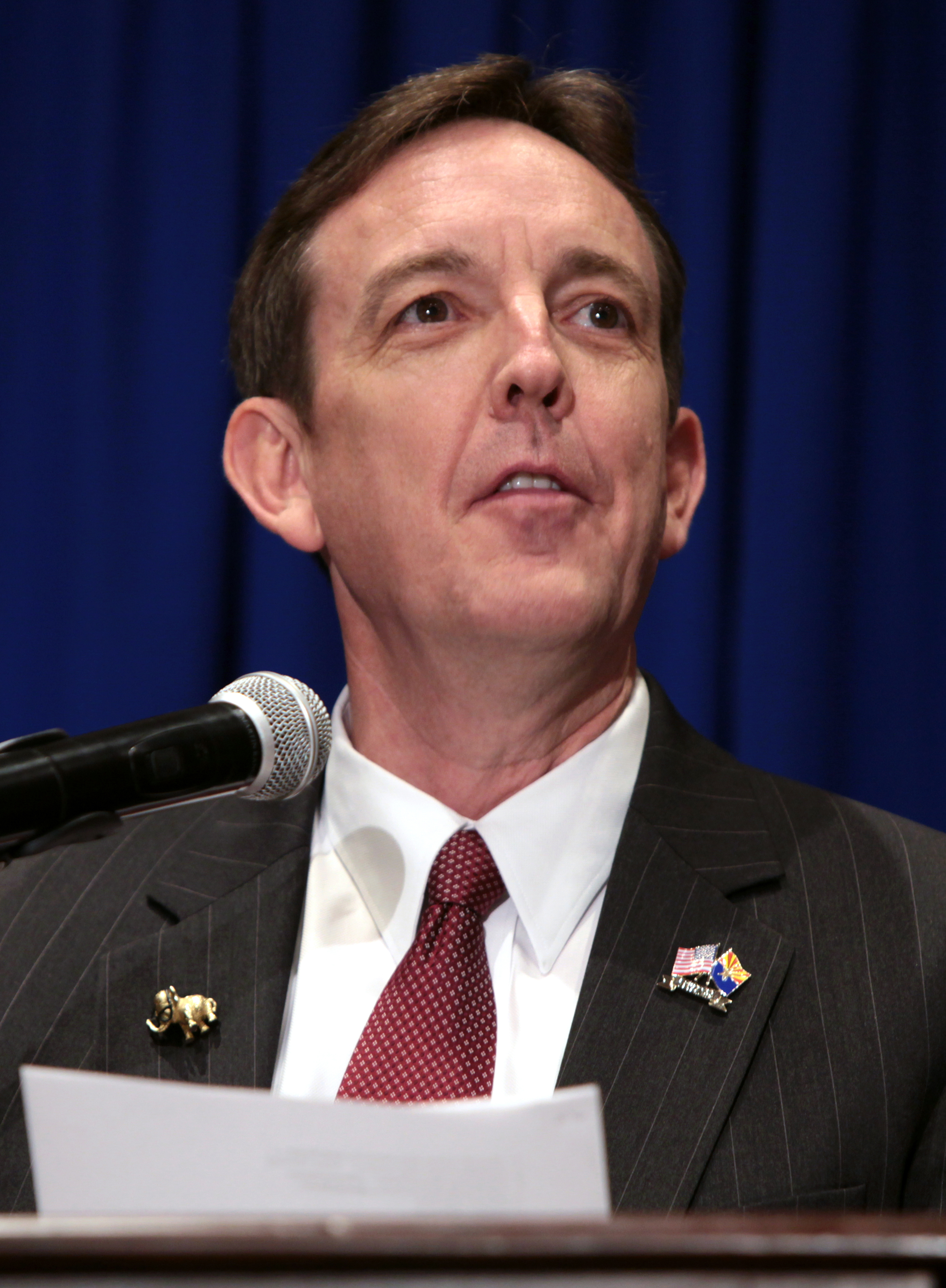

| | Majority party | Minority party |
|---|---|---|
| Leader | Ken Bennett | Linda Aguirre |
| Party | Republican | Democratic |
| Leader's seat | 1st | 16th |
| Seats before | 17 | 13 |
| Seats after | 18 | 12 |
| Seat change | ▲1 | ▼1 |
- Results: Democratic hold Republican hold Republican gain
Senate President before election
Ken Bennett
Republican
Elected Senate President
Ken Bennett
Republican

The 2004 Arizona Senate election was held on November 2, 2004. Voters elected members of the Arizona Senate in all 30 of the state's legislative districts to serve a two-year term. Primary elections were held on September 7, 2004.

Prior to the elections, the Republicans held a majority of 17 seats over the Democrats' 13 seats.

Following the election, Republicans maintained control of the chamber with 18 Republicans to 12 Democrats, a net gain of one seat for Republicans.

The newly elected senators served in the 47th Arizona State Legislature.

== Retiring Incumbents ==
=== Democrats ===
1. District 5: Jack A. Brown
2. District 23: Pete Rios

=== Republicans ===
1. District 3: Linda Binder
2. District 10: Jim Weiers
3. District 18: Mark Anderson

== Incumbent Defeated in Primary Election ==
=== Republican ===
1. District 20: Slade Mead

== Predictions ==
| Source | Ranking | As of |
|---|---|---|
| Rothenberg | Likely R | October 1, 2004 |

== Summary of Results by Arizona State Legislative District ==
| District | Incumbent | Party | Elected Senator | Outcome |
|---|---|---|---|---|
| 1st | Ken Bennett | Rep | Ken Bennett | Rep Hold |
| 2nd | Albert Hale (Note: Senator Albert Hale was appointed by the Apache County Board of Supervisors to fill the vacancy created when Senator Jack Jackson, Sr. resigned from office effective December 31, 2003.) | Dem | Albert Hale | Dem Hold |
| 3rd | Linda Binder | Rep | Ron Gould | Rep Hold |
| 4th | Jack W. Harper | Rep | Jack W. Harper | Rep Hold |
| 5th | Jack A. Brown | Dem | Jake Flake | Rep Gain |
| 6th | Dean Martin | Rep | Dean Martin | Rep Hold |
| 7th | Jim Waring | Rep | Jim Waring | Rep Hold |
| 8th | Carolyn S. Allen | Rep | Carolyn S. Allen | Rep Hold |
| 9th | Robert "Bob" Burns | Rep | Robert "Bob" Burns | Rep Hold |
| 10th | Jim Weiers | Rep | Linda Gray | Rep Hold |
| 11th | Barbara Leff | Rep | Barbara Leff | Rep Hold |
| 12th | Robert Blendu | Rep | Robert Blendu | Rep Hold |
| 13th | Richard Miranda | Dem | Richard Miranda | Dem Hold |
| 14th | Bill Brotherton | Dem | Bill Brotherton | Dem Hold |
| 15th | Ken Cheuvront | Dem | Ken Cheuvront | Dem Hold |
| 16th | Linda Aguirre | Dem | Linda Aguirre | Dem Hold |
| 17th | Harry Mitchell | Dem | Harry Mitchell | Dem Hold |
| 18th | Mark Anderson | Rep | Karen Johnson | Rep Hold |
| 19th | Marilyn Jarrett | Rep | Marilyn Jarrett | Rep Hold |
| 20th | Slade Mead | Rep | John Huppenthal | Rep Hold |
| 21st | Jay Tibshraeny | Rep | Jay Tibshraeny | Rep Hold |
| 22nd | Thayer Verschoor | Rep | Thayer Verschoor | Rep Hold |
| 23rd | Pete Rios | Dem | Rebecca Rios | Dem Hold |
| 24th | Robert Cannell (Note: Senator Robert C. Cannell was appointed January 24, 2003 by the Yuma County Board of Supervisors to fill the vacancy created in District 24 when Herb Guenther was appointed as Director of the Department of Water Resources and did not take the Oath of Office. Robert C. Cannell was sworn in as Senator on January 27, 2003.) | Dem | Robert Cannell | Dem Hold |
| 25th | Marsha Arzberger | Dem | Marsha Arzberger | Dem Hold |
| 26th | Toni Hellon | Rep | Toni Hellon | Rep Hold |
| 27th | Jorge Luis Garcia | Dem | Jorge Luis Garcia | Dem Hold |
| 28th | Gabrielle Giffords | Dem | Gabrielle Giffords | Dem Hold |
| 29th | Victor Soltero (Note: Senator Victor Soltero was appointed January 28, 2003 by the Pima County Board of Supervisors to fill the vacancy created in District 29 when Ramón Valadez was appointed Special Assistant to the Governor for Southern Arizona and did not take the Oath of Office. Victor Soltero was sworn in as Senator on January 29, 2003.) | Dem | Victor Soltero | Dem Hold |
| 30th | Tim Bee | Rep | Tim Bee | Rep Hold |

== Detailed Results ==
=== District 1 ===
Democratic primary results
| Party | Candidate | Votes | % |
|---|---|---|---|
| Democratic | Susan E. Friedman | 7,214 | 100.00% |
| Total votes | | 7,214 | 100.00% |

Republican primary results
| Party | Candidate | Votes | % |
|---|---|---|---|
| Republican | Ken Bennett (incumbent) | 17,466 | 100.00% |
| Total votes | | 17,466 | 100.00% |

General election results
| Party | Candidate | Votes | % |
|---|---|---|---|
| Republican | Ken Bennett (incumbent) | 50,727 | 59.64% |
| Democratic | Susan E. Friedman | 34,326 | 40.36% |
| Total votes | | 85,053 | 100.00% |
| Republican hold | | | |

=== District 2 ===
Democratic primary results
| Party | Candidate | Votes | % |
|---|---|---|---|
| Democratic | Albert Hale (incumbent) | 15,257 | 100.00% |
| Total votes | | 15,257 | 100.00% |

General election results
| Party | Candidate | Votes | % |
|---|---|---|---|
| Democratic | Albert Hale (incumbent) | 47,591 | 100.00% |
| Total votes | | 47,591 | 100.00% |
| Democratic hold | | | |

=== District 3 ===
Republican primary results
| Party | Candidate | Votes | % |
|---|---|---|---|
| Republican | Ron Gould | 6,956 | 39.82% |
| Republican | Joe Hart | 5,314 | 30.42% |
| Republican | Bill Wagner | 5,199 | 29.76% |
| Total votes | | 17,469 | 100.00% |

General election results
| Party | Candidate | Votes | % |
|---|---|---|---|
| Republican | Ron Gould | 43,646 | 100.00% |
| Total votes | | 43,646 | 100.00% |
| Republican hold | | | |

=== District 4 ===
Republican primary results
| Party | Candidate | Votes | % |
|---|---|---|---|
| Republican | Jack W. Harper (incumbent) | 15,024 | 60.54% |
| Republican | Susan Burke | 9,791 | 39.46% |
| Total votes | | 24,815 | 100.00% |

General election results
| Party | Candidate | Votes | % |
|---|---|---|---|
| Republican | Jack W. Harper (incumbent) | 71,870 | 100.00% |
| Total votes | | 71,870 | 100.00% |
| Republican hold | | | |

=== District 5 ===
Democratic primary results
| Party | Candidate | Votes | % |
|---|---|---|---|
| Democratic | Cameron Udall | 11,945 | 100.00% |
| Total votes | | 11,945 | 100.00% |

Republican primary results
| Party | Candidate | Votes | % |
|---|---|---|---|
| Republican | Jake Flake | 10,604 | 100.00% |
| Total votes | | 10,604 | 100.00% |

General election results
| Party | Candidate | Votes | % |
|---|---|---|---|
| Republican | Jake Flake | 33,767 | 55.10% |
| Democratic | Cameron Udall | 27,516 | 44.90% |
| Total votes | | 61,283 | 100.00% |
| Republican gain from Democratic | | | |

=== District 6 ===
Democratic primary results
| Party | Candidate | Votes | % |
|---|---|---|---|
| Democratic | Marla Wing | 3,521 | 100.00% |
| Total votes | | 3,521 | 100.00% |

Republican primary results
| Party | Candidate | Votes | % |
|---|---|---|---|
| Republican | Dean Martin (incumbent) | 11,441 | 100.00% |
| Total votes | | 11,441 | 100.00% |

General election results
| Party | Candidate | Votes | % |
|---|---|---|---|
| Republican | Dean Martin (incumbent) | 42,025 | 66.05% |
| Democratic | Marla Wing | 21,598 | 33.95% |
| Total votes | | 63,623 | 100.00% |
| Republican hold | | | |

=== District 7 ===
Democratic primary results
| Party | Candidate | Votes | % |
|---|---|---|---|
| Democratic | John B. Vannucci | 3,508 | 100.00% |
| Total votes | | 3,508 | 100.00% |

Republican primary results
| Party | Candidate | Votes | % |
|---|---|---|---|
| Republican | Jim Waring (incumbent) | 12,048 | 100.00% |
| Total votes | | 12,048 | 100.00% |

General election results
| Party | Candidate | Votes | % |
|---|---|---|---|
| Republican | Jim Waring (incumbent) | 46,335 | 67.01% |
| Democratic | John B. Vannucci | 22,814 | 32.99% |
| Total votes | | 69,149 | 100.00% |
| Republican hold | | | |

=== District 8 ===
Democratic primary results
| Party | Candidate | Votes | % |
|---|---|---|---|
| Democratic | Stuart M. Turnansky | 4,132 | 100.00% |
| Total votes | | 4,132 | 100.00% |

Republican primary results
| Party | Candidate | Votes | % |
|---|---|---|---|
| Republican | Carolyn S. Allen (incumbent) | 11,157 | 59.28% |
| Republican | Robert Ditchey | 7,664 | 40.72% |
| Total votes | | 18,821 | 100.00% |

Libertarian Primary Results
| Party | Candidate | Votes | % |
|---|---|---|---|
| Libertarian | Orville Weyrich | 65 | 100.00% |
| Total votes | | 65 | 100.00% |

General election results
| Party | Candidate | Votes | % |
|---|---|---|---|
| Republican | Carolyn S. Allen (incumbent) | 55,578 | 65.52% |
| Democratic | Stuart M. Turnansky | 26,398 | 31.12% |
| Libertarian | Orville Weyrich | 2,845 | 3.35% |
| Total votes | | 84,821 | 100.00% |
| Republican hold | | | |

=== District 9 ===
Democratic primary results
| Party | Candidate | Votes | % |
|---|---|---|---|
| Democratic | Steve Poe | 6,677 | 100.00% |
| Total votes | | 6,677 | 100.00% |

Republican primary results
| Party | Candidate | Votes | % |
|---|---|---|---|
| Republican | Robert "Bob" Burns (incumbent) | 16,324 | 100.00% |
| Total votes | | 16,324 | 100.00% |

General election results
| Party | Candidate | Votes | % |
|---|---|---|---|
| Republican | Robert "Bob" Burns (incumbent) | 40,817 | 59.66% |
| Democratic | Steve Poe | 27,601 | 40.34% |
| Total votes | | 68,418 | 100.00% |
| Republican hold | | | |

=== District 10 ===
Democratic primary results
| Party | Candidate | Votes | % |
|---|---|---|---|
| Democratic | Lydia Guzman | 3,987 | 100.00% |
| Total votes | | 3,987 | 100.00% |

Republican primary results
| Party | Candidate | Votes | % |
|---|---|---|---|
| Republican | Linda Gray | 8,159 | 100.00% |
| Total votes | | 8,159 | 100.00% |

General election results
| Party | Candidate | Votes | % |
|---|---|---|---|
| Republican | Linda Gray | 27,077 | 55.07% |
| Democratic | Lydia Guzman | 22,090 | 44.93% |
| Total votes | | 49,167 | 100.00% |
| Republican hold | | | |

=== District 11 ===
Democratic primary results
| Party | Candidate | Votes | % |
|---|---|---|---|
| Democratic | Seth Apfel | 5,957 | 100.00% |
| Total votes | | 5,957 | 100.00% |

Republican primary results
| Party | Candidate | Votes | % |
|---|---|---|---|
| Republican | Barbara Leff (incumbent) | 14,288 | 100.00% |
| Total votes | | 14,288 | 100.00% |

Libertarian Primary Results
| Party | Candidate | Votes | % |
|---|---|---|---|
| Libertarian | Sean Nottingham | 110 | 100.00% |
| Total votes | | 110 | 100.00% |

General election results
| Party | Candidate | Votes | % |
|---|---|---|---|
| Republican | Barbara Leff (incumbent) | 44,731 | 57.99% |
| Democratic | Seth Apfel | 28,364 | 36.77% |
| Libertarian | Sean Nottingham | 4,042 | 5.24% |
| Total votes | | 77,137 | 100.00% |
| Republican hold | | | |

=== District 12 ===
Democratic primary results
| Party | Candidate | Votes | % |
|---|---|---|---|
| Democratic | Kathi Foster | 5,035 | 100.00% |
| Total votes | | 5,035 | 100.00% |

Republican primary results
| Party | Candidate | Votes | % |
|---|---|---|---|
| Republican | Robert Blendu (incumbent) | 10,635 | 100.00% |
| Total votes | | 10,635 | 100.00% |

General election results
| Party | Candidate | Votes | % |
|---|---|---|---|
| Republican | Robert Blendu (incumbent) | 37,397 | 54.12% |
| Democratic | Kathi Foster | 31,700 | 45.88% |
| Total votes | | 69,097 | 100.00% |
| Republican hold | | | |

=== District 13 ===
Democratic primary results
| Party | Candidate | Votes | % |
|---|---|---|---|
| Democratic | Richard Miranda (incumbent) | 3,426 | 100.00% |
| Total votes | | 3,426 | 100.00% |

General election results
| Party | Candidate | Votes | % |
|---|---|---|---|
| Democratic | Richard Miranda (incumbent) | 20,417 | 100.00% |
| Total votes | | 20,417 | 100.00% |
| Democratic hold | | | |

=== District 14 ===
Democratic primary results
| Party | Candidate | Votes | % |
|---|---|---|---|
| Democratic | Bill Brotherton (incumbent) | 2,571 | 100.00% |
| Total votes | | 2,571 | 100.00% |

General election results
| Party | Candidate | Votes | % |
|---|---|---|---|
| Democratic | Bill Brotherton (incumbent) | 15,437 | 100.00% |
| Total votes | | 15,437 | 100.00% |
| Democratic hold | | | |

=== District 15 ===
Democratic primary results
| Party | Candidate | Votes | % |
|---|---|---|---|
| Democratic | Ken Cheuvront (incumbent) | 5,490 | 100.00% |
| Total votes | | 5,490 | 100.00% |

Republican primary results
| Party | Candidate | Votes | % |
|---|---|---|---|
| Republican | Andrew Smigielski | 4,109 | 100.00% |
| Total votes | | 4,109 | 100.00% |

General election results
| Party | Candidate | Votes | % |
|---|---|---|---|
| Democratic | Ken Cheuvront (incumbent) | 24,436 | 65.07% |
| Republican | Andrew Smigielski | 13,114 | 34.92% |
| Independent | Bradley Cashman (Note: Was a write-in candidate in the general election.) | 4 | 0.01% |
| Total votes | | 37,554 | 100.00% |
| Democratic hold | | | |

=== District 16 ===
Democratic primary results
| Party | Candidate | Votes | % |
|---|---|---|---|
| Democratic | Linda Aguirre (incumbent) | 4,404 | 100.00% |
| Total votes | | 4,404 | 100.00% |

General election results
| Party | Candidate | Votes | % |
|---|---|---|---|
| Democratic | Linda Aguirre (incumbent) | 26,078 | 100.00% |
| Total votes | | 26,078 | 100.00% |
| Democratic hold | | | |

=== District 17 ===
Democratic primary results
| Party | Candidate | Votes | % |
|---|---|---|---|
| Democratic | Harry Mitchell (incumbent) | 5,390 | 100.00% |
| Total votes | | 5,390 | 100.00% |

Republican primary results
| Party | Candidate | Votes | % |
|---|---|---|---|
| Republican | Jesse J. Hernandez | 7,483 | 100.00% |
| Total votes | | 7,483 | 100.00% |

General election results
| Party | Candidate | Votes | % |
|---|---|---|---|
| Democratic | Harry Mitchell (incumbent) | 35,541 | 61.14% |
| Republican | Jesse J. Hernandez | 22,588 | 38.86% |
| Total votes | | 58,129 | 100.00% |
| Democratic hold | | | |

=== District 18 ===
Republican primary results
| Party | Candidate | Votes | % |
|---|---|---|---|
| Republican | Karen Johnson | 6,159 | 53.12% |
| Republican | Mary Jo Vecchiarelli | 5,435 | 46.88% |
| Total votes | | 11,594 | 100.00% |

General election results
| Party | Candidate | Votes | % |
|---|---|---|---|
| Republican | Karen Johnson | 32,732 | 100.00% |
| Total votes | | 32,732 | 100.00% |
| Republican hold | | | |

=== District 19 ===
Republican primary results
| Party | Candidate | Votes | % |
|---|---|---|---|
| Republican | Marilyn Jarrett (incumbent) | 14,314 | 100.00% |
| Total votes | | 14,314 | 100.00% |

General election results
| Party | Candidate | Votes | % |
|---|---|---|---|
| Republican | Marilyn Jarrett (incumbent) | 55,630 | 100.00% |
| Total votes | | 55,630 | 100.00% |
| Republican hold | | | |

=== District 20 ===
Republican primary results
| Party | Candidate | Votes | % |
|---|---|---|---|
| Republican | John Huppenthal | 9,734 | 60.07% |
| Republican | Slade Mead (incumbent) | 6,471 | 39.93% |
| Total votes | | 16,205 | 100.00% |

Libertarian Primary Results
| Party | Candidate | Votes | % |
|---|---|---|---|
| Libertarian | Warren Severin (Note: Was a write-in candidate in the primary election.) | 20 | 100.00% |
| Total votes | | 20 | 100.00% |

General election results
| Party | Candidate | Votes | % |
|---|---|---|---|
| Republican | John Huppenthal | 49,770 | 75.77% |
| Libertarian | Warren Severin | 15,917 | 24.23% |
| Total votes | | 65,687 | 100.00% |
| Republican hold | | | |

=== District 21 ===
Republican primary results
| Party | Candidate | Votes | % |
|---|---|---|---|
| Republican | Jay Tibshraeny (incumbent) | 13,342 | 100.00% |
| Total votes | | 13,342 | 100.00% |

General election results
| Party | Candidate | Votes | % |
|---|---|---|---|
| Republican | Jay Tibshraeny (incumbent) | 62,607 | 100.00% |
| Total votes | | 62,607 | 100.00% |
| Republican hold | | | |

=== District 22 ===
Republican primary results
| Party | Candidate | Votes | % |
|---|---|---|---|
| Republican | Thayer Verschoor (incumbent) | 14,016 | 100.00% |
| Total votes | | 14,016 | 100.00% |

General election results
| Party | Candidate | Votes | % |
|---|---|---|---|
| Republican | Thayer Verschoor (incumbent) | 67,677 | 100.00% |
| Total votes | | 67,677 | 100.00% |
| Republican hold | | | |

=== District 23 ===
Democratic primary results
| Party | Candidate | Votes | % |
|---|---|---|---|
| Democratic | Rebecca Rios | 5,362 | 54.45% |
| Democratic | Robert "Bob" Mitchell | 4,485 | 45.55% |
| Total votes | | 9,847 | 100.00% |

General election results
| Party | Candidate | Votes | % |
|---|---|---|---|
| Democratic | Rebecca Rios | 34,592 | 100.00% |
| Total votes | | 34,592 | 100.00% |
| Democratic hold | | | |

=== District 24 ===
Democratic primary results
| Party | Candidate | Votes | % |
|---|---|---|---|
| Democratic | Robert Cannell (incumbent) | 7,098 | 100.00% |
| Total votes | | 7,098 | 100.00% |

Libertarian Primary Results
| Party | Candidate | Votes | % |
|---|---|---|---|
| Libertarian | Rodney Martin | 85 | 100.00% |
| Total votes | | 85 | 100.00% |

General election results
| Party | Candidate | Votes | % |
|---|---|---|---|
| Democratic | Robert Cannell (incumbent) | 28,785 | 82.86% |
| Libertarian | Rodney Martin | 5,955 | 17.14% |
| Total votes | | 34,740 | 100.00% |
| Democratic hold | | | |

=== District 25 ===
Democratic primary results
| Party | Candidate | Votes | % |
|---|---|---|---|
| Democratic | Marsha Arzberger (incumbent) | 10,505 | 100.00% |
| Total votes | | 10,505 | 100.00% |

Republican primary results
| Party | Candidate | Votes | % |
|---|---|---|---|
| Republican | L. E. (Les) Thompson | 8,368 | 100.00% |
| Total votes | | 8,368 | 100.00% |

General election results
| Party | Candidate | Votes | % |
|---|---|---|---|
| Democratic | Marsha Arzberger (incumbent) | 31,514 | 56.08% |
| Republican | L. E. (Les) Thompson | 24,680 | 43.92% |
| Total votes | | 56,194 | 100.00% |
| Democratic hold | | | |

=== District 26 ===
Republican primary results
| Party | Candidate | Votes | % |
|---|---|---|---|
| Republican | Toni Hellon (incumbent) | 15,093 | 100.00% |
| Total votes | | 15,093 | 100.00% |

General election results
| Party | Candidate | Votes | % |
|---|---|---|---|
| Republican | Toni Hellon (incumbent) | 64,303 | 100.00% |
| Total votes | | 64,303 | 100.00% |
| Republican hold | | | |

=== District 27 ===
Democratic primary results
| Party | Candidate | Votes | % |
|---|---|---|---|
| Democratic | Jorge Luis Garcia (incumbent) | 4,307 | 56.26% |
| Democratic | Jesús Romo | 3,349 | 43.74% |
| Total votes | | 7,656 | 100.00% |

General election results
| Party | Candidate | Votes | % |
|---|---|---|---|
| Democratic | Jorge Luis Garcia (incumbent) | 43,532 | 100.00% |
| Total votes | | 43,532 | 100.00% |
| Democratic hold | | | |

=== District 28 ===
Democratic primary results
| Party | Candidate | Votes | % |
|---|---|---|---|
| Democratic | Gabrielle Giffords (incumbent) | 9,754 | 100.00% |
| Total votes | | 9,754 | 100.00% |

Republican primary results
| Party | Candidate | Votes | % |
|---|---|---|---|
| Republican | Charles H. (Chuck) Josephson | 8,064 | 100.00% |
| Total votes | | 8,064 | 100.00% |

Libertarian Primary Results
| Party | Candidate | Votes | % |
|---|---|---|---|
| Libertarian | Mick Chvala | 123 | 100.00% |
| Total votes | | 123 | 100.00% |

General election results
| Party | Candidate | Votes | % |
|---|---|---|---|
| Democratic | Gabrielle Giffords (incumbent) | 43,911 | 64.15% |
| Republican | Charles H. (Chuck) Josephson | 22,254 | 32.51% |
| Libertarian | Mick Chvala | 2,289 | 3.34% |
| Total votes | | 68,454 | 100.00% |
| Democratic hold | | | |

=== District 29 ===
Democratic primary results
| Party | Candidate | Votes | % |
|---|---|---|---|
| Democratic | Victor Soltero (incumbent) | 5,590 | 100.00% |
| Total votes | | 5,590 | 100.00% |

Republican primary results
| Party | Candidate | Votes | % |
|---|---|---|---|
| Republican | Bruce P. Murchison | 4,067 | 100.00% |
| Total votes | | 4,067 | 100.00% |

General election results
| Party | Candidate | Votes | % |
|---|---|---|---|
| Democratic | Victor Soltero (incumbent) | 26,414 | 62.52% |
| Republican | Bruce P. Murchison | 15,833 | 37.48% |
| Total votes | | 42,247 | 100.00% |
| Democratic hold | | | |

=== District 30 ===
Republican primary results
| Party | Candidate | Votes | % |
|---|---|---|---|
| Republican | Tim Bee (incumbent) | 19,111 | 100.00% |
| Total votes | | 19,111 | 100.00% |

General election results
| Party | Candidate | Votes | % |
|---|---|---|---|
| Republican | Tim Bee (incumbent) | 71,018 | 100.00% |
| Total votes | | 71,018 | 100.00% |
| Republican hold | | | |
