= Gabby Giffords =

American politician and gun control activist (born 1970)

- Giffords in 2026

Member of the U.S. House of Representatives from Arizona's 8th district
- In office January 3, 2007 – January 25, 2012
- Preceded by: Jim Kolbe
- Succeeded by: Ron Barber

Member of the Arizona Senate from the 28th district
- In office January 8, 2003 – December 1, 2005
- Preceded by: Randall Gnant
- Succeeded by: Paula Aboud

Member of the Arizona House of Representatives from the 13th district
- In office January 1, 2001 – January 8, 2003
- Preceded by: Andy Nichols
- Succeeded by: Steve Gallardo

Personal details
- Born: Gabrielle Dee Giffords; June 8, 1970 (age 56) Tucson, Arizona, U.S.
- Party: Democratic
- Spouse: Mark Kelly (m. 2007)
- Relatives: Gwyneth Paltrow (second cousin); Jake Paltrow (second cousin); Scott Kelly (brother-in-law)
- Education: Scripps College (BA); Cornell University (MRP)
- Awards: Presidential Medal of Freedom (2022)
- Giffords's voice Giffords honoring the work of the Arizona HIDTA task force. Recorded April 21, 2010

Gabrielle Dee Giffords (born June 8, 1970) is an American retired politician and activist. She served as a member of the United States House of Representatives representing Arizona's 8th congressional district from January 2007 until January 2012, when she resigned due to a severe brain injury suffered during an assassination attempt. A member of the Democratic Party, she was the third woman in Arizona's history to be elected to the U.S. Congress.

Born and raised in Tucson, Arizona, Giffords graduated from Scripps College and Cornell University. After initially moving to New York City, where she worked in regional economic development for Price Waterhouse, she returned to Arizona to work as the CEO of El Campo Tire Warehouses, a family business started by her grandfather. She served in the Arizona House of Representatives from 2001 until 2003 and the Arizona Senate from 2003 until 2005 when she was elected to the U.S. House.

Giffords had just begun her third Congressional term in January 2011 when she was shot in the head in an assassination attempt and mass shooting near Tucson during an event with constituents. Giffords has since recovered much of her ability to walk, speak, read, and write. She was greeted by a standing ovation upon her return to the House floor in August 2011. She attended President Obama's State of the Union address on January 24, 2012, and appeared on the floor of the House the following day, at which time she formally submitted her resignation, receiving a standing ovation and accolades from her colleagues and the leadership of the House.

A moderate in Congress, Giffords has devoted her post-Congressional life to advocating for gun violence prevention and gun safety laws. In January 2013, she and her husband launched Americans for Responsible Solutions, a non-profit organization and super-PAC that later merged with the Law Center to Prevent Gun Violence to become the organization known as Giffords Law Center to Prevent Gun Violence. She is married to former Space Shuttle Commander Mark Kelly, who is the senior senator from Arizona.

== Early life and education ==
Gabrielle Dee Giffords was born on June 8, 1970, and grew up in Tucson, Arizona; her parents were Gloria Kay (née Fraser) and Spencer J. Giffords. She was raised in a mixed religious environment, as her mother was a Christian Scientist and her father was Jewish. Her paternal grandfather, Akiba Hornstein, was a Jewish emigrant from Lithuania who changed his name to Giffords to avoid anti-Semitism in the United States. Through her father, Giffords is a second cousin of actress Gwyneth Paltrow and director Jake Paltrow.

Giffords graduated from Tucson's University High School. She is a former Girl Scout. She received a Bachelor of Arts degree in Sociology and Latin American History from Scripps College in California in 1993; and spent a year as a Fulbright Scholar in Chihuahua, Mexico. She returned to graduate school, earning a Master's degree in Regional Planning from Cornell University in 1996. She focused her studies on Mexican-American relations.

Giffords worked as an associate for regional economic development at Price Waterhouse in New York City. In 1996, she became president and CEO of El Campo Tire Warehouses, a local chain of auto service centers founded by her grandfather. The business was sold to Compañia Goodyear Del Peru in 2000. At the time of the sale, she commented on the difficulties local businesses face when competing against large national firms.

Since 2001, she has practiced Judaism exclusively and belongs to Congregation Chaverim, a Reform synagogue, in Tucson. In 2021, Giffords celebrated her bat mitzvah at the Chaverim, concluding a process two decades in the making.

== Arizona legislature ==
=== Elections ===
Giffords switched her party affiliation from Republican to Democratic in 2000 and was elected to the Arizona House of Representatives in 2001. She was elected to the Arizona Senate in the fall of 2002, at the time the youngest woman elected to that body. She took office in January 2003 and was re-elected in 2004. She resigned from the Arizona Senate on December 1, 2005, in preparation for her congressional campaign.

=== Tenure ===
In early 2005, Giffords observed that "the 2004 election took its toll on our bipartisan coalition" and that as a result "a number of significant problems will receive far less attention than they deserve." She highlighted among these, the lack of high-paying jobs or necessary infrastructure, rapid growth, and inward migration that threatened the environment and "strain[ed] ... education, health care, and transportation", and unresolved problems such as Students First; Arnold v. Sarn; repayments due under Ladewig v. Arizona; the No Child Left Behind mandate; low educational achievement; health care costs; and the demands of the Arizona Health Care Cost Containment System. She said that Arizona was not alone in facing such challenges.

Expanding health care access was an issue pursued by Giffords while she served in the state legislature. She also pushed for bills related to mental health and was named by the Mental Health Association of Arizona as the 2004 Legislator of the Year. Giffords earned the Sierra Club's Most Valuable Player award.

In the legislature, Giffords worked on the bipartisan Children's Caucus, which sought to improve education and health care for Arizona's children. Critics of this plan argued that it amounted to taxpayer-funded daycare. She worked with Arizona Governor Janet Napolitano to promote all-day kindergarten. Giffords supported raising more money for schools "through sponsorship of supplemental state aid through bonds and tax credits that could be used for school supplies." She was awarded Arizona Family Literacy's Outstanding Legislator for 2003.

== U.S. House of Representatives ==
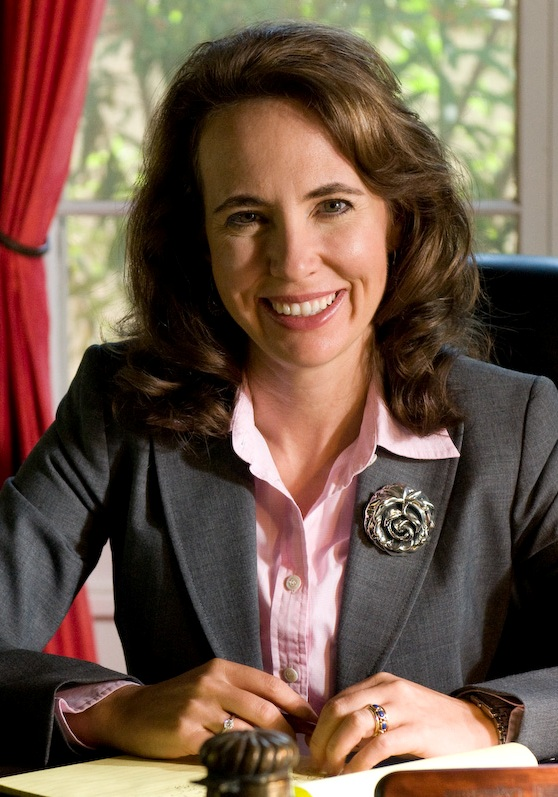
Giffords in 2008

=== Elections ===
2006

Giffords launched her first candidacy for Arizona's 8th congressional district in the U.S. Congress on January 24, 2006. The campaign received national attention early on as the seat was considered a likely pick-up for the Democratic Party. Prominent Democrats, including Tom Daschle, Robert Reich, Janet Napolitano, and Bill Clinton, endorsed her. EMILY's List endorsed Giffords early in the campaign cycle. The Sierra Club and the Arizona Education Association also endorsed her. On September 12, 2006, Giffords won her party's nomination in the primary election.

Her Republican opponent in the general election was Randy Graf, a conservative former state senator known for his enforcement-only position on immigration. Graf had run against Jim Kolbe in the 2004 GOP primary and had announced his candidacy in 2006 before Kolbe announced his retirement. The Republican establishment was somewhat cool toward Graf, believing he might be too conservative for the district. The national GOP took the unusual step of endorsing one of the more moderate candidates in the primary. Graf won anyway, helped by a split in the Republican moderate vote between two candidates.

Not long after the primary, Congressional Quarterly changed its rating of the race to "Leans Democrat." By late September, the national GOP had pulled most of its funding, effectively conceding the seat to Giffords. Giffords won the race on November 7, 2006, with 54 percent of the vote. Graf received 42 percent. The rest of the vote went to minor candidates. Giffords's victory was portrayed as evidence that Americans are accepting towards comprehensive immigration reform. She was the first Jewish woman elected to Congress from Arizona.

2008

In 2008, Giffords was elected to a second term. Republican Tim Bee, a childhood classmate and former colleague in the Arizona State Senate, ran against her. Bee was the president of the Arizona State Senate and considered a strong challenger in the race. Despite native son John McCain's running as the Republican presidential candidate that year, Democrat Giffords was reelected with 56.20 percent of the vote to Bee's 41.45 percent.

2010

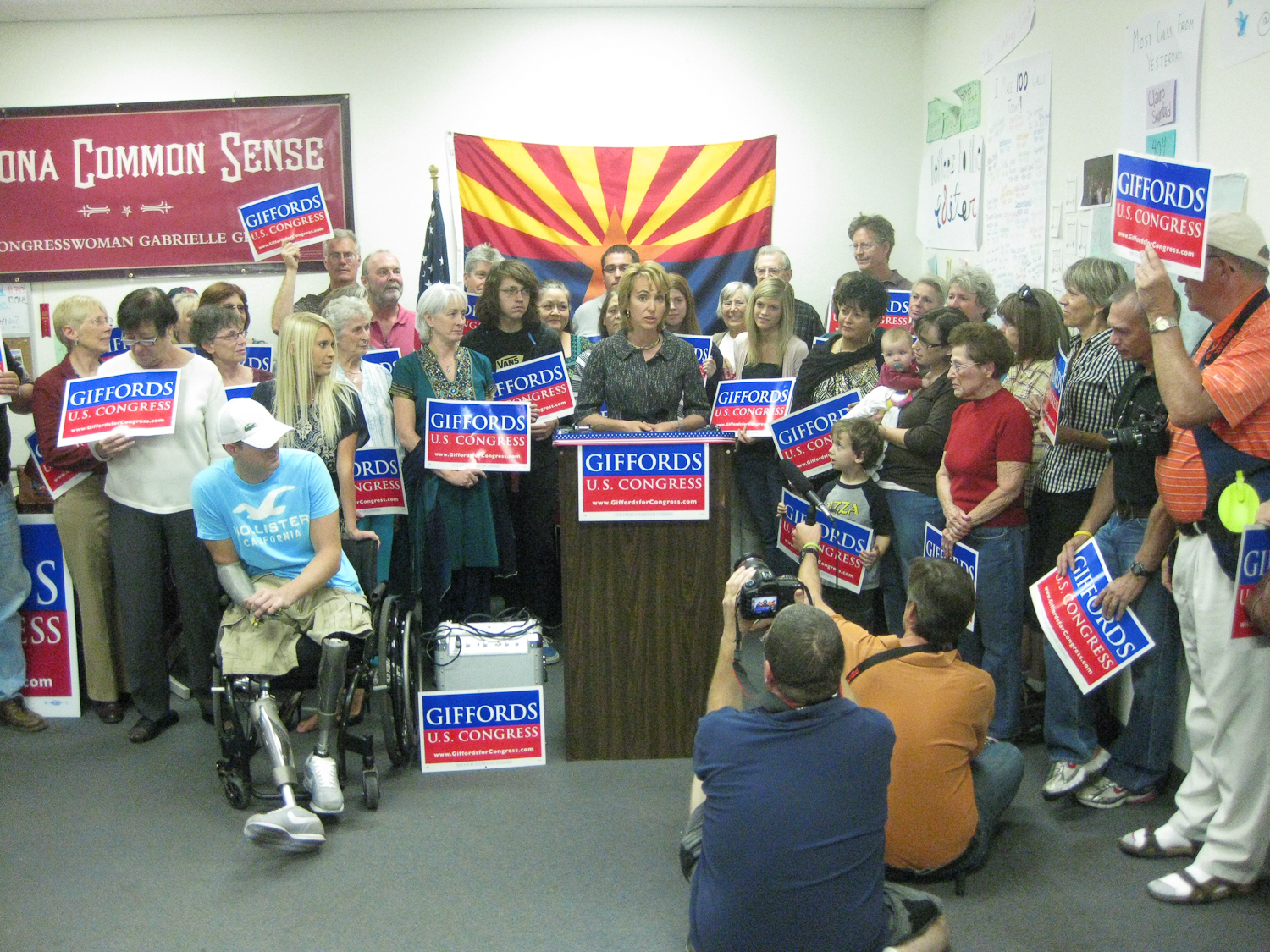
Giffords during a press conference following her 2010 election victory

On November 5, 2010, Giffords was declared the victor after a close race against Republican Jesse Kelly. Kelly, an Iraq War veteran (no relation to Mark Kelly), was listed as a top-ten Tea Party candidate to watch by Politico, and described by The Arizona Republic as highly conservative even compared to Sarah Palin. Giffords had been targeted for defeat by Sarah Palin's political action committee, SarahPAC.

Giffords participated in the reading of the United States Constitution on the floor of the House of Representatives on January 6, 2011; she read the First Amendment.

=== Tenure ===
Following the November 2006 election, Giffords was sworn in as a congresswoman on January 3, 2007. She was the third woman in Arizona's history to be elected to serve in the U.S. Congress. In her inaugural speech on the floor of the House of Representatives, Giffords advocated a comprehensive immigration reform package, including modern technology to secure the border, more border patrol agents, tough employer sanctions for businesses that knowingly hire undocumented immigrants, and a guest-worker program. In her first month in office, Giffords voted in favor of increased federal funding for embryonic stem-cell research; raising the minimum wage; endorsing the 9/11 Commission recommendations; new rules for the House of Representatives targeting ethical issues; and the repeal of $14 billion of subsidies to big oil companies, in favor of renewable energy subsidies and the founding of the Strategic Renewable Energy Reserve.

During the 2007 session of Congress, Giffords introduced a bill (H.R. 1441) to forbid the sale of F-14 aircraft parts on the open market to prevent them from being acquired by Iran. Giffords advocated for a national day of recognition for cowboys as one of her first actions. She voted for the contentious May 2007 Iraq Emergency Supplemental Spending bill, saying, "I cannot, in good conscience, allow the military to run out of money while American servicemen and women are being attacked every day".

In the 2011 Speaker of the United States House of Representatives election, Giffords was one of 18 Democrats to cast their vote for someone other than Nancy Pelosi (the leader of the House Democratic Caucus). Giffords cast her vote for Congressman John Lewis. Arizona's two other Democratic House members voted for Pelosi. Giffords's spokesperson characterized her vote for Lewis, "signal[ing] her desire for courageous leadership and high moral standards at a critical time in our nation's history," citing Lewis as being, "one of our nation's most prominent civil rights leaders and a hero to all Americans."

Giffords was a member of the Blue Dog Coalition and the New Democrat Coalition. She was a co-founder of the Congressional Motorcycle Safety Caucus. Until her husband's retirement, she was the only member of the U.S. Congress whose spouse was an active duty member of the U.S. military. She is also known as a strong proponent of solar energy as well as for her work to secure the Mexico–United States border.

=== Committee assignments ===
- Committee on Armed Services
  - Subcommittee on Tactical Air and Land Forces
  - Subcommittee on Readiness
- Committee on Science, Space and Technology
  - Subcommittee on Space and Aeronautics (Ranking Member)
  - Subcommittee on Technology and Innovation

== Attempted assassination ==
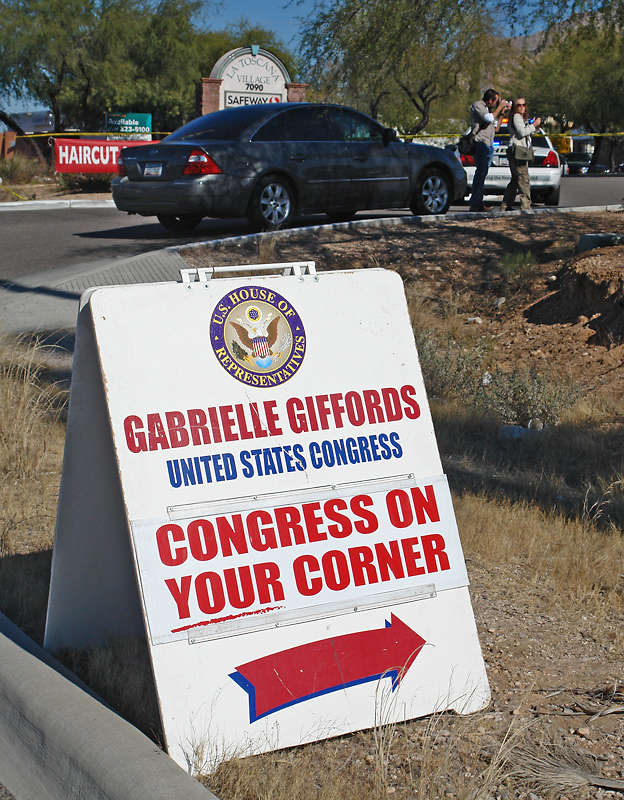
Roadside sign at the scene of the shooting

On January 8, 2011, Giffords was shot in the head outside a Safeway grocery store in Casas Adobes, Arizona, a suburban area northwest of Tucson, during her first "Congress on Your Corner" (a public opportunity for constituents to speak directly with their representatives) gathering of the year. A man ran up to the crowd and began firing a 9mm pistol with a 33-round magazine. The gunman hit 19 people with gunfire, killing six. Among the dead were federal judge John Roll and 9-year-old Christina-Taylor Green, the granddaughter of the major league baseball manager and GM Dallas Green. A twentieth person was injured at the scene, but not by gunfire.

The shooter, Jared Lee Loughner, was detained by bystanders until he was taken into police custody. Federal officials charged Loughner on the next day with killing federal government employees, attempting to assassinate a member of Congress, and attempting to kill federal employees. After eventually facing more than 50 federal criminal charges, Loughner pleaded guilty to 19 of them in a plea bargain to avoid a death sentence.

Giffords's intern, Daniel Hernández Jr., provided first-aid assistance to her immediately after she was wounded, and is credited with saving her life. She was quickly evacuated to the University Medical Center of Tucson in critical condition, though she was still conscious and "following commands."

On the same day, doctors performed emergency surgery to extract skull fragments and a small amount of necrotic tissue from her brain. The bullet passed through Giffords's head without crossing the midline of the brain, where the most critical injuries typically result. Part of her skull was removed to avert further damage to the brain from pressure caused by swelling. Doctors who first treated Giffords said the bullet entered the back of her head and exited through the front of her skull, but physicians later concluded that it had traveled in the opposite direction.

Upon receiving a call from a staffer about Giffords's injury, her husband, Mark Kelly, and his daughters flew in a friend's aircraft directly from Houston to Tucson.

=== Recovery ===
Giffords was initially placed in an induced coma to allow her brain to rest. She was able to respond to simple commands when periodically awakened, but was unable to speak as she was on a ventilator. Nancy Pelosi (the House minority leader) shared that Giffords's husband, Mark Kelly, had acknowledged that there was a "rough road ahead" in her recovery, but that he was encouraged by her responsiveness, including her ability to signal with her hand and move both arms. U.S. Army Col. Geoffrey Ling, a neurologist at the Uniformed Services University in Bethesda, Maryland, was sent to Tucson to consult on Giffords's condition. Ling stated, "Her prognosis for maintaining the function that she has is very good. It's over 50 percent." On January 11, neurosurgeon G. Michael Lemole Jr. said that Giffords's sedation had been reduced and that she could breathe on her own. On January 12, President Barack Obama visited Giffords at the medical center and publicly stated in an evening memorial ceremony for the victims of the shooting that Giffords had "opened her eyes for the first time" that day. Shortly after the shootings, some questions were raised by the media as to whether Giffords could be removed from office under a state law that allows a public office to be declared vacant if the officeholder is absent for three months, but a spokesperson for the Arizona secretary of state said the statute "doesn't apply to federal offices" and was, therefore, not relevant.

As Giffords's status improved, by mid-January she began simple physical therapy, including sitting up with the assistance of hospital staff and moving her legs upon command. On January 15, surgeons performed a tracheotomy, replacing the ventilator tube with a smaller one inserted through Giffords's throat to assist independent breathing. Lynn Polonski, an ophthalmologist, surgically repaired Giffords's damaged eye socket, with additional reconstructive surgery to follow. Giffords's condition improved from "critical" to "serious" on January 17, and to "good" on January 25. She was transferred on January 21 to the Memorial Hermann Medical Center in Houston, Texas, where she subsequently moved to the TIRR Memorial Hermann to undergo a program of physical therapy, occupational therapy and speech therapy. Medical experts' initial assessment in January was that Giffords's recovery could take from several months to more than one year. Upon her arrival in Houston, her doctors were optimistic, saying she had "great rehabilitation potential".

On March 12, 2011, Giffords's husband informed her that six people had been killed in the attack on her, but he did not identify who they were until months later. In late April, Giffords's doctors reported that her physical, cognitive, and language production abilities had improved significantly, placing her in the top 5 percent of patients recovering from similar injuries. She was walking under supervision with perfect control of her left arm and leg, and able to write with her left hand. She was able to read and understand, and spoke in short phrases. With longer efforts, she was able to produce more complex sentences.

From early in her recovery, Giffords's husband had expressed confidence that she would be able to travel to the Kennedy Space Center, Florida, to witness the launch of his final Space Shuttle mission, STS-134, which was scheduled for April 2011. On April 25, Giffords's doctors cleared her for travel to Florida for the launch, scheduled for April 29. She went to Florida to watch from a private family area with no public appearance or photography. The launch of STS-134 was delayed by mechanical problems, and Giffords and Kelly returned to Houston after meeting with President Obama, who had also planned to see the launch with his family at Kennedy Space Center (KSC).

After continuing her rehabilitation therapy in Houston, Giffords returned to KSC for her husband's launch on May 16, 2011. Kelly wore his wife's wedding ring into space, which she had exchanged for his.

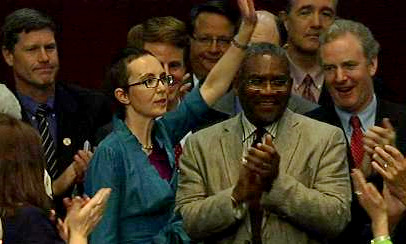
August 1, 2011: Giffords's first appearance in the House of Representatives since her attempted assassination

Giffords underwent cranioplasty surgery on May 18, 2011, to replace the part of her skull that had been removed in January to permit her brain to swell after the gunshot to her head. Surgeons replaced the bone with a piece of molded hard plastic, fixed with tiny screws. They expected that her skull would eventually fuse with the porous plastic. From that point, Giffords no longer needed to wear the helmet that she had been wearing to protect her brain from further injury. On June 9, 2011, her aide Pia Carusone announced that while Giffords's comprehension appeared to be "close to normal, if not normal", she was not yet speaking in complete sentences. On June 12, two photos of Giffords taken on May 17 were released, the first since the shooting. On June 15, Giffords was released from the hospital to return home, where she continued speech, music, physical and occupational therapy. Having learned the French horn as a child, she picked it up again as part of her music therapy, an experience she described in a speech endorsing Joe Biden's presidential bid at the 2020 Democratic presidential convention.

On August 1, 2011, she made her return to the House floor to vote in favor of raising the debt limit ceiling. She was met with a standing ovation and accolades from her fellow members of Congress. A Giffords spokesman, Mark Kimble, stated in August 2011 that the congresswoman was walking without a cane and was writing left-handed, as she did not have full use of her right side. On October 6, Giffords traveled to Washington for her husband's retirement ceremony, where she presented him with the Distinguished Flying Cross medal. She returned to her husband's Texas home. On October 25, 2011, she travelled to Asheville, North Carolina, for intensive rehabilitation treatments, ending November 4. During her treatments in North Carolina, she stayed at the North Carolina Governor's Western Residence. In Kelly's memoir, Gabby: A Story of Courage and Hope, released in November 2011, he reported that Giffords would return to Congress. As of 2016, she continued to struggle with language and had lost fifty percent of her vision in both eyes.

During recovery, Giffords made a concerted effort to share her progress with the public through statements, videos, and other means of communication. Giffords's recovery and subsequent gun violence prevention advocacy was also chronicled in the 2022 documentary Gabby Giffords Won't Back Down, directed by Julie Cohen and Betsy West.

=== Resignation from Congress ===
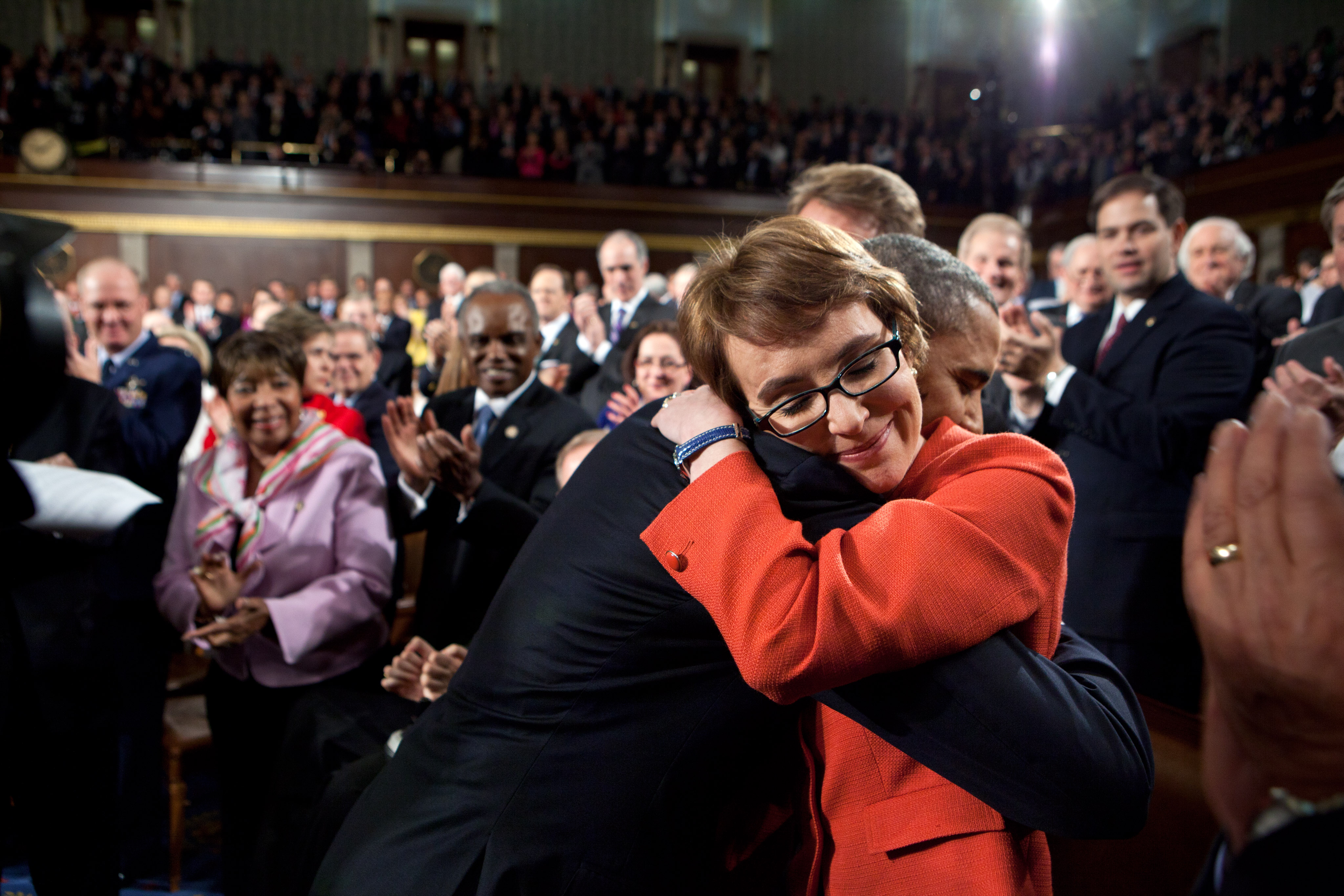
Giffords embracing President Obama at the 2012 State of the Union Address

On January 22, 2012, Giffords announced in a video statement that she intended to resign her seat so that she could focus on her recovery. She attended President Obama's 2012 State of the Union Address on January 24, and formally submitted her resignation on January 25. Appearing on the floor of the House, after the last bill she sponsored was brought to a vote and unanimously passed, Giffords was lauded by members of Congress, including both the majority and minority leaders who spoke in tribute to her strength and accomplishment in an unprecedented farewell ceremony. Her letter of resignation was read on her behalf by her close friend and fellow Democratic representative, Debbie Wasserman Schultz.

== Post-congressional activities ==
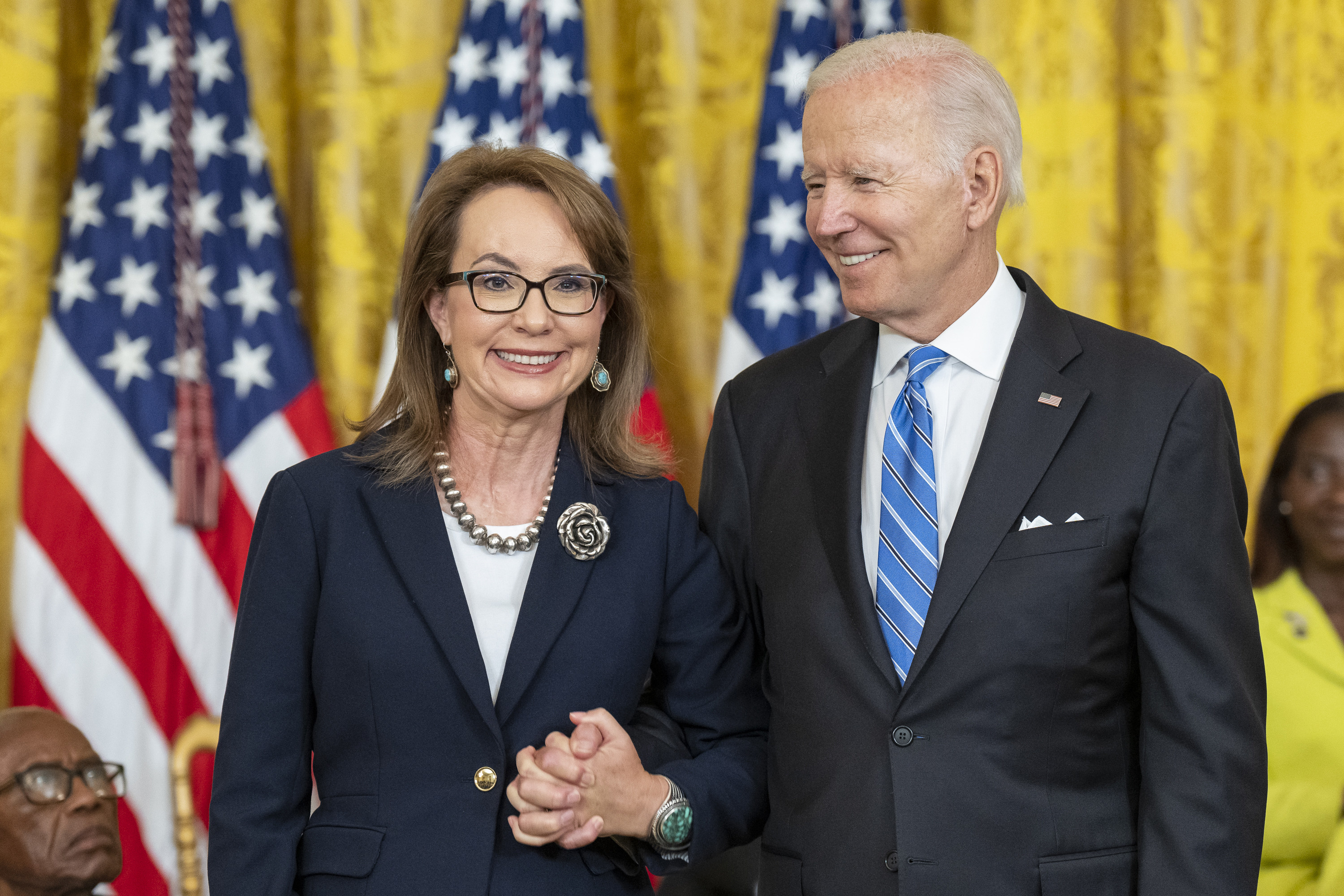
Giffords being awarded the Presidential Medal of Freedom by President Joe Biden in July 2022

A joint memoir by Giffords and her husband, Gabby: A Story of Courage and Hope, with co-author Jeffrey Zaslow, was published on November 15, 2011. Giffords and Kelly were interviewed by ABC's Diane Sawyer in their first joint interview since the shooting, which aired on a special edition of 20/20 on November 14, 2011, in conjunction with the book's publication.

Giffords has made appearances at the four Democratic National Conventions held since she left Congress. On September 6, 2012, Giffords led the Pledge of Allegiance at that evening's meeting of the 2012 Democratic National Convention. At the 2016 Democratic National Convention, Giffords delivered a speech in support of presidential nominee Hillary Clinton. For the 2020 Democratic National Convention, Giffords delivered a speech supporting presidential nominee Joe Biden and urging action on gun violence. At the 2024 Democratic National Convention held in Chicago, Illinois, she again spoke for gun safety and reform.

In January 2013, Giffords still had difficulty speaking and walking, and her right arm was paralyzed. She continued to undergo speech and physical therapy. On January 8, 2014, Giffords marked the third anniversary of her shooting by going skydiving. Giffords said on an interview with the Today show, "Oh, wonderful sky. Gorgeous mountain. Blue skies. I like a lot. A lot of fun. Peaceful, so peaceful." As of 2022, Giffords continues to experience aphasia, a disorder which diminishes her ability to communicate her thoughts through spoken language. She co-founded the organization Friends of Aphasia as a support group for others suffering the disorder.

After her shooting, Giffords became an advocate for ending gun violence in the United States. In 2013, in response to the Sandy Hook Elementary School shooting, Giffords and her husband founded the nonprofit organization Americans for Responsible Solutions (ARS) to support candidates who champion gun safety. In 2017, the organization joined forces with the Law Center to Prevent Gun Violence and renamed itself GIFFORDS, in honor of its founder.

In 2019, GIFFORDS sued the Federal Election Commission, alleging the regulatory agency failed to take action against the National Rifle Association for alleged campaign finance violations. The lawsuit, filed by GIFFORDS and the Campaign Legal Center, states the FEC did not respond to multiple complaints accusing the NRA of using shell organizations to donate more than the legal amount to the campaigns of President Trump and six Republican Senate candidates.

In October 2021, GIFFORDS launched an affiliated program focused on promoting community-based solutions to gun violence in American cities. Called GIFFORDS Center for Violence Intervention, this program began hosting the annual Community Violence Intervention Conference, the largest gathering of community violence experts and advocates in the United States.

GIFFORDS was a key player in the Biden administration's efforts against gun violence, providing research and policy suggestions that contributed to 2022’s Bipartisan Safer Communities Act, the administration's numerous executive actions on guns, and the formation of the White House Office of Gun Violence Prevention in 2023.

In 2024, GIFFORDS Law Center to Prevent Gun Violence—the legal arm of GIFFORDS— settled a major lawsuit against ghost gun company Polymer80 on behalf of Philadelphia, and undertook similar litigation in other parts of the country. In 2024, GIFFORDS Law Center was also active in the Supreme Court case United States vs. Rahimi, which was decided in favor of GIFFORDS Law Center's position.

President Joe Biden awarded Giffords the Presidential Medal of Freedom for her courage while recovering from her shooting and persistence in fighting for change on July 7, 2022. She was among recipients that “demonstrate the power of possibilities and embody the soul of the nation — hard work, perseverance, and faith,” according to the Biden administration. In 2023 she was the grand marshal of the Rose Parade and presided over both the parade and the Rose Bowl game.

== Personal life ==
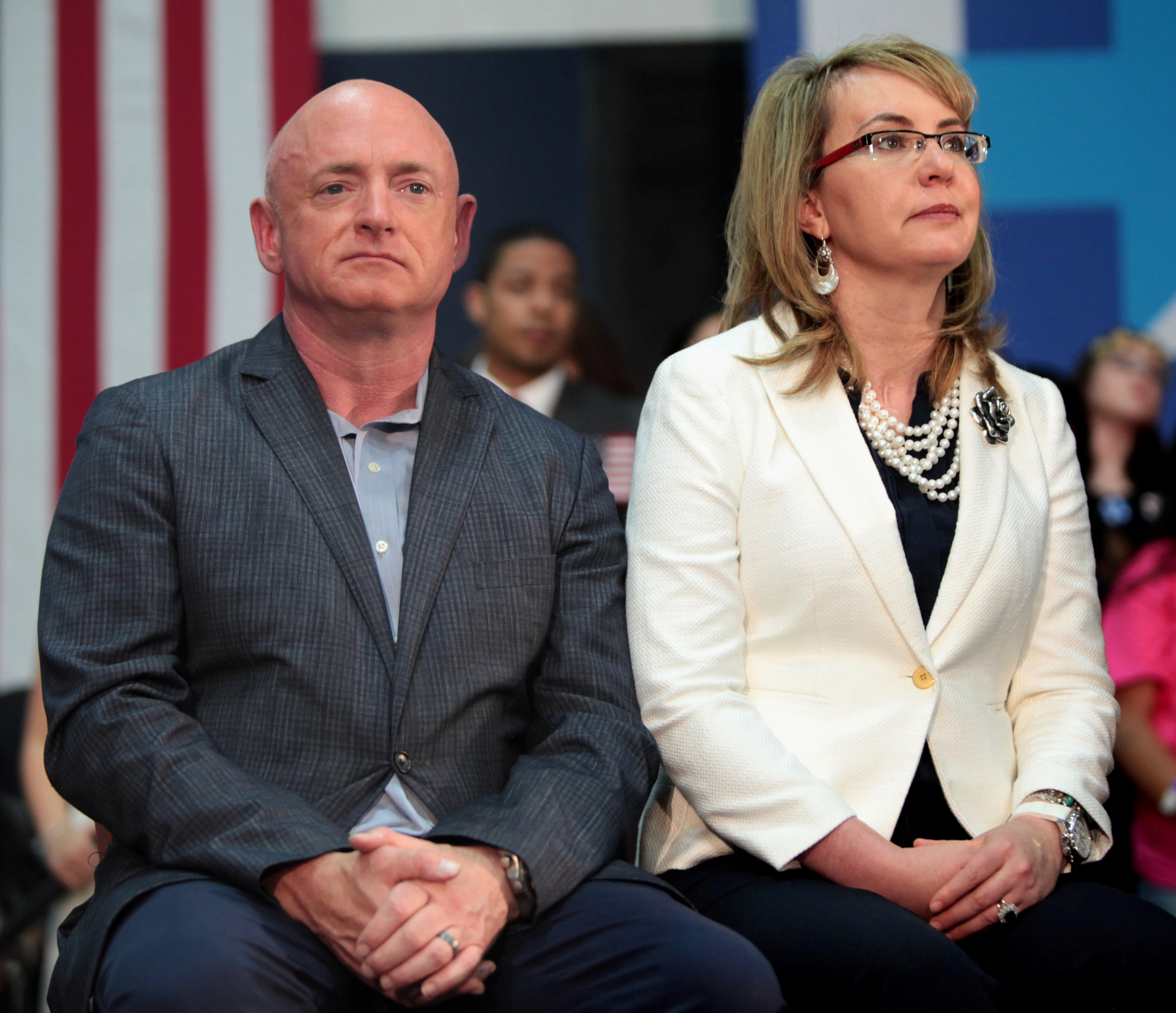
Giffords with husband Mark Kelly in 2016

Giffords married U.S. Navy Capt. Mark Kelly, a NASA astronaut, on November 10, 2007. Kelly was the Space Shuttle's pilot on the STS-108 and STS-121 missions, was the commander of STS-124 and STS-134, and became a U.S. senator for Arizona in 2020.

Giffords is a former member of the Arizona regional board of the Anti-Defamation League. After Hurricane Katrina struck in August 2005, Giffords spent time as a volunteer in Houston, Texas, in relief efforts for hurricane victims. She wrote about her experience in the Tucson Citizen.

Prior to her injury, Giffords was an avid reader, and was featured on NPR's Weekend Edition on July 9, 2006, talking about her love of books. She was periodically interviewed in 2007 together with Illinois Republican Peter Roskam on NPR's All Things Considered. The series focused on their experiences as freshman members of the 110th Congress.

== Political positions ==
=== Economy ===
Giffords voted against President Bush's Economic Stimulus Act of 2008. Giffords was one of 60 lawmakers who voted against the Emergency Economic Stabilization Act of 2008 during its first House vote before switching to a yes vote in its second House vote, and she voted for the American Recovery and Reinvestment Act of 2009.

In August 2011, she voted in favor of raising the U.S. debt ceiling.

=== Education ===
Giffords argued that Americans are competing on a global level and that this competition starts in the classroom. She was a critic of the No Child Left Behind law, arguing that it imposed an unfunded federal mandate. She also identified herself as a being a supporter of public schools and improving their efficiency.

She has also been a Girl Scout supporter for many years. On April 21, 2007 (the same day Giffords hosted her third "Congress on Your Corner" in Tucson, Arizona) she also spoke at the Sahuaro Girl Scout Council Annual Meeting.

=== Energy ===
Giffords strongly supported renewable energy (especially solar energy) as a top public policy priority. In September 2007, she published a report titled: The Community Solar Energy Initiative, Solar Energy in Southern Arizona in which it was noted that Arizona has enough sunshine to power the entire United States. The report reviewed current energy usage and discussed ways to increase the production of solar electricity. On August 1, 2008, she wrote to congressional leaders regarding tax credits that were set to expire, arguing that failure to extend the scheme would be extremely harmful to the renewable energy industry "just as it is beginning to take off".

=== Immigration and border security ===
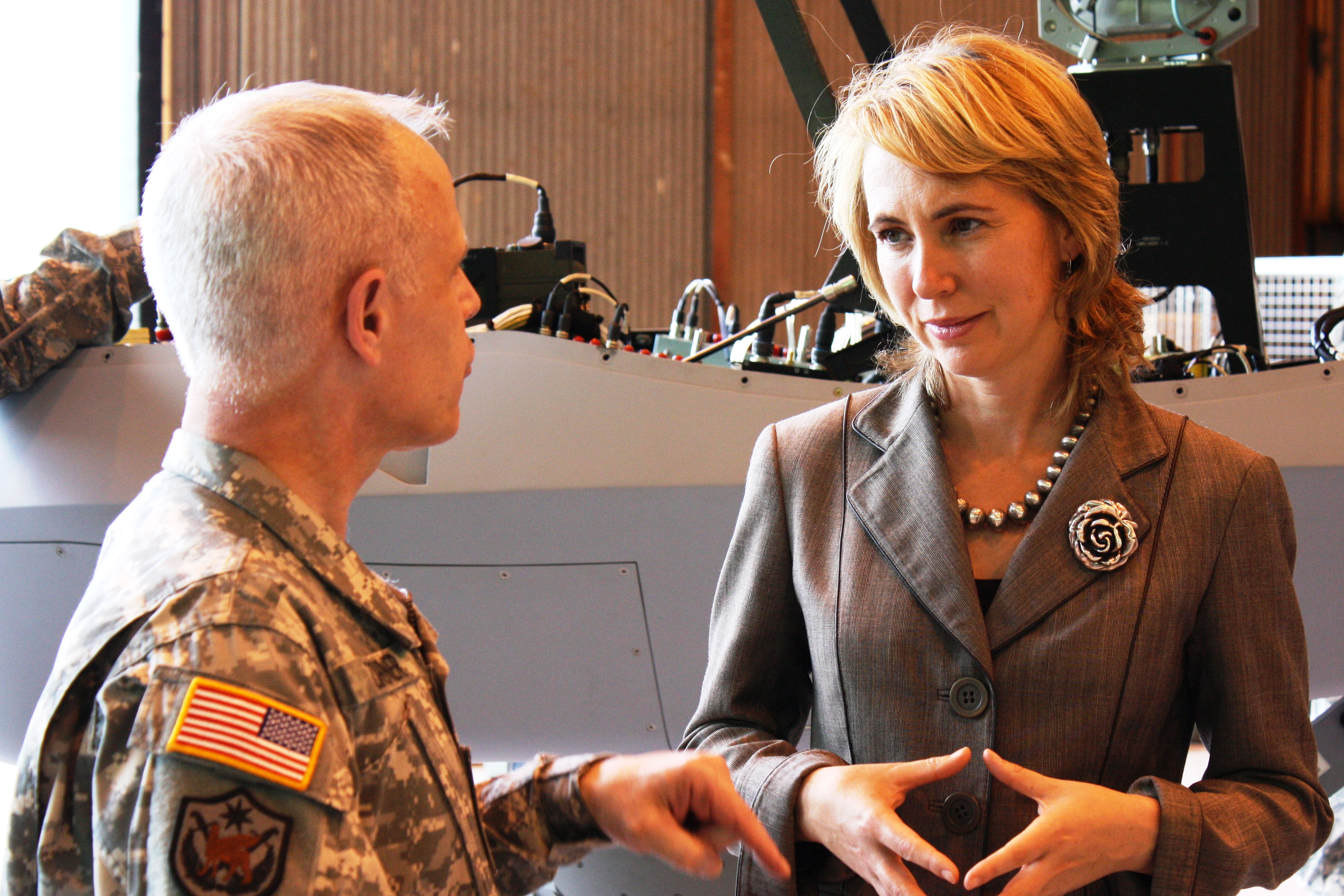
Representative Giffords speaking with a military officer in July 2010

During Giffords's tenure in the House, Arizona's 8th congressional district was one of ten in the country bordering Mexico. In 2010, Giffords stated that the Arizona SB 1070 legislation was a "clear calling that the federal government needs to do a better job" and said that she hoped that the legislation would serve as a wake-up call to the federal government. However, she stopped short of supporting the law itself, saying that it "does nothing to secure our border" and that it "stands in direct contradiction to our past and, as a result, threatens our future". She also expressed concern that SB1070 was hurting the state's ability to attract students and businesses.

On August 31, 2010, Giffords praised the arrival of National Guard troops on the border: "Arizonans have waited a long time for the deployment of the National Guard in our state. Their arrival represents a renewed national commitment to protecting our border communities from drug cartels and smugglers."

Giffords worked to secure passage of the August 2010 bill to fund more Border Patrol agents and surveillance technology for Arizona's border with Mexico. The legislation passed the House of Representatives only to be sent back by the U.S. Senate with reduced funding. Ultimately a $600-million bill was passed and signed into law. The bill was over $100 million less than Giffords fought for, but she said, "This funding signals a stronger federal commitment to protect those Americans who live and work near the border."

In 2008, Giffords introduced legislation that would have increased the cap on the H-1B visa from 65,000 per year to 130,000 per year. If that were not sufficient, according to her legislation, the cap would have been increased to 180,000 per year. The bill would have allowed, at most, 50% of employees at any given company with at least 50 employees to be H-1B guest workers. Giffords said the bill would help high-tech companies in southern Arizona, some of which rely on H-1B employees. However, Giffords's bill was never voted on by the House of Representatives.

=== Gun violence prevention ===
In 2008, before being shot, Giffords opposed prohibitions in Washington, D.C., on the possession of handguns in the home and having usable firearms there, signing an amicus brief with the U.S. Supreme Court in District of Columbia v. Heller to support its overturn.

In January 2013, Giffords and her husband Mark Kelly, motivated by the Sandy Hook shooting and their own experience with gun violence, started an organization called Americans for Responsible Solutions, whose mission was to promote gun safety legislation with elected officials and the general public. In 2016, the Law Center to Prevent Gun Violence merged with Americans for Responsible Solutions, changing the organization's name to GIFFORDS and the organization changed its name to Giffords Law Center to Prevent Gun Violence in 2017. GIFFORDS seeks to unite gun owners and gun safety advocates in a unified front against all forms of gun violence. The organization also includes the coalition Gun Owners for Safety, a forum for gun owners across the nation to mobilize in support of sensible solutions to gun violence.

Giffords was a surprise witness at a Senate Judiciary Committee hearing on gun violence on January 30, 2013. In a halting voice, she called for Congress to pass tougher laws on guns, saying "too many children are dying." Giffords is right-handed; her speech therapist had to write out her statement for her since her right arm was paralyzed in the shooting.

In 2017, after the Las Vegas shooting that killed 58 and injured 546, she implored lawmakers to take action, saying she "knows the horror of gun violence all too well."

Giffords spoke on the third night of the 2020 Democratic National Convention, urging action on gun control. She worked with a speech therapist for months in preparation for the speech, and also performed "America" on the French horn, an instrument she had played as a teen, as a symbol of her recovery.

In 2022, she launched the GIFFORDS Center for Violence Intervention to promote "evidence-based, community-driven strategies to reduce gun violence" and assist communities in community violence intervention efforts.

Giffords endorsed Kamala Harris' campaigns for U.S. senate in 2016 and president in 2024, declaring the election a "choice between Harris, who would sign a ban on assault weapons, and more gun violence under Donald Trump, who gun-rights groups back."

== Naming honors ==
It was announced by Secretary of the Navy Ray Mabus, on February 10, 2012, that the next U.S. Navy littoral combat ship would be named USS Gabrielle Giffords (LCS-10). Giffords, still recovering from injuries sustained in the 2011 assassination attempt, attended the ship's keel-laying ceremony and etched her initials into a plate welded into the ship.

USS Gabrielle Giffords was christened at the Austal USA shipyard in Mobile, Alabama, on June 13, 2015. Giffords attended the christening ceremony, along with Second Lady of the United States Jill Biden, who served as the ship's sponsor. The ship was commissioned on June 12, 2017, at a ceremony in Port of Galveston, Texas with Joe Biden, Jill Biden, Hillary Clinton, and other prominent political figures in attendance.

Some commentators have noted that several ships in the U.S. Navy, including Henry M. Jackson, Carl Vinson, John C. Stennis, Jimmy Carter, Ronald Reagan, and George Bush were named for prominent politicians who were still alive at the time of the naming. A subsequent Navy report on the naming noted that Secretary Mabus considered honoring Giffords and other victims of the Tucson shooting by naming LCS-10 after the city of Tucson, consistent with the practice of naming littoral combat ships for U.S. cities, but this was not possible because USS Tucson, an active Los Angeles-class submarine, already bears the name.

== Electoral history ==
Gabby Giffords electoral history

=== Arizona State Legislature ===
Arizona House of Representatives 13th district election, 2000
Primary election
Party	Candidate	Votes	%
Democratic	Gabrielle Giffords	4,923	35.10%
Democratic	Ted Downing	4,478	31.92%
Democratic	Howard Shore	2,992	21.33%
Democratic	Colette Barajas (withdrawn)	1,634	11.65%
Total votes		14,027	100.00%
General election
Democratic	Gabrielle Giffords	25,160	27.83%
Republican	Carol Somers	22,687	25.10%
Democratic	Ted Downing	21,684	23.99%
Republican	Jonathan Paton	20,869	23.09%
Total votes		90,400	100.00%
Democratic hold			
Republican hold			

Arizona State Senate 28th district election, 2002
Primary election
Party	Candidate	Votes	%
Democratic	Gabrielle Giffords	11,075	100.00%
Total votes		11,075	100.00%
General election
Democratic	Gabrielle Giffords	31,301	74.19%
Libertarian	Kimberly Swanson	10,888	25.81%
Total votes		42,189	100.00%
Democratic gain from Republican			

Arizona State Senate 28th district election, 2004
Primary election
Party	Candidate	Votes	%
Democratic	Gabrielle Giffords (incumbent)	9,754	100.00%
Total votes		9,754	100.00%
General election
Democratic	Gabrielle Giffords (incumbent)	43,911	64.15%
Republican	Charles H. Josephson	22,254	32.51%
Libertarian	Mick Chvala	2,289	3.34%
Total votes		68,454	100.00%
Democratic hold			

=== U.S. House ===
Arizona's 8th congressional district election, 2006
Primary election
Party	Candidate	Votes	%
Democratic	Gabrielle Giffords	33,375	54.37%
Democratic	Patty Weiss	19,148	31.19%
Democratic	Jeffrey Lynn Latas	3,687	6.01%
Democratic	Alex Rodriguez	2,855	4.65%
Democratic	William Johnson	1,768	2.88%
Democratic	Francine Shacter	576	0.94%
Total votes		61,389	100.00%
General election
Democratic	Gabrielle Giffords	137,655	54.25%
Republican	Randy Graf	106,790	42.09%
Libertarian	David F. Nolan	4,849	1.91%
Independent	Jay Quick	4,408	1.74%
Independent	Paul Price (write-in)	7	0.00%
Independent	Russ Dove (write-in)	7	0.00%
Independent	Leo F. Kimminau, Sr. (write-in)	4	0.00%
Total votes		253,720	100.00%
Democratic gain from Republican			

Arizona's 8th congressional district election, 2008
Primary election
Party	Candidate	Votes	%
Democratic	Gabrielle Giffords (incumbent)	46,223	100.00%
Total votes		46,223	100.00%
General election
Democratic	Gabrielle Giffords (incumbent)	179,629	54.73%
Republican	Tim Bee	140,553	42.82%
Libertarian	Paul Davis	8,081	2.46%
Independent	Paul Price (write-in)	3	0.00%
Total votes		328,266	100.00%
Democratic hold			

Arizona's 8th congressional district election, 2010
Primary election
Party	Candidate	Votes	%
Democratic	Gabrielle Giffords (incumbent)	55,530	100.00%
Total votes		55,530	100.00%
General election
Democratic	Gabrielle Giffords (incumbent)	138,280	48.76%
Republican	Jesse Kelly	134,124	47.30%
Libertarian	Steven Stoltz	11,174	3.94%
Total votes		283,578	100.00%
Democratic hold			

== See also ==
- Giffords
- Giffords Law Center to Prevent Gun Violence
- List of Jewish members of the United States Congress
- List of members of the United States Congress killed or wounded in office
- Women in the United States House of Representatives

U.S. House of Representatives
Preceded by Jim Kolbe	Member of the U.S. House of Representatives from Arizona's 8th congressional district 2007–2012	Succeeded by Ron Barber
U.S. order of precedence (ceremonial)
Preceded by Steve Russell as Former U.S. Representative	Order of precedence of the United States as Former U.S. Representative	Succeeded by James K. Coyne as Former U.S. Representative
