= Senator Hartley =

Senator Hartley may refer to:

- Joan Hartley (fl. 1980s–2010s), Connecticut State Senate
- Mary Hartley (born 1954), Arizona State Senate
