= Tom Freestone =

American politician

Member of the Arizona Senate from the 30th district
- In office January 1997 – January 2001
- Preceded by: Jay Blanchard
- Succeeded by: Larry Chesley

Personal details
- Born: July 15, 1938 (age 88) Mesa, Arizona
- Party: Republican
- Spouse: Phyllis
- Profession: Politician

Tom Freestone is a former member of the Arizona State Senate. He served in the Senate from January 1997 through January 2001, representing the 30th District. Freestone also worked as a county supervisor from 1978 to 1992. He worked as a judge pro tem after leaving the senate.

== Personal life ==
Freestone's father Bert served as a Mesa city councilor in the 1950s and 60s.
