= 2011 Speaker of the United States House of Representatives election =

- January 5, 2011

Needed to win: Majority of the votes cast 432 votes cast, 217 needed for a majority
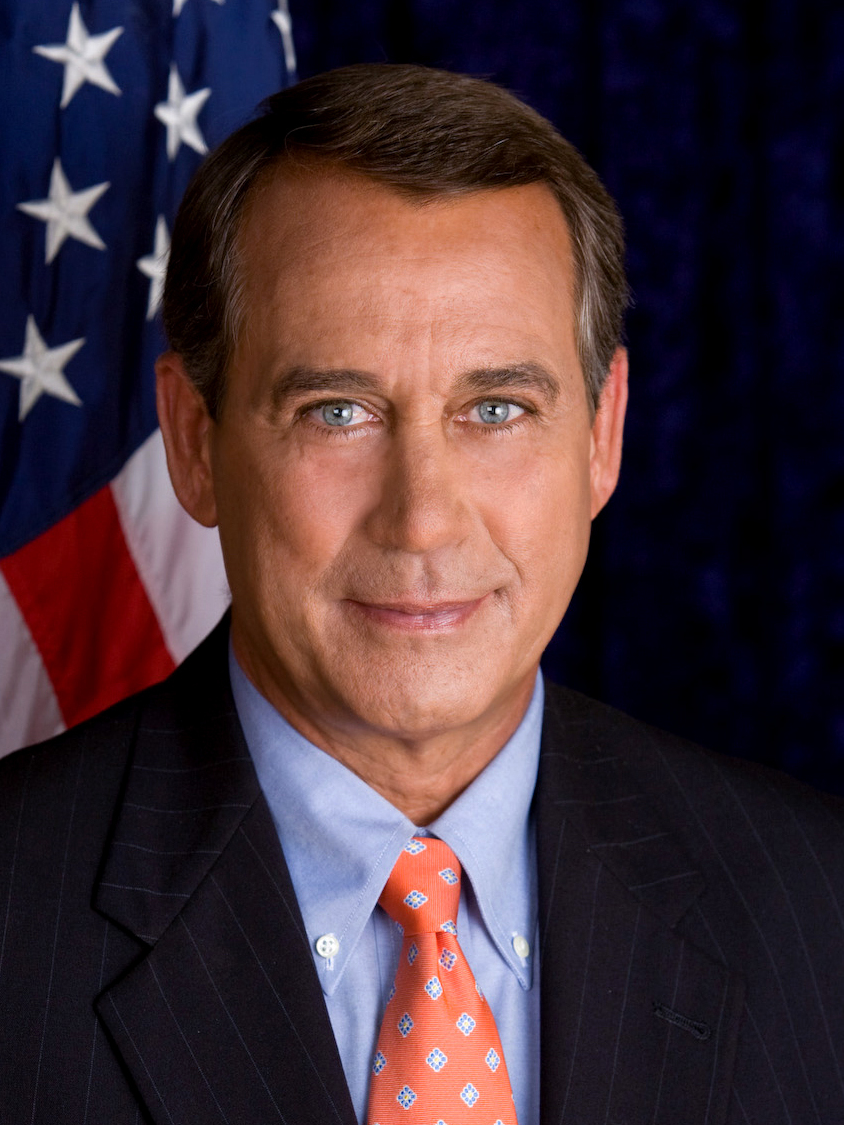

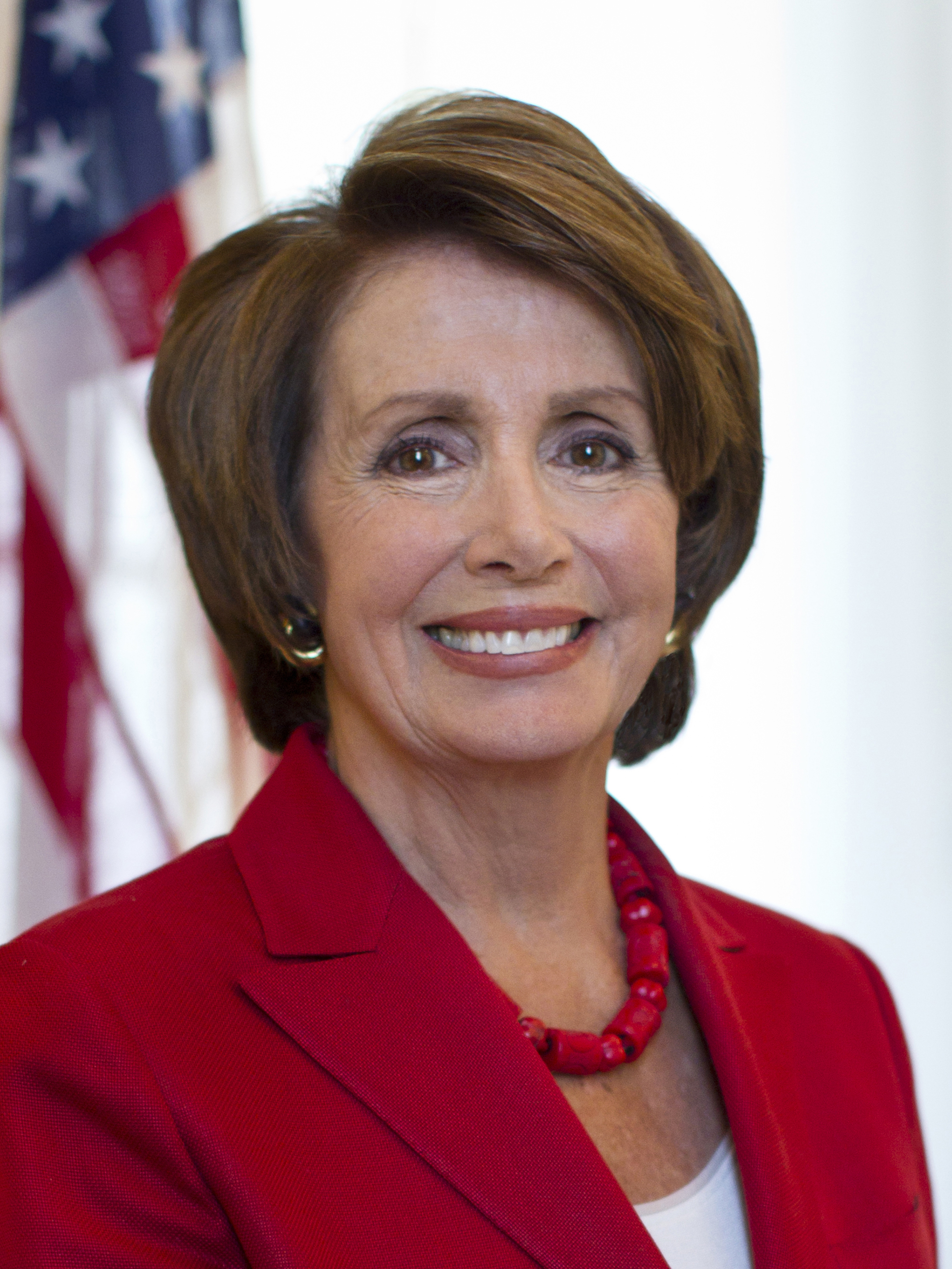

	Majority party	Minority party
Candidate	John Boehner	Nancy Pelosi
Party	Republican	Democratic
Leader's seat	Ohio 8th	California 12th
Members' vote	241	173
Percentage	55.88%	39.96%
Candidate	Others
Members' vote	28
Percentage	6.86%
Speaker before election
Nancy Pelosi
Democratic
Elected Speaker
John Boehner
Republican

On January 5, 2011, the first convening of the United States House of Representatives during the 112th United States Congress, and two months after the 2010 U.S. House elections, the incoming House members held an election for its speaker. This was 121st speaker election since the office was created in 1789. Since House Republicans had gained the previously-Democrat-held majority in the 2010 elections, Republican House Leader John Boehner unseated Democratic House Leader Nancy Pelosi as speaker.

== Background ==
=== 2010 House elections ===
Democratic had held the House majority for the previous two congresses, with their leader Nancy Pelosi serving as speaker.

The November 2010 elections were the first midterm election of Democrat Barack Obama's presidency and the first election held under redistricted maps drawn after the reapportionment that followed the 2010 census. The election saw the Democrats lose their House majority to Republicans by losing 63 seats. This was the biggest midterm-election seat change since 1938.

=== Process and conventions ===
The speaker of the United States House of Representatives is the presiding officer of the United States House of Representatives. The House elects its speaker at the beginning of a new Congress (i.e. biennially, after a general election) or when a speaker dies, resigns or is removed from the position intra-term. Since 1839, the House has elected speakers by roll call vote. Traditionally, each party's caucus or conference selects a candidate for the speakership from among its senior leaders prior to the roll call. Representatives are not restricted to voting for the candidate nominated by their party, but generally do, as the outcome of the election effectively determines which party has the majority and consequently will organize the House. Representatives that choose to vote for someone other than their party's nominated candidate usually vote for another member within the party or vote "present".

Moreover, as the Constitution does not explicitly state that the speaker must be an incumbent member of the House, it is permissible for representatives to vote for someone who is not a member of the House at the time, and non-members have received a few votes in various speaker elections over the past several years. Nevertheless, every person elected speaker has been a member.

To be elected speaker, a candidate must receive an absolute majority of the votes cast, as opposed to an absolute majority of the full membership of the House – presently 218 votes, in a House of 435. There have only been a few instances during the past century where a person received a majority of the votes cast, and thus won the election, while failing to obtain a majority of the full membership. At the time, it happened most recently in January 2015 (114th Congress), when John Boehner was elected with 216 votes (as opposed to 218). Such a variation in the number of votes necessary to win a given election might arise due to vacancies, absentees, or members being present but not voting. If no candidate wins a majority of the "votes cast for a person by name," then the roll call is repeated until a speaker is elected. Multiple roll calls have previously been needed only once since the American Civil War; they last occurred in 1923 and would not occur again until 2023. Upon winning election the new speaker is immediately sworn in by the Dean of the United States House of Representatives, the chamber's longest-serving member.

== Democratic nomination ==
Nancy Pelosi of California and Heath Shuler of North Carolina ran in the House Democratic Caucus' vote to select its leader and nominee for speaker. Pelosi had led the House Democratic Caucus since 2003. Shuler was a member of the Blue Dog Coalition, a conservative faction of Democrats that had seen a large loss of House seats in the 2010 elections. The Democratic Caucus held their vote on November 30, 2010. After a motion to postpone the election until December 8 was defeated 68–129, the caucus voted for Pelosi.

The result of the vote was:

Candidate	Votes	Percent
Nancy Pelosi	150	77.72%
Heath Shuler	43	22.28%

== Republican nomination ==
In a closed-door meeting held at the Longworth House Office Building, the House Republican Conference unanimously selected their incumbent leader John Boehner as their speaker nominee.

Candidate	Votes	Percent
John Boehner	—	100%

== Vote for speaker ==
Boehner received a majority of the votes cast and was elected speaker. A number of frustrated Blue Dog members of the Democratic Party refused to vote for Pelosi.

2011 Speaker of the United States House of Representatives election
Party	Candidate	Votes	%
Republican	John Boehner (OH 8)	241	55.88
Democratic	Nancy Pelosi (CA 8) (incumbent)	173	39.96
Democratic	Heath Shuler (NC 11)	11	2.53
Democratic	John Lewis (GA 5)	2	0.48
Democratic	Dennis Cardoza (CA 18)	1	0.23
Democratic	Jim Costa (CA 20)	1	0.23
Democratic	Jim Cooper (TN 5)	1	0.23
Democratic	Steny Hoyer (MD 5)	1	0.23
Democratic	Marcy Kaptur (OH 9)	1	0.23
Total votes		432	100
Votes necessary		217	>50

Boehner did not cast a vote in the election, while Pelosi did.

Representatives voting for someone other than their party's speaker nominee were:
■ Jason Altmire, Dan Boren, Jim Cooper, Joe Donnelly, Tim Holden, Larry Kissell, Jim Matheson, Mike McIntyre, Mike Michaud, Mike Ross, Heath Shuler, who voted for Shuler
■ John Barrow and Gabby Giffords, who voted for Lewis
■ Dennis Cardoza, who voted for Costa
■ Jim Costa, who voted for Cardoza
■ Ron Kind, who voted for Cooper
■ Dan Lipinski, who voted for Kaptur
■ Kurt Schrader, who voted for Hoyer

Representatives who voted "present" were:
■ Sanford Bishop

Representatives that did not cast votes were:
■ John Boehner of Ohio
■ Peter DeFazio of Oregon

== Sources ==
- "Congressional Record (Bound Edition)". govinfo.gov. Washington, D.C.: United States Government Publishing Office.
