= Mary Hartley =

American politician

Member of the Arizona Senate from the 20th district
- In office January 9, 1995 – January 13, 2003
- Preceded by: Lela Alston
- Succeeded by: Slade Mead

Personal details
- Born: August 16, 1954 (age 71) The Bronx, New York City, New York
- Party: Democratic

Mary Hartley (born August 16, 1954) is an American politician who served in the Arizona Senate from the 20th district from 1995 to 2003.
