= Bill Brotherton =

American politician

Bill Brotherton is an American politician from Phoenix who was a member of the Arizona Senate 2003–2007. A Democrat, Brotherton represented District 14. He served in the Arizona House 1998-2003. In 2007 he became a Maricopa County Superior Court judge. Brotherton retired from the bench effective October 31, 2017. He announced in 2017 his plans to run again for a seat in the Arizona House. He lost in the district 30 2018 democratic primary, coming in fourth.

== Education ==
He attended Cortez High School and graduated in 1980. Brotherton has a B.A. in History from Grand Canyon University and a J.D. from the University of Arizona College of Law.
