= Virginia Yrun =

American politician

Member of the Arizona Senate from the 13th district
- In office April 2001 – January 2003
- Preceded by: Andy Nichols

Personal details
- Party: Democratic
- Profession: Politician

Virginia Yrun is a former member of the Arizona State Senate. She served in the Senate from April 2001 until January 2003. She was appointed to the seat vacated upon the death of Andy Nichols on April 19, 2001. She assumed the seat a week later on April 26.
