= Edward Cirillo =

American politician

Member of the Arizona Senate from the 15th district
- In office January 1997 – January 2003
- Preceded by: Warren Austin Turner

Personal details
- Born: Troy, New York
- Party: Republican
- Spouse: Regina
- Profession: Politician

Edward Cirillo is a former member of the Arizona State Senate. He served in the House from January 1997 until January 2003. He was first elected to the House in November 1996, representing District 15, and was re-elected in 1998 and 2000. After redistricting in 2002, he ran for re-election in District 4, but lost in the Republican primary to Jack Harper.
