= Darden Hamilton =

American politician (born 1956)

Member of the Arizona Senate from the 16th district
- In office January 1999 – January 2003
- Preceded by: John Kaites

Personal details
- Born: November 28, 1956 (age 69) Pittsburgh, Pennsylvania
- Party: Republican
- Spouse: Linda
- Profession: Politician

Darden Hamilton (born November 28, 1956) is a former member of the Arizona State Senate. He served in the Senate from January 1999 until January 2003. He was first elected to the House in November 1998, representing District 16, and was re-elected in 2000. He did not run for re-election in 2002.
