= Tim Bee =

American politician from Arizona (born 1969)

President of the Arizona Senate
- In office 2007–2009
- Preceded by: Ken Bennett
- Succeeded by: Robert "Bob" Burns

Member of the Arizona Senate from the 30th district
- In office 2001–2009
- Preceded by: Keith Bee
- Succeeded by: Jonathan Paton

Personal details
- Born: June 20, 1969 (age 57) Tucson, Arizona
- Party: Republican
- Spouse: Grace
- Children: 6
- Profession: Small Business Owner

Timothy S. Bee (born June 20, 1969) is a Republican politician and business owner who served in the Arizona State Senate from 2001 through 2008. He was first elected to the Arizona Senate in 2001 and left in 2009 due to term limits. In 2008, he was the Republican candidate for Arizona's 8th congressional district seat in the United States House of Representatives. He lost to incumbent Democrat Gabby Giffords. Arizona Governor Jan Brewer later appointed him to head her Tucson office.

== Early life ==
Tim Bee was born in Tucson, Arizona on June 20, 1969. He attended Palo Verde High School, where he graduated as Valedictorian. Bee attended the University of Arizona

In 1989, Bee started the Bee Brothers Printing Company in Tucson. He owned and operated this business until he was elected to the State Senate in 2001. In his first term Bee served as the Vice-Chairman of the Appropriations and Judiciary Committees. He went on to be elected to two terms as the Senate Majority Leader, and served his final term as the President of the Senate. Bee was the first legislator from the Tucson area to serve as Senate President since Bill Jaquin in 1974.

== Political career ==
Bee was elected to the Arizona Senate in 2000 to represent Legislative District 30. He succeeded his brother Keith Bee, who had represented the same district since 1993. Tim Bee was re-elected three times: in 2002, 2004, and 2006. Bee termed-out of the legislature in 2008. The Senate is term-limited; members may serve a maximum eight years (four two year terms).

Bee served as Senate Majority Leader for two sessions from 2003 to 2006. In 2007 he was elected Senate President, the first from Southern Arizona since 1974.

Politically, Bee describes himself as a "traditional conservative Republican". Senator Bee has received endorsements from the Center for Arizona Policy, Arizona Right to Life, and the NRA Political Victory Fund. The Arizona Education Association, the Sierra Club, and the League of Conservation Voters gave him less than favorable ratings.

In 2008, Bee sponsored a measure to constitutionally ban same-sex marriage in Arizona. Arizona voters voted against a similar measure in 2006 and the proposed initiative was the source of considerable controversy, resulting in a dramatic last minute clash between legislators at the close of the 2008 session. Ultimately, as the President of the Senate, Bee cast the decisive vote in favor of putting the amendment on the Arizona ballot in 2008. The amendment passed by a 56-44% margin.

Despite Bee's conservative leanings, as president of the state senate, he has accommodated other prerogatives. In 2008, Bee was criticized by some conservative commentators for being one of four Republican State Senators who voted for a state budget unanimously favored by state Democrats.

== 2008 Congressional campaign ==
On January 19, 2008, Bee launched his campaign to challenge first-term incumbent Democrat Gabby Giffords for Congress in Arizona's 8th congressional district.

On March 7, 2008, the Rothenberg Political Report assessed Bee's campaign to be the number one challenger race in the nation. "In 2008, Giffords will face state Senate President Tim Bee (R), whose candidacy represents a slice of sunshine in an otherwise gloomy election cycle for national Republicans... the 8th District should feature one of the most competitive races for the House in the country." Roll Call newspaper said that Bee's candidacy "erases some key advantages the freshman incumbent carried into her successful 2006 Congressional campaign."

On July 18, 2008, President George W. Bush made his fourth visit to Tucson to attend a fundraiser for Bee. The fundraiser was reported to have generated over $500,000 for Bee's campaign.

Bee's campaign was co-chaired by Tucson businessman Jim Click and Sandra Froman, the immediate past President of the National Rifle Association of America. Former Congressman Jim Kolbe, who held the seat from 1985 until his retirement in 2007, also served as co-chair of the Bee campaign.

Bee was endorsed by both Arizona U.S. Senators; Jon Kyl, the Senate Minority Whip, and John McCain, the GOP nominee for President in the 2008 election.

On November 4, 2008, Bee lost the election to Giffords, 104,444 (41.45%) to 141,618(56.20%).

== After the Arizona Senate ==
In February 2009, Bee was appointed by Arizona Governor Jan Brewer to head the Governor's Office in Tucson where he served until May 2011. Bee left the Governor's office to take a position as the Senior Director for State Relations at the University of Arizona. Within four months he was promoted to serve as Associate Vice President for State Relations. Bee went on to become the Vice President for Government and Community Relations, overseeing Federal, State, Tribal, and Community Relations and the Office of Presidential Events and Visitor Services. Bee left the UA at the end of 2017 to pursue a career opportunity with the Arizona Builders Alliance where he currently serves as the Vice President, Government and Community Relations .

== Personal life ==
Bee and his wife Grace have been married for 30 years. They live in the Tucson area with their children.

Political offices
Preceded by Ken Bennett	President of the Arizona Senate; 2007 – 2009	Succeeded by Robert "Bob" Burns
Arizona Senate
Preceded by Keith Bee	Member of the Arizona Senate for the 30th District; 2001 – 2009	Succeeded by Jonathan Paton
