= Randall Gnant =

American politician (born 1945)

Randall Erich Gnant (born 1945) is an American politician who served as President of the Arizona Senate. He also filed to run for Governor of Arizona. A Republican, Gnant represented District 28 and was succeeded by Carolyn Allen.

Arizona Senate
Preceded by Ed Phillips	Arizona State Senator from the 28th District; 1995–2003	Succeeded by Carolyn Allen
Preceded by Brenda Burns	President of the Arizona Senate; 2001–2003	Succeeded by Ken Bennett
