= Toni Hellon =

American politician

Member of the Arizona Senate from the 12th district
- In office January 2001 – January 2003
- Preceded by: Ann Day

Member of the Arizona Senate from the 26th district
- In office January 2003 – January 2007
- Succeeded by: Charlene Pesquiera

Personal details
- Born: September 14, 1946 (age 80)
- Party: Republican
- Children: Brooke, Scott
- Education: University of Arizona
- Profession: Politician

Toni Hellon (born September 14, 1946) was a member of the Arizona State Senate from January 2001 until January 2007. Prior to running for the Senate, Hellon held several government positions in Pima Countyduring the 1990s, including Chief Deputy Clerk and Chief Deputy Recorder.

She was first elected to the House in November 2000, representing District 12. After redistricting in 2002, she won re-election to the Senate in District 26. Hellon won re-election again in 2004, but during her re-election bid for the November 2006 election, she was defeated in the Republican primary by Al Melvin, who lost a very close race in the general election to Charlene Pesquiera.

In 2013, she was appointed by Governor Jan Brewer to the position of Pima County Superior Court Clerk. She lost her election bid to return to the position in 2018.
