= Jay Blanchard =

American politician (born 1946)

Jay Stanley Blanchard (born 1946) served one term as a state senator in Arizona, representing District 30 for the Democrats. Born in Des Moines, Iowa, Blanchard is a former naval flight officer who received a Ph.D. in Reading Education from the University of Georgia in 1979.

In 2000, Blanchard was the token Democratic Senate candidate in the heavily Republican East Mesa district when his opponent House Speaker Republican Jeff Groscost became enmeshed in the "alt fuels" scandal that tarnished the end of Gov. Jane Hull's second term. Blanchard won in a surprising upset, giving Democrats a 15–15 split with Republicans in the Arizona Senate. Two years later, Blanchard ran for Superintendent of Public Instruction, and was defeated by Republican Tom Horne.

Prior to becoming a senator, Blanchard was a professor of psychology in education at Arizona State University. He has written three education-related books and numerous articles. After leaving politics, Blanchard returned to ASU and is currently serving as a member of the state's School District Redistricting Commission.
