= Slade Mead =

American politician

State Senator
- Constituency: Arizona

Personal details
- Born: September 6, 1961 (age 64) Torrington, Connecticut, U.S.
- Party: Democratic

Slade Mead is a former Arizona State Senator and is Republican turned Democrat.

== Family life ==
Mead was born on September 6, 1961, in Torrington, Connecticut. Both of his parents were teachers, and later on his two siblings would become teachers as well. He graduated from Taft School, studied at Yale University, where he was a member of Wolf's Head Society and, for a year in between his undergraduate and law school education, taught high school as well. Is currently the college counselor at Trinity Pawling School in Pawling, New York and teaches there as well.

In 1996, he and his wife, Alison, moved to Arizona with their two children, Lindsay and Sierra, from Virginia. His eldest daughter, Lindsay, is a special needs child with a rare form of epilepsy, a severe seizure disorder. It is his daughter that eventually drove Slade into the political arena.

== Early political career ==
As a result of his daughter's disorder, Slade became involved in her school, which then evolved into a seat on his local site council and finally a seat on the Kyrene School Board. While on the Kyrene School Board, Mead became "frustrated and dismayed" by the state's funding of their public schools. He then became frustrated with his State Senator, Lori Daniels, who seemed "indifferent to the situation". He decided to run against her.

== State Senate career ==
Mead managed to defeat Daniels in the Republican primary, and took her senate seat for District 20. He was Vice-Chairman of the Education Committee, and sat on the Appropriations and Government Committees as well.

In 2003, A fight ensued over the GOP's proposed budget. Mead eventually sided with the Democrats, citing a lack of funding for public education. This event resulted in Mead's exile from the party, and in 2004 State Representative John Huppenthal challenged him in the primary.
