= 1990 Arizona Senate election =

- November 6, 1990

All 30 seats of the Arizona Senate 16 seats needed for a majority
	Majority party	Minority party
Leader	Peter Rios	Tom Patterson
Party	Democratic	Republican
Leader's seat	7th	26th
Seats before	13	17
Seats after	17	13
Seat change	▲4	▼4
Senate President before election
Robert B. Usdane
Republican
Elected Senate President
Peter Rios
Democratic

The 1990 Arizona Senate election was held on November 6, 1990. Voters elected members of the Arizona Senate in all 30 of the state's legislative districts to serve a two-year term. Primary elections were held on September 11, 1990.

Prior to the elections, the Republicans held a majority of 17 seats over the Democrats' 13 seats.

Following the election, Democrats flipped control of the chamber and took a majority of 17 Democrats to 13 Republicans, a net gain of four seats for Democrats.

The newly elected senators served in the 40th Arizona State Legislature.

== Retiring Incumbents ==
=== Democrats ===
1. District 2: Tony Gabaldon

=== Republicans ===
1. District 12: John T. Mawhinney
2. District 14: William J. "Bill" DeLong
3. District 24: Pete Corpstein
4. District 28: Robert B. Usdane

== Incumbents Defeated in Primary Elections ==
=== Republicans ===
1. District 1: John Hays
2. District 21: Jerry Gillespie

== Incumbents Defeated in General Elections ==
=== Democrats ===
1. District 5: Jones Osborn

=== Republicans ===
1. District 9: Jeffrey J. Hill
2. District 16: Wayne Stump
3. District 18: Leo Corbet
4. District 25: Jacque Steiner

== Summary of Results by Arizona State Legislative District ==
District	Incumbent	Party	Elected Senator	Outcome
1st	John U. Hays	Rep	Carol Springer	Rep Hold
2nd	Tony Gabaldon	Dem	Karan English	Dem Hold
3rd	James Henderson Jr.	Dem	James Henderson Jr.	Dem Hold
4th	A.V. "Bill" Hardt	Dem	A.V. "Bill" Hardt	Dem Hold
5th	Jones Osborn	Dem	Jim Buster	Rep Gain
6th	Alan J. Stephens	Dem	Alan J. Stephens	Dem Hold
7th	Peter Rios	Dem	Peter Rios	Dem Hold
8th	Gus Arzberger	Dem	Gus Arzberger	Dem Hold
9th	Jeffrey J. Hill	Rep	John E. Dougherty	Dem Gain
10th	Jesus "Chuy" Higuera	Dem	Jesus "Chuy" Higuera (Note: Senator Higuera resigned from the Senate March 20, 1991; Victor E. Soltero was appointed to fill the District 10 opening effective April 1, 1991.)	Dem Hold
11th	Jaime P. Gutierrez	Dem	Jaime P. Gutierrez	Dem Hold
12th	John T. Mawhinney	Rep	Ann Day	Rep Hold
13th	David C. Bartlett	Dem	David C. Bartlett	Dem Hold
14th	William J. "Bill" DeLong	Rep	Cindy Resnick	Dem Gain
15th	Bob Denny	Rep	Bob Denny	Rep Hold
16th	Wayne Stump	Rep	Stan Furman	Dem Gain
17th	Patricia "Pat" Wright	Rep	Patricia "Pat" Wright	Rep Hold
18th	Leo Corbet	Rep	Nancy L. Hill	Dem Gain
19th	Jan Brewer	Rep	Jan Brewer	Rep Hold
20th	Lela Alston	Dem	Lela Alston	Dem Hold
21st	Jerry Gillespie	Rep	Matt Salmon	Rep Hold
22nd	Manuel "Lito" Peña Jr.	Dem	Manuel "Lito" Peña Jr.	Dem Hold
23rd	Carolyn Walker	Dem	Carolyn Walker (Note: Senator Walker was expelled from the Senate March 20, 1991; Armando Ruiz was appointed to fill the District 23 opening April 1, 1991.)	Dem Hold
24th	Pete Corpstein	Rep	John Greene	Rep Hold
25th	Jacque Steiner	Rep	Chuck Blanchard	Dem Gain
26th	Tom Patterson	Rep	Tom Patterson	Rep Hold
27th	Doug Todd	Rep	Doug Todd	Rep Hold
28th	Robert B. Usdane	Rep	Ed Phillips	Rep Hold
29th	Lester N. Pearce	Rep	Lester N. Pearce	Rep Hold
30th	James J. Sossaman	Rep	James J. Sossaman	Rep Hold

== Detailed Results ==
=== District 1 ===
Republican primary results
Party	Candidate	Votes	%
Republican	Carol Springer	10,370	50.49%
Republican	John Hays (incumbent)	10,167	49.51%
Total votes		20,537	100.00%

General election results
Party	Candidate	Votes	%
Republican	Carol Springer	35,295	100.00%
Total votes		35,295	100.00%
Republican hold			

=== District 2 ===
Democratic primary results
Party	Candidate	Votes	%
Democratic	Karan English	7,471	100.00%
Total votes		7,471	100.00%

Republican primary results
Party	Candidate	Votes	%
Republican	Joe Hart	8,607	100.00%
Total votes		8,607	100.00%

General election results
Party	Candidate	Votes	%
Democratic	Karan English	23,100	54.02%
Republican	Joe Hart	19,660	45.98%
Total votes		42,760	100.00%
Democratic hold			

=== District 3 ===
Democratic primary results
Party	Candidate	Votes	%
Democratic	James Henderson Jr. (incumbent)	4,089	53.43%
Democratic	Richie Nez	2,652	34.65%
Democratic	Herman Shorty	912	11.92%
Total votes		7,653	100.00%

Republican primary results
Party	Candidate	Votes	%
Republican	Wilson Y. Deschine	1,759	100.00%
Total votes		1,759	100.00%

General election results
Party	Candidate	Votes	%
Democratic	James Henderson Jr. (incumbent)	15,532	72.96%
Republican	Wilson Y. Deschine	5,755	27.04%
Total votes		21,287	100.00%
Democratic hold			

=== District 4 ===
Democratic primary results
Party	Candidate	Votes	%
Democratic	A. V. "Bill" Hardt (incumbent)	11,431	100.00%
Total votes		11,431	100.00%

Republican primary results
Party	Candidate	Votes	%
Republican	Joy T. Pearce	5,279	100.00%
Total votes		5,279	100.00%

General election results
Party	Candidate	Votes	%
Democratic	A. V. "Bill" Hardt (incumbent)	16,903	59.54%
Republican	Joy T. Pearce	11,488	40.46%
Total votes		28,391	100.00%
Democratic hold			

=== District 5 ===
Democratic primary results
Party	Candidate	Votes	%
Democratic	Jones Osborn (incumbent)	5,082	100.00%
Total votes		5,082	100.00%

Republican primary results
Party	Candidate	Votes	%
Republican	Jim Buster	3,973	100.00%
Total votes		3,973	100.00%

General election results
Party	Candidate	Votes	%
Republican	Jim Buster	10,836	50.41%
Democratic	Jones Osborn (incumbent)	10,659	49.59%
Total votes		21,495	100.00%
Republican gain from Democratic			

=== District 6 ===
Democratic primary results
Party	Candidate	Votes	%
Democratic	Alan Stephens (incumbent)	8,164	100.00%
Total votes		8,164	100.00%

Republican primary results
Party	Candidate	Votes	%
Republican	Craig Runbeck	4,373	50.92%
Republican	Chuck Rosenkrantz	3,095	36.04%
Republican	Juan Bautista	1,120	13.04%
Total votes		8,588	100.00%

General election results
Party	Candidate	Votes	%
Democratic	Alan Stephens (incumbent)	18,301	57.89%
Republican	Craig Runbeck	13,314	42.11%
Total votes		31,615	100.00%
Democratic hold			

=== District 7 ===
Democratic primary results
Party	Candidate	Votes	%
Democratic	Peter Rios (incumbent)	10,220	100.00%
Total votes		10,220	100.00%

Republican primary results
Party	Candidate	Votes	%
Republican	Dolores "Dodie" Rhodes	4,376	100.00%
Total votes		4,376	100.00%

General election results
Party	Candidate	Votes	%
Democratic	Peter Rios (incumbent)	16,778	59.49%
Republican	Dolores "Dodie" Rhodes	11,420	40.49%
Republican	Ken F. Kerber (Note: Ran as a write-in candidate in the general election.)	4	0.01%
Total votes		28,202	100.00%
Democratic hold			

=== District 8 ===
Democratic primary results
Party	Candidate	Votes	%
Democratic	Gus Arzberger (incumbent)	9,547	100.00%
Total votes		9,547	100.00%

Republican primary results
Party	Candidate	Votes	%
Republican	Ramiro "Tito" Ross	4,034	100.00%
Total votes		4,034	100.00%

General election results
Party	Candidate	Votes	%
Democratic	Gus Arzberger (incumbent)	12,096	50.20%
Republican	Ramiro "Tito" Ross	6,703	27.82%
Independent	Steve Vukcevich	5,299	21.99%
Total votes		24,098	100.00%
Democratic hold			

=== District 9 ===
Democratic primary results
Party	Candidate	Votes	%
Democratic	John E. Dougherty	8,015	100.00%
Total votes		8,015	100.00%

Republican primary results
Party	Candidate	Votes	%
Republican	Jeffrey J. Hill (incumbent)	10,093	100.00%
Total votes		10,093	100.00%

General election results
Party	Candidate	Votes	%
Democratic	John E. Dougherty	20,949	54.87%
Republican	Jeffrey J. Hill (incumbent)	17,233	45.13%
Total votes		38,182	100.00%
Democratic gain from Republican			

=== District 10 ===
Democratic primary results
Party	Candidate	Votes	%
Democratic	Jesus "Chuy" Higuera (incumbent)	4,901	100.00%
Total votes		4,901	100.00%

Republican primary results
Party	Candidate	Votes	%
Republican	Vicente "Vince" Becerra	1,595	100.00%
Total votes		1,595	100.00%

General election results
Party	Candidate	Votes	%
Democratic	Jesus "Chuy" Higuera (incumbent)	10,413	68.49%
Republican	Vicente "Vince" Becerra	4,774	31.40%
Libertarian	David H. Lindley	7	0.05%
Independent (Note: No party designated.)	Richard R. Hayden	6	0.04%
Democratic	Nick J. Cutrules	3	0.02%
Total votes		15,203	100.00%
Democratic hold			

=== District 11 ===
Democratic primary results
Party	Candidate	Votes	%
Democratic	Jaime P. Gutierrez (incumbent)	6,150	67.28%
Democratic	Kathleen Henry	2,991	32.72%
Total votes		9,141	100.00%

General election results
Party	Candidate	Votes	%
Democratic	Jaime P. Gutierrez (incumbent)	20,507	100.00%
Total votes		20,507	100.00%
Democratic hold			

=== District 12 ===
Democratic primary results
Party	Candidate	Votes	%
Democratic	Katherine Jacobson	8,639	100.00%
Total votes		8,639	100.00%

Republican primary results
Party	Candidate	Votes	%
Republican	Ann Day	6,516	50.80%
Republican	Bob Stash	6,310	49.20%
Total votes		12,826	100.00%

General election results
Party	Candidate	Votes	%
Republican	Ann Day	23,680	53.81%
Democratic	Katherine Jacobson	20,310	46.15%
Independent	Earl Horley	15	0.03%
Total votes		44,005	100.00%
Republican hold			

=== District 13 ===
Democratic primary results
Party	Candidate	Votes	%
Democratic	David C. Bartlett (incumbent)	8,825	100.00%
Total votes		8,825	100.00%

Republican primary results
Party	Candidate	Votes	%
Republican	Howard Parker	9,869	100.00%
Total votes		9,869	100.00%

General election results
Party	Candidate	Votes	%
Democratic	David C. Bartlett (incumbent)	22,608	55.54%
Republican	Howard Parker	18,095	44.46%
Total votes		40,703	100.00%
Democratic hold			

=== District 14 ===
Democratic primary results
Party	Candidate	Votes	%
Democratic	Cindy L. Resnick	7,656	100.00%
Total votes		7,656	100.00%

Republican primary results
Party	Candidate	Votes	%
Republican	Di Ann Ewing	5,763	50.36%
Republican	L. "Sam" DeLong	5,681	49.64%
Total votes		11,444	100.00%

General election results
Party	Candidate	Votes	%
Democratic	Cindy L. Resnick	18,662	52.98%
Republican	Di Ann D. Ewing	16,563	47.02%
Total votes		35,225	100.00%
Democratic gain from Republican			

=== District 15 ===
Republican primary results
Party	Candidate	Votes	%
Republican	Bob Denny (incumbent)	13,540	100.00%
Total votes		13,540	100.00%

General election results
Party	Candidate	Votes	%
Republican	Bob Denny (incumbent)	29,210	100.00%
Total votes		29,210	100.00%
Republican hold			

=== District 16 ===
Democratic primary results
Party	Candidate	Votes	%
Democratic	Stan Furman	5,757	100.00%
Total votes		5,757	100.00%

Republican primary results
Party	Candidate	Votes	%
Republican	Wayne Stump (incumbent)	5,712	43.98%
Republican	Jim Cooper	5,158	39.71%
Republican	Stan Sipiora	2,118	16.31%
Total votes		12,988	100.00%

General election results
Party	Candidate	Votes	%
Democratic	Stan Furman	20,379	60.24%
Republican	Wayne Stump (incumbent)	13,450	39.76%
Total votes		33,829	100.00%
Democratic gain from Republican			

=== District 17 ===
Democratic primary results
Party	Candidate	Votes	%
Democratic	Ray Reese	5,661	100.00%
Total votes		5,661	100.00%

Republican primary results
Party	Candidate	Votes	%
Republican	Patricia "Pat" Wright (incumbent)	12,051	100.00%
Total votes		12,051	100.00%

General election results
Party	Candidate	Votes	%
Republican	Patricia "Pat" Wright (incumbent)	21,290	60.37%
Democratic	Ray Reese	13,976	39.63%
Total votes		35,266	100.00%
Republican hold			

=== District 18 ===
Democratic primary results
Party	Candidate	Votes	%
Democratic	Nancy Hill	5,631	100.00%
Total votes		5,631	100.00%

Republican primary results
Party	Candidate	Votes	%
Republican	Leo Corbet (incumbent)	11,383	100.00%
Total votes		11,383	100.00%

General election results
Party	Candidate	Votes	%
Democratic	Nancy Hill	16,965	52.25%
Republican	Leo Corbet (incumbent)	15,507	47.75%
Total votes		32,472	100.00%
Democratic gain from Republican			

=== District 19 ===
Democratic primary results
Party	Candidate	Votes	%
Democratic	Marlene Abbott	7,239	100.00%
Total votes		7,239	100.00%

Republican primary results
Party	Candidate	Votes	%
Republican	Jan Brewer (incumbent)	13,598	70.09%
Republican	Joe Allman	5,802	29.91%
Total votes		19,400	100.00%

General election results
Party	Candidate	Votes	%
Republican	Jan Brewer (incumbent)	30,052	59.84%
Democratic	Marlene Abbott	20,167	40.16%
Total votes		50,219	100.00%
Republican hold			

=== District 20 ===
Democratic primary results
Party	Candidate	Votes	%
Democratic	Lela Alston (incumbent)	6,107	100.00%
Total votes		6,107	100.00%

Republican primary results
Party	Candidate	Votes	%
Republican	Harry Fennemore	6,186	100.00%
Total votes		6,186	100.00%

General election results
Party	Candidate	Votes	%
Democratic	Lela Alston (incumbent)	13,395	54.38%
Republican	Harry Fennemore	11,239	45.62%
Total votes		24,634	100.00%
Democratic hold			

=== District 21 ===
Democratic primary results
Party	Candidate	Votes	%
Democratic	Bill Hegarty	6,086	100.00%
Total votes		6,086	100.00%

Republican primary results
Party	Candidate	Votes	%
Republican	Matt Salmon	9,878	56.34%
Republican	Jerry Gillespie (incumbent)	7,655	43.66%
Total votes		17,533	100.00%

General election results
Party	Candidate	Votes	%
Republican	Matt Salmon	24,191	59.82%
Democratic	Bill Hegarty	16,227	40.12%
Republican	Tom Wilkinson	24	0.06%
Total votes		40,442	100.00%
Republican hold			

=== District 22 ===
Democratic primary results
Party	Candidate	Votes	%
Democratic	Manuel "Lito" Peña Jr. (incumbent)	4,662	100.00%
Total votes		4,662	100.00%

Republican primary results
Party	Candidate	Votes	%
Republican	Bob Mayes	1,960	100.00%
Total votes		1,960	100.00%

General election results
Party	Candidate	Votes	%
Democratic	Manuel "Lito" Peña Jr. (incumbent)	8,760	62.95%
Republican	Bob Mayes	5,156	37.05%
Total votes		13,916	100.00%
Democratic hold			

=== District 23 ===
Democratic primary results
Party	Candidate	Votes	%
Democratic	Carolyn Walker (incumbent)	4,453	75.60%
Democratic	Elizabeth Ajamie-Boyer	1,437	24.40%
Total votes		5,890	100.00%

General election results
Party	Candidate	Votes	%
Democratic	Carolyn Walker (incumbent)	10,129	99.88%
Socialist Workers	Danny K. Booher	12	0.12%
Total votes		10,141	100.00%
Democratic hold			

=== District 24 ===
Republican primary results
Party	Candidate	Votes	%
Republican	John Greene	10,642	53.39%
Republican	Kevin Lillrose	9,292	46.61%
Total votes		19,934	100.00%

General election results
Party	Candidate	Votes	%
Republican	John Greene	36,793	99.86%
Republican	Carol Rose Keppler	53	0.14%
Total votes		36,846	100.00%
Republican hold			

=== District 25 ===
Democratic primary results
Party	Candidate	Votes	%
Democratic	Chuck Blanchard	4,164	56.32%
Democratic	Ken Cheuvront	3,230	43.68%
Total votes		7,394	100.00%

Republican primary results
Party	Candidate	Votes	%
Republican	Jacque Steiner (incumbent)	8,260	100.00%
Total votes		8,260	100.00%

General election results
Party	Candidate	Votes	%
Democratic	Chuck Blanchard	14,689	52.14%
Republican	Jacque Steiner (incumbent)	13,484	47.86%
Total votes		28,173	100.00%
Democratic gain from Republican			

=== District 26 ===
Democratic primary results
Party	Candidate	Votes	%
Democratic	Paul C. Rodriguez	5,285	100.00%
Total votes		5,285	100.00%

Republican primary results
Party	Candidate	Votes	%
Republican	Tom Patterson (incumbent)	11,744	100.00%
Total votes		11,744	100.00%

General election results
Party	Candidate	Votes	%
Republican	Tom Patterson (incumbent)	19,497	63.77%
Democratic	Paul C. Rodriguez	11,075	36.23%
Total votes		30,572	100.00%
Republican hold			

=== District 27 ===
Republican primary results
Party	Candidate	Votes	%
Republican	Doug Todd (incumbent)	7,489	50.91%
Republican	Bill Valentic	7,222	49.09%
Total votes		14,711	100.00%

General election results
Party	Candidate	Votes	%
Republican	Doug Todd (incumbent)	26,100	99.71%
Independent	Ross W. Bruner	31	0.12%
None of the Above (Note: None of the above.)	Cindy Moeckel	28	0.11%
Independent (Note: Non-partisan)	Ilias Kostopoulos	17	0.06%
Total votes		26,176	100.00%
Republican hold			

=== District 28 ===
Democratic primary results
Party	Candidate	Votes	%
Democratic	Barbara Ann "Bobbie" Morgenstern	6,479	100.00%
Total votes		6,479	100.00%

Republican primary results
Party	Candidate	Votes	%
Republican	Ed Phillips	17,255	65.04%
Republican	Mike Saager	9,274	34.96%
Total votes		26,529	100.00%

General election results
Party	Candidate	Votes	%
Republican	Ed Phillips	44,242	74.73%
Democratic	Barbara Ann "Bobbie" Morgenstern	14,946	25.24%
Republican	Pete Morgan	16	0.03%
Total votes		59,204	100.00%
Republican hold			

=== District 29 ===
Republican primary results
Party	Candidate	Votes	%
Republican	Lester N. Pearce (incumbent)	10,904	100.00%
Total votes		10,904	100.00%

General election results
Party	Candidate	Votes	%
Republican	Lester N. Pearce (incumbent)	19,815	100.00%
Total votes		19,815	100.00%
Republican hold			

=== District 30 ===
Republican primary results
Party	Candidate	Votes	%
Republican	James Sossaman (incumbent)	13,736	53.19%
Republican	Jerry Brooks	12,086	46.81%
Total votes		25,822	100.00%

General election results
Party	Candidate	Votes	%
Republican	James J. Sossaman (incumbent)	44,320	100.00%
Total votes		44,320	100.00%
Republican hold			
