= 1986 Arizona House of Representatives election =

1986 Arizona House of Representatives elections
- November 4, 1986

All 60 seats in the Arizona House 31 seats needed for a majority
	Majority party	Minority party
Leader	James J. Sossaman	Art Hamilton
Party	Republican	Democratic
Leader's seat	30th	22nd
Last election	38	22
Seats after	36	24
Seat change	▼2	▲2
Speaker before election
James J. Sossaman
Republican
Elected Speaker
Joe Lane
Republican

The 1986 Arizona House of Representatives elections were held on November 4, 1986. Voters elected all 60 members of the Arizona House of Representatives in multi-member districts to serve a two-year term. The elections coincided with the elections for other offices, including Governor, U.S. Senate, U.S. House, and State Senate. Primary elections were held on September 9, 1986.

Prior to the elections, the Republicans held a majority of 38 seats over the Democrats' 22 seats.

Following the elections, Republicans maintained control of the chamber, though their majority was reduced to 36 Republicans to 24 Democrats, a net gain of two seats for Democrats.

The newly elected members served in the 38th Arizona State Legislature, during which Republican Joe Lane was elected as Speaker of the Arizona House. (Note: Lane was elected as Speaker for the 38th legislature by acclamation.)

== Summary of Results by Arizona State Legislative District ==
District	Incumbent	Party	Elected Representative	Outcome
1st	Don Aldridge	Rep	Don Aldridge	Rep Hold
1st	Dave Carson	Rep	Dave Carson	Rep Hold
2nd	John Wettaw	Rep	John Wettaw	Rep Hold
2nd	Verne Daniel Seidel Jr. (Note: Republican Sam A. McConnell Jr. of District 2 died in office on July 21, 1986. Republican Verne Daniel Seidel Jr. was appointed on August 1, 1986. Representative Seidel was appointed to fill the vacancy by the supervisors of the five counties that made up District 2 at that time.)	Rep	Karan English	Dem Gain
3rd	Benjamin Hanley	Dem	Benjamin Hanley	Dem Hold
3rd	Jack C. Jackson	Dem	Jack C. Jackson	Dem Hold
4th	E. C. "Polly" Rosenbaum	Dem	E. C. "Polly" Rosenbaum	Dem Hold
4th	Edward G. "Bunch" Guerrero	Dem	Jack A. Brown	Dem Hold
5th	Robert J. "Bob" McLendon	Dem	Robert J. "Bob" McLendon	Dem Hold
5th	Herb Guenther (Note: Democrat Herb Guenther was appointed on December 10, 1985 by the Yuma County Board of Supervisors to fill the unexpired term of Democratic Representative Frank McElhaney, deceased December 7, 1985.)	Dem	Herb Guenther	Dem Hold
6th	Jim Hartdegen	Rep	Jim Hartdegen	Rep Hold
6th	Henry Evans	Dem	Henry Evans	Dem Hold
7th	Richard "Dick" Pacheco	Dem	Richard "Dick" Pacheco	Dem Hold
7th	Roy Hudson	Dem	Roy Hudson	Dem Hold
8th	Joe Lane	Rep	Joe Lane	Rep Hold
8th	Gus Arzberger	Dem	Gus Arzberger	Dem Hold
9th	Bill English	Rep	Bill English	Rep Hold
9th	Bart Baker	Rep	Bart Baker	Rep Hold
10th	Carmen Cajero	Dem	Carmen Cajero	Dem Hold
10th	Jesus "Chuy" Higuera	Dem	Phillip Hubbard	Dem Hold
11th	Peter Goudinoff	Dem	Peter Goudinoff	Dem Hold
11th	John Kromko	Dem	John Kromko	Dem Hold
12th	Jack Jewett	Rep	Jack Jewett	Rep Hold
12th	Reid Ewing	Dem	Reid Ewing	Dem Hold
13th	Larry Hawke	Rep	Larry Hawke	Rep Hold
13th	David C. Bartlett	Dem	David C. Bartlett	Dem Hold
14th	Jim Green	Rep	Jim Green	Rep Hold
14th	Cindy Resnick	Dem	Cindy Resnick	Dem Hold
15th	James B. Ratliff	Rep	James B. Ratliff	Rep Hold
15th	Bob Denny	Rep	Bob Denny	Rep Hold
16th	Bob Hungerford	Rep	Bob Hungerford	Rep Hold
16th	Karen Mills	Rep	Karen Mills	Rep Hold
17th	Sterling Ridge	Rep	Sterling Ridge	Rep Hold
17th	Patricia "Pat" Wright	Rep	Brenda Burns	Rep Hold
18th	Jane Dee Hull	Rep	Jane Dee Hull	Rep Hold
18th	Burton S. Barr	Rep	George Weisz	Rep Hold
19th	Nancy Wessel	Rep	Nancy Wessel	Rep Hold
19th	Jan Brewer	Rep	Jim White	Rep Hold
20th	Debbie McCune	Dem	Debbie McCune	Dem Hold
20th	Trent Franks	Rep	Bobby Raymond	Dem Gain
21st	Leslie Whiting Johnson	Rep	Leslie Whiting Johnson	Rep Hold
21st	Henry H. Haws	Rep	Bob Broughton	Rep Hold
22nd	Art Hamilton	Dem	Art Hamilton	Dem Hold
22nd	Earl V. Wilcox	Dem	Earl V. Wilcox	Dem Hold
23rd	Armando Ruiz	Dem	Armando Ruiz	Dem Hold
23rd	Carolyn Walker	Dem	Sandra Kennedy	Dem Hold
24th	Chris Herstam	Rep	Chris Herstam	Rep Hold
24th	Gary Giordano	Rep	Gary Giordano	Rep Hold
25th	Elizabeth Adams Rockwell	Rep	Elizabeth Adams Rockwell	Rep Hold
25th	John King	Rep	John King	Rep Hold
26th	Jim Meredith	Rep	Jim Meredith	Rep Hold
26th	Frank Kelley	Rep	Jim Miller	Rep Hold
27th	Bev Hermon	Rep	Bev Hermon	Rep Hold
27th	Doug Todd	Rep	Jenny Norton	Rep Hold
28th	Jim Skelly	Rep	Jim Skelly	Rep Hold
28th	Heinz R. Hink	Rep	Heinz R. Hink	Rep Hold
29th	Lela Steffey	Rep	Lela Steffey	Rep Hold
29th	Jim Cooper	Rep	Don Strauch	Rep Hold
30th	Mark W. Killian	Rep	Mark W. Killian	Rep Hold
30th	James J. Sossaman	Rep	William "Bill" Mundell	Rep Hold

== Detailed Results ==
=== District 1 ===
Primary Election Results
Party	Candidate	Votes	%
Democratic Party Primary Results
Democratic	Mary "Mimi" Currier	6,709	100.00%
Total votes		6,709	100.00%
Republican Party Primary Results
Republican	Don Aldridge (incumbent)	9,078	51.98%
Republican	Dave Carson (incumbent)	8,387	48.02%
Total votes		17,465	100.00%

General Election Results
Party	Candidate	Votes	%
Republican	Don Aldridge (incumbent)	21,761	36.91%
Republican	Dave Carson (incumbent)	21,451	36.39%
Democratic	Mary "Mimi" Currier	15,743	26.70%
Total votes		58,955	100.00%
Republican hold			
Republican hold			

=== District 2 ===
Primary Election Results
Party	Candidate	Votes	%
Democratic Party Primary Results
Democratic	Karan English (Note: Was a write-in candidate in the primary election.)	1,480	73.60%
Democratic	James C. Smyth	531	26.40%
Total votes		2,011	100.00%
Republican Party Primary Results
Republican	John Wettaw (incumbent)	6,252	51.18%
Republican	Verne Seidel (incumbent)	2,886	23.62%
Republican	Sam A. McConnell Jr. (incumbent) (Note: Deceased July 21, 1986)	2,647	21.67%
Republican	Fred Pritchett	431	3.53%
Total votes		12,216	100.00%

General Election Results
Party	Candidate	Votes	%
Republican	John Wettaw (incumbent)	20,667	33.55%
Democratic	Karan English	16,023	26.01%
Republican	Verne Seidel (incumbent)	15,876	25.77%
Democratic	James C. Smyth	7,129	11.57%
Conservation, Recreation, Tourism (CRT)	John R. Parsons	1,913	3.11%
Total votes		61,608	100.00%
Republican hold			
Democratic gain from Republican			

=== District 3 ===
Primary Election Results
Party	Candidate	Votes	%
Democratic Party Primary Results
Democratic	Jack C. Jackson (incumbent)	3,118	44.13%
Democratic	Benjamin Hanley (incumbent)	2,966	41.98%
Democratic	Charlie R. Glaspie	981	13.89%
Total votes		7,065	100.00%

General Election Results
Party	Candidate	Votes	%
Democratic	Jack C. Jackson (incumbent)	11,808	52.45%
Democratic	Benjamin Hanley (incumbent)	10,705	47.55%
Total votes		22,513	100.00%
Democratic hold			
Democratic hold			

=== District 4 ===
Primary Election Results
Party	Candidate	Votes	%
Democratic Party Primary Results
Democratic	Jack A. Brown	7,226	30.40%
Democratic	E. C. "Polly" Rosenbaum (incumbent)	6,890	28.99%
Democratic	Edward G. "Bunch" Guerrero (incumbent)	6,598	27.76%
Democratic	Mattie "Bea" Brannan	3,054	12.85%
Total votes		23,768	100.00%
Republican Party Primary Results
Republican	Clarence J. "Clancy" Finman	3,123	51.35%
Republican	Raymond D. Rebert	2,959	48.65%
Total votes		6,082	100.00%

General Election Results
Party	Candidate	Votes	%
Democratic	Jack A. Brown	15,843	34.96%
Democratic	E. C. "Polly" Rosenbaum (incumbent)	15,353	33.88%
Republican	Clarence J. "Clancy" Finman	7,311	16.13%
Republican	Raymond D. Rebert	6,815	15.04%
Total votes		45,322	100.00%
Democratic hold			
Democratic hold			

=== District 5 ===
Primary Election Results
Party	Candidate	Votes	%
Democratic Party Primary Results
Democratic	Robert J. "Bob" McLendon (incumbent)	5,679	63.57%
Democratic	Herb Guenther (incumbent)	3,254	36.43%
Total votes		8,933	100.00%
Republican Party Primary Results
Republican	Morris "Court" Courtright	2,779	68.26%
Republican	Arnie Bulick	1,292	31.74%
Total votes		4,071	100.00%

General Election Results
Party	Candidate	Votes	%
Democratic	Robert J. "Bob" McLendon (incumbent)	12,332	34.65%
Democratic	Herb Guenther (incumbent)	10,325	29.01%
Republican	Morris "Court" Courtright	8,657	24.32%
Republican	Arnie Bulick	4,280	12.02%
Total votes		35,594	100.00%
Democratic hold			
Democratic hold			

=== District 6 ===
Primary Election Results
Party	Candidate	Votes	%
Democratic Party Primary Results
Democratic	Henry Evans (incumbent)	6,876	100.00%
Total votes		6,876	100.00%
Republican Party Primary Results
Republican	Jim Hartdegen (incumbent)	4,077	100.00%
Total votes		4,077	100.00%

General Election Results
Party	Candidate	Votes	%
Democratic	Henry Evans (incumbent)	12,175	50.19%
Republican	Jim Hartdegen (incumbent)	12,082	49.81%
Total votes		24,257	100.00%
Democratic hold			
Republican hold			

=== District 7 ===
Primary Election Results
Party	Candidate	Votes	%
Democratic Party Primary Results
Democratic	Richard "Dick" Pacheco (incumbent)	7,304	53.64%
Democratic	Roy Hudson (incumbent)	6,312	46.36%
Total votes		13,616	100.00%

General Election Results
Party	Candidate	Votes	%
Democratic	Roy Hudson (incumbent)	14,558	43.47%
Democratic	Richard "Dick" Pacheco (incumbent)	14,212	42.44%
People For People (PFP)	David J. Hinchliffe	4,718	14.09%
Total votes		33,488	100.00%
Democratic hold			
Democratic hold			

=== District 8 ===
Primary Election Results
Party	Candidate	Votes	%
Democratic Party Primary Results
Democratic	Gus Arzberger (incumbent)	9,915	100.00%
Total votes		9,915	100.00%
Republican Party Primary Results
Republican	Joe Lane (incumbent)	3,711	100.00%
Total votes		3,711	100.00%

General Election Results
Party	Candidate	Votes	%
Republican	Joe Lane (incumbent)	13,223	50.15%
Democratic	Gus Arzberger (incumbent)	13,145	49.85%
Total votes		26,368	100.00%
Republican hold			
Democratic hold			

=== District 9 ===
Primary Election Results
Party	Candidate	Votes	%
Democratic Party Primary Results
Democratic	William D. "Bill" Jones	4,823	55.91%
Democratic	Gerald K. Novak	3,803	44.09%
Total votes		8,626	100.00%
Republican Party Primary Results
Republican	Bill English (incumbent)	6,066	54.35%
Republican	Bart Baker (incumbent)	5,095	45.65%
Total votes		11,161	100.00%

General Election Results
Party	Candidate	Votes	%
Republican	Bill English (incumbent)	18,624	31.90%
Republican	Bart Baker (incumbent)	17,039	29.18%
Democratic	William D. "Bill" Jones	11,554	19.79%
Democratic	Gerald K. Novak	11,172	19.13%
Total votes		58,389	100.00%
Republican hold			
Republican hold			

=== District 10 ===
Primary Election Results
Party	Candidate	Votes	%
Democratic Party Primary Results
Democratic	Carmen Cajero (incumbent)	3,142	37.16%
Democratic	Phillip Hubbard	2,721	32.18%
Democratic	Roberto "Bobby" H. Castillo	2,593	30.66%
Total votes		8,456	100.00%

General Election Results
Party	Candidate	Votes	%
Democratic	Carmen Cajero (incumbent)	9,106	46.08%
Democratic	Phillip Hubbard	8,328	42.14%
People Before Profits (PBP)	Steven "Steve" Valencia	2,327	11.78%
Total votes		19,761	100.00%
Democratic hold			
Democratic hold			

=== District 11 ===
Primary Election Results
Party	Candidate	Votes	%
Democratic Party Primary Results
Democratic	John Kromko (incumbent)	5,479	43.45%
Democratic	Peter Goudinoff (incumbent)	4,977	39.47%
Democratic	John "C." Scott Ulm	2,153	17.08%
Total votes		12,609	100.00%

General Election Results
Party	Candidate	Votes	%
Democratic	John Kromko (incumbent)	14,316	50.00%
Democratic	Peter Goudinoff (incumbent)	14,314	50.00%
Total votes		28,630	100.00%
Democratic hold			
Democratic hold			

=== District 12 ===
Primary Election Results
Party	Candidate	Votes	%
Democratic Party Primary Results
Democratic	Reid Ewing (incumbent)	5,189	46.61%
Democratic	Don L. Vance	2,993	26.89%
Democratic	Bill Mangold	2,950	26.50%
Total votes		11,132	100.00%
Republican Party Primary Results
Republican	Jack Jewett (incumbent)	5,134	59.62%
Republican	Paul Julien	3,477	40.38%
Total votes		8,611	100.00%

General Election Results
Party	Candidate	Votes	%
Republican	Jack Jewett (incumbent)	19,505	30.41%
Democratic	Reid Ewing (incumbent)	17,926	27.95%
Republican	Paul Julien	15,049	23.46%
Democratic	Don L. Vance	11,666	18.19%
Total votes		64,146	100.00%
Republican hold			
Democratic hold			

=== District 13 ===
Primary Election Results
Party	Candidate	Votes	%
Democratic Party Primary Results
Democratic	David C. Bartlett (incumbent)	6,707	100.00%
Total votes		6,707	100.00%
Republican Party Primary Results
Republican	Larry Hawke (incumbent)	5,514	59.46%
Republican	Helen R. Seader	3,759	40.54%
Total votes		9,273	100.00%

General Election Results
Party	Candidate	Votes	%
Republican	Larry Hawke (incumbent)	20,683	38.04%
Democratic	David C. Bartlett (incumbent)	20,649	37.98%
Republican	Helen R. Seader	13,035	23.98%
Total votes		54,367	100.00%
Republican hold			
Democratic hold			

=== District 14 ===
Primary Election Results
Party	Candidate	Votes	%
Democratic Party Primary Results
Democratic	Cindy Resnick (incumbent)	5,289	59.53%
Democratic	Ruth Solomon	3,596	40.47%
Total votes		8,885	100.00%
Republican Party Primary Results
Republican	Jim Green (incumbent)	5,092	59.80%
Republican	Gloria Tucker	3,423	40.20%
Total votes		8,515	100.00%

General Election Results
Party	Candidate	Votes	%
Democratic	Cindy Resnick (incumbent)	17,030	29.99%
Republican	Jim Green (incumbent)	14,917	26.27%
Democratic	Ruth Solomon	13,956	24.57%
Republican	Gloria Tucker	10,891	19.18%
Total votes		56,794	100.00%
Democratic hold			
Republican hold			

=== District 15 ===
Primary Election Results
Party	Candidate	Votes	%
Republican Party Primary Results
Republican	James B. Ratliff (incumbent)	6,784	50.90%
Republican	Bob Denny (incumbent)	6,545	49.10%
Total votes		13,329	100.00%

General Election Results
Party	Candidate	Votes	%
Republican	Bob Denny (incumbent)	19,765	50.13%
Republican	James B. Ratliff (incumbent)	19,665	49.87%
Total votes		39,430	100.00%
Republican hold			
Republican hold			

=== District 16 ===
Primary Election Results
Party	Candidate	Votes	%
Democratic Party Primary Results
Democratic	Perry Clark	4,538	100.00%
Total votes		4,538	100.00%
Republican Party Primary Results
Republican	Karen Mills (incumbent)	5,572	44.56%
Republican	Bob Hungerford (incumbent)	4,058	32.45%
Republican	Dave McCarroll	2,875	22.99%
Total votes		12,505	100.00%

General Election Results
Party	Candidate	Votes	%
Republican	Karen Mills (incumbent)	17,686	41.06%
Republican	Bob Hungerford (incumbent)	16,527	38.37%
Democratic	Perry Clark	8,856	20.56%
Total votes		43,069	100.00%
Republican hold			
Republican hold			

=== District 17 ===
Primary Election Results
Party	Candidate	Votes	%
Democratic Party Primary Results
Democratic	Mildred J. Jones	3,083	50.42%
Democratic	Richard J. Jackson	3,032	49.58%
Total votes		6,115	100.00%
Republican Party Primary Results
Republican	Brenda Burns	5,216	27.94%
Republican	Sterling Ridge (incumbent)	4,470	23.95%
Republican	Chuck McKinnis	3,977	21.31%
Republican	Peter Spaw	2,803	15.02%
Republican	Tom Camp	2,200	11.79%
Total votes		18,666	100.00%

General Election Results
Party	Candidate	Votes	%
Republican	Brenda Burns	18,821	34.76%
Republican	Sterling Ridge (incumbent)	17,678	32.65%
Democratic	Mildred J. Jones	9,254	17.09%
Democratic	Richard J. Jackson	8,393	15.50%
Total votes		54,146	100.00%
Republican hold			
Republican hold			

=== District 18 ===
Primary Election Results
Party	Candidate	Votes	%
Republican Party Primary Results
Republican	Jane Dee Hull (incumbent)	5,598	30.29%
Republican	George Weisz	4,671	25.27%
Republican	Jerry Davis	4,323	23.39%
Republican	Susan Gerard	3,891	21.05%
Total votes		18,483	100.00%

General Election Results
Party	Candidate	Votes	%
Republican	Jane Dee Hull (incumbent)	19,296	54.27%
Republican	George Weisz	16,257	45.73%
Total votes		35,553	100.00%
Republican hold			
Republican hold			

=== District 19 ===
Primary Election Results
Party	Candidate	Votes	%
Democratic Party Primary Results
Democratic	Cyril "CY" Wadzita	4,617	100.00%
Total votes		4,617	100.00%
Republican Party Primary Results
Republican	Nancy Wessel (incumbent)	6,326	34.52%
Republican	Jim White	3,684	20.11%
Republican	Jack Moortel	3,295	17.98%
Republican	Angelo Calderone	2,625	14.33%
Republican	Russ "Mac" McCannon	2,393	13.06%
Total votes		18,323	100.00%

General Election Results
Party	Candidate	Votes	%
Republican	Nancy Wessel (incumbent)	22,426	42.13%
Republican	Jim White	20,652	38.80%
Democratic	Cyril "CY" Wadzita	10,155	19.08%
Total votes		53,233	100.00%
Republican hold			
Republican hold			

=== District 20 ===
Primary Election Results
Party	Candidate	Votes	%
Democratic Party Primary Results
Democratic	Debbie McCune (incumbent)	4,930	42.47%
Democratic	Bobby Raymond	2,692	23.19%
Democratic	Ben "John" Lindsey	1,319	11.36%
Democratic	James F. "Jim" Herman	1,224	10.54%
Democratic	Richard Adams	855	7.37%
Democratic	Joe Zodl	588	5.07%
Total votes		11,608	100.00%
Republican Party Primary Results
Republican	Trent Franks (incumbent)	4,120	45.84%
Republican	Georgia Hargan	2,507	27.89%
Republican	Glenn V. Stanley	2,361	26.27%
Total votes		8,988	100.00%

General Election Results
Party	Candidate	Votes	%
Democratic	Debbie McCune (incumbent)	13,866	32.24%
Democratic	Bobby Raymond	10,258	23.85%
Republican	Trent Franks (incumbent)	10,063	23.40%
Republican	Georgia Hargan	8,825	20.52%
Total votes		43,012	100.00%
Democratic hold			
Democratic gain from Republican			

=== District 21 ===
Primary Election Results
Party	Candidate	Votes	%
Democratic Party Primary Results
Democratic	Phyllis M. Milkins	2,962	52.90%
Democratic	David A. Williams	2,637	47.10%
Total votes		5,599	100.00%
Republican Party Primary Results
Republican	Leslie Whiting Johnson (incumbent)	5,052	29.89%
Republican	Bob Broughton	4,240	25.08%
Republican	Elizabeth "Beth" Decker	2,670	15.80%
Republican	Peter James Hasslacher	2,493	14.75%
Republican	Sharon Giese	2,449	14.49%
Total votes		16,904	100.00%

General Election Results
Party	Candidate	Votes	%
Republican	Bob Broughton	17,747	32.38%
Republican	Leslie Whiting Johnson (incumbent)	17,672	32.25%
Democratic	Phyllis M. Milkins	10,038	18.32%
Democratic	David A. Williams	9,347	17.06%
Total votes		54,804	100.00%
Republican hold			
Republican hold			

=== District 22 ===
Primary Election Results
Party	Candidate	Votes	%
Democratic Party Primary Results
Democratic	Art Hamilton (incumbent)	3,282	41.43%
Democratic	Earl V. Wilcox (incumbent)	3,165	39.96%
Democratic	J. "Sookie" Charles	1,474	18.61%
Total votes		7,921	100.00%
Republican Party Primary Results
Republican	Reta P. Graham	978	52.19%
Republican	Shelley Lee Vogel	896	47.81%
Total votes		1,874	100.00%

General Election Results
Party	Candidate	Votes	%
Democratic	Art Hamilton (incumbent)	7,543	35.86%
Democratic	Earl V. Wilcox (incumbent)	7,054	33.53%
Republican	Reta P. Graham	3,337	15.86%
Republican	Shelley Lee Vogel	3,103	14.75%
Total votes		21,037	100.00%
Democratic hold			
Democratic hold			

=== District 23 ===
Primary Election Results
Party	Candidate	Votes	%
Democratic Party Primary Results
Democratic	Armando Ruiz (incumbent)	2,892	33.83%
Democratic	Sandra Kennedy	1,777	20.79%
Democratic	Petra Leija Falcon	1,485	17.37%
Democratic	Clay Dix	1,046	12.24%
Democratic	Rodney M. Robles	724	8.47%
Democratic	Elbert Netters	319	3.73%
Democratic	Charles W. Townsel	305	3.57%
Total votes		8,548	100.00%

General Election Results
Party	Candidate	Votes	%
Democratic	Sandra Kennedy	6,382	51.10%
Democratic	Armando Ruiz (incumbent)	6,100	48.84%
Republican	Roland N. Campbell (Note: Was a write-in candidate in the general election.)	7	0.06%
Total votes		12,489	100.00%
Democratic hold			
Democratic hold			

=== District 24 ===
Primary Election Results
Party	Candidate	Votes	%
Democratic Party Primary Results
Democratic	Paul Benjamin	4,265	100.00%
Total votes		4,265	100.00%
Republican Party Primary Results
Republican	Chris Herstam (incumbent)	7,461	51.30%
Republican	Gary Giordano (incumbent)	7,082	48.70%
Total votes		14,543	100.00%

General Election Results
Party	Candidate	Votes	%
Republican	Chris Herstam (incumbent)	22,030	40.41%
Republican	Gary Giordano (incumbent)	18,645	34.20%
Democratic	Paul Benjamin	13,842	25.39%
Total votes		54,517	100.00%
Republican hold			
Republican hold			

=== District 25 ===
Primary Election Results
Party	Candidate	Votes	%
Democratic Party Primary Results
Democratic	Kerry Smith	4,027	59.85%
Democratic	Lee Wolfson	2,702	40.15%
Total votes		6,729	100.00%
Republican Party Primary Results
Republican	Elizabeth Adams Rockwell (incumbent)	5,330	54.45%
Republican	John King (incumbent)	4,458	45.55%
Total votes		9,788	100.00%

General Election Results
Party	Candidate	Votes	%
Republican	Elizabeth Adams Rockwell (incumbent)	14,826	31.79%
Republican	John King (incumbent)	13,829	29.65%
Democratic	Kerry Smith	9,809	21.03%
Democratic	Lee Wolfson	8,178	17.53%
Total votes		46,642	100.00%
Republican hold			
Republican hold			

=== District 26 ===
Primary Election Results
Party	Candidate	Votes	%
Democratic Party Primary Results
Democratic	Ida M. Smith	3,613	59.19%
Democratic	Al Breznay	2,491	40.81%
Total votes		6,104	100.00%
Republican Party Primary Results
Republican	Jim Meredith (incumbent)	6,715	41.06%
Republican	Jim Miller	5,253	32.12%
Republican	Paul Smith	4,386	26.82%
Total votes		16,354	100.00%

General Election Results
Party	Candidate	Votes	%
Republican	Jim Meredith (incumbent)	18,929	34.87%
Republican	Jim Miller	18,450	33.99%
Democratic	Ida M. Smith	8,906	16.41%
Democratic	Al Breznay	7,995	14.73%
Total votes		54,280	100.00%
Republican hold			
Republican hold			

=== District 27 ===
Primary Election Results
Party	Candidate	Votes	%
Democratic Party Primary Results
Democratic	Bruce B. Mason	4,664	100.00%
Total votes		4,664	100.00%
Republican Party Primary Results
Republican	Bev Hermon (incumbent)	5,261	35.90%
Republican	Jenny Norton	3,717	25.37%
Republican	Peter Gorski	3,413	23.29%
Republican	Bob Nixon	2,262	15.44%
Total votes		14,653	100.00%

General Election Results
Party	Candidate	Votes	%
Republican	Bev Hermon (incumbent)	17,328	37.02%
Republican	Jenny Norton	16,843	35.98%
Democratic	Bruce B. Mason	12,635	26.99%
Total votes		46,806	100.00%
Republican hold			
Republican hold			

=== District 28 ===
Primary Election Results
Party	Candidate	Votes	%
Republican Party Primary Results
Republican	Jim Skelly (incumbent)	10,159	58.03%
Republican	Heinz R. Hink (incumbent)	7,346	41.97%
Total votes		17,505	100.00%

General Election Results
Party	Candidate	Votes	%
Republican	Jim Skelly (incumbent)	28,422	54.97%
Republican	Heinz R. Hink (incumbent)	23,280	45.03%
Total votes		51,702	100.00%
Republican hold			
Republican hold			

=== District 29 ===
Primary Election Results
Party	Candidate	Votes	%
Democratic Party Primary Results
Democratic	Virginia Aguero	2,953	100.00%
Total votes		2,953	100.00%
Republican Party Primary Results
Republican	Lela Steffey (incumbent)	6,766	43.18%
Republican	Don Strauch	4,995	31.88%
Republican	David K. Woolf	3,909	24.95%
Total votes		15,670	100.00%

General Election Results
Party	Candidate	Votes	%
Republican	Don Strauch	15,974	42.78%
Republican	Lela Steffey (incumbent)	14,478	38.77%
Democratic	Virginia Aguero	6,889	18.45%
Total votes		37,341	100.00%
Republican hold			
Republican hold			

=== District 30 ===
Primary Election Results
Party	Candidate	Votes	%
Republican Party Primary Results
Republican	Mark W. Killian (incumbent)	8,816	46.30%
Republican	William "Bill" Mundell	4,932	25.90%
Republican	Phil Harvey	3,565	18.72%
Republican	Oscar R. Lynch	1,727	9.07%
Total votes		19,040	100.00%

General Election Results
Party	Candidate	Votes	%
Republican	Mark W. Killian (incumbent)	27,030	56.61%
Republican	William "Bill" Mundell	20,718	43.39%
Total votes		47,748	100.00%
Republican hold			
Republican hold			
