= 1988 Arizona Senate election =

- November 8, 1988

All 30 seats of the Arizona Senate 16 seats needed for a majority
	Majority party	Minority party
Leader	Robert B. Usdane	Alan Stephens
Party	Republican	Democratic
Leader's seat	28th	6th
Seats before	19	11
Seats after	17	13
Seat change	▼2	▲2
Senate President before election
Carl J. Kunasek
Republican
Elected Senate President
Robert B. Usdane
Republican

The 1988 Arizona Senate election was held on November 8, 1988. Voters elected members of the Arizona Senate in all 30 of the state's legislative districts to serve a two-year term. Primary elections were held on September 13, 1988.

Prior to the elections, the Republicans held a majority of 19 seats over the Democrats' 11 seats.

Following the election, Republicans maintained control of the chamber with 17 Republicans to 13 Democrats, a net gain of two seats for Democrats.

The newly elected senators served in the 39th Arizona State Legislature.

== Retiring Incumbents ==
=== Republicans ===
1. District 13: Greg Lunn
2. District 15: S.H. "Hal" Runyan
3. District 18: Tony West

== Incumbents Defeated in Primary Elections ==
=== Republicans ===
1. District 21: Carl J. Kunasek
2. District 26: Peter Kay
3. District 29: Jack J. Taylor

== Incumbents Defeated in General Elections ==
=== Republican ===
1. District 8: Carol Lee Macdonald

== Summary of Results by Arizona State Legislative District ==
District	Incumbent	Party	Elected Senator	Outcome
1st	John U. Hays	Rep	John U. Hays	Rep Hold
2nd	Tony Gabaldon	Dem	Tony Gabaldon	Dem Hold
3rd	James Henderson Jr.	Dem	James Henderson Jr.	Dem Hold
4th	A.V. "Bill" Hardt	Dem	A.V. "Bill" Hardt	Dem Hold
5th	Jones Osborn	Dem	Jones Osborn	Dem Hold
6th	Alan J. Stephens	Dem	Alan J. Stephens	Dem Hold
7th	Peter Rios	Dem	Peter Rios	Dem Hold
8th	Carol Lee Macdonald	Rep	Gus Arzberger	Dem Gain
9th	Jeffrey J. Hill	Rep	Jeffrey J. Hill	Rep Hold
10th	Jesus "Chuy" Higuera	Dem	Jesus "Chuy" Higuera	Dem Hold
11th	Jaime P. Gutierrez	Dem	Jaime P. Gutierrez	Dem Hold
12th	John T. Mawhinney	Rep	John T. Mawhinney	Rep Hold
13th	Greg Lunn	Rep	David C. Bartlett	Dem Gain
14th	William J. "Bill" DeLong	Rep	William J. "Bill" DeLong	Rep Hold
15th	S.H. "Hal" Runyan	Rep	Bob Denny	Rep Hold
16th	Wayne Stump	Rep	Wayne Stump	Rep Hold
17th	Patricia "Pat" Wright	Rep	Patricia "Pat" Wright	Rep Hold
18th	Tony West	Rep	Leo Corbet	Rep Hold
19th	Jan Brewer	Rep	Jan Brewer	Rep Hold
20th	Lela Alston	Dem	Lela Alston	Dem Hold
21st	Carl J. Kunasek	Rep	Jerry Gillespie	Rep Hold
22nd	Manuel "Lito" Peña Jr.	Dem	Manuel "Lito" Peña Jr.	Dem Hold
23rd	Carolyn Walker	Dem	Carolyn Walker	Dem Hold
24th	Pete Corpstein	Rep	Pete Corpstein	Rep Hold
25th	Jacque Steiner	Rep	Jacque Steiner	Rep Hold
26th	Peter Kay	Rep	Tom Patterson	Rep Hold
27th	Doug Todd	Rep	Doug Todd	Rep Hold
28th	Robert B. Usdane	Rep	Robert B. Usdane	Rep Hold
29th	Jack J. Taylor	Rep	Lester N. Pearce	Rep Hold
30th	James J. Sossaman	Rep	James J. Sossaman	Rep Hold

== Detailed Results ==
=== District 1 ===
Republican primary results
Party	Candidate	Votes	%
Republican	John Hays (incumbent)	9,442	52.36%
Republican	Shirley Mac-Noye	6,798	37.70%
Republican	Philip Beeson	1,794	9.95%
Total votes		18,034	100.00%

General election results
Party	Candidate	Votes	%
Republican	John Hays (incumbent)	33,327	65.75%
Independent	Marion L. Bigelow	17,364	34.25%
Total votes		50,691	100.00%
Republican hold			

=== District 2 ===
Democratic primary results
Party	Candidate	Votes	%
Democratic	Tony Gabaldon (incumbent)	7,729	100.00%
Total votes		7,729	100.00%

Republican primary results
Party	Candidate	Votes	%
Republican	Jim Lee	7,066	100.00%
Total votes		7,066	100.00%

General election results
Party	Candidate	Votes	%
Democratic	Tony Gabaldon (incumbent)	26,846	59.61%
Republican	Jim Lee	18,192	40.39%
Total votes		45,038	100.00%
Democratic hold			

=== District 3 ===
Democratic primary results
Party	Candidate	Votes	%
Democratic	James Henderson Jr. (incumbent)	5,766	55.68%
Democratic	Steven A. Darden	4,590	44.32%
Total votes		10,356	100.00%

Republican primary results
Party	Candidate	Votes	%
Republican	Paul Platero (Note: Ran as a write-in candidate in the primary election.)	59	100.00%
Total votes		59	100.00%

General election results
Party	Candidate	Votes	%
Democratic	James Henderson Jr. (incumbent)	20,302	100.00%
Total votes		20,302	100.00%
Democratic hold			

=== District 4 ===
Democratic primary results
Party	Candidate	Votes	%
Democratic	A. V. "Bill" Hardt (incumbent)	12,127	100.00%
Total votes		12,127	100.00%

Republican primary results
Party	Candidate	Votes	%
Republican	Brenda Udall	3,878	100.00%
Total votes		3,878	100.00%

General election results
Party	Candidate	Votes	%
Democratic	A. V. "Bill" Hardt (incumbent)	18,006	57.87%
Republican	Brenda Udall	13,109	42.13%
Total votes		31,115	100.00%
Democratic hold			

=== District 5 ===
Democratic primary results
Party	Candidate	Votes	%
Democratic	Jones Osborn (incumbent)	6,326	100.00%
Total votes		6,326	100.00%

Republican primary results
Party	Candidate	Votes	%
Republican	Arnold E. "Arnie" Bulick	3,456	100.00%
Total votes		3,456	100.00%

General election results
Party	Candidate	Votes	%
Democratic	Jones Osborn (incumbent)	16,395	63.94%
Republican	Arnold E. "Arnie" Bulick	9,248	36.06%
Total votes		25,643	100.00%
Democratic hold			

=== District 6 ===
Democratic primary results
Party	Candidate	Votes	%
Democratic	Alan Stephens (incumbent)	6,143	100.00%
Total votes		6,143	100.00%

Republican primary results
Party	Candidate	Votes	%
Republican	Juan S. Bautista Jr.	380	100.00%
Total votes		380	100.00%

General election results
Party	Candidate	Votes	%
Democratic	Alan Stephens (incumbent)	22,304	99.50%
Republican	Juan S. Bautista Jr. (Note: Was a write-in candidate in the general election.)	113	0.50%
Total votes		22,417	100.00%
Democratic hold			

=== District 7 ===
Democratic primary results
Party	Candidate	Votes	%
Democratic	Peter Rios (incumbent)	7,680	65.94%
Democratic	Jerry Michaels	3,967	34.06%
Total votes		11,647	100.00%

Republican primary results
Party	Candidate	Votes	%
Republican	Mari Gardner	2,892	100.00%
Total votes		2,892	100.00%

General election results
Party	Candidate	Votes	%
Democratic	Peter Rios (incumbent)	18,761	62.65%
Republican	Mari Gardner	11,183	37.35%
Total votes		29,944	100.00%
Democratic hold			

=== District 8 ===
Democratic primary results
Party	Candidate	Votes	%
Democratic	Gus Arzberger	8,397	63.17%
Democratic	Marjory "Marge" Ollson	4,895	36.83%
Total votes		13,292	100.00%

Republican primary results
Party	Candidate	Votes	%
Republican	Carol Lee Macdonald (incumbent)	3,131	94.36%
Republican	Clay Smith	187	5.64%
Total votes		3,318	100.00%

General election results
Party	Candidate	Votes	%
Democratic	Gus Arzberger	15,767	56.03%
Republican	Carol Lee Macdonald (incumbent)	12,371	43.97%
Total votes		28,138	100.00%
Democratic gain from Republican			

=== District 9 ===
Democratic primary results
Party	Candidate	Votes	%
Democratic	Marjel J. De Lauer	6,974	100.00%
Total votes		6,974	100.00%

Republican primary results
Party	Candidate	Votes	%
Republican	Jeffrey J. Hill (incumbent)	7,242	100.00%
Total votes		7,242	100.00%

General election results
Party	Candidate	Votes	%
Republican	Jeffrey J. Hill (incumbent)	21,979	52.95%
Democratic	Marjel J. De Lauer	19,531	47.05%
Total votes		41,510	100.00%
Republican hold			

=== District 10 ===
Democratic primary results
Party	Candidate	Votes	%
Democratic	Jesus "Chuy" Higuera (incumbent)	2,954	41.58%
Democratic	Marcario Saldate	2,792	39.30%
Democratic	Doug Shakel	1,358	19.12%
Total votes		7,104	100.00%

General election results
Party	Candidate	Votes	%
Democratic	Jesus "Chuy" Higuera (incumbent)	14,606	99.01%
Republican	Joseph L. Gartrell	146	0.99%
Total votes		14,752	100.00%
Democratic hold			

=== District 11 ===
Democratic primary results
Party	Candidate	Votes	%
Democratic	Jaime P. Gutierrez (incumbent)	7,513	100.00%
Total votes		7,513	100.00%

General election results
Party	Candidate	Votes	%
Democratic	Jaime P. Gutierrez (incumbent)	24,930	100.00%
Total votes		24,930	100.00%
Democratic hold			

=== District 12 ===
Democratic primary results
Party	Candidate	Votes	%
Democratic	Reid Ewing	7,610	100.00%
Total votes		7,610	100.00%

Republican primary results
Party	Candidate	Votes	%
Republican	John T. Mawhinney (incumbent)	6,144	100.00%
Total votes		6,144	100.00%

General election results
Party	Candidate	Votes	%
Republican	John T. Mawhinney (incumbent)	25,124	51.01%
Democratic	Reid Ewing	24,133	48.99%
Total votes		49,257	100.00%
Republican hold			

=== District 13 ===
Democratic primary results
Party	Candidate	Votes	%
Democratic	David C. Bartlett	8,132	100.00%
Total votes		8,132	100.00%

Republican primary results
Party	Candidate	Votes	%
Republican	Robert Bayne	6,696	77.72%
Republican	Albert "Slick" C. Williams	1,919	22.28%
Total votes		8,615	100.00%

General election results
Party	Candidate	Votes	%
Democratic	David C. Bartlett	26,585	57.16%
Republican	Robert Bayne	19,925	42.84%
Total votes		46,510	100.00%
Democratic gain from Republican			

=== District 14 ===
Democratic primary results
Party	Candidate	Votes	%
Democratic	Craig Runyon	3,942	53.18%
Democratic	Harold Hyams	3,471	46.82%
Total votes		7,413	100.00%

Republican primary results
Party	Candidate	Votes	%
Republican	Bill De Long (incumbent)	5,778	63.35%
Republican	Ken Chiaro	3,343	36.65%
Total votes		9,121	100.00%

General election results
Party	Candidate	Votes	%
Republican	Bill De Long (incumbent)	24,441	61.87%
Democratic	Craig Runyon	15,063	38.13%
Total votes		39,504	100.00%
Republican hold			

=== District 15 ===
Democratic primary results
Party	Candidate	Votes	%
Democratic	Pat Bosch	5,403	100.00%
Total votes		5,403	100.00%

Republican primary results
Party	Candidate	Votes	%
Republican	Bob Denny	9,904	100.00%
Total votes		9,904	100.00%

General election results
Party	Candidate	Votes	%
Republican	Bob Denny	24,667	61.91%
Democratic	Pat Bosch	15,174	38.09%
Total votes		39,841	100.00%
Republican hold			

=== District 16 ===
Democratic primary results
Party	Candidate	Votes	%
Democratic	Stan Furman	4,138	100.00%
Total votes		4,138	100.00%

Republican primary results
Party	Candidate	Votes	%
Republican	Wayne Stump (incumbent)	4,508	51.86%
Republican	Jack Kearney	4,184	48.14%
Total votes		8,692	100.00%

General election results
Party	Candidate	Votes	%
Republican	Wayne Stump (incumbent)	19,414	52.95%
Democratic	Stan Furman	17,248	47.05%
Total votes		36,662	100.00%
Republican hold			

=== District 17 ===
Democratic primary results
Party	Candidate	Votes	%
Democratic	Ray Reese	4,472	100.00%
Total votes		4,472	100.00%

Republican primary results
Party	Candidate	Votes	%
Republican	Patricia D. "Pat" Wright (incumbent)	8,693	100.00%
Total votes		8,693	100.00%

General election results
Party	Candidate	Votes	%
Republican	Patricia D. "Pat" Wright (incumbent)	24,735	67.34%
Democratic	Ray Reese	11,998	32.66%
Total votes		36,733	100.00%
Republican hold			

=== District 18 ===
Democratic primary results
Party	Candidate	Votes	%
Democratic	Madelene Van Arsdell	4,513	100.00%
Total votes		4,513	100.00%

Republican primary results
Party	Candidate	Votes	%
Republican	Leo Corbet	7,375	68.57%
Republican	Ronald J. Bellus	3,380	31.43%
Total votes		10,755	100.00%

General election results
Party	Candidate	Votes	%
Republican	Leo Corbet	21,187	58.26%
Democratic	Madelene Van Arsdell	15,177	41.74%
Total votes		36,364	100.00%
Republican hold			

=== District 19 ===
Democratic primary results
Party	Candidate	Votes	%
Democratic	Carol A. Griffin	3,397	58.12%
Democratic	Don Nilles	2,448	41.88%
Total votes		5,845	100.00%

Republican primary results
Party	Candidate	Votes	%
Republican	Jan Brewer (incumbent)	9,940	100.00%
Total votes		9,940	100.00%

General election results
Party	Candidate	Votes	%
Republican	Jan Brewer (incumbent)	33,852	64.79%
Democratic	Carol A. Griffin	18,396	35.21%
Total votes		52,248	100.00%
Republican hold			

=== District 20 ===
Democratic primary results
Party	Candidate	Votes	%
Democratic	Lela Alston (incumbent)	4,866	100.00%
Total votes		4,866	100.00%

Republican primary results
Party	Candidate	Votes	%
Republican	Ted Humes	4,311	100.00%
Total votes		4,311	100.00%

General election results
Party	Candidate	Votes	%
Democratic	Lela Alston (incumbent)	16,605	59.16%
Republican	Ted Humes	11,461	40.84%
Total votes		28,066	100.00%
Democratic hold			

=== District 21 ===
Democratic primary results
Party	Candidate	Votes	%
Democratic	William E. "Bill" Hegarty	4,835	100.00%
Total votes		4,835	100.00%

Republican primary results
Party	Candidate	Votes	%
Republican	Jerry Gillespie	7,229	55.28%
Republican	Carl J. Kunasek (incumbent)	5,849	44.72%
Total votes		13,078	100.00%

General election results
Party	Candidate	Votes	%
Republican	Jerry Gillespie	23,792	52.59%
Democratic	William E. "Bill" Hegarty	21,445	47.41%
Total votes		45,237	100.00%
Republican hold			

=== District 22 ===
Democratic primary results
Party	Candidate	Votes	%
Democratic	Manuel "Lito" Peña Jr. (incumbent)	2,540	61.04%
Democratic	Charles E. Hall Jr.	1,621	38.96%
Total votes		4,161	100.00%

Republican primary results
Party	Candidate	Votes	%
Republican	Richard Adams	1,315	100.00%
Total votes		1,315	100.00%

Libertarian Primary Results
Party	Candidate	Votes	%
Libertarian	Paul Miller	3	100.00%
Total votes		3	100.00%

General election results
Party	Candidate	Votes	%
Democratic	Manuel "Lito" Peña Jr. (incumbent)	9,954	63.98%
Republican	Richard Adams	4,830	31.05%
Libertarian	Paul Miller	773	4.97%
Total votes		15,557	100.00%
Democratic hold			

=== District 23 ===
Democratic primary results
Party	Candidate	Votes	%
Democratic	Carolyn Walker (incumbent)	3,159	56.20%
Democratic	Ben Miranda	2,462	43.80%
Total votes		5,621	100.00%

Republican primary results
Party	Candidate	Votes	%
Republican	Mary Fuentes Carr	1,020	100.00%
Total votes		1,020	100.00%

New Alliance Primary Results
Party	Candidate	Votes	%
New Alliance	Carolyn T. Lowery	2	100.00%
Total votes		2	100.00%

General election results
Party	Candidate	Votes	%
Democratic	Carolyn Walker (incumbent)	10,627	73.03%
Republican	Mary Fuentes Carr	3,504	24.08%
New Alliance	Carolyn T. Lowery	420	2.89%
Republican	Samuel Wesley	0	0.00%
Total votes		14,551	100.00%
Democratic hold			

=== District 24 ===
Republican primary results
Party	Candidate	Votes	%
Republican	Pete Corpstein (incumbent)	10,586	100.00%
Total votes		10,586	100.00%

Libertarian Primary Results
Party	Candidate	Votes	%
Libertarian	Marilyn Titschinger	44	100.00%
Total votes		44	100.00%

General election results
Party	Candidate	Votes	%
Republican	Pete Corpstein (incumbent)	39,896	80.70%
Libertarian	Marilyn Titschinger	9,544	19.30%
Total votes		49,440	100.00%
Republican hold			

=== District 25 ===
Democratic primary results
Party	Candidate	Votes	%
Democratic	Jeffrey R. Finley	4,587	100.00%
Total votes		4,587	100.00%

Republican primary results
Party	Candidate	Votes	%
Republican	Jacque Steiner (incumbent)	4,625	59.65%
Republican	Craig I. Willison	3,128	40.35%
Total votes		7,753	100.00%

General election results
Party	Candidate	Votes	%
Republican	Jacque Steiner (incumbent)	18,727	60.34%
Democratic	Jeffrey R. Finley	12,307	39.66%
Total votes		31,034	100.00%
Republican hold			

=== District 26 ===
Democratic primary results
Party	Candidate	Votes	%
Democratic	Deborah Linzer	4,242	100.00%
Total votes		4,242	100.00%

Republican primary results
Party	Candidate	Votes	%
Republican	Tom Patterson	5,855	59.90%
Republican	Peter Kay (incumbent)	3,920	40.10%
Total votes		9,775	100.00%

General election results
Party	Candidate	Votes	%
Republican	Tom Patterson	19,573	54.75%
Democratic	Deborah Linzer	16,176	45.25%
Total votes		35,749	100.00%
Republican hold			

=== District 27 ===
Republican primary results
Party	Candidate	Votes	%
Republican	Doug Todd (incumbent)	6,240	56.89%
Republican	Bill Valentic	4,729	43.11%
Total votes		10,969	100.00%

Libertarian Primary Results
Party	Candidate	Votes	%
Libertarian	Ken Van Doren	9	100.00%
Total votes		9	100.00%

General election results
Party	Candidate	Votes	%
Republican	Doug Todd (incumbent)	32,435	78.67%
Libertarian	Ken Van Doren	4,959	12.03%
Independent	Ilias Kostopoulos	3,833	9.30%
Total votes		41,227	100.00%
Republican hold			

=== District 28 ===
Republican primary results
Party	Candidate	Votes	%
Republican	Robert B. Usdane (incumbent)	11,410	100.00%
Total votes		11,410	100.00%

General election results
Party	Candidate	Votes	%
Republican	Robert B. Usdane (incumbent)	49,626	100.00%
Total votes		49,626	100.00%
Republican hold			

=== District 29 ===
Republican primary results
Party	Candidate	Votes	%
Republican	Lester N. Pearce	5,935	56.86%
Republican	Jack J. Taylor (incumbent)	4,503	43.14%
Total votes		10,438	100.00%

General election results
Party	Candidate	Votes	%
Republican	Lester N. Pearce	24,240	100.00%
Total votes		24,240	100.00%
Republican hold			

=== District 30 ===
Republican primary results
Party	Candidate	Votes	%
Republican	James J. Sossaman (incumbent)	8,136	50.93%
Republican	Larry Chesley	7,840	49.07%
Total votes		15,976	100.00%

Libertarian Primary Results
Party	Candidate	Votes	%
Libertarian	Donald Markowski	18	100.00%
Total votes		18	100.00%

General election results
Party	Candidate	Votes	%
Republican	James J. Sossaman (incumbent)	50,026	83.93%
Libertarian	Donald Markowski	9,580	16.07%
Total votes		59,606	100.00%
Republican hold			

== Summary of Votes in the Impeachment Trial of Governor Evan Mecham ==
On February 8, 1988, the Arizona House of Representatives voted to impeach Governor Evan Mecham. This caused a schism in the Arizona Republican Party since the House was controlled by Republicans and the Governor was also a Republican.

Subsequent to the House's vote to impeach, the Senate then convened the impeachment trial of Governor Mecham. On March 30, 1988, the Senate voted to dismiss Article II (pertaining to false sworn statements) for fear of putting Mecham in a position of quasi double jeopardy due to the ongoing criminal proceedings in the Superior Court of Maricopa County. The vote to dismiss Article II was Ayes-16, Noes-12, and Not Voting-2.

On April 4, 1988, the Senate voted on Article I (pertaining to obstruction of justice) and Article III (pertaining to misuse of funds) of the Articles of Impeachment. The Presiding Officer, at 4:56 p.m., announced that by a vote of 21 ayes and 9 noes, Evan Mecham was convicted of high crimes, misdemeanors or malfeasance in office, as contained in Article I of the Articles of Impeachment. The Presiding Officer announced that by a vote of 26 ayes and 4 noes, Evan Mecham was convicted of high crimes, misdemeanors or malfeasance in office, as contained in Article III of the Articles of Impeachment.

Having voted to convict on both Article I and Article III, the Senate then voted on whether to permanently disqualify Mecham from ever again holding any office of honor, trust, or profit in the State of Arizona. The Presiding Officer, at 5:30 p.m., announced that by a roll call vote of 17 ayes and 13 noes, Evan Mecham was not disqualified from holding any office of honor, trust or profit in the State. (Note: Note that the threshold to disqualify is a two-thirds vote, which would have been 20 ayes. Though 17 is a majority, it did not meet the two-thirds necessary for permanent disqualification.)

The table below summarizes the votes of each Senator during the Mecham impeachment trial and their subsequent fate in the 1988 elections.

District	Senator	Party	Article II (Note: The vote to dismiss Article II occurred on March 30, 1988.)	Article I	Article III	Permanently Disqualify Mecham	Senator's Electoral Outcome
1st	John U. Hays	Rep	Do Not Dismiss	Aye	Aye	Aye	Re-elected
2nd	Tony Gabaldon	Dem	Dismiss	Aye	Aye	Aye	Re-elected
3rd	James Henderson Jr.	Dem	Dismiss	Aye	Aye	Aye	Re-elected
4th	A.V. "Bill" Hardt	Dem	Dismiss	Aye	Aye	Aye	Re-elected
5th	Jones Osborn	Dem	Dismiss	Aye	Aye	Aye	Re-elected
6th	Alan J. Stephens	Dem	Dismiss	Aye	Aye	No	Re-elected
7th	Peter Rios	Dem	Dismiss	Aye	Aye	No	Re-elected
8th	Carol Lee Macdonald	Rep	Do Not Dismiss	Aye	Aye	Aye	Lost (General)
9th	Jeffrey J. Hill	Rep	Dismiss	No	No	Aye	Re-elected
10th	Jesus "Chuy" Higuera	Dem	Dismiss	Aye	Aye	Aye	Re-elected
11th	Jaime P. Gutierrez	Dem	Dismiss	Aye	Aye	Aye	Re-elected
12th	John T. Mawhinney	Rep	Do Not Dismiss	Aye	Aye	Aye	Re-elected
13th	Greg Lunn	Rep	Not Voting	Aye	Aye	Aye	Retired
14th	William J. "Bill" DeLong	Rep	Do Not Dismiss	Aye	Aye	Aye	Re-elected
15th	S.H. "Hal" Runyan	Rep	Not Voting	Aye	Aye	Aye	Retired
16th	Wayne Stump	Rep	Dismiss	No	No	No	Re-elected
17th	Patricia "Pat" Wright	Rep	Dismiss	No	No	No	Re-elected
18th	Tony West	Rep	Do Not Dismiss	Aye	Aye	Aye	Retired
19th	Jan Brewer	Rep	Dismiss	No	No	No	Re-elected
20th	Lela Alston	Dem	Dismiss	Aye	Aye	Aye	Re-elected
21st	Carl J. Kunasek	Rep	Do Not Dismiss	No	Aye	No	Lost (Primary)
22nd	Manuel "Lito" Peña Jr.	Dem	Dismiss	Aye	Aye	No	Re-elected
23rd	Carolyn Walker	Dem	Dismiss	Aye	Aye	Aye	Re-elected
24th	Pete Corpstein	Rep	Do Not Dismiss	Aye	Aye	No	Re-elected
25th	Jacque Steiner	Rep	Do Not Dismiss	No	Aye	No	Re-elected
26th	Peter Kay	Rep	Do Not Dismiss	No	Aye	No	Lost (Primary)
27th	Doug Todd	Rep	Do Not Dismiss	Aye	Aye	Aye	Re-elected
28th	Robert B. Usdane	Rep	Do Not Dismiss	No	Aye	No	Re-elected
29th	Jack J. Taylor	Rep	Do Not Dismiss	Aye	Aye	No	Lost (Primary)
30th	James J. Sossaman	Rep	Dismiss	No	Aye	No	Re-elected
