= 1986 Arizona Senate election =

- November 4, 1986

All 30 seats of the Arizona Senate 16 seats needed for a majority
	Majority party	Minority party
Leader	Carl J. Kunasek	Alan Stephens
Party	Republican	Democratic
Leader's seat	21st	6th
Seats before	18	12
Seats after	19	11
Seat change	▲1	▼1
Senate President before election
Stan Turley
Republican
Elected Senate President
Carl J. Kunasek
Republican

The 1986 Arizona Senate election was held on November 4, 1986. Voters elected members of the Arizona Senate in all 30 of the state's legislative districts to serve a two-year term. Primary elections were held on September 9, 1986.

Prior to the elections, the Republicans held a majority of 18 seats over the Democrats' 12 seats.

Following the election, Republicans maintained control of the chamber with 19 Republicans to 11 Democrats, a net gain of one seat for Republicans.

The newly elected senators served in the 38th Arizona State Legislature.

== Retiring Incumbents ==
=== Democrats ===
1. District 8: Ed C. Sawyer
2. District 10: Luis Armando Gonzales
3. District 23: Alfredo Gutierrez

=== Republican ===
1. District 17: Anne Lindeman
2. District 27: Juanita Harelson
3. District 30: Stan Turley

== Incumbents Defeated in Primary Elections ==
=== Republican ===
1. District 19: Bill Davis

== Summary of Results by Arizona State Legislative District ==
District	Incumbent	Party	Elected Senator	Outcome
1st	John U. Hays	Rep	John U. Hays	Rep Hold
2nd	Tony Gabaldon	Dem	Tony Gabaldon	Dem Hold
3rd	James Henderson Jr.	Dem	James Henderson Jr.	Dem Hold
4th	A.V. "Bill" Hardt	Dem	A.V. "Bill" Hardt	Dem Hold
5th	Jones Osborn	Dem	Jones Osborn	Dem Hold
6th	Alan J. Stephens	Dem	Alan J. Stephens	Dem Hold
7th	Peter Rios	Dem	Peter Rios	Dem Hold
8th	Ed C. Sawyer	Dem	Carol Lee Macdonald	Rep Gain
9th	Jeffrey J. Hill	Rep	Jeffrey J. Hill	Rep Hold
10th	Luis Armando Gonzales	Dem	Jesus "Chuy" Higuera	Dem Hold
11th	Jaime P. Gutierrez	Dem	Jaime P. Gutierrez	Dem Hold
12th	John T. Mawhinney	Rep	John T. Mawhinney	Rep Hold
13th	Greg Lunn	Rep	Greg Lunn	Rep Hold
14th	William J. "Bill" DeLong	Rep	William J. "Bill" DeLong	Rep Hold
15th	S.H. "Hal" Runyan	Rep	S.H. "Hal" Runyan	Rep Hold
16th	Wayne Stump	Rep	Wayne Stump	Rep Hold
17th	Anne Lindeman	Rep	Patricia "Pat" Wright	Rep Hold
18th	Tony West	Rep	Tony West	Rep Hold
19th	Bill Davis	Rep	Jan Brewer	Rep Hold
20th	Lela Alston	Dem	Lela Alston	Dem Hold
21st	Carl J. Kunasek	Rep	Carl J. Kunasek	Rep Hold
22nd	Manuel "Lito" Peña Jr.	Dem	Manuel "Lito" Peña Jr.	Dem Hold
23rd	Alfredo Gutierrez	Dem	Carolyn Walker	Dem Hold
24th	Pete Corpstein	Rep	Pete Corpstein	Rep Hold
25th	Jacque Steiner	Rep	Jacque Steiner	Rep Hold
26th	Peter Kay	Rep	Peter Kay	Rep Hold
27th	Juanita Harelson	Rep	Doug Todd	Rep Hold
28th	Robert B. Usdane	Rep	Robert B. Usdane	Rep Hold
29th	Jack J. Taylor	Rep	Jack J. Taylor	Rep Hold
30th	Stan Turley	Rep	James J. Sossaman	Rep Hold

== Detailed Results ==
=== District 1 ===
Republican primary results
Party	Candidate	Votes	%
Republican	John U. Hays (incumbent)	10,984	100.00%
Total votes		10,984	100.00%

General election results
Party	Candidate	Votes	%
Republican	John U. Hays (incumbent)	29,059	100.00%
Total votes		29,059	100.00%
Republican hold			

=== District 2 ===
Democratic primary results
Party	Candidate	Votes	%
Democratic	Tony Gabaldon (incumbent)	7,254	100.00%
Total votes		7,254	100.00%

General election results
Party	Candidate	Votes	%
Democratic	Tony Gabaldon (incumbent)	21,183	100.00%
Total votes		21,183	100.00%
Democratic hold			

=== District 3 ===
Democratic primary results
Party	Candidate	Votes	%
Democratic	James Henderson Jr. (incumbent)	2,972	56.80%
Democratic	Tom Shirley	1,374	26.26%
Democratic	Lloyd L. House	886	16.93%
Total votes		5,232	100.00%

General election results
Party	Candidate	Votes	%
Democratic	James Henderson Jr. (incumbent)	16,406	100.00%
Total votes		16,406	100.00%
Democratic hold			

=== District 4 ===
Democratic primary results
Party	Candidate	Votes	%
Democratic	A. V. "Bill" Hardt (incumbent)	10,479	100.00%
Total votes		10,479	100.00%

General election results
Party	Candidate	Votes	%
Democratic	A. V. "Bill" Hardt (incumbent)	20,268	100.00%
Total votes		20,268	100.00%
Democratic hold			

=== District 5 ===
Democratic primary results
Party	Candidate	Votes	%
Democratic	Jones Osborn (incumbent)	6,209	100.00%
Total votes		6,209	100.00%

General election results
Party	Candidate	Votes	%
Democratic	Jones Osborn (incumbent)	15,673	100.00%
Total votes		15,673	100.00%
Democratic hold			

=== District 6 ===
Democratic primary results
Party	Candidate	Votes	%
Democratic	Alan J. Stephens (incumbent)	7,151	100.00%
Total votes		7,151	100.00%

Republican primary results
Party	Candidate	Votes	%
Republican	Dave Blasco	3,661	100.00%
Total votes		3,661	100.00%

General election results
Party	Candidate	Votes	%
Democratic	Alan J. Stephens (incumbent)	14,840	66.86%
Republican	Dave Blasco	7,357	33.14%
Total votes		22,197	100.00%
Democratic hold			

=== District 7 ===
Democratic primary results
Party	Candidate	Votes	%
Democratic	Peter Rios (incumbent)	7,897	67.06%
Democratic	Neal Justin	3,879	32.94%
Total votes		11,776	100.00%

Republican primary results
Party	Candidate	Votes	%
Republican	Ted Wilson	2,767	100.00%
Total votes		2,767	100.00%

General election results
Party	Candidate	Votes	%
Democratic	Peter Rios (incumbent)	15,480	63.94%
Republican	Ted Wilson	8,731	36.06%
Total votes		24,211	100.00%
Democratic hold			

=== District 8 ===
Democratic primary results
Party	Candidate	Votes	%
Democratic	Steve J. Vukcevich	6,897	61.10%
Democratic	Frank N. Peters	4,391	38.90%
Total votes		11,288	100.00%

Republican primary results
Party	Candidate	Votes	%
Republican	Carol Lee Macdonald	3,580	100.00%
Total votes		3,580	100.00%

General election results
Party	Candidate	Votes	%
Republican	Carol Lee Macdonald	11,691	50.60%
Democratic	Steve J. Vukcevich	11,416	49.40%
Total votes		23,107	100.00%
Republican gain from Democratic			

=== District 9 ===
Democratic primary results
Party	Candidate	Votes	%
Democratic	Harold W. "Hal" Thomas	6,042	100.00%
Total votes		6,042	100.00%

Republican primary results
Party	Candidate	Votes	%
Republican	Jeffrey J. Hill (incumbent)	5,366	67.45%
Republican	Gene Manring	2,589	32.55%
Total votes		7,955	100.00%

General election results
Party	Candidate	Votes	%
Republican	Jeffrey J. Hill (incumbent)	19,116	60.70%
Democratic	Harold W. "Hal" Thomas	12,379	39.30%
Total votes		31,495	100.00%
Republican hold			

=== District 10 ===
Democratic primary results
Party	Candidate	Votes	%
Democratic	Jesus "Chuy" Higuera	4,717	100.00%
Total votes		4,717	100.00%

General election results
Party	Candidate	Votes	%
Democratic	Jesus "Chuy" Higuera	11,513	100.00%
Total votes		11,513	100.00%
Democratic hold			

=== District 11 ===
Democratic primary results
Party	Candidate	Votes	%
Democratic	Jaime P. Gutierrez (incumbent)	6,915	100.00%
Total votes		6,915	100.00%

General election results
Party	Candidate	Votes	%
Democratic	Jaime P. Gutierrez (incumbent)	18,766	100.00%
Total votes		18,766	100.00%
Democratic hold			

=== District 12 ===
Republican primary results
Party	Candidate	Votes	%
Republican	John T. Mawhinney (incumbent)	5,999	100.00%
Total votes		5,999	100.00%

General election results
Party	Candidate	Votes	%
Republican	John T. Mawhinney (incumbent)	27,152	100.00%
Total votes		27,152	100.00%
Republican hold			

=== District 13 ===
Republican primary results
Party	Candidate	Votes	%
Republican	Greg Lunn (incumbent)	6,585	100.00%
Total votes		6,585	100.00%

General election results
Party	Candidate	Votes	%
Republican	Greg Lunn (incumbent)	27,395	100.00%
Total votes		27,395	100.00%
Republican hold			

=== District 14 ===
Democratic primary results
Party	Candidate	Votes	%
Democratic	John P. "Jack" Fitzgerald	5,828	100.00%
Total votes		5,828	100.00%

Republican primary results
Party	Candidate	Votes	%
Republican	Bill De Long (incumbent)	6,021	100.00%
Total votes		6,021	100.00%

General election results
Party	Candidate	Votes	%
Republican	Bill De Long (incumbent)	19,735	64.79%
Democratic	John P. "Jack" Fitzgerald	10,724	35.21%
Total votes		30,459	100.00%
Republican hold			

=== District 15 ===
Republican primary results
Party	Candidate	Votes	%
Republican	S. H. "Hal" Runyan (incumbent)	9,081	100.00%
Total votes		9,081	100.00%

General election results
Party	Candidate	Votes	%
Republican	S. H. "Hal" Runyan (incumbent)	23,895	100.00%
Total votes		23,895	100.00%
Republican hold			

=== District 16 ===
Democratic primary results
Party	Candidate	Votes	%
Democratic	Thelda M. Williams	4,600	100.00%
Total votes		4,600	100.00%

Republican primary results
Party	Candidate	Votes	%
Republican	Wayne Stump (incumbent)	4,184	50.31%
Republican	Ron Young	3,648	43.86%
Republican	Stanley S. Sipiora	485	5.83%
Total votes		8,317	100.00%

General election results
Party	Candidate	Votes	%
Republican	Wayne Stump (incumbent)	18,072	63.77%
Democratic	Thelda M. Williams	10,267	36.23%
Total votes		28,339	100.00%
Republican hold			

=== District 17 ===
Republican primary results
Party	Candidate	Votes	%
Republican	Patricia "Pat" Wright	9,871	100.00%
Total votes		9,871	100.00%

General election results
Party	Candidate	Votes	%
Republican	Patricia "Pat" Wright	23,299	100.00%
Total votes		23,299	100.00%
Republican hold			

=== District 18 ===
Democratic primary results
Party	Candidate	Votes	%
Democratic	Beverly G. Davis	4,708	100.00%
Total votes		4,708	100.00%

Republican primary results
Party	Candidate	Votes	%
Republican	Tony West (incumbent)	9,807	100.00%
Total votes		9,807	100.00%

General election results
Party	Candidate	Votes	%
Republican	Tony West (incumbent)	19,280	65.72%
Democratic	Beverly G. Davis	10,058	34.28%
Total votes		29,338	100.00%
Republican hold			

=== District 19 ===
Democratic primary results
Party	Candidate	Votes	%
Democratic	David Eagle	4,762	100.00%
Total votes		4,762	100.00%

Republican primary results
Party	Candidate	Votes	%
Republican	Jan Brewer	6,128	54.26%
Republican	Tom Bearup	2,792	24.72%
Republican	Bill Davis (incumbent)	1,689	14.95%
Republican	Barbara Stirnes	685	6.07%
Total votes		11,294	100.00%

General election results
Party	Candidate	Votes	%
Republican	Jan Brewer	24,994	69.19%
Democratic	David Eagle	11,132	30.81%
Total votes		36,126	100.00%
Republican hold			

=== District 20 ===
Democratic primary results
Party	Candidate	Votes	%
Democratic	Lela Alston (incumbent)	5,887	100.00%
Total votes		5,887	100.00%

Republican primary results
Party	Candidate	Votes	%
Republican	Wayne C. Church	5,385	100.00%
Total votes		5,385	100.00%

General election results
Party	Candidate	Votes	%
Democratic	Lela Alston (incumbent)	13,927	59.66%
Republican	Wayne C. Church	9,418	40.34%
Total votes		23,345	100.00%
Democratic hold			

=== District 21 ===
Democratic primary results
Party	Candidate	Votes	%
Democratic	William "Bill" E. Hegarty	4,227	100.00%
Total votes		4,227	100.00%

Republican primary results
Party	Candidate	Votes	%
Republican	Carl J. Kunasek (incumbent)	8,943	100.00%
Total votes		8,943	100.00%

General election results
Party	Candidate	Votes	%
Republican	Carl J. Kunasek (incumbent)	19,002	64.05%
Democratic	William "Bill" E. Hegarty	10,665	35.95%
Total votes		29,667	100.00%
Republican hold			

=== District 22 ===
Democratic primary results
Party	Candidate	Votes	%
Democratic	Manuel "Lito" Peña Jr. (incumbent)	4,614	100.00%
Total votes		4,614	100.00%

Republican primary results
Party	Candidate	Votes	%
Republican	Joe Browning	1,500	100.00%
Total votes		1,500	100.00%

General election results
Party	Candidate	Votes	%
Democratic	Manuel "Lito" Peña Jr. (incumbent)	7,514	63.41%
Republican	Joe Browning	4,336	36.59%
Total votes		11,850	100.00%
Democratic hold			

=== District 23 ===
Democratic primary results
Party	Candidate	Votes	%
Democratic	Carolyn Walker	2,013	36.06%
Democratic	Joe Eddie Lopez	1,378	24.68%
Democratic	Leticia Ruiz	1,126	20.17%
Democratic	Cloves C. Campbell	1,066	19.09%
Total votes		5,583	100.00%

Republican primary results
Party	Candidate	Votes	%
Republican	Mary K. Carr	803	64.60%
Republican	Anthony Aleman Abril Jr.	440	35.40%
Total votes		1,243	100.00%

General election results
Party	Candidate	Votes	%
Democratic	Carolyn Walker	8,392	73.99%
Republican	Mary K. Carr	2,949	26.00%
Libertarian	"BW" Chad Raible	1	0.01%
Total votes		11,342	100.00%
Democratic hold			

=== District 24 ===
Democratic primary results
Party	Candidate	Votes	%
Democratic	Clifford Sherr	4,265	100.00%
Total votes		4,265	100.00%

Republican primary results
Party	Candidate	Votes	%
Republican	Pete Corpstein (incumbent)	6,596	53.16%
Republican	Jeanne Herberger	5,812	46.84%
Total votes		12,408	100.00%

General election results
Party	Candidate	Votes	%
Republican	Pete Corpstein (incumbent)	24,981	69.40%
Democratic	Clifford Sherr	11,013	30.60%
Total votes		35,994	100.00%
Republican hold			

=== District 25 ===
Republican primary results
Party	Candidate	Votes	%
Republican	Jacque Steiner (incumbent)	7,043	100.00%
Total votes		7,043	100.00%

General election results
Party	Candidate	Votes	%
Republican	Jacque Steiner (incumbent)	19,850	100.00%
Total votes		19,850	100.00%
Republican hold			

=== District 26 ===
Republican primary results
Party	Candidate	Votes	%
Republican	Peter Kay (incumbent)	6,435	59.79%
Republican	Jean L. Black	4,328	40.21%
Total votes		10,763	100.00%

General election results
Party	Candidate	Votes	%
Republican	Peter Kay (incumbent)	22,464	100.00%
Total votes		22,464	100.00%
Republican hold			

=== District 27 ===
Democratic primary results
Party	Candidate	Votes	%
Democratic	Victor Aronow	4,527	100.00%
Total votes		4,527	100.00%

Republican primary results
Party	Candidate	Votes	%
Republican	Doug Todd	7,925	100.00%
Total votes		7,925	100.00%

General election results
Party	Candidate	Votes	%
Republican	Doug Todd	19,714	64.66%
Democratic	Victor Aronow	10,776	35.34%
Total votes		30,490	100.00%
Republican hold			

=== District 28 ===
Republican primary results
Party	Candidate	Votes	%
Republican	Robert B. Usdane (incumbent)	12,114	100.00%
Total votes		12,114	100.00%

General election results
Party	Candidate	Votes	%
Republican	Robert B. Usdane (incumbent)	32,981	100.00%
Total votes		32,981	100.00%
Republican hold			

=== District 29 ===
Republican primary results
Party	Candidate	Votes	%
Republican	Jack J. Taylor (incumbent)	8,700	100.00%
Total votes		8,700	100.00%

General election results
Party	Candidate	Votes	%
Republican	Jack J. Taylor (incumbent)	19,508	100.00%
Total votes		19,508	100.00%
Republican hold			

=== District 30 ===
Republican primary results
Party	Candidate	Votes	%
Republican	James J. Sossaman	11,227	100.00%
Total votes		11,227	100.00%

General election results
Party	Candidate	Votes	%
Republican	James J. Sossaman	32,086	100.00%
Total votes		32,086	100.00%
Republican hold			
