= 1960 Arizona Senate election =

- November 8, 1960

All 28 seats of the Arizona Senate 15 seats needed for a majority
	Majority party	Minority party
Party	Democratic	Republican
Seats before	27	1
Seats after	24	4
Seat change	▼3	▲3
Senate President before election
Clarence L. Carpenter
Democratic
Elected Senate President
Clarence L. Carpenter
Democratic

The 1960 Arizona Senate election was held on November 8, 1960. Voters elected all 28 members of the Arizona Senate to serve two-year terms. At the time, each of Arizona's 14 counties elected two state senators for a total of 28 members of the Arizona Senate. Primary elections were held on September 13, 1960.

Prior to the elections, the Democrats held a supermajority of 27 seats over the single Republican Senator.

Following the election, Democrats maintained control of the chamber and their supermajority with 24 Democrats to 4 Republicans. The newly elected senators served in the 25th Arizona State Legislature, which met for two regular sessions at the State Capitol in Phoenix. The first opened on January 9, 1961, and adjourned on March 24; while the second convened on January 8, 1962, and adjourned on March 22. There was a single Special Session, which convened on July 17, 1961, and adjourned sine die on July 31.

The Republicans had a net gain of 3 seats in the Arizona Senate following the election.

== Summary of Results by County ==
County	Incumbent	Party	Elected Senator	Outcome
Apache	Lynn Lockhart	Dem	Bert J. Colter	Dem Hold
Apache	Melvin C. Greer	Dem	Albert F. Anderson	Rep Gain
Cochise	A. R. Spikes	Dem	A. R. Spikes	Dem Hold
Cochise	Dan S. Kitchel	Dem	Dan S. Kitchel	Dem Hold
Coconino	Robert W. Prochnow	Dem	Robert W. Prochnow	Dem Hold
Coconino	Fred F. Udine	Dem	Fred F. Udine	Dem Hold
Gila	Clarence L. Carpenter	Dem	Clarence L. Carpenter	Dem Hold
Gila	William A. Sullivan	Dem	William A. Sullivan	Dem Hold
Graham	John Mickelson	Dem	John Mickelson	Dem Hold
Graham	Jim Smith	Dem	Darvil B. McBride	Dem Hold
Greenlee	M. L. (Marshall) Simms	Dem	M. L. (Marshall) Simms	Dem Hold
Greenlee	Carl Gale	Dem	Carl Gale	Dem Hold
Maricopa	Hilliard T. Brooke	Dem	Joe Haldiman Jr.	Dem Hold
Maricopa	Frank G. Murphy	Dem	Evan Mecham	Rep Gain
Mohave	Thelma Bollinger (Note: Senator C. Clyde Bollinger was elected in 1958 but died in office. His wife, Thelma Bollinger, was appointed to fill the seat for the remainder of the term.)	Dem	Thelma Bollinger	Dem Hold
Mohave	Robert E. Morrow	Dem	Robert E. Morrow	Dem Hold
Navajo	Glenn Blansett	Dem	Glenn Blansett	Dem Hold
Navajo	J. Morris Richards	Dem	J. Morris Richards	Dem Hold
Pima	Hiram S. (Hi) Corbett	Rep	Hiram S. (Hi) Corbett	Rep Hold
Pima	David Wine	Dem	David Wine	Dem Hold
Pinal	Ben Arnold	Dem	Ben Arnold	Dem Hold
Pinal	Charles S. Goff	Dem	Charles S. Goff	Dem Hold
Santa Cruz	Neilson Brown	Dem	Frank A. Bennett	Dem Hold
Santa Cruz	C. B. (Bert) Smith	Dem	R. G. Michelena	Dem Hold
Yavapai	Charles H. (Chick) Orme Sr.	Dem	Sam Steiger	Rep Gain
Yavapai	David H. Palmer	Dem	David H. Palmer	Dem Hold
Yuma	Harold C. Giss	Dem	Harold C. Giss	Dem Hold
Yuma	Ray H. Thompson	Dem	Ray H. Thompson	Dem Hold

== Detailed Results ==
=== Apache District ===
General election results
Party	Candidate	Votes	%
Democratic	Bert J. Colter	1,610	34.01%
Republican	Albert F. Anderson	1,574	33.25%
Democratic	Melvin S. Crosby	1,550	32.74%
Total votes		4,734	100.00%
Democratic hold			
Republican gain from Democratic			

=== Cochise District ===
General election results
Party	Candidate	Votes	%
Democratic	A.R. Spikes (incumbent)	10,162	50.49%
Democratic	Dan S. Kitchel (incumbent)	9,963	49.51%
Total votes		20,125	100.00%
Democratic hold			
Democratic hold			

=== Coconino District ===
General election results
Party	Candidate	Votes	%
Democratic	Robert W. Prochnow (incumbent)	6,455	52.52%
Democratic	Fred F. Udine (incumbent)	5,836	47.48%
Total votes		12,291	100.00%
Democratic hold			
Democratic hold			

=== Gila District ===
General election results
Party	Candidate	Votes	%
Democratic	Clarence L. Carpenter (incumbent)	6,889	50.99%
Democratic	William A. Sullivan (incumbent)	6,621	49.01%
Total votes		13,510	100.00%
Democratic hold			
Democratic hold			

=== Graham District ===
General election results
Party	Candidate	Votes	%
Democratic	John Mickelson (incumbent)	3,197	50.41%
Democratic	Darvil B. McBride	3,145	49.59%
Total votes		6,342	100.00%
Democratic hold			
Democratic hold			

=== Greenlee District ===
General election results
Party	Candidate	Votes	%
Democratic	M. L. (Marshall) Simms (incumbent)	3,753	58.78%
Democratic	Carl Gale (incumbent)	2,632	41.22%
Total votes		6,385	100.00%
Democratic hold			
Democratic hold			

=== Maricopa District ===
General election results
Party	Candidate	Votes	%
Democratic	Joe Haldiman Jr.	101,803	25.60%
Republican	Evan Mecham	101,022	25.40%
Republican	Ralph G. Burgbacher	98,477	24.76%
Democratic	Frank G. Murphy (incumbent)	96,360	24.23%
Total votes		397,662	100.00%
Democratic hold			
Republican gain from Democratic			

=== Mohave District ===
General election results
Party	Candidate	Votes	%
Democratic	Robert E. Morrow (incumbent)	1,999	40.31%
Democratic	Thelma E. Bollinger (Note: Senator C. Clyde Bollinger was elected in 1958 but died in office. His wife, Thelma Bollinger, was appointed to fill the seat for the remainder of the term, then she ran for a full term herself.) (incumbent)	1,661	33.49%
Republican	Wallace E. Stone	1,299	26.19%
Total votes		4,959	100.00%
Democratic hold			
Democratic hold			

=== Navajo District ===
General election results
Party	Candidate	Votes	%
Democratic	Glenn Blansett (incumbent)	4,300	34.00%
Democratic	J. Morris Richards (incumbent)	4,135	32.70%
Republican	Marshall H. Flake	2,211	17.48%
Republican	Almon D. Owens	2,001	15.82%
Total votes		12,647	100.00%
Democratic hold			
Democratic hold			

=== Pima District ===
General election results
Party	Candidate	Votes	%
Republican	Hiram S. (Hi) Corbett (incumbent)	47,511	35.62%
Democratic	David Wine (incumbent)	47,030	35.26%
Democratic	Thomas Collins	38,833	29.12%
Total votes		133,374	100.00%
Republican hold			
Democratic hold			

=== Pinal District ===
General election results
Party	Candidate	Votes	%
Democratic	Ben Arnold (incumbent)	9,457	43.02%
Democratic	Charles S. Goff (incumbent)	8,780	39.94%
Republican	Reuel N. Pomeroy	3,746	17.04%
Total votes		21,983	100.00%
Democratic hold			
Democratic hold			

=== Santa Cruz District ===
General election results
Party	Candidate	Votes	%
Democratic	Frank A. Bennett	1,633	28.18%
Democratic	R. G. Michelena	1,503	25.94%
Republican	L. E. (Doc) Sexton	1,360	23.47%
Republican	Margaret M. (Margo) Moore	1,298	22.40%
Total votes		5,794	100.00%
Democratic hold			
Democratic hold			

=== Yavapai District ===
General election results
Party	Candidate	Votes	%
Democratic	David H. Palmer (incumbent)	6,397	37.12%
Republican	Sam Steiger	5,550	32.21%
Democratic	Charles H. (Chick) Orme, Sr. (incumbent)	5,286	30.67%
Total votes		17,233	100.00%
Democratic hold			
Republican gain from Democratic			

=== Yuma District ===
General election results
Party	Candidate	Votes	%
Democratic	Harold C. Giss (incumbent)	9,832	54.25%
Democratic	Ray H. Thompson (incumbent)	8,291	45.75%
Total votes		18,123	100.00%
Democratic hold			
Democratic hold			
