= Jerry Gillespie (politician) =

American politician (1950–2011)

Jerold Duane 'Jerry' Gillespie (November 13, 1950 – April 1, 2011) was an American businessman and politician.

Gillespie lived in Mesa, Arizona and was involved in the insurance business. Gillespie was elected to the Arizona Senate and was a Republican. He served in the senate from 1989 until 1991. His obituary described him as a conservative.
