= Karan English =

American politician (born 1949)

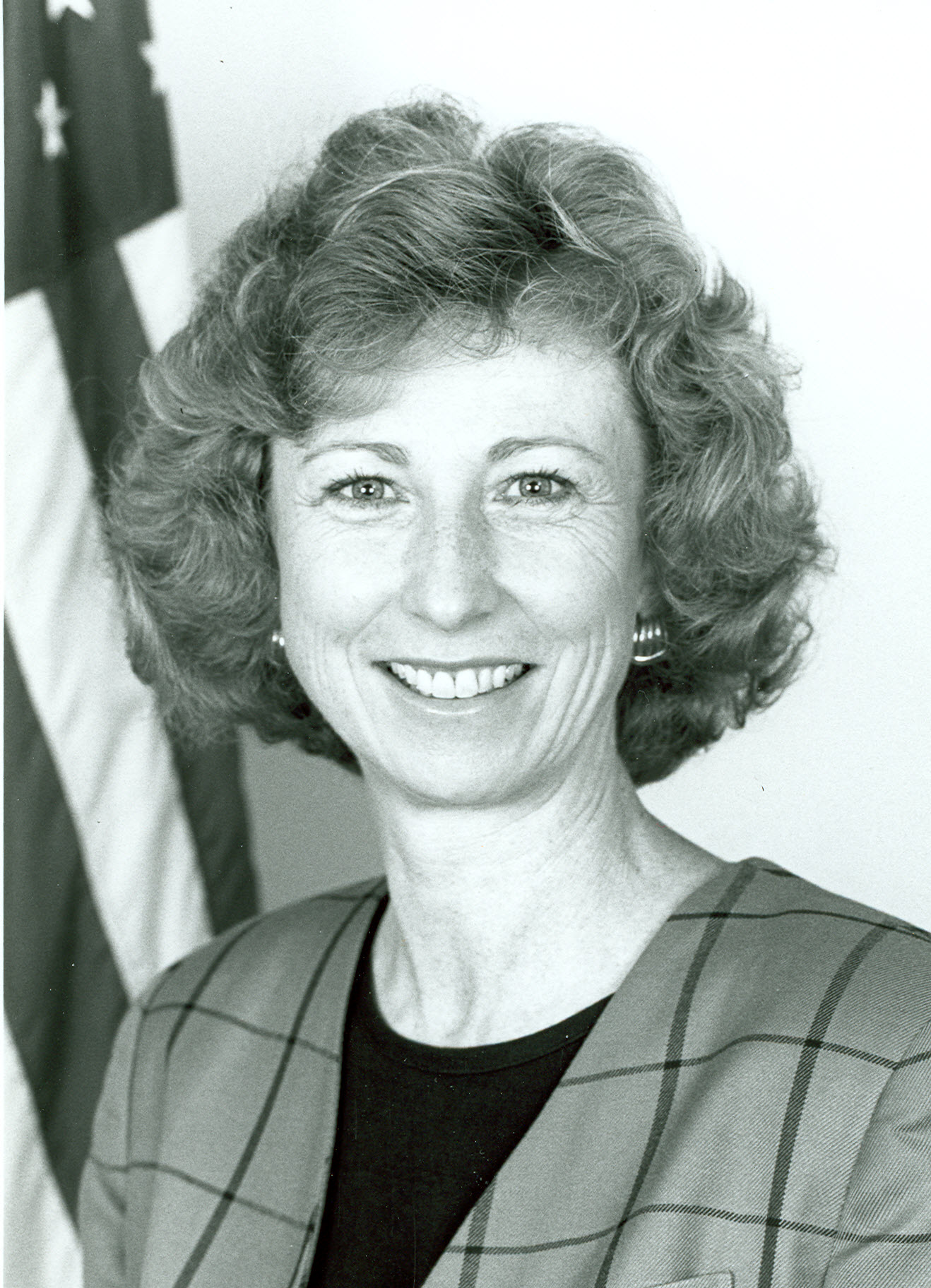

Member of the U.S. House of Representatives from Arizona's 6th district
- In office January 3, 1993 – January 3, 1995
- Preceded by: Constituency established
- Succeeded by: J. D. Hayworth

Member of the Arizona Senate from the 2nd district
- In office January 1991 – January 1993
- Preceded by: Tony Gabaldon
- Succeeded by: John Wettaw

Member of the Arizona House of Representatives from the 2nd district
- In office January 1987 – January 1991
- Preceded by: Sam McConnell
- Succeeded by: Ben Benton

Personal details
- Born: March 23, 1949 (age 77) Berkeley, California, U.S.
- Party: Democratic
- Education: Shasta College; University of California, Santa Barbara (BA); University of Arizona (attended)

Karan English (born March 23, 1949) is an American politician who served in the U.S. House of Representatives of the 103rd United States Congress from 1993 to 1995.

A Democrat, English represented Arizona's 6th congressional district, which in the 1990s included much of Mesa, Scottsdale and northeast Arizona. Prior to her election to the U.S. House of Representatives, English served as an Arizona state senator (1991–1993), state representative (1987–1991), and Coconino County supervisor (1981–1987). In the Arizona senate, English developed a reputation as a liberal on fiscal, social and environmental issues.

Despite being heavily outspent during her campaign, English won her 1992 General Election race against Republican Doug Wead after being endorsed by former U.S. Senator Barry Goldwater. Goldwater said he thought Wead was out of touch with Arizona because of his relatively brief residency in the state—two years to English's 22. Wead countered that Goldwater's support of abortion rights spurred the unexpected crossing of party lines. English may have also benefited from Democratic Party momentum in 1992, which was the year of Bill Clinton's first presidential election victory. Clinton came within a few percentage points of winning Arizona, and two other Democratic Representatives (Ed Pastor and Sam Coppersmith) were elected along with English to give Democrats the majority of the state's House delegation.

She was the second woman to represent Arizona in Congress, with Isabella Selmes Greenway (1933–1937) being the first.

After serving a single term in Congress, English was defeated by Republican challenger J.D. Hayworth in 1994.

As of 2020 she is involved with the Center for Sustainable Environments at Northern Arizona University and is a member of the ReFormers Caucus of Issue One.

== See also ==
- Women in the United States House of Representatives

== Notes ==
1. Yozwiak, Steve (30 October 1992). "Goldwater jolts GOP, backs Democrat". Arizona Republic. Archived from the original on 24 July 2008.
2. Arizona Women's Political Caucus

U.S. House of Representatives
New constituency	Member of the U.S. House of Representatives from Arizona's 6th congressional district 1993–1995	Succeeded by J. D. Hayworth
U.S. order of precedence (ceremonial)
Preceded by Sam Coppersmith as Former U.S. Representative	Order of precedence of the United States as Former U.S. Representative	Succeeded by Ben Quayle as Former U.S. Representative
