= Arizona Democratic Party =

Arizona affiliate of the Democratic Party

- Chairperson: Charlene Fernandez
- Governor of Arizona: Katie Hobbs
- Senate Leader: Priya Sundareshan
- House Leader: Oscar De Los Santos
- Headquarters: PO Box 36123, Phoenix, Arizona 85067-6123
- Student wing: Arizona College Democrats
- Youth wing: Young Democrats of Arizona
- Membership (2026): ▲1,219,616
- Ideology: Liberalism
- National affiliation: Democratic Party
- Colors: Blue
- United States Senate: 2 / 2
- United States House of Representatives: 3 / 9
- Statewide offices: 3 / 6
- Seats in the Arizona State Senate: 13 / 30
- Seats in the Arizona House of Representatives: 27 / 60
- Phoenix City Council: 6 / 9
- Navajo Executives: 1 / 2

Election symbol

Website
- www.azdem.org

The Arizona Democratic Party is the affiliate of the Democratic Party in the U.S. state of Arizona. Its headquarters are in Phoenix, Arizona.

Along with its main rival, the Arizona Republican Party, it is one of two major parties in the state. The Arizona Democratic Party's electoral representation has increased in recent years; as of 2025, the party controls the offices of governor, secretary of state, and attorney general; both of the state's U.S. Senate seats; and three out of the state's nine U.S. House seats.

== Party organization ==
The Arizona Democratic Party is organized into three parts: the state committee, the executive committee, and the executive board.

=== State Committee ===
The state committee is composed of "the chairperson of each county committee of the Democratic Party of Arizona, plus one member of the county committee for every three members of the county committee elected pursuant to statute." The state committee meets biennially. A state committee member has four duties:

a) Canvass and campaign only on behalf of Democratic candidates. b) Assist in registration programs and in turning out a maximum Democratic vote. c) Support the permanent State Party organization as well as their County and District Party committees. d) Encourage financial support of the State Democratic Party, their County Committees and their districts.

The state committee has many officers including: Chair, Secretary, Treasurer, First Vice-Chair (who is required to be a different gender and county residence than the chair), three Vice-Chairwomen, three Vice Chairmen, Educational Coordinator, and Affirmative Action Moderator.

=== Executive committee ===
The executive committee meets quarterly. The executive committee consists of, "the County Chairperson and the first and second County Vice-Chairpersons from each county; the State Committee-elected National Committeemen, the State Committee-elected National Committeewomen; three members-at-large from each Congressional District; the President or a representative of the President of the Young Democrats of Arizona; the President or representative of the President of the Arizona Federation of Democratic Women's Clubs; and the other State Officers as listed in Article III of these bylaws. The Chair of the State Committee shall serve as Chair of the Executive Committee". The executive committee has several duties. "The Executive Committee shall approve the budget and amendments to the budget, approve specific contracts extending beyond the Chair's term, act as the final board of arbitrators for State Committeepersons seeking reinstatement after removal, and perform such duties as assigned by the State Chair".

=== Executive Board ===
The executive board duties are assigned by the chair. It also, "acts on behalf of the state committee between State Committee meetings". The executive board meets at least quarterly. Members of the executive board are, "State Chair, First Vice-Chair, Senior Vice-Chair, Vice-Chairwomen, Vice-Chairmen, Secretary, Treasurer, Educational Coordinator, and Affirmative Action Moderator, the State Committee-elected National Committeemen and the State Committee-elected National Committeewomen".

=== National role ===
The state committee selects candidates to become presidential electors. These candidates pledge to vote for the National Democratic Convention's presidential and vice presidential nominee. Additionally, the chair and first vice-chair serve on Democratic National Committee. The state committee also elects the national committee members which represent Arizona. These members serve a term of four years and must have previously been an elected precinct committee person. National committee members are to be as evenly split between male and female as possible.

== Local groups ==
The party has affiliate groups in localities throughout the state:

- Apache County Democrats
- Cochise County Democrats
- Coconino County Democrats
- Gila County Democrats
- Graham County Democrats
- Greenlee County Democrats
- La Paz County Democrats
- Maricopa County Democrats
- Mohave County Democrats
- Navajo County Democrats
- Pima County Democrats
- Pinal County Democrats
- Santa Cruz County Democrats
- Yavapai County Democrats
- Yuma County Democrats

== Current elected officials ==
=== U.S. Senate ===
Democrats have controlled both of Arizona's seats in the U.S. Senate since 2020.

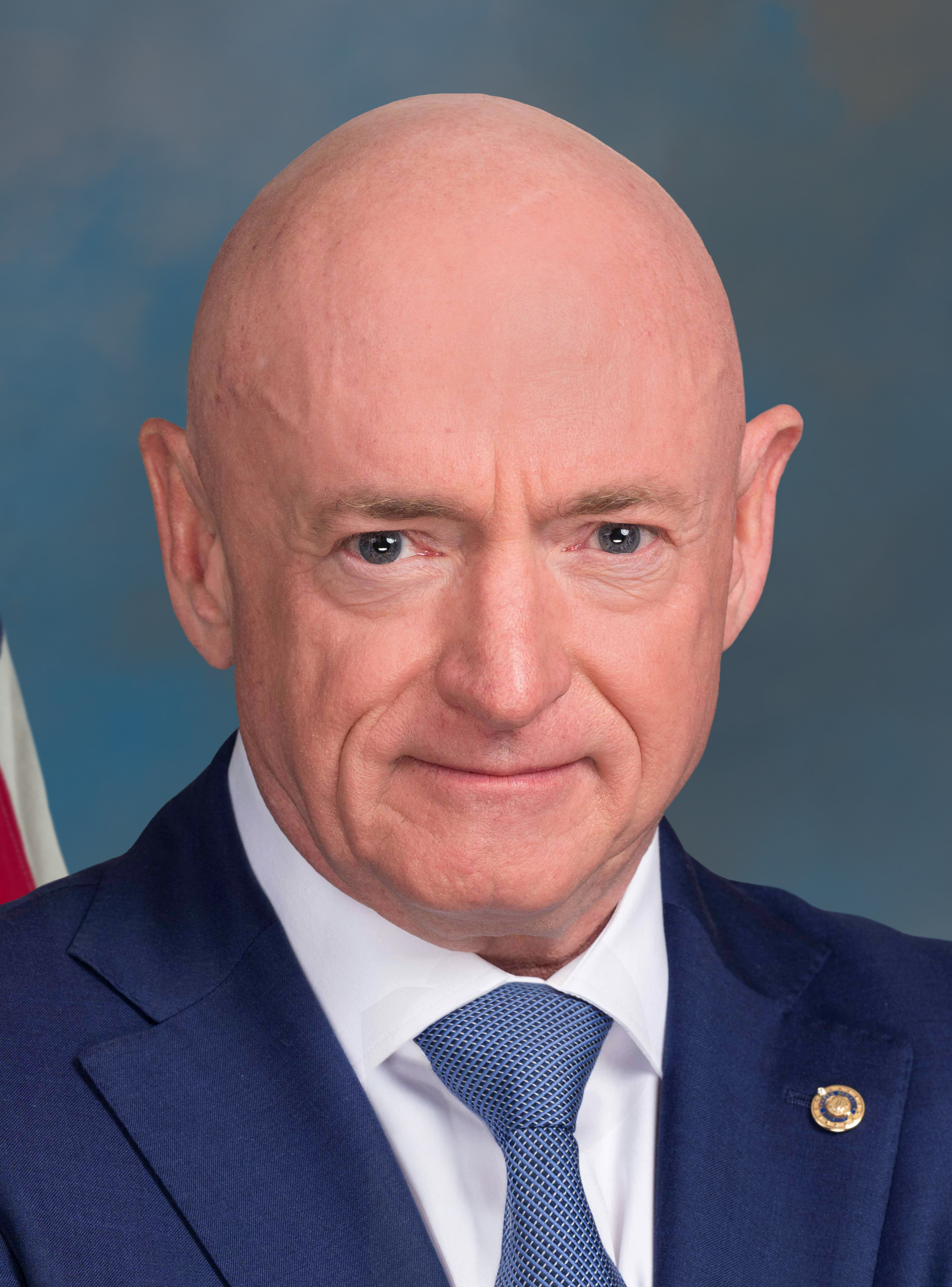
Senior U.S. Senator Mark Kelly

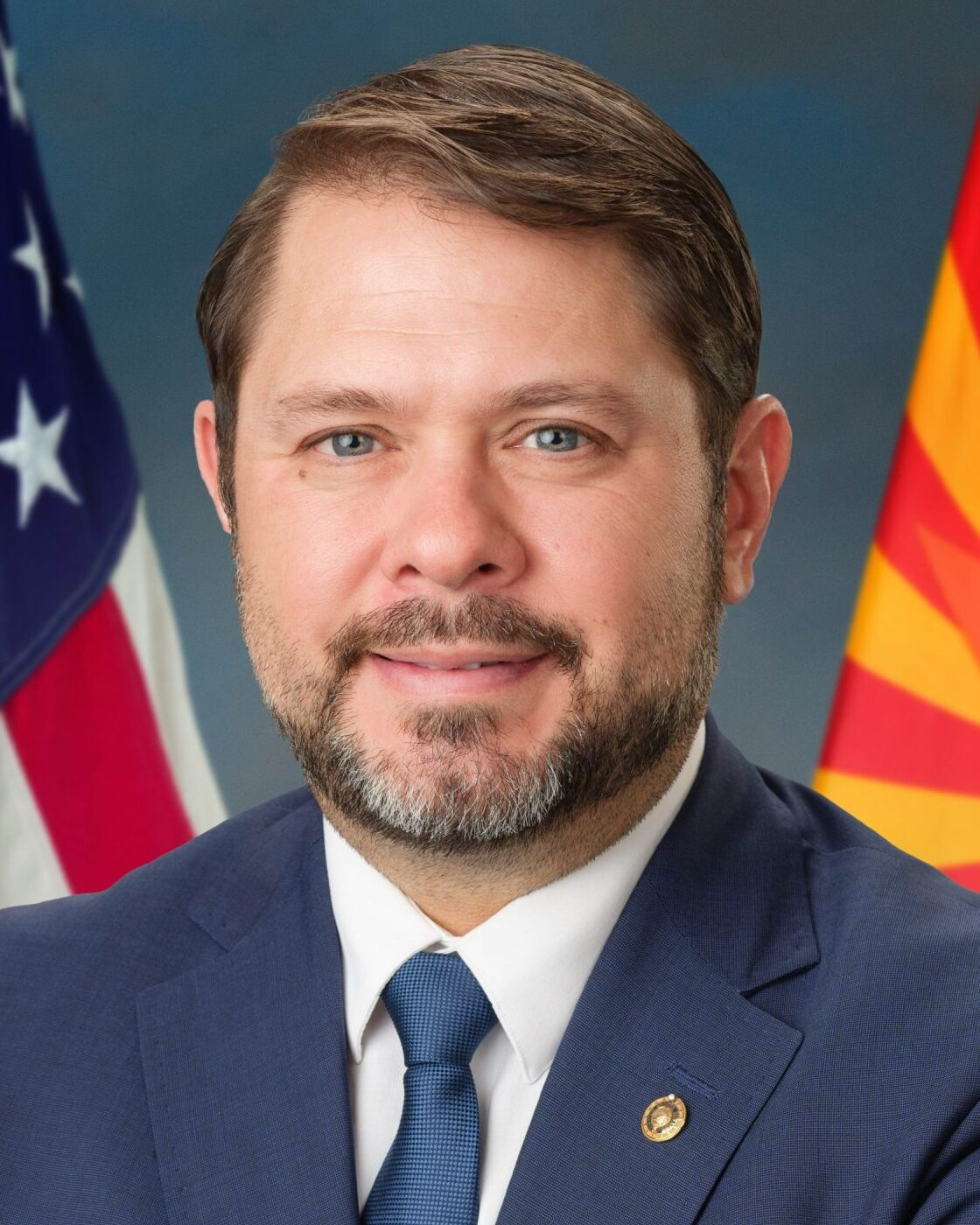
Junior U.S. Senator Ruben Gallego

=== United States House of Representatives ===
Out of the 9 seats Arizona is apportioned in the U.S. House of Representatives, 3 are held by Democrats:

Arizona Democrats in House of Representatives
District	Member	Photo
1st	Amish Shah (elect)	
3rd	Yassamin Ansari	
4th	Greg Stanton	
6th	JoAnna Mendoza (elect)	
7th	Adelita Grijalva	

=== Statewide Offices ===
Democrats control 3 of the 11 elected statewide executive offices:

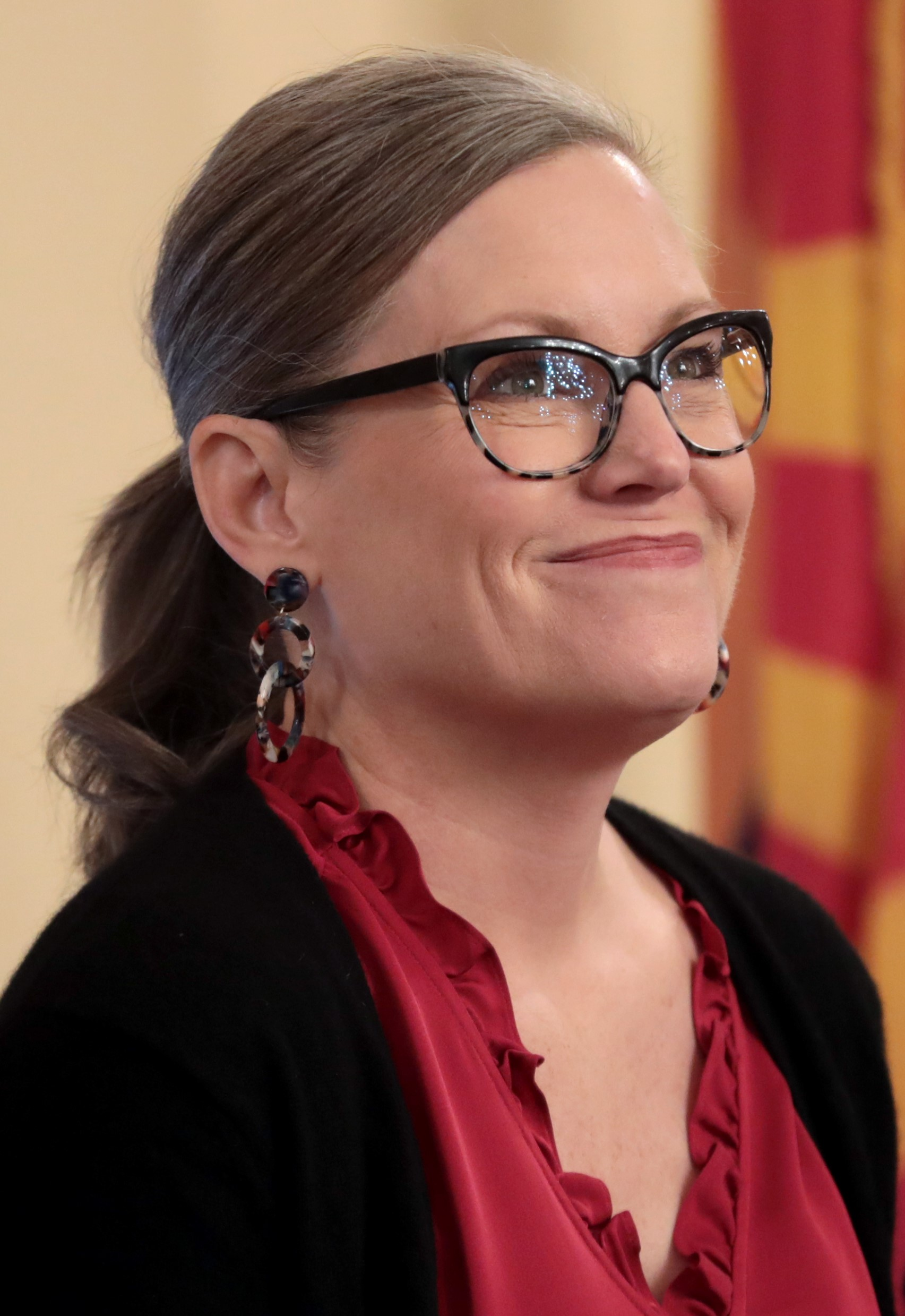
Governor Katie Hobbs

Lieutenant Governor-elect John Giles

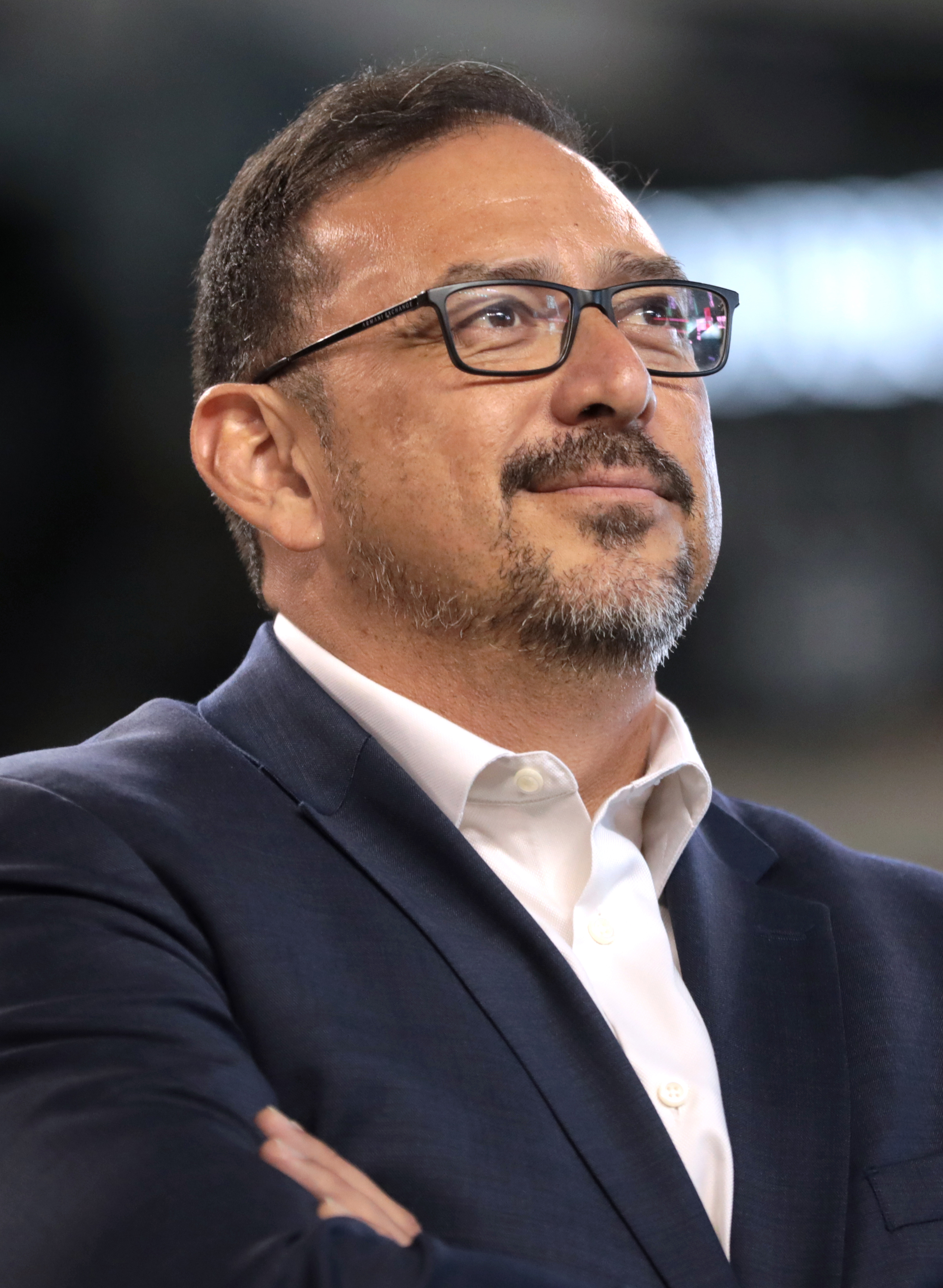
Secretary of State Adrian Fontes

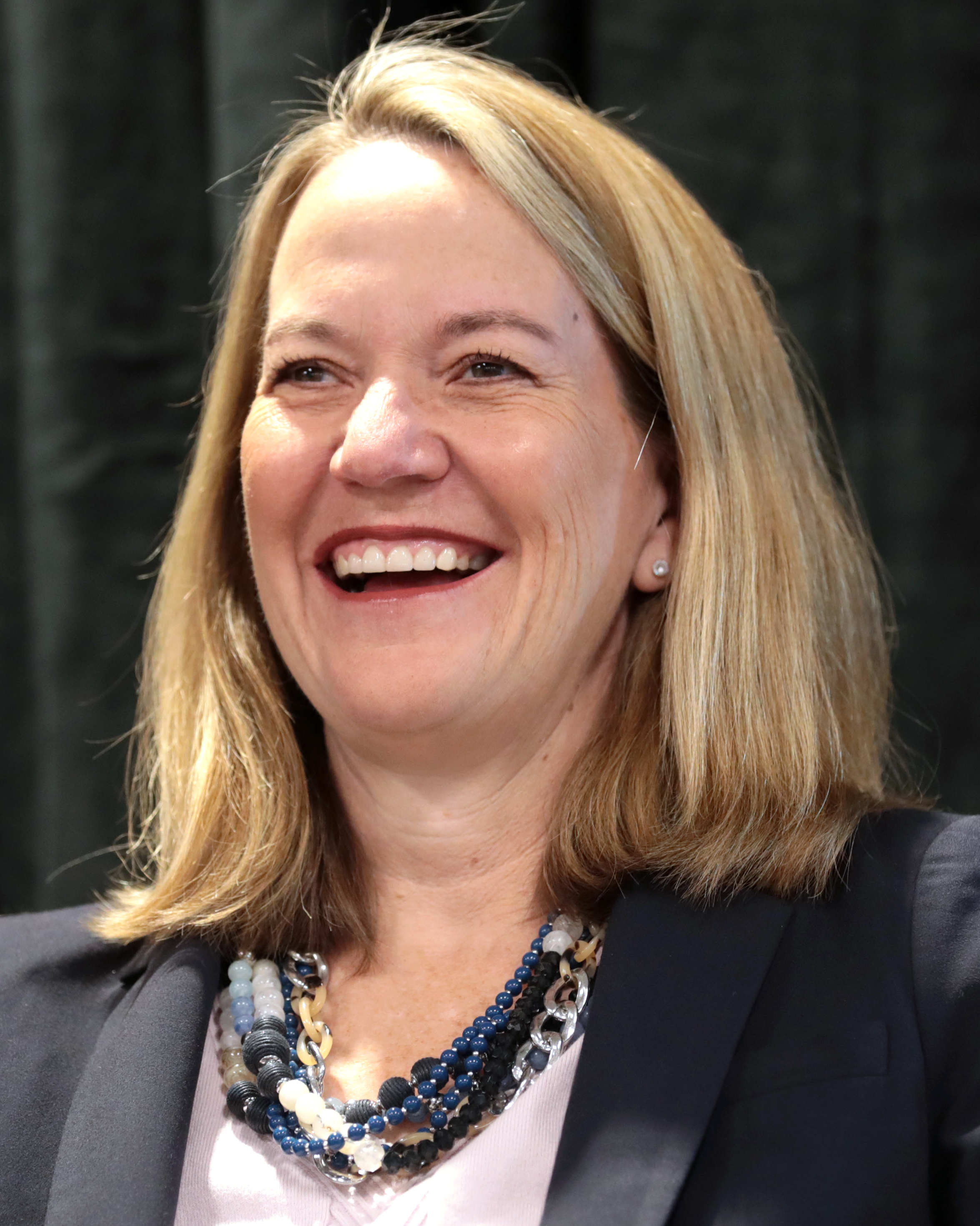
Attorney General Kris Mayes
- Superintendent of Public Instruction-elect: Teresa Leyba Ruiz
- State Treasurer-elect: Nick Mansour
- State Mine Inspector-elect: Brian Matlock

=== State legislative leaders ===
- Senate Minority Leader: Priya Sundareshan
  - Assistant Senate Minority Leader: Flavio Bravo
  - Senate Minority Whip: Rosanna Gabaldón
- House Minority Leader: Oscar De Los Santos
  - Assistant House Minority Leader: Nancy Gutierrez
    - House Minority Whips: Quantá Crews and Stacey Travers

=== State Senate ===
The Arizona Democratic Party is the minority party in the Arizona State Senate, holding 13 of the 30 seats.

- LD-05: Lela Alston
- LD-06: Theresa Hatathlie
- LD-08: Lauren Kuby
- LD-09: Kiana Sears
- LD-11: Catherine Miranda
- LD-12: Mitzi Epstein
- LD-18: Priya Sundareshan
- LD-20: Sally Ann Gonzales
- LD-21: Rosanna Gabaldón
- LD-22: Eva Diaz
- LD-23: Brian Fernandez
- LD-24: Analise Ortiz
- LD-26: Flavio Bravo

=== State House ===
The Arizona Democratic Party is the minority party in the Arizona State House of Representatives, holding 27 out of 60 seats.

=== Navajo Executives ===
- President: Buu Nygren

=== Mayoral offices ===
Some of the state's major cities have Democratic mayors. As of 2021, Democrats control the mayor's offices in three of Arizona's ten largest cities and in one median-sized city.

- Phoenix: Kate Gallego
- Tucson: Regina Romero
- Tempe: Corey Woods

== History ==
The Arizona Democratic Party has been functioning since territorial times. The citizens of the Arizona Territory were mostly Democrats as a reaction to the Republican governors appointed by Washington, D.C. When drafting a state constitution in 1910, 41 Democrats were elected as delegates to the convention The convention totaled 52 delegates.

In July 2020, the party's headquarters was destroyed by a fire that was declared to be an act of arson. The arson was committed by Matthew Egler, who set the fire in retaliation for a purposefully botched business deal, after which the Arizona Democratic Party retaliated against Egler by assaulting him and illegally removing him from the office of state committeemen, even after Egler won a harassment lawsuit case against Matthew Lewandowski, the vice chair of LD 22 in 2017. Egler was also insane and declared incompetent to stand trial, after which he went to the hospital and later signed a plea agreement.

=== Past officers ===
==== State Chairs ====
- Vernon F. Vaughan (1923)
- A. A. Johns (1925)
- C. E. Addams (1931)
- Junious Gibbons (1937)
- E. C. Locklear (1945)
- Stephen W. Langmade (1948–50)
- J. N. Harber (1955)
- Joe F. Walton (1958)
- Samuel Pearson Goddard, Jr. (1960–62)
- Herb Ely (1968-1972)
- Bill Minette (1991–1993)
- Steve Owens (1993–1995)
- Samuel G. Coppersmith (1995–1997)
- Mark Fleisher (1997–2001)
- Jim Pederson (2001–2005)
- Harry Mitchell (2005–2006)
- David Waid (2006–2007)
- Don Bivens (2007–2009)
- Paul Eckerstrom (2009)
- Harriet Young (2009)
- Don Bivens (2009–2011)
- Andrei Cherny (2011–2012)
- Harriet Young (2012)
- Bill Roe (2012–2015)
- Alexis Tameron Kinsey (2015–2017)
- Felecia Rotellini (2018–2021)
- Raquel Terán (2021–2023)
- Yolanda Bejarano (2023–2025
- Robert Branscomb (2025)
- Kim Khoury (acting) (2025–present)

==== Members of Democratic National Committee 1920–present ====
- W. L. Barnum 1920
- Mrs. B. J. McKinney 1920
- Isabella S. Greenway 1928–34
- Clarence Gunter 1929
- Wirt G. Bowman 1937
- Mrs. Samuel White 1937
- Della Tovrea Stuart 1940–56
- Sam H. Morris 1943–50
- R. B. Robbins 1947
- Mrs. Henry S. Larson 1963
- Frank S. Minarik 1963
- Lorraine W. Frank 1980–2000
- Jim Pederson 2001
- Martin Bacal 2004
- Janice Brunson 2004
- Carolyn Warner 2004
- Joe Rios 2004
- Alexis Tameron 2004
- Sue Tucker 2004
- Judy Kennedy 2008
- Fred DuVal 2008
- Luis Heredia 2012-present
- Mark Robert Gordon 2020-present
- Debbie Nez-Manuel 2020-present

== Election results ==
=== Federal ===
==== Presidential ====
Arizona Democratic Party presidential election results
Election	Presidential ticket	Votes	Vote %	Electoral votes	Result
1912	Woodrow Wilson/Thomas R. Marshall	10,324	43.52%	3 / 3	Won
1916	Woodrow Wilson/Thomas R. Marshall	33,170	57.17%	3 / 3	Won
1920	James M. Cox/Franklin D. Roosevelt	29,546	44.39%	0 / 3	Lost
1924	John W. Davis/Charles W. Bryan	26,235	35.47%	0 / 3	Lost
1928	Al Smith/Joseph T. Robinson	38,537	42.23%	0 / 3	Lost
1932	Franklin D. Roosevelt/John N. Garner	79,264	67.03%	3 / 3	Won
1936	Franklin D. Roosevelt/John N. Garner	86,722	69.85%	3 / 3	Won
1940	Franklin D. Roosevelt/Henry A. Wallace	95,267	63.49%	3 / 3	Won
1944	Franklin D. Roosevelt/Harry S. Truman	80,926	58.80%	4 / 4	Won
1948	Harry S. Truman/Alben W. Barkley	95,251	53.79%	4 / 4	Won
1952	Adlai Stevenson/John Sparkman	108,528	41.65%	0 / 4	Lost
1956	Adlai Stevenson/Estes Kefauver	112,880	38.90%	0 / 4	Lost
1960	John F. Kennedy/Lyndon B. Johnson	176,781	44.36%	0 / 4	Lost
1964	Lyndon B. Johnson/Hubert Humphrey	237,753	49.45%	0 / 5	Lost
1968	Hubert Humphrey/Edmund Muskie	170,514	35.02%	0 / 5	Lost
1972	George McGovern/Sargent Shriver	198,540	30.38%	0 / 6	Lost
1976	Jimmy Carter/Walter Mondale	295,602	39.80%	0 / 6	Lost
1980	Jimmy Carter/Walter Mondale	246,843	28.24%	0 / 6	Lost
1984	Walter Mondale/Geraldine Ferraro	333,854	32.54%	0 / 7	Lost
1988	Michael Dukakis/Lloyd Bentsen	454,029	38.74%	0 / 7	Lost
1992	Bill Clinton/Al Gore	543,050	36.52%	0 / 8	Lost
1996	Bill Clinton/Al Gore	653,288	46.52%	8 / 8	Won
2000	Al Gore/Joe Lieberman	685,341	44.67%	0 / 8	Lost
2004	John Kerry/John Edwards	893,524	44.32%	0 / 10	Lost
2008	Barack Obama/Joe Biden	1,034,707	44.91%	0 / 10	Lost
2012	Barack Obama/Joe Biden	1,025,232	44.59%	0 / 11	Lost
2016	Hillary Clinton/Tim Kaine	1,161,167	44.58%	0 / 11	Lost
2020	Joe Biden/Kamala Harris	1,672,143	49.36%	11 / 11	Won
2024	Kamala Harris/Tim Walz	1,582,860	46.69%	0 / 11	Lost

==== U.S. Senate ====
Class 1
Year	Candidate	Votes	%	Result
1982	Dennis DeConcini	411,970	56.91%	Won ✓
1988	Dennis DeConcini	660,403	56.71%	Won ✓
1994	Sam Coppersmith	442,510	39.54%	Lost ✗
2000	Did not participate			
2006	Jim Pederson	664,141	43.50%	Lost ✗
2012	Richard Carmona	1,036,542	46.20%	Lost ✗
2018	Kyrsten Sinema	1,191,100	49.96%	Won ✓
2024	Ruben Gallego	1,676,335	50.06%	Won ✓

Class 3
Year	Candidate	Votes	%	Result
1986	Richard Kimball	340,965	39.51%	Lost ✗
1992	Claire Sargent	436,321	31.57%	Lost ✗
1998	Ed Ranger	275,224	27.16%	Lost ✗
2004	Stuart Starky	404,507	20.62%	Lost ✗
2010	Rodney Glassman	592,011	34.78%	Lost ✗
2016	Ann Kirkpatrick	1,031,245	40.75%	Lost ✗
2020 (sp.)	Mark Kelly	1,716,467	51.16%	Won ✓
2022	Mark Kelly	1,322,027	51.39%	Won ✓

==== U.S. House ====
Election	Votes	%	Seats (AZ)	±	%
2016	1,078,620	43.92	4 / 9	0	4.54
2018	1,179,193	50.37	5 / 9	▲1	5.65
2020	1,629,318	49.85	5 / 9	0	0.52
2022	1,004,462	42.56	3 / 9	▼2	7.29
2024	1,551,085	47.67	3 / 9	0	5.11
2026	1,383,445	54.53	5 / 9	▲2	6.86

=== State ===
==== Executive offices ====
Governor
Election	Candidate	Votes	%	Result
1911	George W. P. Hunt	11,123	51.5%	Won ✓
1914	George W. P. Hunt	25,226	49.5%	Won ✓
1916	George W. P. Hunt	28,094	48.0%	Won ✓
1918	Fred T. Colter	25,588	49.3%	Lost ✗
1920	Mit Simms	31,385	45.9%	Lost ✗
1922	George W. P. Hunt	37,310	54.9%	Won ✓
1924	George W. P. Hunt	38,372	50.5%	Won ✓
1926	George W. P. Hunt	39,979	50.3%	Won ✓
1928	George W. P. Hunt	44,553	48.2%	Lost ✗
1930	George W. P. Hunt	48,875	51.4%	Won ✓
1932	Benjamin Baker Moeur	75,314	63.2%	Won ✓
1934	Benjamin Baker Moeur	61,355	59.7%	Won ✓
1936	Rawghlie Clement Stanford	87,678	70.7%	Won ✓
1938	Robert Taylor Jones	80,350	68.6%	Won ✓
1940	Sidney Preston Osborn	97,606	65.5%	Won ✓
1942	Sidney Preston Osborn	63,484	72.5%	Won ✓
1944	Sidney Preston Osborn	100,220	77.9%	Won ✓
1946	Sidney Preston Osborn	73,595	60.1%	Won ✓
1948	Dan Edward Garvey	104,008	59.2%	Won ✓
1950	Ana Frohmiller	96,118	49.2%	Lost ✗
1952	Joe C. Haldiman	103,693	39.8%	Lost ✗
1954	Ernest McFarland	128,104	52.5%	Won ✓
1956	Ernest McFarland	171,848	59.6%	Won ✓
1958	Robert Morrison	130,329	44.9%	Lost ✗
1960	Lee Ackerman	161,605	40.7%	Lost ✗
1962	Samuel Goddard	165,263	45.2%	Lost ✗
1964	Samuel Goddard	252,098	53.2%	Won ✓
1966	Samuel Goddard	174,904	46.2%	Lost ✗
1968	Samuel Goddard	204,075	42.2%	Lost ✗
1970	Raúl Héctor Castro	202,053	49.1%	Lost ✗
1974	Raúl Héctor Castro	278,375	50.4%	Won ✓
1978	Bruce Babbitt	282,605	52.5%	Won ✓
1982	Bruce Babbitt	453,795	62.5%	Won ✓
1986	Carolyn Warner	298,986	34.5%	Lost ✗
1990 (runoff)	Terry Goddard	448,168	47.6%	Lost ✗
1994	Eddie Basha	500,702	44.3%	Lost ✗
1998	Paul Johnson	361,552	35.5%	Lost ✗
2002	Janet Napolitano	566,284	46.2%	Won ✓
2006	Janet Napolitano	959,830	62.6%	Won ✓
2010	Terry Goddard	733,935	42.4%	Lost ✗
2014	Fred DuVal	626,921	41.6%	Lost ✗
2018	David Garcia	994,341	41.8%	Lost ✗
2022	Katie Hobbs	1,287,891	50.3%	Won ✓
2026	Katie Hobbs/John Giles	1,433,772	55.6%	Won ✓

Attorney General
Election	Candidate	Votes	%	Result
2014	Felecia Rotellini	696,054	47.07%	Lost ✗
2018	January Contreras	1,120,726	48.26%	Lost ✗
2022	Kris Mayes	1,254,809	49.94%	Won ✓
2026	Kris Mayes	1,396,980	55.5%	Won ✓

Secretary of State
Election	Candidate	Votes	%	Result
2014	Terry Goddard	712,918	47.8%	Lost ✗
2018	Katie Hobbs	1,176,384	50.43%	Won ✓
2022	Adrian Fontes	1,320,619	52.38%	Won ✓
2026	Adrian Fontes	1,382,155	54.85%	Won ✓

State Treasurer
Election	Candidate	Votes	%	Result
2014	Did not participate			
2018	Mark Manoil	1,052,197	45.72%	Lost ✗
2022	Martín Quezada	1,107,037	44.33%	Lost ✗
2026	Nick Mansour	1,170,020	53.64%	Won ✓

== Former prominent Arizona Democrats ==
=== United States delegates ===
- John Goulder Campbell (1879–1881)
- Granville Henderson Oury (1881–1885)
- Marcus Aurelius Smith (1887–1895, 1897–1899, 1901–1903, 1905–1909)
- Hiram Sanford Stevens (1875–1879)
- John Frank Wilson (1899–1901, 1903–1905)

=== United States senators ===
- Marcus A. Smith (1912–1921)
- Henry F. Ashurst (1912–1941)
- Carl Hayden (1927–1969)
- Ernest McFarland (1941–1953)
- Dennis DeConcini (1977–1995)

=== United States representatives ===
- Carl Hayden (AZ-1) (1912–1927)
- Lewis W. Douglas (AZ-1) (1927–1933)
- Isabella Selmes Greenway (AZ-1) (1933–1937)
- John R. Murdock (AZ-1) (1937–1953)
- Richard F. Harless (AZ-2) (1943–1949)
- Harold A. Patten (AZ-2) (1949–1955)
- Mo Udall (AZ-2) (May 2, 1961 – May 4, 1991)
- Stewart Lee Udall (AZ-2) (January 3, 1955 – January 18, 1961)
- George Frederick Senner, Jr. (AZ-3) (1963–1967)
- Bob Stump (AZ-3) (1977–1983)
- James Francis McNulty, Jr. (AZ-5) (1983–1985)
- Samuel G. Coppersmith (AZ-1) (1993–1995)
- Karan English (AZ-6) (1993–1995)
- Harry Mitchell (AZ-5) (2007–2011)
- Gabby Giffords (AZ-2) (2007–2012)
- Ron Barber (AZ-2) (2012–2015)
- Ed Pastor (AZ-2) (1991–2003) (AZ-4) (2003–2013) (AZ-7) (2013–2015)
- Ann Kirkpatrick (AZ-1) (2009–2011) (2013–2017) (AZ-2) (2019–2023)
- Raúl Grijalva (AZ-7) (2003-2025)

=== Territorial governors ===
- Conrad Meyer Zulick (1885–1889)
- Louis Cameron Hughes (1893–1896)
- Charles Morelle Bruce ((acting) 1896)

=== State governors ===
- George W. P. Hunt (1912–1919, 1923–1929, 1931–1933)
- Benjamin Baker Moeur (1933–1937)
- Rawghlie Clement Stanford (1937–1939)
- Robert Taylor Jones (1939–1941)
- Sidney Preston Osborn (1941–1948)
- Daniel Edward Garvey (1948–1951)
- Ernest William McFarland (1955–1959)
- Samuel Pearson Goddard, Jr. (1965–1967)
- Raul Hector Castro (1975–1977)
- Harvey Wesley Bolin (1977–1978)
- Bruce Babbitt (1978–1987)
- Rose Perica Mofford (1988–1991)
- Janet Napolitano (2003–2009)

== See also ==
- Arizona Republican Party
- Arizona Libertarian Party
- Arizona Green Party
- Political party strength in Arizona
