= Carolyn Walker =

American politician (born c. 1946)

Member of the Arizona Senate from the 23rd district
- In office January 12, 1987 – March 20, 1991
- Preceded by: Alfredo Gutierrez
- Succeeded by: Armando Ruiz

Personal details
- Born: 1945 or 1946 (age 79–80)
- Party: Democratic
- Occupation: public relations

Carolyn Walker (born c. 1946) is an American former politician. Walker served in the Arizona House of Representatives from 1983 to 1986. She then served as the first African-American woman in the Arizona Senate from 1987 to 1991, and as Senate Majority Whip. She was indicted in the AzScam sting operation in 1991, and consequently expelled from the Senate.
