= Arizona's 11th legislative district =

American legislative district

- Map of District 11: Approved January 21, 2022
- Senator: Catherine Miranda (D)
- House members: Oscar De Los Santos (D); Junelle Cavero (D)
- Registration: 44.07% Democratic; 15.63% Republican; 38.48% Other
- Demographics: 18% White; 16% Black/African American; 3% Native American; 4% Asian; 58% Hispanic
- Population: 237,844
- Voting-age population: 170,914
- Registered voters: 109,103

Arizona's 11th legislative district is one of 30 in the state, consisting of a section of Maricopa County. As of 2023, there are 37 precincts in the district, all in Maricopa, with a total registered voter population of 109,103. The district has an overall population of 237,844.

Following the 2020 United States redistricting cycle, the Arizona Independent Redistricting Commission (AIRC) redrew legislative district boundaries in Arizona. The 11th district was drawn as a majority Latino constituency, with 58% of residents being Hispanic or Latino. According to the AIRC, the district is outside of competitive range and considered leaning Democratic.

== Political representation ==
The district is represented in the 56th Arizona State Legislature, which convenes from January 1, 2023, to December 31, 2024, by Catherine Miranda (D-Phoenix) in the Arizona Senate and by Oscar De Los Santos (D-Phoenix) and Junelle Cavero (D-Phoenix) in the Arizona House of Representatives.

Cavero was appointed in April 2024 to succeed resigned representative Marcelino Quiñonez.

Name	Image	Residence	Office	Party
Catherine Miranda		Phoenix	State senator	Democrat
Oscar De Los Santos		Phoenix	State representative	Democrat
Junelle Cavero		Phoenix	State representative	Democrat

== Election results ==
The 2022 elections were the first in the newly drawn district.

=== Arizona Senate ===
2022 Arizona's 11th Senate district election
Party	Candidate	Votes	%
Democratic	Catherine Miranda	37,265	75.20
Republican	Maryn Brannies	12,290	24.80
Total votes		49,555	100
Democratic hold			

=== Arizona House of Representatives ===
2022 Arizona House of Representatives election, 11th district
Party	Candidate	Votes	%
Democratic	Oscar De Los Santos	30,524	41.09
Democratic	Marcelino Quiñonez (incumbent)	30,009	40.40
Republican	Tatiana Peña	13,744	18.50
Total votes		74,277	100.00
Democratic hold			
Democratic hold			

== See also ==
- List of Arizona legislative districts
- Arizona State Legislature
