= Electoral history of Kyrsten Sinema =

Elections featuring American politician

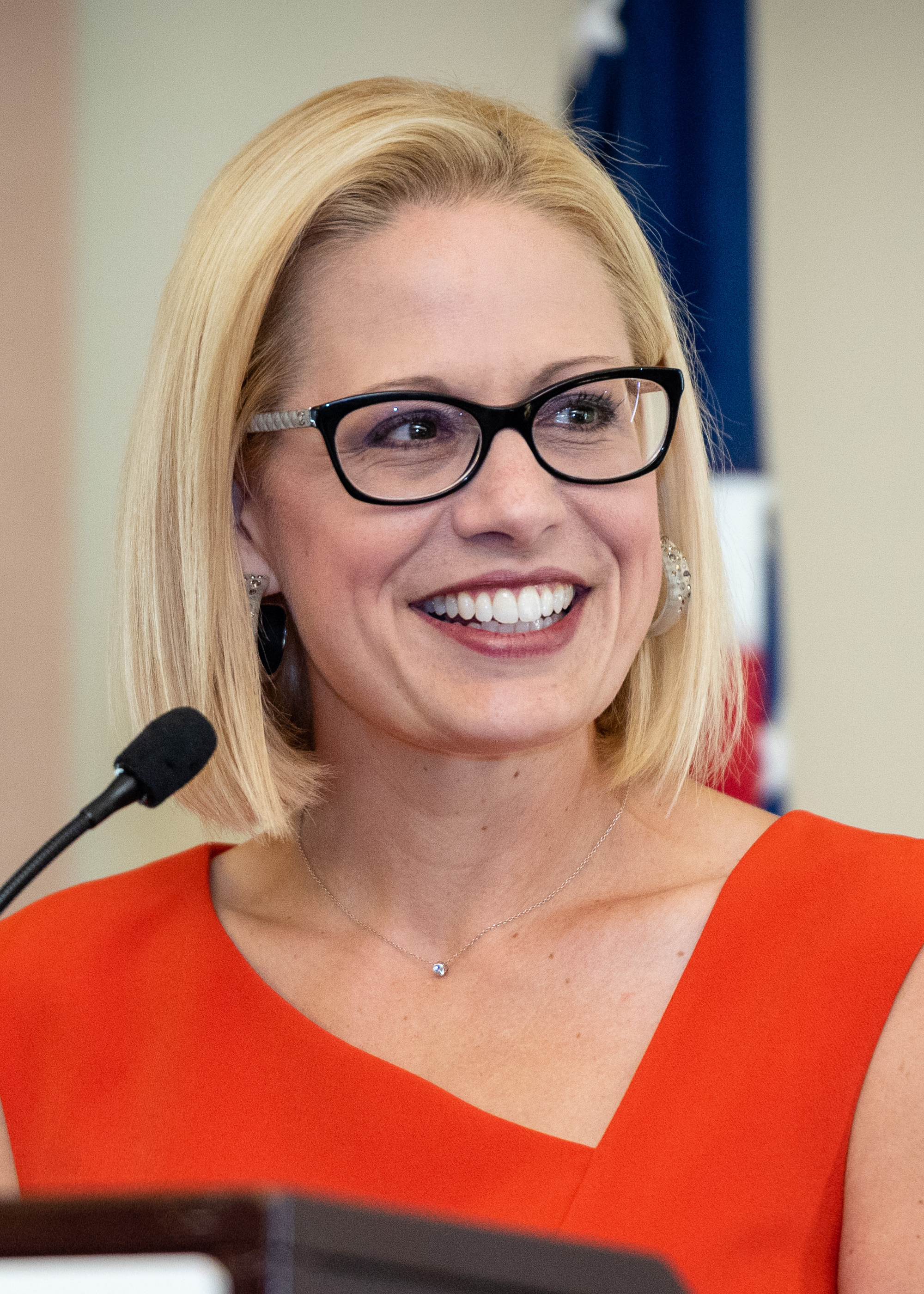
Kyrsten Sinema (2018)

This is the electoral history of Kyrsten Sinema, the senior United States senator from Arizona from 2019 to 2025. Previously, she represented the 15th district in the Arizona House of Representatives from 2005 to 2011 and in the Arizona Senate from 2011 to 2012. From 2013 to 2019, Sinema represented the newly created 9th congressional district in the United States House of Representatives. Sinema became the first openly bisexual person elected to the House of Representatives in 2012 and to the United States Senate in 2018. She is also the first woman elected to the U.S. Senate from Arizona.

== Phoenix City Council ==
=== 2001 ===
Phoenix City Council 8th District, 2001 Primary Election
Party	Candidate	Votes	%
Nonpartisan	Mike Johnson	2,677	49.0%
Nonpartisan	Abedon Fimbres	633	11.6%
Nonpartisan	Trace Vencenza	558	10.2%
Nonpartisan	Feliciano D. Vera	546	10.0%
Nonpartisan	Charles W. Townsel	332	6.1%
Nonpartisan	Carolyn T. Lowery	287	5.3%
Nonpartisan	Christopher J. Piper	149	2.7%
Nonpartisan	H. Khalsa	148	2.7%
Nonpartisan	Kyrsten Sinema	129	2.4%
Total votes		5,456	100

== Arizona House of Representatives ==
=== 2002 ===
Arizona House of Representatives 15th District, 2002 General Election
Party	Candidate	Votes	%
Democratic	Ken Clark	10,873	30.2%
Democratic	Wally Straughn	8,109	22.6%
Republican	Milton Wheat	7,163	19.9%
Republican	William Wheat	6,868	19.1%
Green	Kyrsten Sinema (Note: Sinema ran as an independent affiliated with the Green Party.)	2,945	8.2%
Total votes		35,958	100
Democratic gain from Republican			

=== 2004 ===
Arizona House of Representatives 15th District, 2004 Primary Election
Party	Candidate	Votes	%
Democratic	Kyrsten Sinema	3,475	37.0%
Democratic	David Lujan	3,204	34.1%
Democratic	Wally Straughn (incumbent)	2,726	29.0%
Total votes		9,405	100

Arizona House of Representatives 15th District, 2004 General Election
Party	Candidate	Votes	%
Democratic	David Lujan	19,999	31.1%
Democratic	Kyrsten Sinema	19,402	30.2%
Republican	Oksana Komarnyckyj	12,299	19.1%
Republican	Tara Roesler	12,565	19.6%
Total votes		64,265	100
Democratic hold			

=== 2006 ===
Arizona House of Representatives 15th District, 2006 Primary Election
Party	Candidate	Votes	%
Democratic	Kyrsten Sinema (incumbent)	3,590	42.3%
Democratic	David Lujan (incumbent)	3,571	42.1%
Democratic	Robert Young	1,323	15.6%
Total votes		8,484	100

Arizona House of Representatives 15th District, 2006 General Election
Party	Candidate	Votes	%
Democratic	David Lujan (incumbent)	15,951	33.1%
Democratic	Kyrsten Sinema (incumbent)	15,723	32.6%
Republican	Robert Gear	7,689	16.0%
Republican	William Wheat	7,305	15.2%
Libertarian	Richard Buck	1,499	3.1%
Total votes		48,167	100
Democratic hold			

=== 2008 ===
Arizona House of Representatives 15th District, 2008 Primary Election
Party	Candidate	Votes	%
Democratic	David Lujan (incumbent)	4,860	50.8%
Democratic	Kyrsten Sinema (incumbent)	4,708	49.2%
Total votes		9,568	100

Arizona House of Representatives 15th District, 2008 General Election
Party	Candidate	Votes	%
Democratic	David Lujan (incumbent)	23,781	40.1%
Democratic	Kyrsten Sinema (incumbent)	22,721	38.3%
Republican	Ed Hedges	12,860	21.7%
Total votes		59,362	100
Democratic hold			

== Arizona Senate ==
=== 2010 ===
Arizona Senate 15th District, 2010 Primary Election
Party	Candidate	Votes	%
Democratic	Kyrsten Sinema	7,312	100
Total votes		7,312	100

Arizona Senate 15th District, 2010 General Election
Party	Candidate	Votes	%
Democratic	Kyrsten Sinema	18,013	62.82%
Republican	Bob Thomas	10,663	37.18%
Total votes		28,676	100
Democratic hold			

== U.S. House of Representatives ==
=== 2012 ===
Arizona's 9th Congressional District, 2012 Democratic Primary
Party	Candidate	Votes	%
Democratic	Kyrsten Sinema	15,536	40.8%
Democratic	David Schapira	11,419	30.0%
Democratic	Andrei Cherny	11,146	29.3%
Total votes		38,101	100

Arizona's 9th Congressional District, 2012 General Election
Party	Candidate	Votes	%
Democratic	Kyrsten Sinema	121,881	48.7%
Republican	Vernon Parker	111,630	44.6%
Libertarian	Powell E. Gammill	16,620	6.6%
Total votes		250,131	100
Democratic win (new seat)			

=== 2014 ===
Arizona's 9th Congressional District, 2014 Democratic Primary
Party	Candidate	Votes	%
Democratic	Kyrsten Sinema (incumbent)	31,900	100
Total votes		31,900	100

Arizona’s 9th Congressional District, 2014 General Election
Party	Candidate	Votes	%
Democratic	Kyrsten Sinema (incumbent)	88,609	54.68%
Republican	Wendy Rogers	67,841	41.86%
Libertarian	Powell Gammill	5,612	3.46%
Total votes		162,062	100
Democratic hold			

=== 2016 ===
Arizona's 9th Congressional District, 2016 Democratic Primary
Party	Candidate	Votes	%
Democratic	Kyrsten Sinema (incumbent)	38,948	100
Total votes		38,948	100

Arizona’s 9th Congressional District, 2016 General Election
Party	Candidate	Votes	%
Democratic	Kyrsten Sinema (incumbent)	169,055	60.92%
Republican	Dave Giles	108,350	39.04%
Green	Cary Dolego (write-in)	56	0.02%
Independent	Axel Bello (write-in)	46	0.02%
Total votes		277,507	100
Democratic hold			

== U.S. Senate ==
=== 2018 ===
2018 United States Senate Democratic Primary in Arizona
Party	Candidate	Votes	%
Democratic	Kyrsten Sinema	404,170	79.3%
Democratic	Deedra Abboud	105,800	20.7%
Total votes		509,970	100

2018 United States Senate General Election in Arizona
Party	Candidate	Votes	%	±%
Democratic	Kyrsten Sinema	1,191,100	50.0%	+3.8%
Republican	Martha McSally	1,135,200	47.6%	−1.6%
Green	Angela Green	57,442	2.4%	N/A
Write-in		566 (Note: Barry Hess (Libertarian) – 365 votes Jonathan Ringham (The Old Republic) – 46 votes Michael DeCarlo – 45 votes Sheila Bilyeu (Democratic) – 42 votes Robert Kay (Republican) – 37 votes Jeff Pearce (Independent) – 29 votes Edward Davida (Anti-Terror Party) – 2 votes)	nil	N/A
Total votes		2,384,308	100	N/A
Democratic gain from Republican				
