= David Niose =

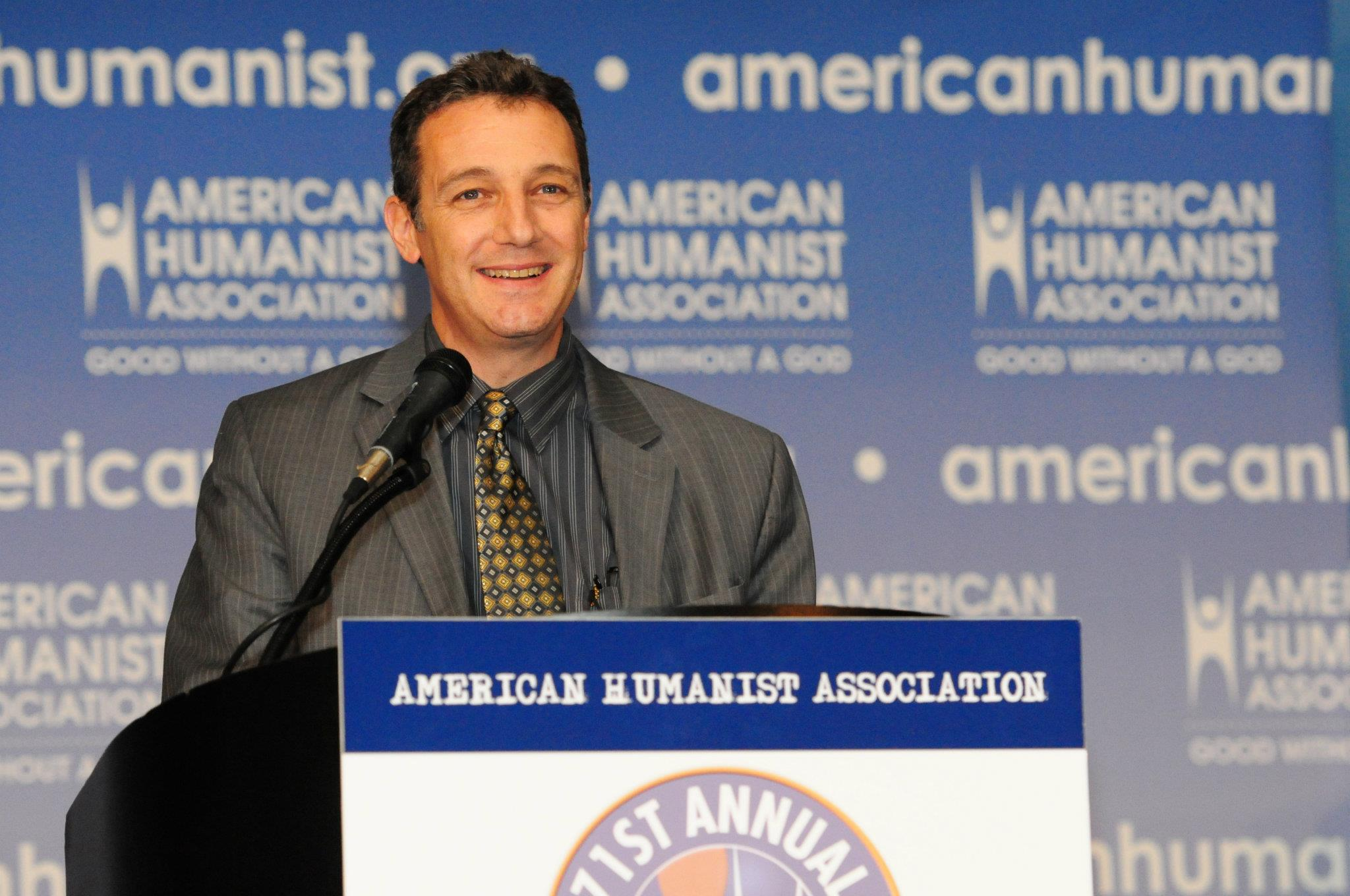
- David Niose speaking at the 2012 American Humanist Association conference.
- Born: August 20, 1962 (age 64); Concord, MA
- Occupations: Attorney, Author, former President of the American Humanist Association and Secular Coalition for America

David Niose (born August 20, 1962) is an attorney, author, and activist who has served as president of the American Humanist Association and the Secular Coalition for America. In these positions he has pursued legal and advocacy efforts on behalf of secularism.

== Biography ==
Niose was born in Concord, Massachusetts. He majored in journalism at Boston University, where he graduated with a B.S. in 1984. He graduated from Suffolk University Law School in 1990, and was admitted to the Massachusetts bar in 1990. He opened his own law office in 1993.

== AHA and SCA activity ==
Niose joined the American Humanist Association board of directors in 2005. He served two terms as president of the AHA, before becoming president of the Secular Coalition. In January 2014 he left the presidency of the Secular Coalition for America to become legal director of the American Humanist Association.

Upon joining the AHA board in 2005, Niose helped develop and launch a national advertising campaign promoting humanism in 2005, one of the first national ad campaigns by a secular group in America. The campaign included a series of full-page ads in several national magazines. As AHA president Niose oversaw additional advertising campaigns which have included national television, radio, billboards, and public transit. These efforts have since been replicated by other secular groups. In late 2011 the AHA launched a $200,000 holiday billboard campaign, placing advertisements in 7 different cities, which included a billboard reading "Yes, Virginia, there is no god."

In 2007 Niose initiated a contest sponsored by the Secular Coalition for America that resulted in Rep. Pete Stark (D-CA) becoming the first member of Congress to openly identify as an atheist. As AHA president Niose urged President Obama to decline the honorary presidency of the Boy Scouts until their policy to exclude atheists is changed.

Niose developed a legal strategy arguing the concept of equal rights and nondiscrimination rather than the First Amendment's Establishment Clause in cases protecting religious minorities. In 2014 the AHA brought suit against a New Jersey school district, taking the approach that the phrase "under God" in the Pledge of Allegiance was discriminatory against atheists. In February 2015 a New Jersey Superior Court Judge dismissed the suit ruling that "...the Pledge of Allegiance does not violate the rights of those who don't believe in God and does not have to be removed from the patriotic message." This followed a similar ruling of the Massachusetts Supreme Judicial Court in May 2014.

Niose has appeared on national and local media outlets speaking on secularism, humanism, law, and public policy. His television appearances include MSNBC, Fox News, and The Daily Buzz. National radio programs guest appearances include The Thom Hartmann Show, the BBC, The Alan Colmes Show, The David Boze Show with Michael Medved and The Jeff Farias Show. Niose has also appeared on numerous local media outlets all across the United States and has been interviewed by the National Journal.

He has written for media outlets including Salon, The Washington Post, Newsday, The Huffington Post, Lawyer's Weekly publications, Humanist magazine, AlterNet, and Progressive Populist. Since 2011, Niose has written a blog on humanist and secular issues for Psychology Today.

Niose is the author of Nonbeliever Nation: The Rise of Secular Americans, released in 2012 by Palgrave Macmillan. A second book, Fighting Back the Right: Reclaiming America from the Attack on Reason, was released in 2014.
