= Who Must Die in Rwanda's Genocide?: The State of Exception Realized =

2015 book by Kyrsten Sinema

Who Must Die in Rwanda's Genocide?
- 1st edition
- Author: Kyrsten Sinema
- Language: English
- Subject: Rwandan genocide; human rights in Rwanda; history of Rwanda; state of exception; necropolitics
- Genre: Non-fiction; qualitative research; political theory
- Publisher: Lexington Books
- Publication date: September 11, 2015
- Publication place: United States
- Pages: 175
- ISBN: 978-1-498-51864-2 (hardback)
- Dewey Decimal: 967.571042
- LC Class: DT450.435 .S57 2015

Who Must Die in Rwanda's Genocide?: The State of Exception Realized is a 2015 non-fiction book by American politician Kyrsten Sinema. Published by Lexington Books, the book is a qualitative study on the history of human rights violations in Rwanda, culminating with the Rwandan genocide of 1994. The book's text is derived from Sinema's 2012 doctoral thesis, Who Must Die: The State of Exception in Rwanda's Genocide, presented to fulfill her Doctor of Philosophy (PhD) in justice studies from Arizona State University.

Sinema researched and prepared the text in 2010 and 2011, when she was an elected member of the Arizona State Legislature—first as a state representative, then as a state senator. She traveled to Rwanda, Tanzania, and the United Kingdom while researching her thesis. Her analysis draws from the concept of the state of exception, as developed by the Italian philosopher Giorgio Agamben, as well as Cameroonian philosopher Achille Mbembe's work on necropolitics. After defending her thesis, Sinema was elected to the federal House of Representatives (in 2012) and later the Senate (in 2018). Her study of the genocide made a significant impression on her political views, and she has cited it as an influence on her generally interventionist positions in some areas related to American foreign policy.

== Background ==
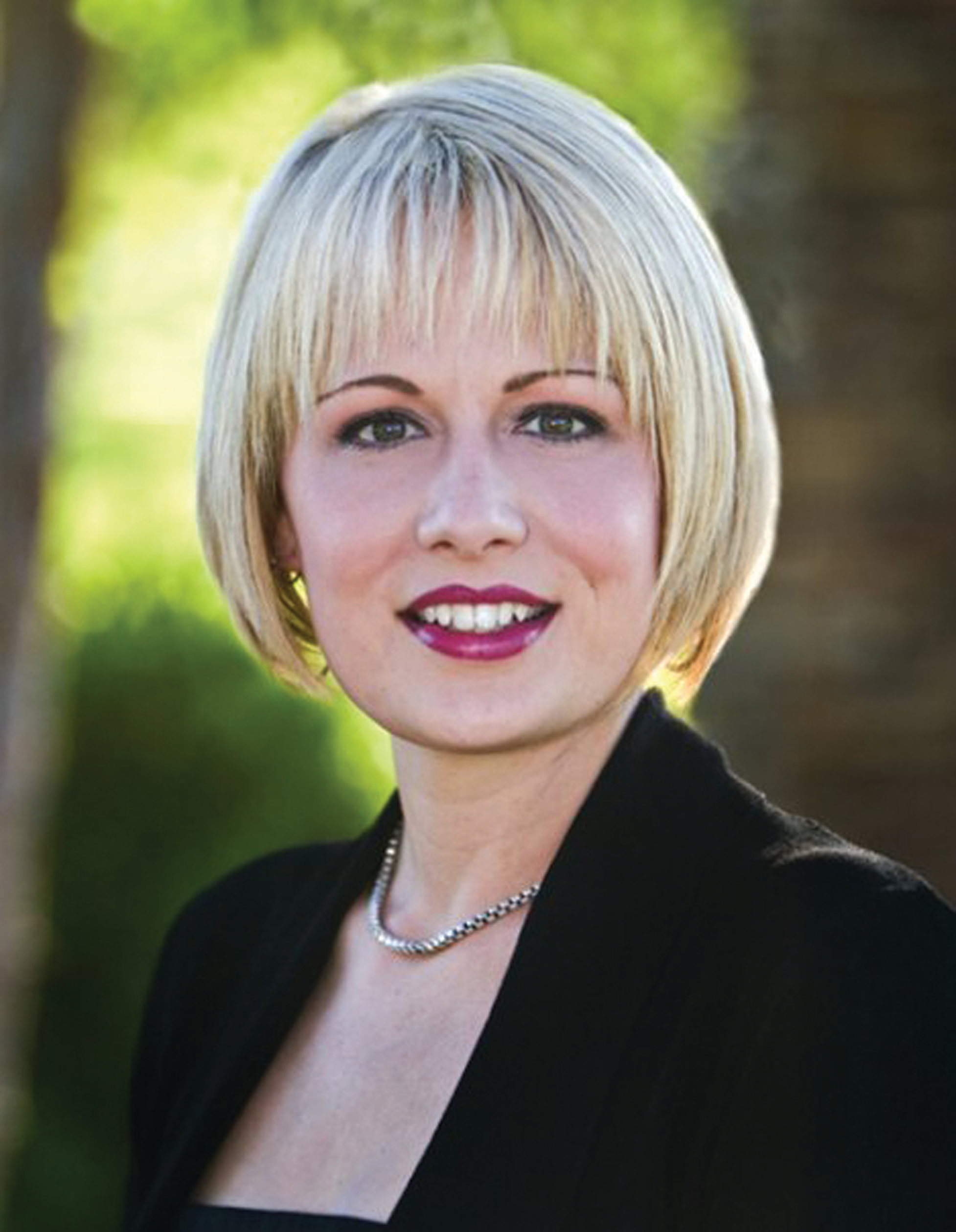
Sinema in 2010

At the time of the Rwandan genocide, which took place in 1994, Sinema was an undergraduate student at Brigham Young University in Provo, Utah. Amid the Rwandan Civil War, Hutu-led armed militias slaughtered members of the Tutsi minority ethnic group. As she would later write, the genocide is "notable for its swiftness, brutality, and intense efficiency. Nearly one million people were killed in less than 100 days." Her memory of the event inspired her later involvement with the Save Darfur Coalition and the broader movement to raise awareness of, and respond to, the Darfur genocide and the War in Darfur. In her first book, Unite and Conquer: How to Build Coalitions That Win and Last (2009), she wrote: "I remembered the Rwandan genocide—which occurred in the blip of a news cycle while I was in college—and I remembered how I felt then, like I had no power to stop what was happening. I did not want a repeat of 1994. This time, I was going to be part of a solution."

Sinema traveled "extensively" during the process of writing her dissertation. In 2010 and 2011, she visited Rwanda and Arusha, Tanzania, where the International Criminal Tribunal for Rwanda (ICTR) was established, meeting with prosecutors for the international court, archivists, and historians. She obtained copies of documentary evidence from the Office of the Prosecutor (OTP), headed by Hassan Bubacar Jallow. While in the Rwandan capital city Kigali, she witnessed the sentencing of Augustin Bizimungu, Augustin Ndindiliyimana, François-Xavier Nzuwonemeye, and Innocent Sagahutu, all of whom participated in the genocide as part of the Rwandan Armed Forces. While in Rwanda, she met the British investigative journalist Linda Melvern, who invited her to review her personal archive in London; afterward, Sinema also reviewed the Linda Melvern Rwanda Archive at Aberystwyth University in Wales. In the preface to her thesis, Sinema noted: "While I feel extraordinarily lucky to have been granted access to documents in Rwanda, Tanzania, London and Wales, my position as an Arizona State Representative in 2010 and Arizona State Senator in 2011 likely allowed me to gain access to people and places that I would have struggled to access as a private citizen."

== Publication ==
Sinema resigned from her position in the Arizona Senate in January 2012 to prepare a run for the United States House of Representatives. That April, she submitted her thesis to Arizona State University in April 2012; it was published the following month. Her PhD in justice studies became her third graduate degree, having already obtained a Master of Social Work (MSW) and Juris Doctor (JD). (Note: Sinema later obtained a fourth degree, a Master of Business Administration (MBA).) In November, she won the US House election for Arizona's 9th congressional district. In 2015, Sinema's thesis was published in a hardback edition by Lexington Books.

== Contents ==
The state of exception in Rwanda did not spontaneously occur in Rwanda, it was initially developed by German and Belgian colonizers, adopted by two successive Hutu regimes, and nurtured and fed for 35 years of Rwandan independence until its final realization in the 1994 genocide.

— Kyrsten Sinema, from the abstract to Who Must Die: The State of Exception in Rwanda's Genocide (2012)

Sinema's thesis analyzes the Rwandan genocide using the framework of the political "state of exception" as developed by the left-wing Italian philosopher Giorgio Agamben. The term refers to a situation in which a political sovereign suspends rule of law for the supposed greater good, typically citing emergency conditions as a justification (or pretext) for authorization of extralegal powers. The concept originated with German theorist Carl Schmitt, a conservative thinker and Nazi who provided legal support for Adolf Hitler's rise to power, but it later gained broader currency within the field of political science. Agamben, in his 2005 book State of Exception, argued that sovereign exercise of extrajudicial power under "emergency" circumstances had become normalized, particularly in what he criticized as an increasingly illiberal American government during its war on terror. In addition to Agamben and Schmitt, Sinema's analysis prominently cites the work of French thinker Michel Foucault.

Sinema's thesis also examines the topics of necropolitics and dehumanization. Necropolitics—a concept first developed by Cameroonian philosopher Achille Mbembe—refers to the exercise of social and political power in the determination of who may and who must die. "For the Hutu Power faction in Rwanda, Tutsi were not People," Sinema wrote, "They were simply a threat to the existing power structure, a structure that had operated since independence without regard to the juridical order." She analyzes instances of dehumanizing public rhetoric; for example, she cites the phrase "a cockroach cannot give birth to a butterfly" to illustrate the proliferation of an extreme disregard for Tutsi personhood and anticipation of mass murder.

== The Rwandan genocide in Sinema's political views ==
Following Sinema's election to the US House of Representatives in 2012, Arizona journalist Peter O'Dowd commented that her thesis was "a deeply researched body of work with some potentially interesting political insights into the mind of an increasingly important person in state and federal policymaking." According to Sinema, the Rwandan genocide deeply informed her views on American foreign policy. It was reported in 2012 that "she wished U.S. troops had intervened earlier in Rwanda and in World War II." In 2014, she made a statement to the US House of Representatives marking the Day of Remembrance of the Victims of the Rwanda Genocide. She reiterated her regret that there had not been an earlier, more robust American intervention in Rwanda in an interview with The Arizona Republic in 2018, during which time she was campaigning in the US Senate election in Arizona; she subsequently won the election.

== Reception ==
The thesis received critical academic attention after its 2015 republication. A 2017 review at the Canadian Journal of African Studies praised Sinema's thesis for its specificity, thoroughness, and documentation, and noted that her sources—not typically available to academics, as she acknowledges—"offer support to the already established narrative and understanding of the political elite." In 2018, a German scholar criticized Sinema's chapter on the origins of the Hutu, Tutsi, and Twa people as an example of the ways a scholar can "do considerable damage and contribute to the discrimination and marginalization of people with little effort." Specifically, he felt she had neglected the Twa people, understated their degree of social and marital intermingling with others, and misrepresented the range of extant scholarship on the Twa. In a 2019 review for African Studies Review, Kristin C. Doughty said "the book misses an opportunity to advance our understanding about how the genocide occurred, or to retheorize governance and the state of exception in Rwanda or African states more widely, for two reasons"—namely, that "Sinema neglected to engage with the extensive scholarship within and outside of Rwanda on sovereignty, necropolitics, bare life, and the genocide that have been produced over the past twenty-five years, and she did not acknowledge how the one-sided perspective of the sources she uses ... led her to fit facts into a preexisting script." Doughty further suggested Sinema had a responsibility, as a public political official, to apply her analysis to the contemporary political situations in Rwanda under the presidency of Paul Kagame and in the United States under the presidency of Donald Trump.

In a 2021 op-ed for Teen Vogue, Namrata Verghese wrote that "Sinema's grad school dissertation on necropolitics did not stop her from championing its lethal logic when she voted against raising the federal minimum wage." That same year, in an essay for the British website UnHerd, Blake Smith criticized Sinema's scholarship as relying on "a handful of incompletely understood concepts" from Schmitt and Agamben and said it "no original insights, and hardly any grasp on the theory that supposedly informs it." Nonetheless, Smith found her thesis illustrative of certain trends in American political thought and tied it to her shift from anti-war activism in the 2000s to radical centrism as a national politician. In Smith's view, Agamben's political critiques had become useful to the American left during the presidency of George W. Bush, in light of the PATRIOT Act's expansion of mass surveillance programs, and the allegations of torture and other human rights violations at Guantanamo Bay Naval Base. However, Agamben's political salience for liberals had diminished the time Sinema was writing her thesis during the presidency of Barack Obama. For Smith, "her academic work will glint as one ironic point of light in this vast change in the way liberals and conservatives in America think about themselves and their country."

== See also ==
- State of exception
- Necropolitics
- Bibliography of the Rwandan genocide

== Sources ==
- Doughty, Kristin C. (October 14, 2019). "Kyrsten Sinema. Who Must Die in Rwanda's Genocide? The State of Exception Realized. London: Lexington Books, 2015. xv + 176 pp. Appendices. Bibliography. $95.00. Cloth. ISBN: 978-1498518642". African Studies Review. 62 (4). Cambridge University Press: E19–E20. doi:10.1017/asr.2019.63.
- Ellmauer, Michael (May 24, 2018). "they could be easily ignored" – Kuneena Batwa: A History of Discrimination and Marginalization of Indigenous People—Using the Example of the Batwa in Rwanda and the Great Lakes Region (Thesis). University of Salzburg.
- Fischer, Howard (January 3, 2012). "Sinema quits Legislature to run for Congress". East Valley Tribune. Tempe, Arizona: Times Media Group.
- Fischer-Tahir, Andrea; Wagenhofer, Sophie (2017). "Introduction: Spatial Control, Disciplinary Power and Assimilation: the Inevitable Side-Effects of 'Progress' and Capitalist 'Modernity'". In ———; ——— (eds.). Disciplinary Spaces: Spatial Control, Forced Assimilation and Narratives of Progress since the 19th Century. Social and Cultural Geography. Vol. 14. Bielefeld, Germany: transcript Verlag. doi:10.1515/9783839434871-002. ISBN 978-3-8394-3487-1. S2CID 243471389.
- Lederman, Josh (May 2, 2012). "Candidate's stance on Afghan, Iraw wars faces scrutiny in Dem primary". The Hill. Archived from the original on May 7, 2022.
- MacAulay, Alison (July 16, 2017). "Who Must Die in Rwanda's Genocide? The State of Exception Realized". Canadian Journal of African Studies. 51 (3). Taylor & Francis, on behalf of the Canadian Association of African Studies: 459–460. doi:10.1080/00083968.2017.1342940. S2CID 149351395.
- Murphy, Tim (July–August 2021). "Shape Shifter". Mother Jones. Vol. 46, no. 4. pp. 48–55, 64–65. EBSCOhost 150572191; ProQuest 2543523434.
- O'Dowd, Peter (December 27, 2012). "A New Congresswoman's Dissertation on Genocide". Border Lines: The Fronteras Desk Blog. Phoenix, Arizona: KJZZ 91.5 FM. Archived from the original on June 16, 2013.
- Robb, Robert (October 24, 2018). "Senate hopefuls a blur on national security". The Arizona Republic. Phoenix. p. A2. ProQuest 2124412082.
- Sinema, Kyrsten (2009). Unite and Conquer: How to Build Coalitions That Win and Last. San Francisco: Berrett-Koehler Publishers. ISBN 978-1-57675-889-2 – via the Internet Archive.
- Sinema, Kyrsten (May 2012). Who Must Die: The State of Exception in Rwanda's Genocide (Thesis). Tempe: Arizona State University. hdl:2286/R.I.14837.
- Sinema, Kyrsten (April 29, 2014). Day of Remembrance of the Victims of the Rwanda Genocide (PDF) (Speech). Session of the 113th United States Congress. Congressional Record. The Capitol Building, Washington, D.C. Archived from the original on July 1, 2019 – via govinfo.gov.
- Smith, Blake (October 26, 2021). "The Democrat who could bring down Biden". UnHerd. London. Archived from the original on October 26, 2021.
- Verghese, Namrata (March 10, 2021). "What Is Necropolitics? The Political Calculation of Life and Death". Teen Vogue. New York: Condé Nast. Archived from the original on March 10, 2021.
