= Chad Campbell (politician) =

American politician (born 1973)

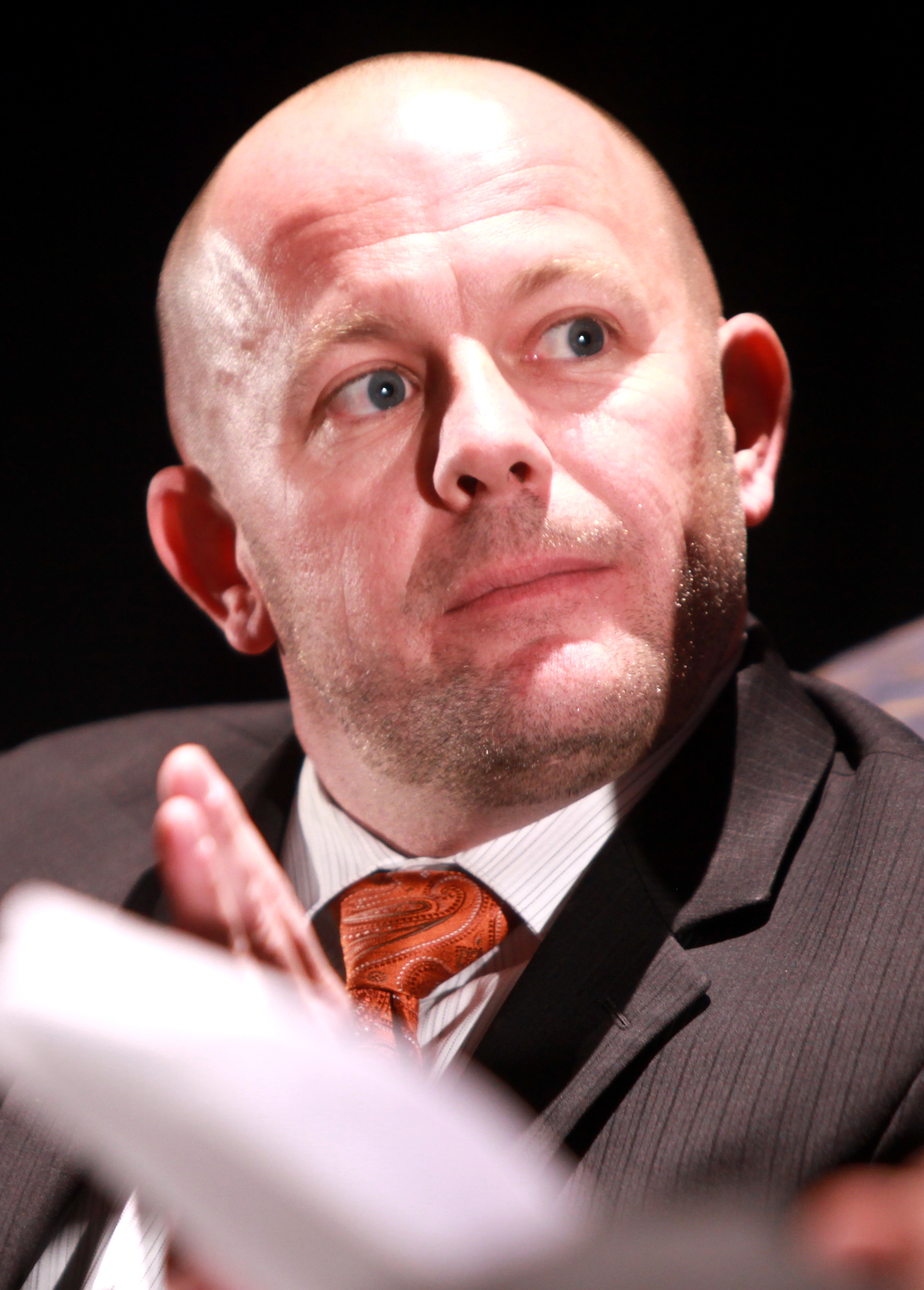
- Campbell in 2014

Minority Leader of the Arizona House of Representatives
- In office January 5, 2011 – January 5, 2015
- Preceded by: David Lujan
- Succeeded by: Eric Meyer

Member of the Arizona House of Representatives
- In office January 8, 2007 – January 5, 2015
- Preceded by: Debbie McCune Davis
- Succeeded by: Ken Clark
- Constituency: 14th district (2007–2013); 24th district (2013–2015)

Personal details
- Born: March 5, 1973 (age 53) Phoenix, Arizona, U.S.
- Party: Democratic
- Education: Northern Arizona University (BS)

Chad Campbell (born March 5, 1973) is an American politician from Arizona, who represented the 24th district in the Arizona House of Representatives from 2007 to 2015 and served as minority leader during the final four years of his tenure. He is a member of the Democratic Party.

Campbell is the current chief of staff to Arizona governor Katie Hobbs, having been selected on May 31, 2023.

== Personal life and education ==
Campbell attended Moon Valley High School. Campbell graduated from Northern Arizona University in 1996, earning a B.S. in Environmental Science.

== Political career ==
Campbell was elected to the Arizona House of Representatives in 2007, and served as the minority leader from 2010 through 2014. He served as ranking member on the Appropriations Committee. He left office in 2014.

In response to the 2011 Tucson shooting, Campbell proposed a legislative package that would increase background checks for gun purchasers and increase funding for mental health programs.

Along with moderate house Republicans, Campbell led his party in passing the Medicaid expansion advocated by Governor Jan Brewer, despite the opposition of Republican Speaker Andy Tobin.

In 2022, Campbell co-founded Phoenix-based consulting firm Lumen Strategies. In June 2023, he joined Arizona Governor Katie Hobbs' administration as Chief of Staff.

Arizona House of Representatives
Preceded by David Lujan	Minority Leader of the Arizona House of Representatives; 2011–2015	Succeeded by Eric Meyer
