= Lela Alston =

American politician (born 1942)

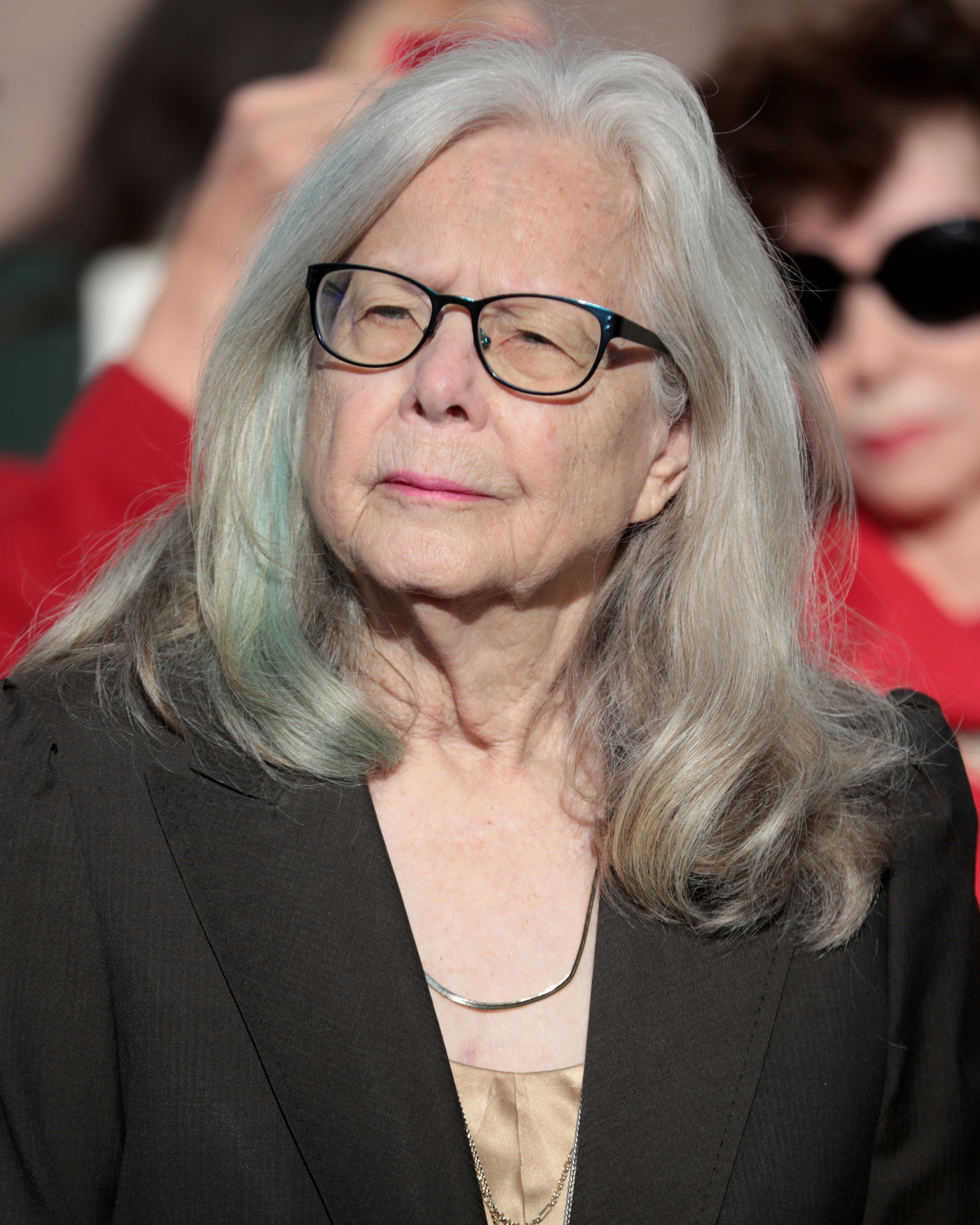

Member of the Arizona Senate
- Incumbent
- Assumed office January 14, 2019
- Preceded by: Katie Hobbs
- Constituency: 24th district (2019–2023); 5th district (2023–present)
- In office January 1977 – January 1995
- Preceded by: Bill McCune
- Succeeded by: Mary Hartley
- Constituency: 20th district

Member of the Arizona House of Representatives
- In office January 10, 2011 – January 14, 2019 Serving with Katie Hobbs (2011–2013); Ken Clark (2013–2019)
- Preceded by: David Lujan; Kyrsten Sinema
- Succeeded by: Jennifer Longdon
- Constituency: 15th district (2011–2013); 24th district (2013–2019)

Personal details
- Born: June 26, 1942 (age 84) Phoenix, Arizona, U.S.
- Party: Democratic
- Education: Phoenix College; University of Arizona; Arizona State University
- Website: lelaalstonaz.com

Lela Alston (born June 26, 1942) is an American politician and a Democratic member of the Arizona State Senate representing District 5 since January 9, 2023. She previously represented District 24 from 2019 to 2023, and served in the Arizona House of Representatives from 2013 to 2019, and from 2011 to 2013 in the District 11 seat, and non-consecutively in the Arizona State Legislature from 1977 until 1995 in the Arizona Senate.

== Education ==
Alston attended Phoenix College and earned her bachelor's degree from the University of Arizona, and Arizona State University.

== Abortion ==
In 1977, Alston voted for a 122-page bill which was consisted of the biggest overhaul of the state's criminal code since 1910. In this vote, she voted for the statute which re-numbered an 1864 abortion ban that contained no exceptions for rape or incest. In a 2024 statement, Alston said "it was just a bunch of numbers that we were transferring over."

== Elections ==
- 1976 When Republican Senator Bill McCune left the Legislature and left the Senate District 20 seat open, Alston won the November 2, 1976, general election with 10,045 votes (52.9%) against Republican nominee Howard Adams.
- 1978 Alston won the November 7, 1978, general election with 7,768 votes (59.5%) against Republican nominee George Hussey.
- 1980 Alston won the November 4, 1980, general election with 9,511 votes (64.2%) against Republican nominee Steve Hargan.
- 1982 Alston won the November 2, 1982, general election with 12,819 votes (59.9%) in a rematch against Republican nominee Steve Hargan.
- 1984 Alston won the three-way November 6, 1984, general election with 14,223 votes (52.9%) against Republican nominee Georgia Hargan and Independent candidate Dick Singer.
- 1986 Alston won the November 4, 1986, general election with 13,927 votes (59.7%) against Republican nominee Wayne Church.
- 1988 Alston won the November 8, 1988, general election with 16,405 votes (58.9%) against the Republican nominee.
- 1990 Alston won the November 6, 1990, general election with 13,395 votes (54.4%) against Republican nominee Harry Fennemore.
- 1992 Alston won the September 8, 1992, Democratic primary with 4,650 votes (98.6%) against write-in candidate Mary Hartley and won the November 3, 1992, general election with 19,313 votes (61.4%) against Republican nominee John Keck; Hartley would succeed Alston after winning the November 8, 1994, general election.
- 1994 Alston ran for the open Arizona Superintendent of Public Instruction in the September 13, 1994, Democratic primary, winning with 127,937 votes (54.8%) against Tempe Mayor Harry Mitchell, who later served in the Arizona Senate and represented Arizona's 5th congressional district in the United States House of Representatives; but lost the November 8, 1994, general election to Republican state Representative Lisa Graham.
- 2010 When Democratic Representatives David Lujan and Kyrsten Sinema ran for Arizona Attorney General and the Arizona Senate respectively, and thereby left open both seats in District 15, Alston ran in the three-way August 24, 2010, Democratic primary, placing second behind Katie Hobbs by 6 votes with 4,347 votes; in the six-way November 2, 2010, general election, Hobbs took the first seat, and Alston took the second seat with 15,167 votes ahead of Republican nominees Paul Yoder, Caroline Condit, and Independent candidate Les White and Green candidate Luisa Valdez; Hobbs was elected to the Arizona Senate in 2012 and became Arizona Secretary of State in 2019.
- 2012 Redistricted to District 24, with Democratic Representative Chad Campbell redistricted from District 14, and incumbent Representatives Democratic Lynne Pancrazi running for Arizona Senate and Republican Russ Jones redistricted to District 13, Alston ran in the four-way August 28, 2012, Democratic primary, placing first with 7,652 votes; Representative Campbell placed second. Alston and Representative Campbell won the four-way November 6, 2012, general election, with Alston taking the first seat with 34,018 votes and Representative Campbell taking the second seat ahead of Republican nominee Brian Kaufman and Green candidate Gerard Davis.
- 2014 Lela Alston and Ken Clark defeated Richard Bauer in the Democratic primary. Alston and Clark defeated Lei Lani Cortez in the general election with Alston receiving 21,740 votes.
