= Kyrsten Sinema =

American politician (born 1976)

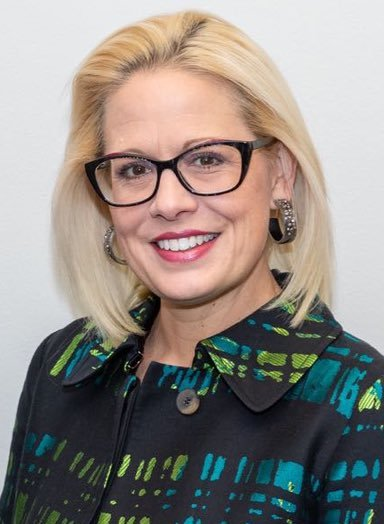
- Sinema in 2020

United States Senator from Arizona
- In office January 3, 2019 – January 3, 2025
- Preceded by: Jeff Flake
- Succeeded by: Ruben Gallego

Member of the U.S. House of Representatives from Arizona's 9th district
- In office January 3, 2013 – January 3, 2019
- Preceded by: Constituency established
- Succeeded by: Greg Stanton

Member of the Arizona Senate from the 15th district
- In office January 10, 2011 – January 3, 2012
- Preceded by: Ken Cheuvront
- Succeeded by: David Lujan

Member of the Arizona House of Representatives from the 15th district
- In office January 10, 2005 – January 10, 2011 Serving with David Lujan
- Preceded by: Wally Straughn; Ken Clark
- Succeeded by: Lela Alston; Katie Hobbs

Personal details
- Born: Kyrsten Lea Sinema; July 12, 1976 (age 50) Tucson, Arizona, U.S.
- Party: Green (before 2004); Democratic (2004–2022); Independent (2022–present)
- Other political affiliations: Senate Democratic Caucus (2019–2025) (Note: From 2022 to 2025, Sinema still received committee assignments through the Senate Democrats, but she did not attend or vote in caucus meetings.)
- Spouse: Blake Dain (m. 1995; div. 1999)
- Education: Brigham Young University (BA); Arizona State University, Tempe (MSW, JD, PhD, MBA)
- Kyrsten Sinema's voice Sinema on Sen. Rob Portman's retirement. Recorded December 8, 2022

Kyrsten Lea Sinema (/ˈkɪərstən ˈsɪnəmə/ KEER-stən SIN-ə-mə; born July 12, 1976) is an American politician, lawyer, and former social worker who served from 2019 to 2025 as a United States senator from Arizona. A former member of the Democratic Party, Sinema became an independent in December 2022.

Sinema served three terms as a state representative for the 15th legislative district from 2005 to 2011, one term as the state senator for the 15th legislative district from 2011 to 2012, and three terms as the United States representative for the 9th district from 2013 to 2019. She began her political career in the Arizona Green Party and rose to prominence for her progressive advocacy, supporting causes such as LGBT rights and opposing the war on terror. She left the Green Party to join the Arizona Democratic Party in 2004 and was elected to a seat in the United States House of Representatives in 2012. After her election, she joined the New Democrat Coalition, the Blue Dog Coalition and the bipartisan Problem Solvers Caucus, amassing one of the most conservative voting records in the Democratic caucus.

Sinema won the 2018 Senate election to replace the retiring Jeff Flake, defeating Republican nominee Martha McSally. She became the first openly bisexual and the second openly LGBTQ woman (after Tammy Baldwin) to be elected to the Senate. Sinema also became the first woman elected to the Senate from Arizona and the only religiously unaffiliated member of the Senate. She was one of four independents in the Senate, alongside Bernie Sanders, Angus King, and Joe Manchin, all of whom caucused with the Democrats.

Sinema was considered a key swing vote in the Senate during the 117th and 118th Congresses, when it was almost evenly split between Democrats and Republicans. On March 5, 2024, she announced she would not seek reelection and was succeeded by Democrat Ruben Gallego.

== Early life and education ==
Sinema was born in Tucson, Arizona, on July 12, 1976, to Marilyn (Wiley) and Dan Sinema. She has an older brother and younger sister. Her father was an attorney. Her parents divorced when she was a child, and her mother, who had custody of the children, remarried. With her siblings, mother, and stepfather, Sinema moved to DeFuniak Springs, Florida, a small town on the Panhandle.

Although she later became the only religiously unaffiliated member of the U.S. Senate, Sinema was raised as a Mormon (LDS Church).

Sinema has said that when her stepfather lost his job and the bank foreclosed on their home, the family lived for three years in an abandoned gas station and that for two years they had no toilet or electricity while living there. She later recalled: "My stepdad built a bunkbed for me and my sister. We separated our bunkbed from the kitchen with one of those big chalkboards on rollers. I knew that was weird. A chalkboard shouldn't be a wall. A kitchen should have running water."

According to journalist Jonathan Martin in The New York Times, Sinema has given "contradictory answers about her early life," and her mother and stepfather have filed court documents saying they had made monthly payments for gas, electricity, and phone bills, even though Sinema had said they had been "without running water or electricity". Asked whether she had embellished details from her childhood, Sinema said, "I've shared what I remember from my childhood. I know what I lived through."

=== Higher education ===
She graduated as valedictorian from Walton High School in DeFuniak Springs at age 16 and earned her B.A. from Brigham Young University (BYU) in 1995 at age 18. She left the LDS Church after graduating from BYU. Sinema returned to Arizona in 1995.

While employed as a social worker, Sinema completed a Master of Social Work degree at Arizona State University in 1999. In 2004, she earned a J.D. degree from Arizona State University College of Law and started working as a criminal defense lawyer. In 2012, she earned a Ph.D. in justice studies from Arizona State and in 2018, she completed an online M.B.A. from the W. P. Carey School of Business.

== Career ==
In 2003, Sinema became an adjunct professor teaching master's-level policy and grant-writing classes at Arizona State University School of Social Work and an adjunct business law professor at Arizona Summit Law School, formerly known as Phoenix School of Law. Sinema began her political career in the Arizona Green Party before joining the Arizona Democratic Party in 2004, and called herself a "Prada socialist".

In 2000, Sinema worked on Ralph Nader's presidential campaign. In 2001 and 2002, she ran for local elected offices as an independent and lost. In 2002, The Arizona Republic published a letter from Sinema criticizing capitalism. She wrote: "Until the average American realizes that capitalism damages her livelihood while augmenting the livelihoods of the wealthy, the Almighty Dollar will continue to rule." In 2003, she protested Joe Lieberman's unsuccessful 2004 presidential bid, telling the Hartford Courant: "He's a shame to Democrats. I don't even know why he's running. He seems to want to get Republicans voting for him – what kind of strategy is that?"

While in the Green Party, Sinema was its local spokesperson, working to repeal the death penalty and organizing antiwar protests. She had organized 15 antiwar rallies by the time the Iraq War began. She also opposed the war in Afghanistan. During a February 15, 2003, protest in Patriots Square Park in Phoenix, a group led by Sinema distributed flyers portraying a U.S. service member as a skeleton "inflicting 'U.S. terror' in Iraq and the Middle East".

In a 2003 opinion piece, Sinema wrote that presidents Ronald Reagan and George H. W. Bush were "the real Saddam and Osama lovers". When asked on a local radio show whether she would oppose someone joining the Taliban and fighting on its behalf, Sinema responded: "Fine ... I don't care if you want to do that, go ahead."

In a 2011 address to Netroots Nation, Sinema called Arizona the "meth lab of democracy", in contrast to the "laboratories of democracy" in other states.

In 2020, as a senator, Sinema became a summer intern in a two-week program at Three Sticks Winery in Sonoma, California, which is owned by Bill Price, the co-founder of private equity firm TPG Capital. Various transactions continued into 2021, as Price contributed $2,900 to Sinema's campaign. The campaign also reported "meeting expenses" with the winery, though Three Sticks made contradictory claims it was to purchase wine.

=== Career after elected office ===
In January 2025, Sinema joined Coinbase's Global Advisory Council to advocate for the cryptocurrency industry and help it coordinate with US lawmakers.

In March 2025, Sinema joined the law and lobbying firm Hogan Lovells as a senior advisor.

In October 2025, Sinema failed in an attempt to lobby the city council of the Phoenix suburb Chandler, Arizona to allow the development of an AI data center. Earlier in the year she founded and became the co-chair of the AI Infrastructure Coalition.

Sinema has since become a strong advocate for the Make America Healthy Again Movement and ibogaine.

== Arizona State Legislature (2005–2012) ==
=== Elections ===
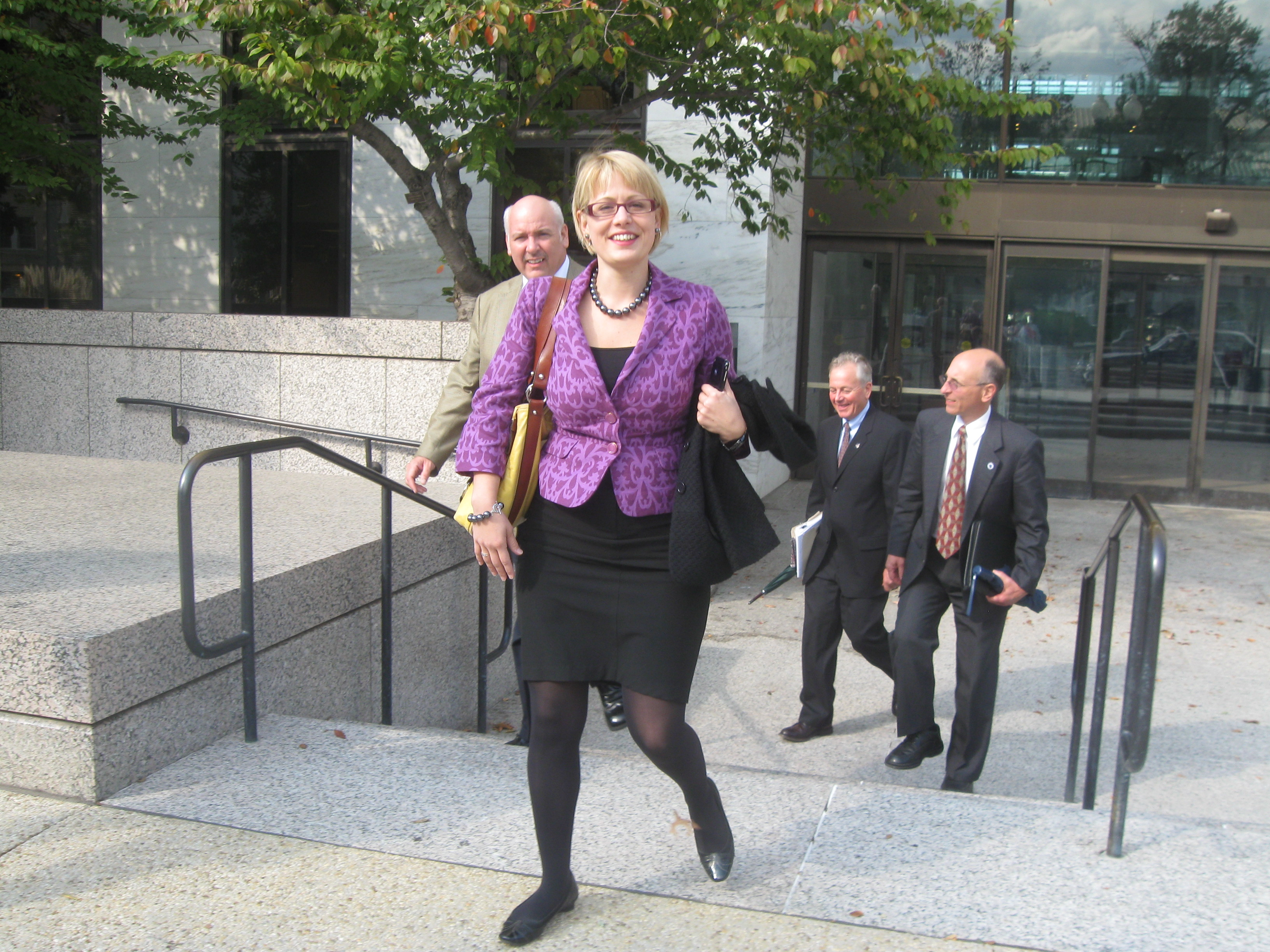
Sinema in 2009

In 2002, Sinema first ran for the Arizona House of Representatives as an independent affiliated with the Arizona Green Party. She finished in last place in a five-candidate field, receiving 8 percent of the vote.

Sinema joined the Democratic Party in 2004. That year, Sinema and David Lujan won the two seats for Arizona's 15th district, with 37 percent of the vote for Sinema and 34 percent for Lujan over incumbent representative Wally Straughn. Sinema was reelected three times with over 30 percent of the vote. In 2008, Sinema completed the Harvard University John F. Kennedy School of Government program for senior executives in state and local government as a David Bohnett LGBTQ Victory Institute Leadership Fellow. In 2009 and 2010, Sinema was an assistant Minority Leader for the Democratic Caucus of the Arizona House of Representatives.

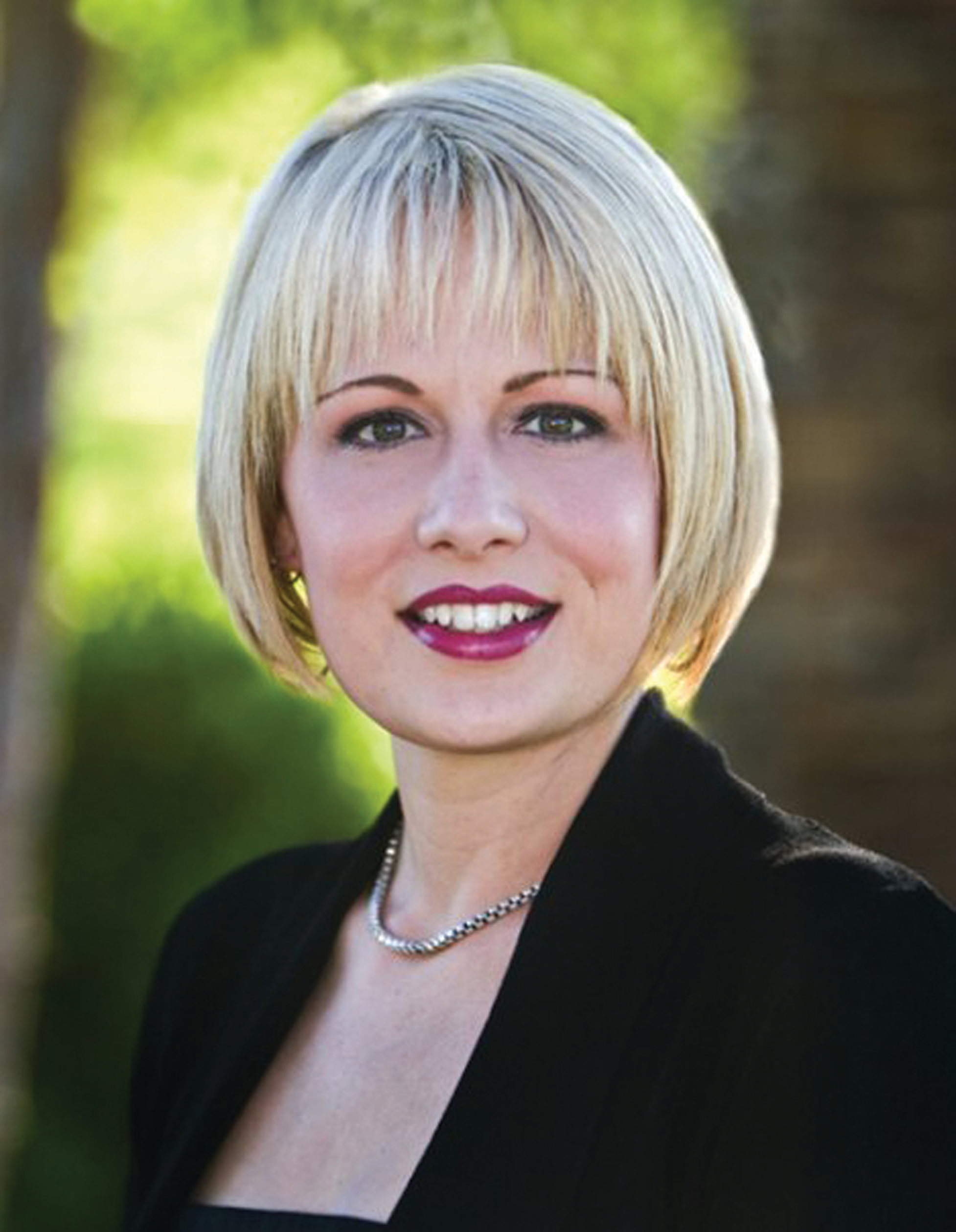
Sinema in 2010

In 2010, Sinema was elected to the Arizona Senate, defeating Republican Bob Thomas, 63 to 37 percent.

=== Tenure ===
According to Elle, "her first public comment as an elected official came in 2005, after a Republican colleague's speech insulted LGBT people. 'We're simply people like everyone else who want and deserve respect', she passionately declared. Later, when reporters asked about her use of the first person, Sinema replied, 'Duh, I'm bisexual.'" In 2012, when running for U.S. House, Sinema said she did not remember disclosing her sexual orientation in 2005 and declined to discuss the significance of being the first openly bisexual member of the House.

In 2006, Sinema told a radio host that she was "the most liberal member of the Arizona State Legislature". Also in 2006, she sponsored a bill urging the adoption of the DREAM Act, and co-chaired Arizona Together, the statewide campaign that defeated Proposition 107, which would have banned the recognition of same-sex marriage and civil unions in Arizona. In 2008, a similar referendum, Proposition 102, passed.

In 2006, Sinema was asked about "new feminism", and responded: "These women who act like staying at home, leeching off their husbands or boyfriends, and just cashing the checks is some sort of feminism because they're choosing to live that life. That's bullshit. I mean, what the fuck are we really talking about here?" After facing criticism, Sinema apologized and said the interview format was intended to be a "lighthearted spoof", adding: "I was raised by a stay-at-home mom. So she did a pretty good job with me."

Sinema campaigned against Proposition 107, a referendum to ban the recognition of same-sex marriage and civil unions in Arizona. In 2008, she led the campaign against Proposition 102, another referendum that proposed a ban on recognition of same-sex marriage in Arizona. Proposition 102 was approved with 56% of the vote in the general election on November 4, 2008. Sinema chaired a coalition called Protect Arizona's Freedom, which defeated Ward Connerly's goal to place an initiative on the state ballot that would eliminate racial-preference programs.

In June 2009, Sinema was one of 32 state legislators appointed by President Barack Obama to the White House Health Reform Task Force, which helped shape the Affordable Care Act. Due to her strong support of the bill, she was invited to attend the Obamacare bill signing at the White House in March 2010.

In 2010, Sinema sponsored a bill to give in-state tuition to veterans; it was held in committee and did not receive a vote. Also in 2010, Sinema was named one of Time magazine's "40 Under 40". The Center for Inquiry gave Sinema its Award for the Advancement of Science and Reason in Public Policy in 2011.

== U.S. House of Representatives (2013–2019) ==
=== Elections ===
==== 2012 ====
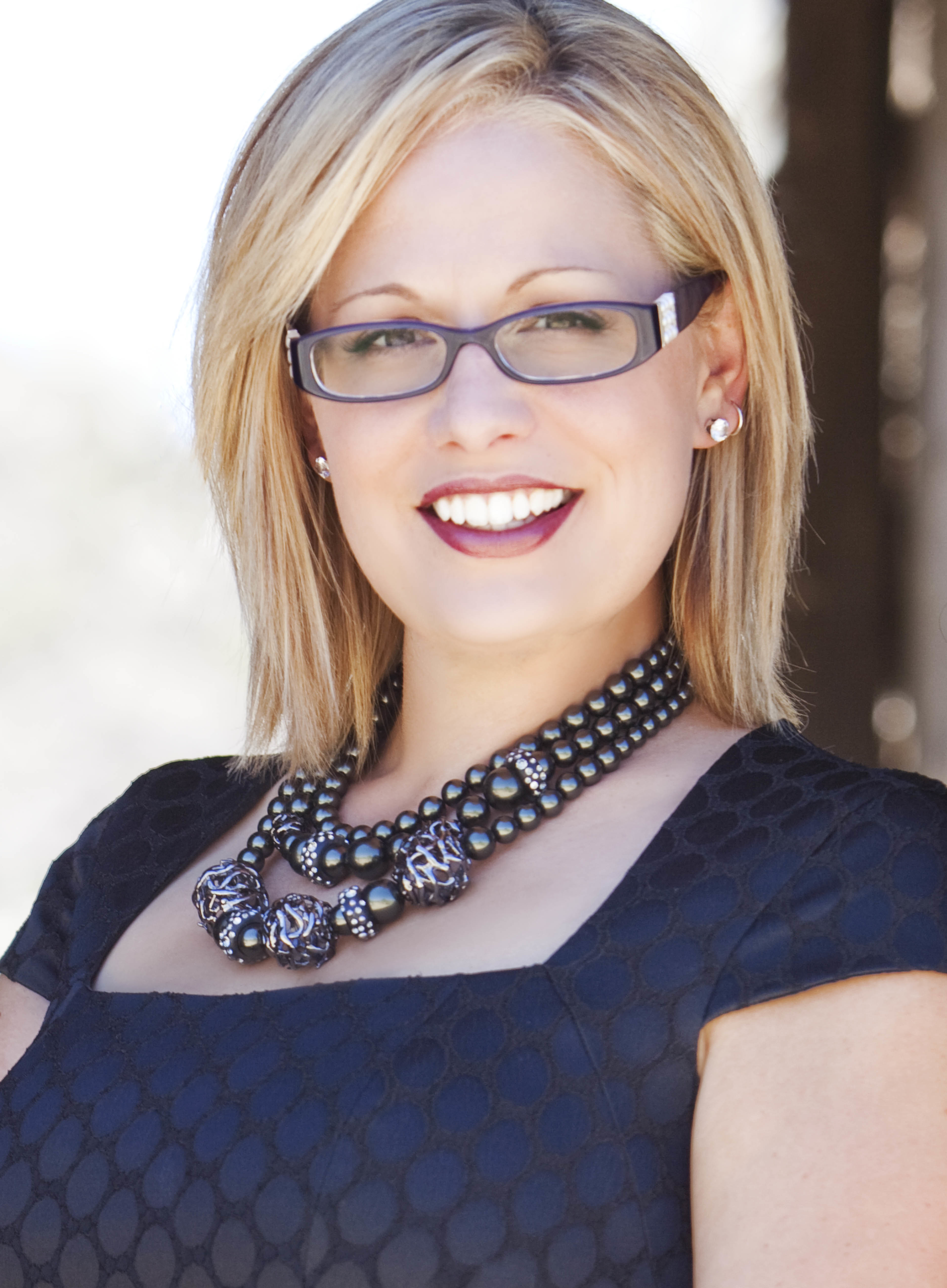
Sinema during the 113th Congress in 2013

In June 2011, Sinema said she was considering running for the U.S. House of Representatives in 2012. She lived in the same Phoenix neighborhood as incumbent Democratic congressman Ed Pastor, but was adamant that she would not challenge another Democrat in a primary. On January 3, 2012, Sinema announced her bid for Congress, in the 9th congressional district. The district had previously been the 5th, represented by freshman Republican David Schweikert; it contained 60 percent of the old 5th's territory. Schweikert had been drawn into the 6th district—the old 3rd district—and sought reelection there.

Although Sinema was not required to resign her State Senate seat under Arizona's resign-to-run laws (since she was in the final year of her term), she did so on the same day that she announced her candidacy. On August 28, 2012, Sinema won the three-way Democratic primary with nearly 42 percent of the vote. Her opponents, state senator David Schapira and former Arizona Democratic Party chairman Andrei Cherny, a former speechwriter in the Clinton administration, each finished with less than 30 percent of the vote.

In the general election, Sinema ran against Republican nominee Vernon Parker, the former mayor of Paradise Valley. She was endorsed by The Arizona Republic. The campaign was described as a "nasty", "bitterly fought race that featured millions of dollars in attack ads". Parker ran campaign ads that accused Sinema of being an "anti-American hippie" who practiced "Pagan rituals". The Republican-aligned outside group American Future Fund spent hundreds of thousands of dollars on attack ads against Sinema. When her religious views were raised as an issue, her campaign said that she simply believes in a secular approach to government.

The November 6 election was initially too close to call, because Arizona election authorities failed to count more than 25 percent of the votes on election day. Sinema held a narrow lead over Parker, while provisional and absentee ballots were still being counted. On November 12, when it was apparent that Sinema's lead was too large for Parker to overcome, the Associated Press called the race for Sinema.

Once all ballots were counted, Sinema won by 4 percentage points, over 10,000 votes. Libertarian Powell Gammill finished third with 7 percent of the votes.

Sinema is the first openly bisexual person and second openly LGBT woman (after Senator Tammy Baldwin of Wisconsin) elected to the United States Congress.

==== 2014 ====
Sinema ran for reelection in 2014 and was unopposed in the Democratic primary, which took place on August 26, 2014. She faced Republican Wendy Rogers in the general election.

According to Roll Call, Sinema considered herself bipartisan. It was drawn as a "fair-fight" district, and President Barack Obama won the district by four points in 2012. In September 2014, she was endorsed for reelection by the U.S. Chamber of Commerce, becoming one of five Democrats to be endorsed by the Chamber in the 2014 congressional election cycle. She was reelected with approximately 55 percent of the vote, beating Rogers by 13 points.

==== 2016 ====
Unopposed in her primary, Sinema won the general election with 61 percent of the vote. Her opponent, Republican nominee Dave Giles, received 39 percent.

=== Tenure ===
Following her election to Congress, Sinema shifted toward the political center, joining the conservative Democratic Blue Dog Coalition and the bipartisan Problem Solvers Caucus and amassing a "reliably moderate-Democratic" voting record. Sinema worked for the adoption of the DREAM Act, hiring DREAM Act advocate Erika Andiola as a district outreach staffer.

On the House Financial Services Committee, Sinema supported the Swaps Regulatory Improvement Act of 2013, which sought to exempt certain financial instruments from some Dodd-Frank restrictions. Bank lobbyists drafted key amendments, which appeared word-for-word in the bill she supported in the committee and on the House floor. It passed the House, with only 119 Democrats and three Republicans opposing it, but failed to advance in the Senate banking committee.

Sinema co-sponsored other anti-regulation bills, including the Systemic Risk Designation Improvement Act of 2015, which includes provisions that Silicon Valley Bank President Gregory W. Becker called for in testimony before Congress that year. That measure also failed to pass.

=== Committee assignments ===
- Committee on Financial Services
  - Subcommittee on Consumer Protection and Financial Institutions
  - Subcommittee on Oversight and Investigations

=== Caucus memberships ===
- New Democrat Coalition
- Congressional Arts Caucus
- Veterinary Medicine Caucus
- Blue Dog Coalition
- Problem Solvers Caucus
- Rare Disease Caucus

== U.S. Senate (2019–2025) ==
=== 2018 elections ===
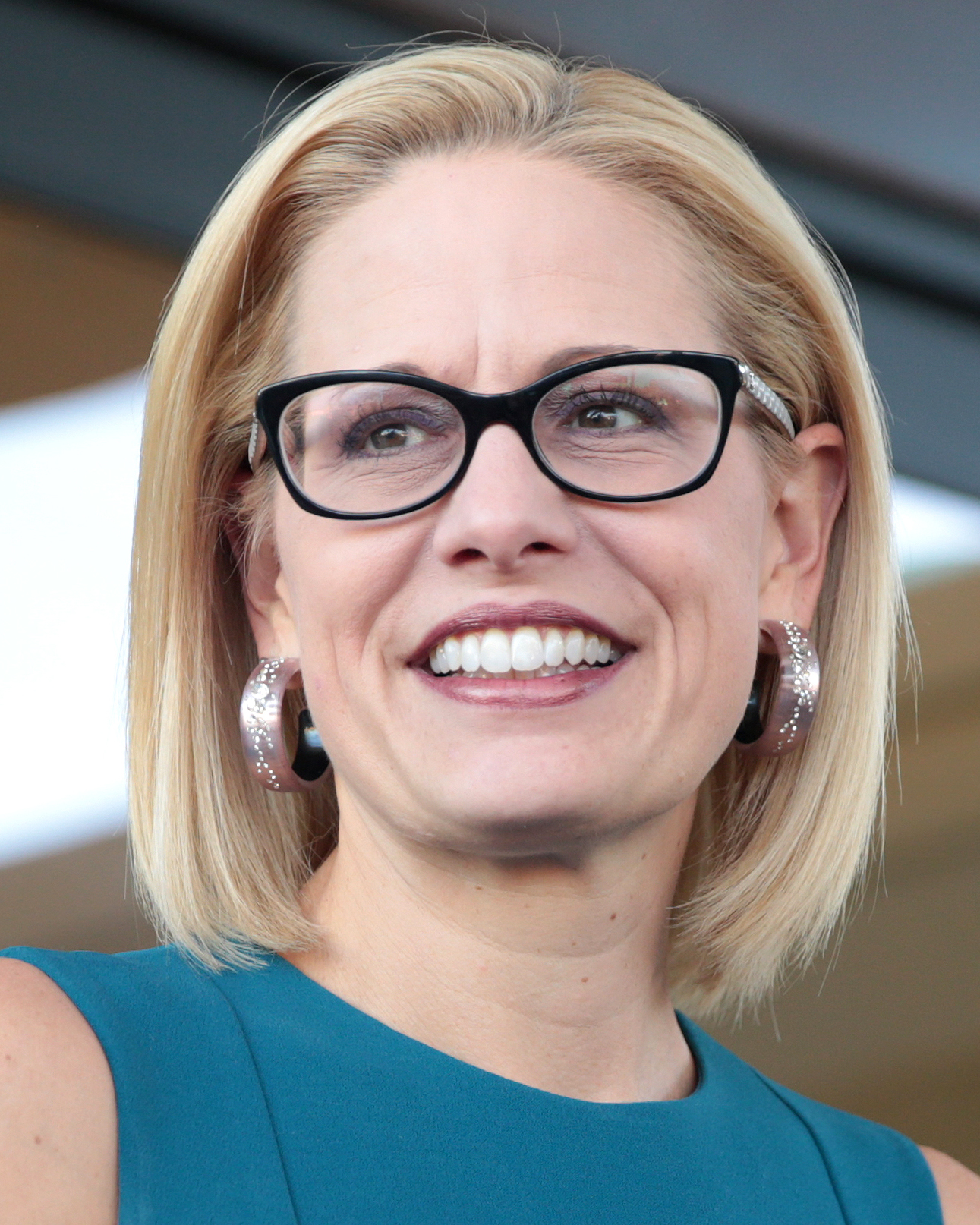
Sinema at a U.S. Senate campaign event in Phoenix, Arizona, in October 2018

On September 28, 2017, Sinema officially announced her candidacy for the Class I United States Senate seat held by Republican incumbent Jeff Flake, who declined to seek reelection the next month.

In March 2018, Sinema donated to charity $33,800 in campaign contributions she had received from Ed Buck, a prominent Democratic donor who came under scrutiny after a homeless escort died of a drug overdose at his California home in 2017. She had previously donated to charity $53,400 in campaign contributions from people with ties to Backpage, a website that was seized by the United States Department of Justice after it was accused of knowingly accepting ads for sex with underage girls.

Federal Election Commission filings released in April 2018 showed Sinema had raised over $8.2 million, more than the three leading Republican primary contenders combined.

During the 2018 campaign, Sinema refused to debate her competitor in the Democratic primary, Deedra Abboud, an attorney and community activist. Sinema won the August Democratic primary for the Senate seat. Her Republican opponent in the general election was fellow Arizona U.S. Representative and eventual Senate colleague Martha McSally. Sinema received the endorsement of the Human Rights Campaign.

While Abboud said she would vote against the nomination of Brett Kavanaugh to the Supreme Court, Sinema "said she wanted to delve deeper into Kavanaugh's writings and interview him personally before deciding". She said she was "running on the issues people care about most, including offering quality, affordable health care and promoting economic opportunity".

In the summer of 2018, Sinema said she would vote against Chuck Schumer for Minority Leader if elected to the U.S. Senate. "The Democratic leadership has failed Democrats across the country," she said. "I am unafraid to say what I believe about what I think our party needs to do and I think our party needs to grow and change."

Journalist Jonathan Martin wrote in The New York Times in September 2018 that Sinema was running "one of the most moderate-sounding and cautious Senate campaigns this year, keeping the media at arms-length and avoiding controversial issues," and said her campaign was generally reluctant to bring up President Donald Trump. According to Martin, both Republicans and Democrats said that Sinema had "few major legislative accomplishments to her record" and was running "on a political image that she has shaped and reshaped over the years. And nothing is more central to it now than her childhood homelessness."

On November 12, many news sources called the U.S. Senate race for Sinema, and the Republican nominee, Martha McSally, conceded. Sinema was sworn in with the 116th United States Congress on January 3, 2019.

Sinema is the first woman to represent Arizona in the United States Senate. She was also the first Democrat elected to represent Arizona in the chamber since Dennis DeConcini, who held the same Class 1 seat from 1977 to 1995.

=== Tenure ===
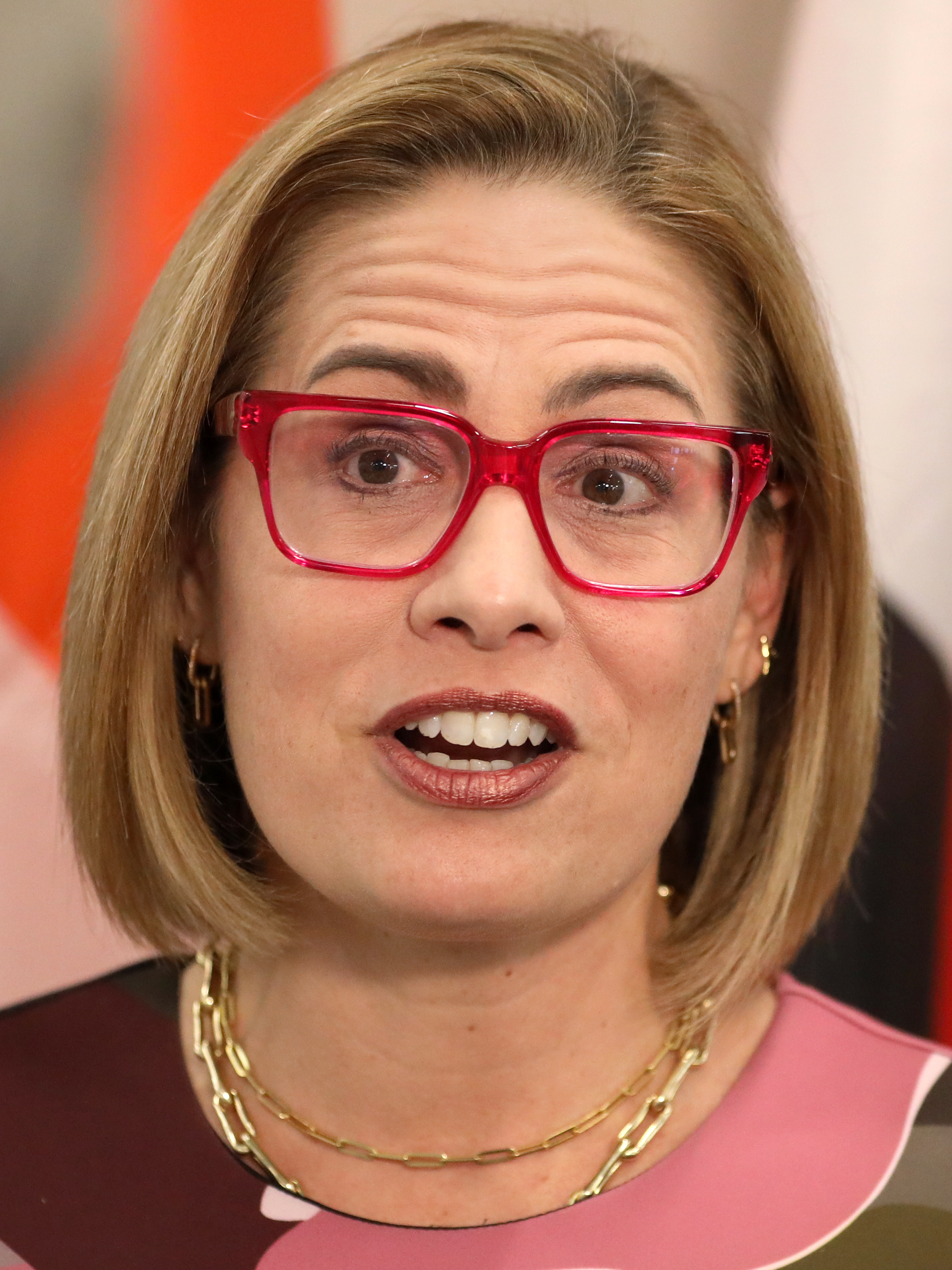
Sinema in 2023

Sinema was sworn in as a member of the U.S. Senate on January 3, 2019. During the oath of office ceremony, led by Vice President Mike Pence, she decided to be sworn in not on the traditional Bible, but on copies of the United States Constitution and the Constitution of Arizona. During her time in the Senate, she was the senior U.S. senator from Arizona; serving alongside then junior and now the senior U.S. senator for Arizona Democrat Mark Kelly. Kelly defeated Sinema's 2018 general election opponent, Martha McSally, who was appointed to fill the Senate seat vacated upon the resignation of Jon Kyl, who had been appointed to fill the Senate seat vacated upon the death of John McCain.

On February 14, 2019, Sinema voted to confirm William Barr as attorney general.

During the COVID-19 pandemic, Sinema was noted for her use of colorful wigs. Her spokeswoman explained that Sinema wore them to emphasize the importance of social distancing: by wearing wigs, she did not need to go to a hair salon.

Sinema voted to convict Donald Trump in both his first and second impeachment trials.

Sinema urged Senate colleagues to vote in favor of the proposed January 6 commission to further investigate the storming of the United States Capitol on January 6, 2021. In a joint statement with Senator Joe Manchin, she said, "we implore our Senate Republican colleagues to work with us to find a path forward on a commission to examine the events of January 6th." Sinema was one of two Senate Democrats who did not vote on it, the other being Senator Patty Murray of Washington. Murray and Sinema both cited a "personal family matter" for their absence.

In October 2021, five of the veterans Sinema had selected for her advisory council as liaisons to the Arizona service member community resigned. Their resignation letter accused her of "answering to big donors rather than your own people" and criticized her opposition to key Democratic Party issues, such as abolishing the filibuster and aspects of Biden's Build Back Better Plan.

Sinema's stance on the filibuster was sharply criticized by others in her party and her constituents. On January 22, 2022, the Arizona Democratic Party executive board voted to censure Sinema for voting with Senate Republicans to maintain the filibuster, preventing passage of a voting rights bill. The same year, the Arizona Youth Climate Coalition and the Tucson Climate Coalition worked on a pressure campaign to persuade Sinema to abolish the modern filibuster. The campaign included an open letter and petition signed by over 150 Arizona legislators, constituents, and climate action leaders, including her personal friend, Arizona Sierra Club director Sandy Bahr. The letter and an accompanying op-ed published in the Arizona Daily Star persuaded her office to meet her critics on February 24, 2022. The meeting was ultimately unsuccessful.

Sinema was the only U.S. elected official to attend the 2022 Bilderberg Conference, an annual private gathering of the European and North American political and business elite. About 120 high-level politicians, CEOs, national security experts, academics and journalists from 21 countries attended the closed-door meeting.

In December 2022, Sinema announced that she had left the Democratic Party and registered as an independent. She continued to caucus with the Democratic Party for committee assignments.

On March 5, 2024, Sinema announced that she would retire from Congress at the end of her term and not seek reelection, saying that her approach to fostering compromise seemed to be "a model of the past".

=== Committee assignments ===
- Committee on Appropriations
  - Subcommittee on Agriculture, Rural Development, Food and Drug Administration, and Related Agencies
  - Subcommittee on Energy and Water Development
  - Subcommittee on Interior, Environment, and Related Agencies
  - Subcommittee on Military Construction, Veterans Affairs, and Related Agencies
  - Subcommittee on Transportation, Housing and Urban Development, and Related Agencies
- Committee on Commerce, Science, and Transportation
  - Subcommittee on Aviation Safety, Operations, and Innovation (Chair)
  - Subcommittee on Communications, Media, and Broadband
  - Subcommittee on Space and Science
  - Subcommittee on Tourism, Trade and Export Promotion
- Committee on Homeland Security and Governmental Affairs
  - Subcommittee on Emerging Threats and Spending Oversight
  - Subcommittee on Government Operations and Border Management (Chair)
- Committee on Veterans' Affairs
- Special Committee on Aging (116th Congress)
- Committee on Banking, Housing, and Urban Affairs (116th–118th Congress)
  - Subcommittee on National Security and International Trade and Finance
  - Subcommittee on Securities, Insurance and Investment
  - Subcommittee on Economic Policy

== Political positions ==
Sinema has been described as a moderate and a centrist, being generally socially liberal but fiscally moderate-to-conservative. She has cited U.S. Senator Joe Manchin, a Democrat from West Virginia, as a role model.

In the House of Representatives, Sinema was a member of the Blue Dog Coalition and the Problem Solvers Caucus. According to the Bipartisan Index created by the Lugar Center and the McCourt School of Public Policy, Sinema was the sixth most bipartisan member of the U.S. House of Representatives during the first session of the 115th Congress. The National Journal's 2013 vote ratings placed Sinema near the center of their liberal–conservative scale. In 2015, she voted with the majority of her party 73% of the time. In 2015 and 2016, Sinema did not vote for Nancy Pelosi for speaker of the U.S. House. In 2016, the National Journal gave her a composite ideology score of 57% liberal and 43% conservative. She was one of the most conservative House Democrats during her House tenure.

According to GovTrack, Sinema has a centrist to center-right voting record in the Senate, to the right of Republican Senators Susan Collins and Lisa Murkowski. According to FiveThirtyEight, as of January 2021, Sinema had voted in line with Donald Trump's position on legislation about 50% of the time. As a result, the Arizona Democratic Party suggested censuring her. But after delaying the vote and watering down the resolution from a censure to an advisement, the Party ultimately tabled the resolution.

According to FiveThirtyEight, as of July 2022, Sinema had voted with President Biden's position on legislative issues 94% of the time.

In December 2022, Sinema changed her party registration to independent.

=== Abortion ===
When asked about Roe v. Wade in 2018, Sinema said the ruling should not be overturned and that she supports a woman's right to have an abortion. In 2020, she had a 100% rating from the abortion-rights organization Planned Parenthood, and a 0% rating from the anti-abortion organization Campaign for Working Families. She was endorsed by EMILY's List, an abortion-rights-focused political action committee, until 2022, when she voted with Republicans against changing the filibuster to allow passage of the Freedom to Vote and John R. Lewis Voting Rights Act. That vote also cost her the support of the abortion-rights advocacy group NARAL Pro-Choice America. After Roe v. Wade was overturned in June 2022, Sinema said the decision "endangers the health and well-being of women in Arizona and across America."

=== Capital punishment ===
While working as a spokesperson for the Arizona Green Party, Sinema worked to repeal the death penalty. In her 2009 book, Unite and Conquer, she explained her stance on capital punishment, writing that she opposed it "because I think no civilized society should use it as a punishment," though "since we have the death penalty in Arizona, I want to ensure that it's being implemented as fairly and judiciously as possible".

According to The Arizona Republic, while serving in the Arizona State Legislature, she introduced more bills regarding the death penalty than bills regarding military or veterans' families. In 2007, she introduced HB 2278, which would require the Arizona Supreme Court to "strike" any prior death sentence and "enter in its place a sentence of natural life", as in life without parole.

Sinema has served as an Advisory Board Member of the Arizona Death Penalty Forum. She was also a presenter at their 2010 Spring Conference, which was co-sponsored by Amnesty International and the ACLU of Arizona.

In 2017, Sinema and 47 other House Democrats voted with the majority of House Republicans on H.R. 115, Thin Blue Line Act of 2017, which was opposed by the ACLU. The bill would "expand the list of statutory aggravating factors in death penalty determinations" to include the killing or targeting of a law enforcement officer, first responder, or firefighter.

=== Defense ===
On February 5, 2019, Sinema voted for a bill that would make improvements to certain defense and security assistance provisions, authorize the appropriation of funds to Israel, and reauthorize the United States-Jordan Defense Cooperation Act of 2015. On March 13, 2019, she voted to remove the United States Armed Forces from hostilities in the Republic of Yemen that have not been authorized by Congress.

=== Economics and taxes ===
Sinema has voted for federal stimulus spending. She has said, "raising taxes is more economically sound than cutting vital social services."

In 2015, Sinema was one of just seven House Democrats to vote in favor of a Republican-backed bill to repeal the estate tax, which affects about 0.2% of Americans in the U.S. each year (estates of $5.43 million or more for individuals, or $10.86 million or more for couples). That same year, she voted to change the Consumer Financial Protection Bureau's leadership from a single director to a bipartisan commission.

In 2016, with Republican representative John Katko of New York, Sinema cosponsored the Working Parents Flexibility Act (H.R. 4699). This legislation would establish a tax-free "parental savings account" in which employers and parents could invest savings tax-free, with unused funds eligible to be "rolled into qualifying retirement, college savings or ABLE accounts for people with disabilities without tax penalties". In September 2018, she voted "to make individual tax cuts passed by the GOP [in 2017] permanent". She was one of three Democrats to break with her party and vote for the tax cuts being made permanent.

On July 30, 2019, Sinema and Senator Bill Cassidy released a proposal under which new parents would be authorized to advance their child tax credit benefits in order to receive a $5,000 cash benefit upon either birth or adoption of a child. The parents' child tax credit would then be reduced by $500 for each year of the following decade.

In 2022, several provisions of the Inflation Reduction Act of 2022 were changed after negotiations with Sinema: a provision narrowing the carried interest loophole was dropped, a 1% excise tax on stock buybacks was added, and manufacturing exceptions were added to the corporate minimum tax. Sinema had also previously threatened legislation in the Build Back Better plan if it did not preserve the carried interest loophole.

=== Labor issues ===
On February 12, 2021, Sinema became the second Democratic senator after Joe Manchin to announce her opposition to including a $15/hour minimum wage as part of a COVID-19 relief bill. On March 5, 2021, Sinema voted against an increase of the federal minimum wage to $15 an hour, proposed by Senator Bernie Sanders as part of the American Rescue Plan Act of 2021. She did so by flashing a thumbs-down, and some commentators compared her demeanor to that of former Arizona senator John McCain, who had voted with a dramatic thumbs-down gesture in 2017; others compared her to former French queen Marie Antoinette, to whom the phrase "let them eat cake" is attributed. Sinema's office responded that any commentary on her clothes and demeanor was sexist. Her vote was at odds with that of fellow Democrat Mark Kelly, the junior Arizona senator, who supports a $15/hour minimum wage.

In December 2024, Sinema and Joe Manchin joined Republican senators in voting to block Lauren McFerran's renomination to the National Labor Relations Board (NLRB), effectively blocking Democratic control of the NLRB until at least 2026 and allowing Republican control starting under President-elect Trump.

=== Education ===
In February 2019, Sinema was one of 20 senators to sponsor the Employer Participation in Repayment Act, enabling employers to contribute up to $5,250 to their employees' student loans.

=== Environment ===
In 2019, Sinema was one of four Democratic-caucusing senators to join all Republicans in voting against the Green New Deal, a stimulus program that aims to address climate change and economic inequality, while most other Democrats voted "present". In April 2019, Sinema was one of three Democrats who voted with Republicans to confirm David Bernhardt, a former oil executive, as Secretary of the Interior.

On February 12, 2019, Sinema voted along with the whole Senate for the Natural Resources Management Act, which provides for the management of the natural resources of the United States.

In 2022, Sinema voted for the Inflation Reduction Act, a major piece of climate and energy legislation designed to invest in renewable energy, which includes billions of dollars for drought relief.

=== Foreign policy ===
Sinema supports the use of military force to stop genocide, such as in Sudan, Somalia, and Rwanda. She wrote a doctoral dissertation on the 1994 Rwandan genocide that Lexington Books published in 2015 under the title Who Must Die in Rwanda's Genocide?: The State of Exception Realized.

Sinema was opposed to the wars in Afghanistan and Iraq and helped organize anti-war protests while a law student at Arizona State University. Sinema was involved in organizing a Phoenix-area group called the Arizona Alliance for Peaceful Justice (AAPJ). According to Josh Lederman of The Hill, "The group's mission statement at the time called military action 'an inappropriate response to terrorism' and advocated for using the legal system—not violence—to bring Osama bin Laden and others to justice."

As an antiwar activist in the years after 9/11, Sinema "led a group that distributed flyers depicting an American soldier as a skeleton inflicting 'U.S. terror' in Iraq and the Middle East." The flyers "promoted a February 2003 rally organized by Local to Global Justice, an anti-war group Sinema co-founded". Sinema was described in news reports as an organizer and sponsor of the rally and was listed as the point of contact for the event. One flyer referred to "Bush and his fascist, imperialist war", saying, "Government is slavery", and describing laws as "cobwebs for the rich and chains of steel for the poor". CNN said that such positions were "a contrast from the more moderate profile she has developed since her 2012 election to Congress".

In 2005 and 2006, she co-hosted an Air America radio show with 9/11 truther Jeff Farias. In 2006, Sinema said she opposed "war in all its forms", and wrote: "As one of the core organizers against the war from day one (September 12, 2001), I have always and will always continue to oppose war in all its forms."

After joining Congress in 2012, she said her views on military force had "evolved", and that "you should never take military intervention off the table. When you do so, you give an out to a rogue nation or rogue actors." Lederman reported that "she said she favors aggressive diplomacy, crippling sanctions to combat proliferation, and swift, multilateral intervention as a last resort". Since joining Congress, she has voted against the Iran Nuclear Deal and supported Trump's missile attack on Syria.

=== Guns ===
Sinema favors gun control measures such as requiring background checks on gun sales between private citizens at gun shows, and requiring a license for gun possession. In 2014 and 2018 the NRA Political Victory Fund (NRA-PVF), which opposes gun regulations, gave Sinema a "D" grade. Gun Owners of America gave her a 17% rating.

=== Health care ===
Sinema voted against repealing the Patient Protection and Affordable Care Act (also known as Obamacare), but has called for reforms to the law. In a 2012 congressional campaign debate, she said the health care law was not perfect, and that in Congress she would work to amend it to make it work effectively. Sinema voted to delay the imposition of fines on those who did not purchase insurance in 2014. She also voted to repeal the Medical Device Tax and for the Keep Your Health Plan Act of 2013.

Speaking about healthcare policy, Sinema said, "I used to say that I wanted universal health-care coverage in Arizona, which went over like a ton of bricks. Turns out, Arizonans hear the word 'universal' and think 'socialism'—or 'pinko commie'. But when I say that I want all Arizonans to have access to affordable, quality health care, Arizonans agree wholeheartedly. Same basic idea, different language."

=== LGBT rights ===
According to a profile in The Advocate, "Sinema has her sights set on advancing LGBT rights." She has a history of policy advocacy regarding LGBT rights and issues. In 2006, Sinema was among the leading opponents of a proposed amendment to the Arizona state constitution which would have banned same-sex marriages and civil unions. The proposal failed in Arizona, the first time that a state rejected a ban on same-sex marriage, but a second proposed amendment banning only same-sex marriage passed in 2008 with Sinema in opposition again. She supports same-sex marriage, domestic partnership recognition, and adding gender identity to anti-discrimination laws.

In 2013, Sinema co-sponsored Representative Sean Patrick Maloney's letter, which opposed Saudi Arabia for "the use of torture and capital punishment against the LGBTQ community".

In December 2022, Sinema was a lead cosponsor and negotiator on the Respect for Marriage Act, which passed the Senate with a 61–36 vote.

=== Immigration ===
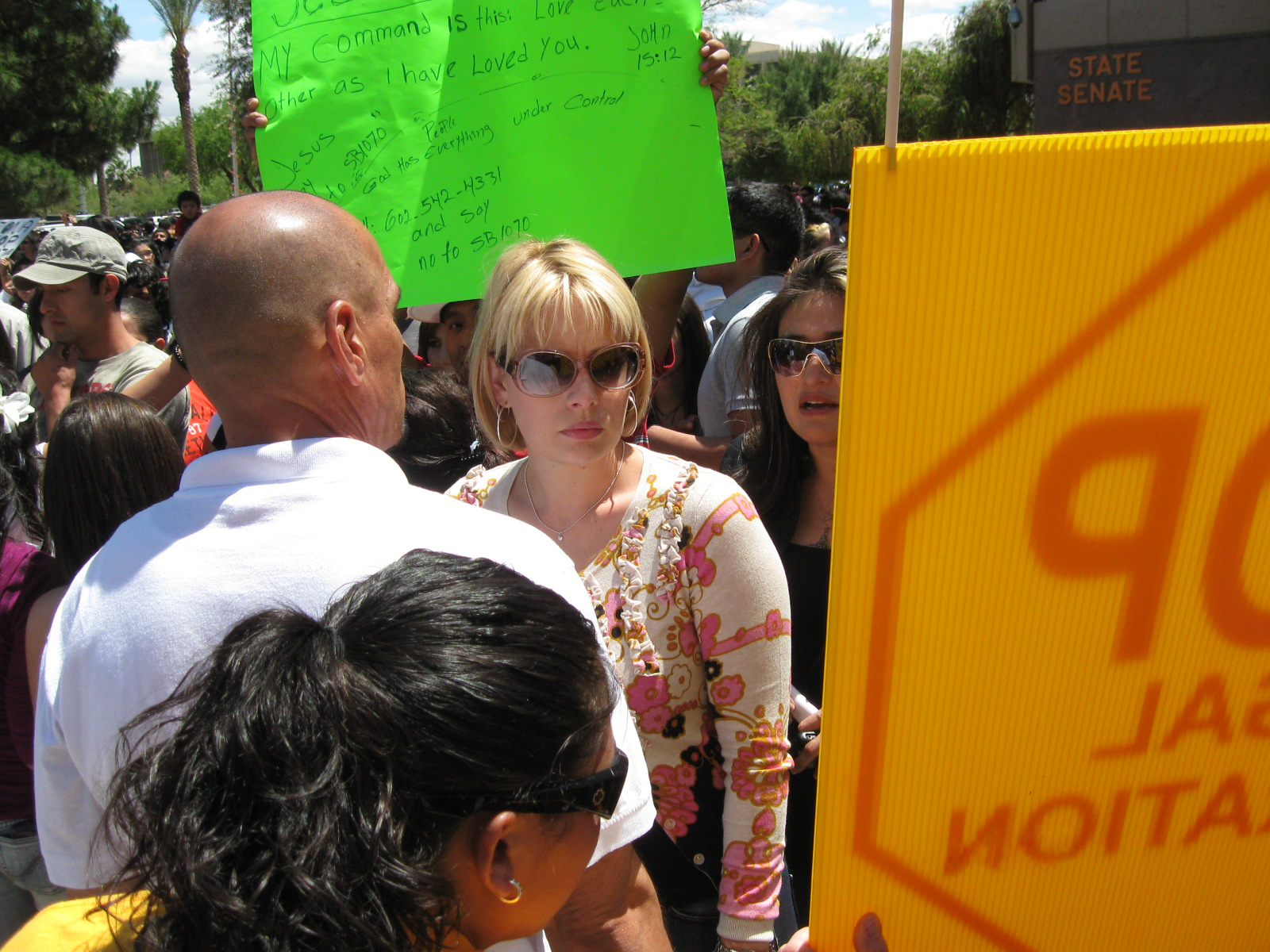
Sinema, then a state representative, attending a protest at the Arizona State Capitol on the day of the SB 1070's signing

Sinema co-sponsored the Southwest Border Security Threat Assessment Act (H.R. 4482), a bill that calls for border threat analysis of terrorism, smuggling, and human trafficking every five years.

Sinema was one of 24 House Democrats to vote in favor of Kate's Law, a bill that would expand maximum sentences for foreigners who attempt to reenter the country, legally or illegally, after having been deported, denied entry or removed, and for foreign felons who attempt to reenter the country.

Sinema voted for the SAFE Act, which expanded the refugee screening process to require signatures from the secretary of homeland security, the director of the Federal Bureau of Investigation, and the director of national intelligence for each refugee entering the country.

Sinema opposed Arizona SB 1070. She has argued that mass deportation of undocumented immigrants is not an option and supported the DREAM Act. Her 2012 campaign website stated that "we need to create a tough but fair path to citizenship for undocumented workers that requires them to get right with the law by paying back taxes, paying a fine and learning English as a condition of gaining citizenship." In July 2018, she broke with her party by voting with Republicans against abolishing ICE.

The Federation for American Immigration Reform, a PAC that seeks to limit both legal and illegal immigration, gave Sinema a 33% rating in 2018, and UnidosUS, which supports a pathway to citizenship for undocumented immigrants, gave Sinema a score of 88% in 2014.

On March 14, 2019, Sinema voted against Trump's National Emergency declaration on border security.

On February 4, 2021, Sinema voted against providing COVID-19 pandemic financial support to undocumented immigrants.

=== Privacy ===
In June 2013, Sinema became one of 29 original cosponsors of the bipartisan LIBERT-E (Limiting Internet and Blanket Electronic Review of Telecommunications and Email) Act, along with Representative Justin Amash. The legislation would limit the National Security Agency (NSA) to only collecting electronic information from subjects of an investigation.

In July 2013, Sinema joined a bipartisan majority and voted against an amendment to a defense appropriations bill (offered by Amash) to prohibit the NSA from monitoring and recording details of U.S. citizens' telecommunications without a warrant.

=== Senate filibuster ===
Early in her career, Sinema expressed enthusiasm about evading the Senate filibuster through the reconciliation process.

On January 25, 2021, a spokesperson for Sinema told The Washington Post that she is "against eliminating the filibuster" and "not open to changing her mind" on the issue. Additionally, Sinema has spoken out on the elimination of the judicial filibuster as a key reason for increased politicization of the judiciary.

In January 2022, Sinema and Democratic Senate colleague Joe Manchin voted against changing the Senate filibuster rule. The proposed rule change, which would have allowed certain voting rights bills to advance to the Senate floor without meeting the Senate's 60-vote threshold, was voted down by a 52–48 margin. Days later, the Arizona Democratic Party executive committee censured Sinema for voting to retain the filibuster rule.

=== Telecommunications ===
In 2016, Sinema was one of five House Democrats to vote for a Republican-backed bill barring the Federal Communications Commission (FCC) from regulating broadband rates. Her vote broke from her party; other Democrats were strongly opposed to the measure, and President Obama said he would veto it if it passed.

In 2019, Sinema was the sole Senate Democrat not to co-sponsor the Save the Internet Act, which would restore Obama-era regulations preventing ISPs from throttling consumers' website traffic. She worked with Senate Republican Roger Wicker to develop their own net neutrality bill.

== Personal life ==
Sinema married, and later divorced, her BYU classmate Blake Dain. She is openly bisexual. She had been reported to be the only atheist member of Congress, although she has rejected the label.

In late 2025, an alienation of affection lawsuit was filed against Sinema for pursuing a relationship with her married bodyguard, Matthew Ammel, which became broader public knowledge in January 2026, when the case was moved to federal court. In March 2026, Sinema acknowledged that she had an affair with her bodyguard while she was in office.

=== Amateur athlete ===
Sinema has completed numerous marathons. In 2019, she completed a marathon in 3:28:17, which was fast enough for her (female) age group to qualify for the Boston Marathon. Two weeks before her Boston-qualifying race, she ran a three-mile race in 20:42, setting a record for women in Congress. In 2020, she set a personal record of 3:21:45 and later in 2021, she broke her right foot while running a marathon, requiring her to use a hands-free crutch.

On November 17, 2013, Sinema completed an Ironman Triathlon in a little over 15 hours. She was the second active member of Congress, after Senator Jeff Merkley, to finish a long-distance triathlon, and the first to complete an Ironman-branded race. She completed the 2015 Ironman World Championship in Kona, Hawaii.

== Selected works ==
- Sinema, Kyrsten (2009). Unite and Conquer: How to Build Coalitions That Win and Last. Berrett-Koehler Publishers. ISBN 9781605090054.
- Sinema, Kyrsten (2015). Who Must Die in Rwanda's Genocide?: The State of Exception Realized. Lexington Books. ISBN 9781498518659.

== See also ==
- List of LGBT firsts by year (2010s)
- List of LGBT members of the United States Congress
- List of United States senators who switched parties
- Women in the United States House of Representatives
- Women in the United States Senate

U.S. House of Representatives
New constituency	Member of the U.S. House of Representatives from Arizona's 9th congressional district 2013–2019	Succeeded by Greg Stanton
Party political offices
Preceded by Richard Carmona	Democratic nominee for U.S. Senator from Arizona (Class 1); 2018	Succeeded by Ruben Gallego
U.S. Senate
Preceded by Jeff Flake	U.S. Senator (Class 1) from Arizona; 2019–2025; Served alongside: Martha McSally, Mark Kelly	Succeeded by Ruben Gallego
U.S. order of precedence (ceremonial)
Preceded by Jeff Flake as Former U.S. Senator	Order of precedence of the United States as Former U.S. Senator	Succeeded by Mark Begich as Former U.S. Senator
