= Jeff Farias =

- Born: Fall River, Massachusetts, U.S.
- Education: Graduation from Brown University (1982); BA in organizational behavior management
- Occupations: Radio host and producer

Jeff Farias is a progressive talk-show radio host and producer. Born in Fall River, Massachusetts, he graduated from Brown University in 1982 with a BA in organizational behavior management.

== Television career ==
After college, Farias worked in New York City as a researcher for the A&E documentary series "The Eagle and The Bear", which looked at the history of US-Soviet relations through the prism of the Cold War. 52 episodes aired on A&E. He also worked as a researcher on an episode of Dateline about the 1989 Tiananmen Square protests and massacre.

== Radio career ==
In October 2003, Farias joined the Howard Dean presidential campaign as an aide and met physician and radio personality Mike Newcomb. Newcomb, at the time affiliated with Nova M Radio, had a radio talk show called "the Dr. Mike Show". That meeting led Farias to a job as the producer for "the Dr. Mike Show", at KFNX, out of Arizona. from June 2004 to April 2005.

In 2005, Farias moved to the new Air America Radio station featured at KXXT where he was given a weekend show called the "Truth to Power Hour", which he co-hosted with Arizona state Representative Kyrsten Sinema. In 2007, when KXXT was sold to a Christian broadcasting station, KPHX, Jeff became Head of Production.

In March 2007, Farias was given the afternoon drive slot at KPHX, "The Jeff Farias Show", a progressive radio show. Farias, as a talk show host, interviewed many political figures, including Scott Ritter, Mike Malloy, Cindy Sheehan, Rev. Lennox Yearwood, Medea Benjamin, and celebrities including Manuel Rivera-Ortiz.

In October 2008, on the eve of the Obama-McCain election, Farias, an old school democrat living in John McCain's home state became involved in a minor controversy. Media accounts differ, but either Farias left his position or was fired from Nova M Radio due to political disputes or mismanagement.

Shortly after, Farias reemerged with Roots Up Radio, an online radio station out of Madison, Wisconsin. The station currently airs the Jeff Farias Show weekly.
