= Canadian Journal of African Studies =

- Discipline: African studies
- Language: English, French
- Edited by: Belinda Dodson

Publication details
- History: 1967-present
- Publisher: Taylor & Francis on behalf of the Canadian Association of African Studies (Canada)
- Frequency: Triannually

Standard abbreviations
- ISO 4: Can. J. Afr. Stud.

Indexing
- ISSN: 0008-3968 (print); 1923-3051 (web)
- LCCN: 79018614
- JSTOR: 00083968
- OCLC no.: 51205190

Links
- Journal homepage; Journal page at University of Alberta

The Canadian Journal of African Studies is a triannual peer-reviewed academic journal covering African studies that was established in 1967. It is published by the Canadian Association of African Studies. Articles are published in English or French and cover the areas of anthropology, political economy, history, geography, and development. In addition to "Research Articles", the journal includes a section called "Debate and Commentary" that presents divergent viewpoints on current issues. Another section called "Research Note" permits contributors to discuss the latest writing, opinion, and research sources on African issues. A book review and review essay section provides critiques of recent books and reports.

In 2009, the journal added an online format at the University of Alberta. In 2012, publication moved to Taylor & Francis. Back issues are available online at JSTOR.
