= The Progressive Populist =

The Progressive Populist is a magazine in tabloid newspaper format published monthly. Founded in 1995, the magazine is based in Storm Lake, Iowa, with editorial offices in Manchaca, Texas. The editor is James M. Cullen, managing editor is Art Cullen and the publisher is John Cullen.

The magazine labels itself as "A Journal from America's Heartland." It deals with political and economic topics of interest to "workers, small businesses, and family farmers and ranchers"; according to its "About" page, the journal "report[s] on issues of interest to the middle class of America."

The magazine publishes original and syndicated columns of progressive journalists and pundits.

The magazine premiered in November 1995 as a monthly tabloid publication. In October 1999 it expanded to twice-monthly publication, supplemented with a website and a blog. In May 2025, the newsprint magazine returned to a monthly publication cycle supplemented by weekly digital updates.

From October 31, 2010, to February 2, 2012, The Progressive Populist had a partnership with Vicki Nikolaidis to produce an Internet radio show via Blogtalkradio. For the first two editions of the program, held on October 31 and November 11, the show was called The Progressive Politics Show and was hosted on Asnycnow Radio One. The show was renamed Talking Progressive Politics and moved to the Populist's BTR service since November 17, 2010. The final show associated with the Populist aired on January 5, 2012, and the show continued until its final broadcast on February 2, 2012. The show has since been canceled. All past broadcasts have been pulled from Blogtalkradio and Vicki Nikolaidis has moved on to the Politics Daily show with BostonRed.
