= Wally Straughn =

American politician

Member of the Arizona House of Representatives from the 15th district
- In office January 13, 2003 – January 10, 2005 Serving with Ken Clark
- Preceded by: Mike Gleason; Robert Blendu
- Succeeded by: Kyrsten Sinema; David Lujan

Personal details
- Born: 1957 (age 68–69) Portsmouth, Virginia
- Party: Democratic
- Spouse: Benjamin Rolfe-Kizer (1990–2017)

Wally Straughn (born 1957) is an American politician, who served as a Democratic member of the Arizona House of Representatives from 2003 to 2005.

A United States Navy veteran who served in the Vietnam War, he was first elected in the 2002 election as a member of the Democratic Party. He served on the legislature's Commerce and Military Affairs, Public Institutions and Counties, and Judiciary committees during his term in office. Openly gay, he was an outspoken supporter of efforts to legalize same-sex marriage in Arizona.

Straughn was defeated in the 2004 primaries by Kyrsten Sinema and David Lujan, and did not return to elected politics thereafter.
