= David Lujan =

American politician

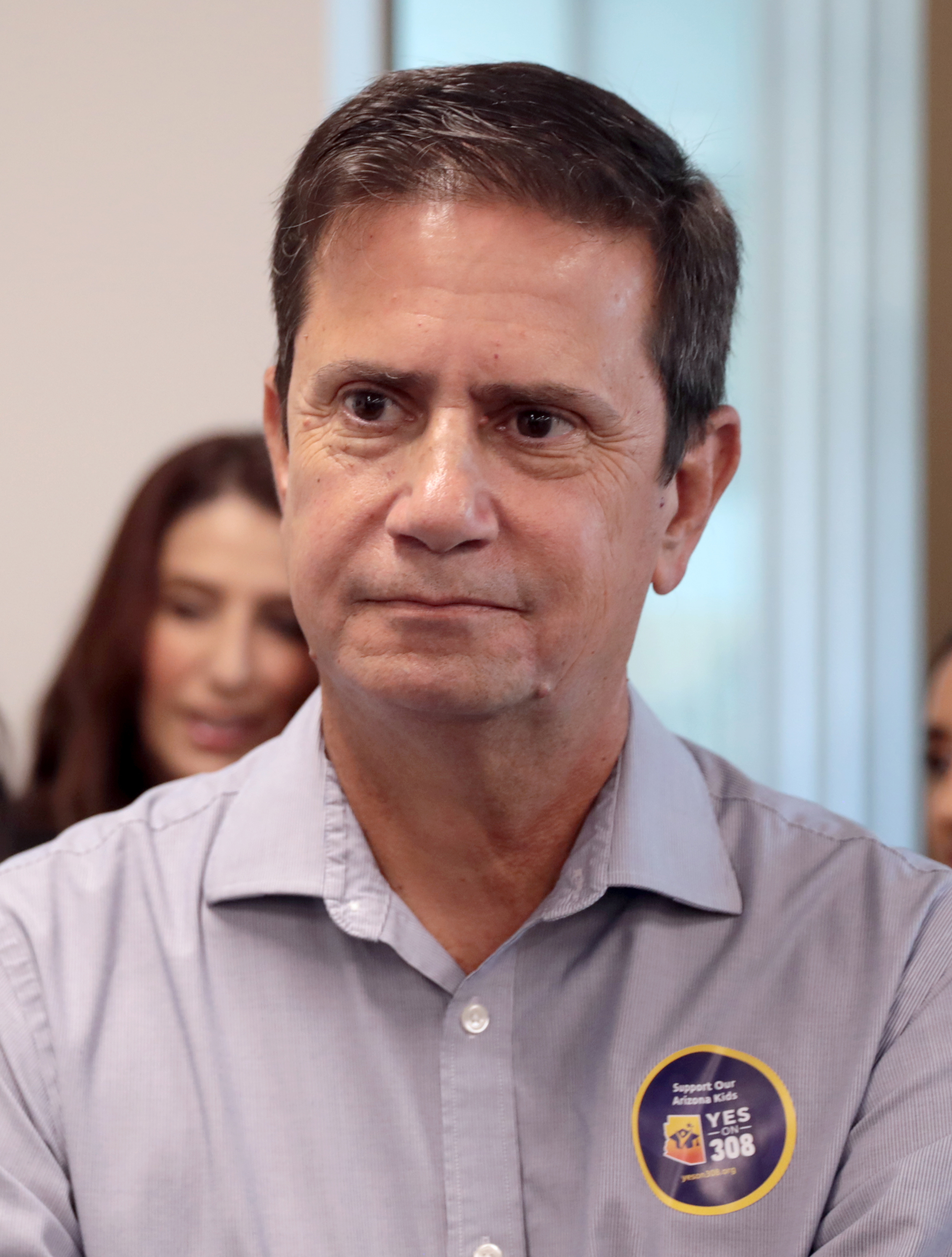
- Lujan in 2022

Member of the Arizona Senate from the 15th district
- In office January 2012 – January 2013
- Preceded by: Kyrsten Sinema
- Succeeded by: Nancy Barto

Member of the Arizona House of Representatives from the 15th district
- In office January 2005 – January 2011 Serving with Kyrsten Sinema
- Preceded by: Wally Straughn; Ken Clark
- Succeeded by: Katie Hobbs; Lela Alston

Personal details
- Born: April 7, 1965 (age 61)
- Party: Democratic
- Education: Arizona State University

David Lujan (born April 7, 1965) is an American politician who served in the Arizona legislature from 2005 until 2013. He was first elected to the Arizona House of Representatives in 2004 representing most of the central Phoenix area. He served a total of three terms in the House from 2005 until 2011, and one partial term in the Senate from 2012 to 2013. He was the House Minority Leader from 2009 to 2011. While in the House of Representatives, Lujan was the Ranking Democrat on the House Education committee and served on the Appropriations committee. Lujan received many awards while serving in the Arizona legislature, including being named Public Official of the Year by the National Association of Social Workers.

== Career ==
For most of the time he served in the legislature, Lujan also held a second elected office, serving as a school board member for the Phoenix Union High School District. He was first elected to the school board in 2002 and he was re-elected to a second four-year term in 2006. He served as Board President from 2007 to 2008. Upon becoming Board President, Lujan lead efforts to unanimously pass a resolution urging Congress to pass the Dream Act, providing a pathway to citizenship for undocumented immigrant students. At the time, the Phoenix Union Board was one of the first elected bodies in Arizona to pass such a resolution.

In 2010, Lujan was narrowly defeated in the Democratic primary when he ran to be Arizona's Attorney General in the Arizona 2010 election.

Lujan became an Arizona State Senator on January 11, 2012 when he was appointed by the Maricopa County Board of Supervisors to complete the term of Kyrsten Sinema who resigned to run for the United States Congress.

In August 2013, Lujan ran unsuccessfully for a seat on the Phoenix City Council.

Lujan is an attorney. While he served in the Arizona legislature from 2005 to 2010, he was the staff attorney for Defenders of Children, a nonprofit advocacy group that provides legal services to assist children who are victims of abuse. From 2011 to 2014, he was the Chief Administrator for ASU Preparatory Academy, a college preparatory charter school serving Kindergarten through 12th grade in downtown Phoenix.

From 2020 to 2023, Lujan was the president and CEO of Children's Action Alliance, a nonprofit, nonpartisan organization advocating for better policies for children and families at the state and federal level. Lujan was with Children's Action Alliance since 2016 and previously led their affiliate, the Arizona Center for Economic Progress.

On March 6, 2023, Governor Katie Hobbs appointed Lujan as the director of the Arizona Department of Child Safety.
