= Ken Clark (politician) =

American politician

Member of the Arizona House of Representatives from the 24th district
- In office January 5, 2015 – January 14, 2019 Serving with Lela Alston
- Succeeded by: Amish Shah

Member of the Arizona House of Representatives from the 15th district
- In office January 2003 – January 2005 Serving with Wally Straughn

Personal details
- Party: Democratic
- Education: Northern Arizona University
- Profession: Real estate agent
- Website: kenclarkforaz.org

Ken Clark is an American politician who served as a Democratic member of the Arizona House of Representatives representing District 24 from 2015 to 2019.

== Elections ==
- 2014 – Ken Clark and Lela Alston defeated Richard Bauer in the Democratic primary. Alston and Clark defeated Lei Lani Cortez in the general election.
- 2010 – Clark was defeated by Lela Alston and Katie Hobbs in the Democratic primary election on August 24, 2010.
