= 38th Arizona State Legislature =

Session of the Arizona Legislature

←	37th	39th	→
- Arizona State Capitol (2014)

Overview
- Legislative body: Arizona State Legislature
- Jurisdiction: Arizona, United States
- Term: January 1, 1987 – December 31, 1988

Senate
- Members: 30
- Party control: Republican (19–11)

House of Representatives
- Members: 60
- Party control: Republican (36–24)

Sessions
- 1st: January 12 – May 19, 1987
- 2nd: January 11 – July 1, 1988

Special sessions
- 1st: January 21 – January 25, 1987
- 2nd: June 29 – July 1, 1987
- 3rd: July 20 – July 22, 1987

The 38th Arizona State Legislature, consisting of the Arizona State Senate and the Arizona House of Representatives, was constituted in Phoenix from January 1, 1987, to December 31, 1988, during the two years of Evan Mecham's term as Governor of Arizona, and the first year of Rose Mofford's term as governor after Mecham's impeachment. Both the Senate and the House membership remained constant at 30 and 60, respectively. The Republicans gained a seat in the Senate, giving them a 19–11 majority, while the Democrats gained to seats in the house, decreasing the Republican majority to 36–24.

== Sessions ==
The Legislature met for two regular sessions at the State Capitol in Phoenix. The first opened on January 12, 1987, and adjourned on May 19, while the Second Regular Session convened on January 11, 1988, and adjourned sine die on July 1.

There were three Special Sessions, the first of which was convened on January 21, 1987, and adjourned on January 25; the second convened on June 29, 1987, and adjourned sine die on July 1; and the third convened on July 20, 1987, and adjourned sine die on July 22.

== State Senate ==
=== Members ===
The asterisk (*) denotes members of the previous Legislature who continued in office as members of this Legislature.

District	Senator	Party	Notes
1	John U. Hays*	Republican	
2	Tony Gabaldon*	Democrat	
3	James Henderson Jr.*	Democrat	
4	A. V. "Bill" Hardt*	Democrat	
5	Jones Osborn*	Democrat	
6	Allen J. Stephens*	Democrat	
7	Peter D. Rios*	Democrat	
8	Carol MacDonald	Republican	
9	Jeffrey J. Hill*	Republican	
10	Jesus Higuera*	Democrat	
11	Jaime P. Gutierrez*	Democrat	
12	John T. Mawhinney*	Republican	
13	Greg Lunn*	Republican	
14	William J. De Long *	Republican	
15	S. H. Runyan*	Republican	
16	Wayne Stump*	Republican	
17	Pat Wright	Republican	
18	Tony West*	Republican	
19	Janice Brewer	Republican	
20	Lela Alston*	Democrat	
21	Carl J. Kunasek*	Republican	
22	Manuel "Lito" Pena*	Democrat	
23	Carolyn Walker	Democrat	
24	Pete Corpstein*	Republican	
25	Jacque Steiner*	Republican	
26	Peter Kay*	Republican	
27	Doug Todd	Republican	
28	Robert B. Usdane*	Republican	
29	Jack J. Taylor*	Republican	
30	James Sossaman	Republican	

== House of Representatives ==
=== Members ===
The asterisk (*) denotes members of the previous Legislature who continued in office as members of this Legislature.

District	Representative	Party	Notes
1	Donald R. Aldridge*	Republican	
1	R. D. Carson	Republican	
2	Karan English	Democrat	
2	John Wettaw*	Republican	
3	Benjamin Hanley*	Democrat	
3	Jack C. Jackson*	Democrat	
4	Jack A. Brown	Democrat	
4	E. C. "Polly" Rosenbaum*	Democrat	
5	Herbert Guenther	Democrat	
5	Robert J. McLendon*	Democrat	
6	Henry Evans*	Democrat	
6	James Hartdegen*	Republican	
7	Roy Hudson*	Democrat	
7	Richard Pacheco*	Democrat	
8	Gus Arzberger*	Democrat	
8	Joe Lane*	Republican	
9	Bart Baker*	Republican	
9	William J. English*	Republican	
10	Carmen Cajero*	Democrat	
10	Phillip Hubbard	Democrat	
11	Peter Goudinoff*	Democrat	
11	John Kromko*	Democrat	
12	Reid Ewing*	Democrat	
12	Jack Jewett*	Republican	
13	David C. Bartlett*	Democrat	
13	Larry Hawke*	Republican	
14	Jim Green*	Republican	
14	Cindy L. Resnick*	Democrat	
15	Bob Denny*	Republican	
15	James B. Ratliff*	Republican	
16	Bob Hungerford*	Republican	
16	Karen Mills	Republican	
17	Brenda Burns	Republican	
17	Sterling Ridge*	Republican	
18	Jane Dee Hull*	Republican	
18	George E. Weisz	Republican	
19	Nancy Wessel*	Republican	
19	Jim White*	Republican	
20	Debbie McCune*	Democrat	
20	Bobby Raymond	Democrat	
21	Robert W. Broughton	Republican	
21	Leslie Whiting Johnson*	Republican	
22	Art Hamilton*	Democrat	
22	Earl V. Wilcox*	Democrat	
23	Sandra D. Kennedy	Democrat	
23	Armando Ruiz*	Democrat	
24	Gary Giordano*	Republican	
24	Chris Herstam*	Republican	
25	John C. King*	Republican	
25	Elizabeth Adams Rockwell*	Republican	
26	Jim Meredith*	Republican	
26	Jim Miller	Republican	
27	Bev Hermon*	Republican	
27	Jenny Norton	Republican	
28	Heinz Hink*	Republican	
28	Jim Skelly*	Republican	
29	Lela Steffey*	Republican	
29	Don Strauch	Republican	
30	Mark Killian*	Republican	
30	William A. Mundell	Republican	
