= 36th Arizona State Legislature =

Session of the Arizona Legislature

| ← | 35th | 37th | → |
- Arizona State Capitol (2014)

Overview
- Legislative body: Arizona State Legislature
- Jurisdiction: Arizona, United States
- Term: January 1, 1983 – December 31, 1984

Senate
- Members: 30
- Party control: Republican (18–12)

House of Representatives
- Members: 60
- Party control: Republican (39–21)

Sessions
- 1st: January 10 – April 27, 1983
- 2nd: January 9 – May 4, 1984

Special sessions
- 1st: October 3, 1983 – January 19, 1984
- 2nd: June 24 – July 5, 1984
- 3rd: July 20 – July 20, 1984

The 36th Arizona State Legislature, consisting of the Arizona State Senate and the Arizona House of Representatives, was constituted in Phoenix from January 1, 1983, to December 31, 1984, during the first two years of Bruce Babbitt's second full term as Governor of Arizona. Both the Senate and the House membership remained constant at 30 and 60, respectively. The Republicans increased their lead in the Senate by two seats, giving them an 18–12 edge in the upper house, while the Democrats gained four seats in the lower house, although the Republicans still held a 39–21 majority.

== Sessions ==
The Legislature met for two regular sessions at the State Capitol in Phoenix. The first opened on January 10, 1983, and adjourned on April 27, while the Second Regular Session convened on January 9, 1984, and adjourned sine die on May 4.

There were three Special Sessions during this legislature. The first convened on October 3, 1983, and adjourned sine die on January 19, 1984; the second convened on June 24, 1984, and adjourned on July 5; the third convened later that same month on July 20 and adjourned sine die later that same day.

== State Senate ==
=== Members ===
The asterisk (*) denotes members of the previous Legislature who continued in office as members of this Legislature.

| District | Senator | Party | Notes |
|---|---|---|---|
| 1 | John U. Hays | Republican | |
| 2 | Tony Gabaldon* | Democrat | |
| 3 | Arthur J. Hubbard Sr.* | Democrat | |
| 4 | A. V. "Bill" Hardt* | Democrat | |
| 5 | Jones Osborn* | Democrat | |
| 6 | Polly Getzwiller* | Democrat | |
| 7 | Peter D. Rios | Democrat | |
| 8 | Ed Sawyer* | Democrat | |
| 9 | Jeffrey J. Hill* | Republican | |
| 10 | Luis A. Gonzales* | Democrat | |
| 11 | Jaime P. Gutierrez* | Democrat | |
| 12 | John T. Mawhinney* | Republican | |
| 13 | Greg Lunn* | Republican | |
| 14 | William J. De Long | Republican | |
| 15 | S. H. Runyan* | Republican | |
| 16 | Wayne Stump | Republican | |
| 17 | Anne Lindeman* | Republican | |
| 18 | Tony West | Republican | |
| 19 | Bill Davis | Republican | |
| 20 | Lela Alston* | Democrat | |
| 21 | Carl J. Kunasek | Republican | |
| 22 | Manuel "Lito" Pena* | Democrat | |
| 23 | Alfredo Gutierrez* | Democrat | |
| 24 | Pete Corpstein | Republican | |
| 25 | Jacque Steiner* | Republican | |
| 26 | Peter Kay* | Republican | |
| 27 | Juanita Harelson | Republican | |
| 28 | Robert B. Usdane* | Republican | |
| 29 | Jack J. Taylor* | Republican | |
| 30 | Stan Turley* | Republican | |

== House of Representatives ==
=== Members ===
The asterisk (*) denotes members of the previous Legislature who continued in office as members of this Legislature.

| District | Representative | Party | Notes |
|---|---|---|---|
| 1 | Donald R. Aldridge | Republican | |
| 1 | Jerry Everall* | Republican | |
| 2 | Sam A. McConnell Jr.* | Republican | |
| 2 | John Wettaw* | Republican | |
| 3 | Benjamin Hanley* | Democrat | |
| 3 | Daniel Peaches* | Republican | |
| 4 | Edward G. Guerrero* | Democrat | |
| 4 | E. C. "Polly" Rosenbaum* | Democrat | |
| 5 | Frank McElhaney* | Democrat | |
| 5 | Robert J. McLendon | Democrat | |
| 6 | Henry Evans | Democrat | |
| 6 | James Hartdegen* | Republican | |
| 7 | Roy Hudson | Democrat | |
| 7 | Richard Pacheco* | Democrat | |
| 8 | Joe Lane* | Republican | |
| 8 | Steve Vukcevich* | Democrat | |
| 9 | Bart Baker* | Republican | |
| 9 | William J. English* | Republican | |
| 10 | Carmen Cajero* | Democrat | |
| 10 | Jesus R. Higuera | Democrat | |
| 11 | Peter Goudinoff* | Democrat | |
| 11 | John Kromko | Democrat | |
| 12 | Pete Hershberger | Republican | |
| 12 | Jack B. Jewett | Republican | |
| 13 | David C. Bartlett | Democrat | |
| 13 | Larry Hawke* | Republican | |
| 14 | Jim Green | Republican | |
| 14 | Cindy L. Resnick | Democrat | |
| 15 | Bob Denny* | Republican | |
| 15 | James B. Ratliff* | Republican | |
| 16 | Bob Hungerford* | Republican | |
| 16 | Rhonda Thomas* | Republican | |
| 17 | Sterling Ridge | Republican | |
| 17 | Patrica D. Wright* | Republican | |
| 18 | Burton S. Barr* | Republican | |
| 18 | Jane Dee Hull** | Republican | |
| 19 | Janice Brewer | Republican | |
| 19 | Nancy Wessel | Republican | |
| 20 | Glenn Davis*** | Democrat | |
| 20 | Debbie McCune* | Democrat | |
| 21 | Henry Haws | Republican | |
| 21 | Leslie Whiting Johnson | Republican | |
| 22 | Art Hamilton* | Democrat | |
| 22 | Earl V. Wilcox* | Democrat | |
| 23 | Armando Ruiz | Democrat | |
| 23 | Carolyn Walker | Democrat | |
| 24 | Chris Herstam | Republican | |
| 24 | Cal Holman* | Republican | |
| 25 | Donald Kenney**** | Republican | |
| 25 | Elizabeth Adams Rockwell**** | Republican | |
| 26 | Frank Kelley | Republican | |
| 26 | Jim Meredith* | Republican | |
| 27 | Bev Hermon | Republican | |
| 27 | Doug Todd* | Republican | |
| 28 | Paul R. Messinger* | Republican | |
| 28 | Jim Skelly* | Republican | |
| 29 | Jim L. Cooper* | Republican | |
| 29 | Lela Steffey | Republican | |
| 30 | Mark Killian | Republican | |
| 30 | James J. Sossaman* | Republican | |

The ** denotes that Hull was the incumbent representative from the 19th district, who moved to the 18th district

The *** denotes that Davis was the incumbent representative from the 25th district, who moved to the 20th district

The **** denotes that Kenney and Rockwell were the incumbent representatives from the 21st district, who moved to the 25th district
