= 37th Arizona State Legislature =

Session of the Arizona Legislature

←	36th	38th	→
- Arizona State Capitol (2014)

Overview
- Legislative body: Arizona State Legislature
- Jurisdiction: Arizona, United States
- Term: January 1, 1985 – December 31, 1986

Senate
- Members: 30
- Party control: Republican (18–12)

House of Representatives
- Members: 60
- Party control: Republican (38–22)

Sessions
- 1st: January 14 – May 8, 1985
- 2nd: January 13 – May 14, 1986

The 37th Arizona State Legislature, consisting of the Arizona State Senate and the Arizona House of Representatives, was constituted in Phoenix from January 1, 1985, to December 31, 1986, during the second two years of Bruce Babbitt's second full term as Governor of Arizona. Both the Senate and the House membership remained constant at 30 and 60, respectively. The composition of the senate remained constant, with the Republicans holding a 18–12, while the Democrats gained a seat in the lower house, decreasing the Republican majority to 38–22.

== Sessions ==
The Legislature met for two regular sessions at the State Capitol in Phoenix. The first opened on January 14, 1985, and adjourned on May 8, while the Second Regular Session convened on January 13, 1986, and adjourned sine die on May 14. There were no special sessions.

== State Senate ==
=== Members ===
The asterisk (*) denotes members of the previous Legislature who continued in office as members of this Legislature.

District	Senator	Party	Notes
1	John U. Hays	Republican	
2	Tony Gabaldon*	Democrat	
3	James Henderson Jr.	Democrat	
4	A. V. "Bill" Hardt*	Democrat	
5	Jones Osborn*	Democrat	
6	Allen J. Stephens	Democrat	
7	Peter D. Rios*	Democrat	
8	Ed Sawyer*	Democrat	
9	Jeffrey J. Hill*	Republican	
10	Luis A. Gonzales*	Democrat	
11	Jaime P. Gutierrez*	Democrat	
12	John T. Mawhinney*	Republican	
13	Greg Lunn*	Republican	
14	William J. De Long *	Republican	
15	S. H. Runyan*	Republican	
16	Wayne Stump*	Republican	
17	Anne Lindeman*	Republican	
18	Tony West*	Republican	
19	Bill Davis*	Republican	
20	Lela Alston*	Democrat	
21	Carl J. Kunasek*	Republican	
22	Manuel "Lito" Pena*	Democrat	
23	Alfredo Gutierrez*	Democrat	
24	Pete Corpstein*	Republican	
25	Jacque Steiner*	Republican	
26	Peter Kay*	Republican	
27	Juanita Harelson*	Republican	
28	Robert B. Usdane*	Republican	
29	Jack J. Taylor*	Republican	
30	Stan Turley*	Republican	

== House of Representatives ==
=== Members ===
The asterisk (*) denotes members of the previous Legislature who continued in office as members of this Legislature.

District	Representative	Party	Notes
1	Donald R. Aldridge*	Republican	
1	R. D. Carson	Republican	
2	Sam A. McConnell Jr.*	Republican	
2	John Wettaw*	Republican	
3	Benjamin Hanley*	Democrat	
3	Jack C. Jackson	Democrat	
4	Edward G. Guerrero*	Democrat	
4	E. C. "Polly" Rosenbaum*	Democrat	
5	Frank McElhaney*	Democrat	
5	Robert J. McLendon*	Democrat	
6	Henry Evans*	Democrat	
6	James Hartdegen*	Republican	
7	Roy Hudson*	Democrat	
7	Richard Pacheco*	Democrat	
8	Gus Arzberger	Democrat	
8	Joe Lane*	Republican	
9	Bart Baker*	Republican	
9	William J. English*	Republican	
10	Carmen Cajero*	Democrat	
10	Jesus R. Higuera*	Democrat	
11	Peter Goudinoff*	Democrat	
11	John Kromko*	Democrat	
12	Reid Ewing	Democrat	
12	E. D. Jewett Jr.*	Republican	
13	David C. Bartlett	Democrat	
13	Larry Hawke*	Republican	
14	Jim Green*	Republican	
14	Cindy L. Resnick*	Democrat	
15	Bob Denny*	Republican	
15	James B. Ratliff*	Republican	
16	Bob Hungerford*	Republican	
16	Karen Mills	Republican	
17	Sterling Ridge*	Republican	
17	Patrica D. Wright*	Republican	
18	Burton S. Barr*	Republican	
18	Jane Dee Hull**	Republican	
19	Janice Brewer*	Republican	
19	Nancy Wessel*	Republican	
20	Trent Franks	Republican	
20	Debbie McCune*	Democrat	
21	Henry Haws	Republican	
21	Leslie Whiting Johnson*	Republican	
22	Art Hamilton*	Democrat	
22	Earl V. Wilcox*	Democrat	
23	Armando Ruiz*	Democrat	
23	Carolyn Walker*	Democrat	
24	Gary Giordano	Republican	
24	Chris Herstam*	Republican	
25	John C. King	Republican	
25	Elizabeth Adams Rockwell*	Republican	
26	Frank Kelley*	Republican	
26	Jim Meredith*	Republican	
27	Bev Hermon*	Republican	
27	Doug Todd*	Republican	
28	Heinz Hink	Republican	
28	Jim Skelly*	Republican	
29	Jim L. Cooper*	Republican	
29	Lela Steffey*	Republican	
30	Mark Killian*	Republican	
30	James J. Sossaman*	Republican	
