= 35th Arizona State Legislature =

Session of the Arizona Legislature

←	34th	36th	→
- Arizona State Capitol (2014)

Overview
- Legislative body: Arizona State Legislature
- Jurisdiction: Arizona, United States
- Term: January 1, 1981 – December 31, 1982

Senate
- Members: 30
- Party control: Republican (16–14)

House of Representatives
- Members: 60
- Party control: Republican (43–17)

Sessions
- 1st: January 12 – April 25, 1981
- 2nd: January 11 – April 24, 1982

Special sessions
- 1st: July 7 – September 4, 1981
- 2nd: July 8 – July 25, 1981
- 3rd: September 1 – September 3, 1981
- 4th: November 9 – November 9, 1981
- 5th: December 1, 1981 – May 19, 1982
- 6th: December 1, 1981 – May 19, 1982
- 7th: December 1 – December 7, 1981

The 35th Arizona State Legislature, consisting of the Arizona State Senate and the Arizona House of Representatives, was constituted in Phoenix from January 1, 1981, to December 31, 1982, during the second two years of Bruce Babbitt's first full term as Governor of Arizona. Both the Senate and the House membership remained constant at 30 and 60, respectively. The Republicans maintained their 16–14 edge in the upper house, and gained a seat in the lower house, increasing their majority there to 43–17.

== Sessions ==
The Legislature met for two regular sessions at the State Capitol in Phoenix. The first opened on January 12, 1981, and adjourned on April 25, while the Second Regular Session convened on January 11, 1982, and adjourned sine die on April 24. There were seven Special Sessions during this legislature. The first convened on July 7, 1981, and adjourned sine die on September 4; the second convened on July 8, 1981, and adjourned seventeen days later on July 25; the third convened that same year on September 1 and adjourned sine die on September 3; the fourth convened on November 9, 1981, at 9:00 in the morning, and adjourned that same day at 4:24 in the afternoon; the fifth and sixth special sessions were held concurrently from December 1, 1981, through January 11, 1982; the seventh and final special session convened on December 1, 1981, and adjourned later that month on December 7.

== State Senate ==
=== Members ===
The asterisk (*) denotes members of the previous Legislature who continued in office as members of this Legislature.

District	Senator	Party	Notes
1	Boyd Tenney*	Republican	
2	Tony Gabaldon*	Democrat	
3	Arthur J. Hubbard Sr.*	Democrat	
4	A. V. "Bill" Hardt*	Democrat	
5	Jones Osborn*	Democrat	
6	Polly Getzwiller*	Democrat	
7	William L. Swink*	Democrat	
8	Ed Sawyer*	Democrat	
9	Jeffrey J. Hill*	Republican	
10	Luis A. Gonzales*	Democrat	
11	Jaime P. Gutierrez*	Democrat	
12	John T. Mawhinney*	Republican	
13	Greg Lunn	Republican	
14	Jim Kolbe*	Republican	
15	S. H. Runyan*	Republican	
16	Marcia G. Weeks	Democrat	
17	Anne Lindeman*	Republican	
18	Leo Corbet*	Republican	
19	Ray Rottas*	Republican	
20	Lela Alston*	Democrat	
21	Richard Kimball*	Democrat	
22	Manuel "Lito" Pena*	Democrat	
23	Alfredo Gutierrez*	Democrat	
24	John C. Pritzlaff Jr.*	Republican	
25	Jacque Steiner	Republican	
26	Peter Kay	Republican	
27	James A. Mack*	Republican	
28	Robert B. Usdane*	Republican	
29	Jack J. Taylor*	Republican	
30	Stan Turley*	Republican	

== House of Representatives ==
=== Members ===
The asterisk (*) denotes members of the previous Legislature who continued in office as members of this Legislature.

District	Representative	Party	Notes
1	Jerry Everall*	Republican	
1	John U. Hays*	Republican	
2	Sam A. McConnell Jr.*	Republican	
2	John Wettaw*	Republican	
3	Benjamin Hanley*	Democrat	
3	Daniel Peaches*	Republican	
4	Edward G. Guerrero*	Democrat	
4	E. C. "Polly" Rosenbaum*	Democrat	
5	Morris Courtright	Republican	
5	Frank McElhaney	Democrat	
6	James Hartdegen*	Republican	
6	Renz D. Jennings*	Democrat	
7	George W. Kline	Republican	
7	Richard Pacheco*	Democrat	
8	Joe Lane*	Republican	
8	Steve Vukcevich*	Democrat	
9	Bart Baker*	Republican	
9	William J. English*	Republican	
10	Carmen Cajero*	Democrat	
10	Jesus R. Higuera	Democrat	
11	Peter Goudinoff*	Democrat	
11	Mike Morales*	Republican	
12	Thomas N. Goodwin*	Republican	
12	E. D. Jewett Jr.	Republican	
13	Clare Dunn**	Democrat	
13	Larry Hawke*	Republican	
14	William J. De Long	Republican	
14	E. H. Lew Macy	Republican	
15	Bob Denny*	Republican	
15	James B. Ratliff*	Republican	
16	Bob Hungerford*	Republican	
16	Rhonda Thomas	Republican	
17	C. W. "Bill" Lewis*	Republican	
17	Patrica D. Wright*	Republican	
18	Burton S. Barr*	Republican	
18	Pete Dunn*	Republican	
19	Jane D. Hull*	Republican	
19	W. A. "Tony" West Jr.*	Republican	
20	Lillian Jordan*	Republican	
20	Debbie McCune*	Democrat	
21	Donald Kenney*	Republican	
21	Elizabeth Adams Rockwell*	Republican	
22	Art Hamilton*	Democrat	
22	Earl V. Wilcox*	Democrat	
23	Tony R. Abril*	Democrat	
23	Leon Thompson*	Democrat	
24	Pete Corpstein*	Republican	
24	Cal Holman*	Republican	
25	Glenn Davis	Democrat	
25	D. Lee Jones*	Republican	
26	Peter Kay*	Republican	
26	Jim Meredith	Republican	
27	Juanita Harelson*	Republican	
27	Doug Todd*	Republican	
28	Paul R. Messinger	Republican	
28	Jim Skelly*	Republican	
29	Donna J. Carlson*	Republican	
29	Jim L. Cooper*	Republican	
30	Carl J. Kunasek*	Republican	
30	James J. Sossaman*	Republican	

The ** denotes that she died in office on July 30, 1981, and was replaced by the appointment of David M. Rodriguez
