= 34th Arizona State Legislature =

Session of the Arizona Legislature

←	33rd	35th	→
- Arizona State Capitol (2014)

Overview
- Legislative body: Arizona State Legislature
- Jurisdiction: Arizona, United States
- Term: January 1, 1979 – December 31, 1980

Senate
- Members: 30
- Party control: Republican (16–14)

House of Representatives
- Members: 60
- Party control: Republican (42–18)

Sessions
- 1st: January 8 – April 21, 1979
- 2nd: January 14 – May 1, 1980

Special sessions
- 1st: July 2, 1979 – July 2, 1979
- 2nd: November 12, 1979 – April 3, 1980
- 3rd: June 10, 1980 – June 10, 1980
- 4th: June 11, 1980 (10 A.M.) – June 11, 1980 (4:39 P.M.)
- 5th: June 11, 1980 (5:00 P.M.) – June 11, 1980 (6:15 P.M.)

The 34th Arizona State Legislature, consisting of the Arizona State Senate and the Arizona House of Representatives, was constituted in Phoenix from January 1, 1979, to December 31, 1980, during the first two years of Bruce Babbitt's first full term as Governor of Arizona. Both the Senate and the House membership remained constant at 30 and 60, respectively. The Republicans managed to regain control of the Senate by picking up two seats, giving them a 16–14 edge in the upper house. In the lower chamber, the Republicans increased their majority by 4 seats, giving them a 42–18 margin.

== Sessions ==
The Legislature met for two regular sessions at the State Capitol in Phoenix. The first opened on January 8, 1979, and adjourned on April 21, while the Second Regular Session convened on January 14, 1980, and adjourned sine die on May 1. There was a single special sessions which convened on November 12, 1979, and adjourned sine die on April 3, 1980.

== State Senate ==
=== Members ===
The asterisk (*) denotes members of the previous Legislature who continued in office as members of this Legislature.

District	Senator	Party	Notes
1	Boyd Tenney*	Republican	
2	Tony Gabaldon	Democrat	
3	Arthur J. Hubbard Sr.*	Democrat	
4	A. V. "Bill" Hardt*	Democrat	
5	Jones Osborn*	Democrat	
6	Polly Getzwiller*	Democrat	
7	William L. Swink*	Democrat	
8	Ed Sawyer*	Democrat	
9	Jeffrey J. Hill	Republican	
10	Luis A. Gonzales	Democrat	
11	Jaime P. Gutierrez	Democrat	
12	John T. Mawhinney	Republican	
13	Morris Farr*	Democrat	
14	Jim Kolbe*	Republican	
15	S. H. Runyan*	Republican	
16	Wayne Stump	Republican	
17	Anne Lindeman*	Republican	
18	Leo Corbet*	Republican	
19	Ray Rottas*	Republican	
20	Lela Alston*	Democrat	
21	Richard Kimball	Democrat	
22	Manuel "Lito" Pena*	Democrat	
23	Alfredo Gutierrez*	Democrat	
24	John C. Pritzlaff Jr.*	Republican	
25	Trudy Camping*	Republican	
26	Rod J. McMullin*	Republican	
27	James A. Mack*	Republican	
28	Robert B. Usdane*	Republican	
29	Jack J. Taylor*	Republican	
30	Stan Turley*	Republican	

== House of Representatives ==
=== Members ===
The asterisk (*) denotes members of the previous Legislature who continued in office as members of this Legislature.

District	Representative	Party	Notes
1	Jerry Everall	Republican	
1	John U. Hays*	Republican	
2	Sam A. McConnell Jr.*	Republican	
2	John Wettaw*	Republican	
3	Benjamin Hanley*	Democrat	
3	Daniel Peaches*	Republican	
4	Edward G. Guerrero*	Democrat	
4	E. C. "Polly" Rosenbaum*	Democrat	
5	Morris Courtright	Republican	
5	Frank McElhaney	Democrat	
6	James Hartdegen*	Republican	
6	Renz D. Jennings	Democrat	
7	Marjory Ollson	Democrat	
7	Richard Pacheco*	Democrat	
8	Joe Lane	Republican	
8	Steve Vukcevich*	Democrat	
9	Bart Baker	Republican	
9	William J. English*	Republican	
10	Larry Bahill*	Democrat	
10	Carmen Cajero*	Democrat	
11	Peter Goudinoff*	Democrat	
11	Mike Morales	Republican	
12	Thomas N. Goodwin*	Republican	
12	John Kromko*	Democrat	
13	Clare Dunn*	Democrat	
13	Larry Hawke*	Republican	
14	Arnold Jeffers*	Republican	
14	Ralph Soelter	Republican	
15	Bob Denny	Republican	
15	James B. Ratliff*	Republican	
16	Bob Hungerford	Republican	
16	Diane B. McCarthy*	Republican	
17	C. W. "Bill" Lewis*	Republican	
17	Patrica D. Wright*	Republican	
18	Burton S. Barr*	Republican	
18	Pete Dunn*	Republican	
19	Jane D. Hull	Republican	
19	W. A. "Tony" West Jr.*	Republican	
20	Lillian Jordan*	Republican	
20	Debbie McCune	Democrat	
21	Donald Kenney*	Republican	
21	Elizabeth Adams Rockwell*	Republican	
22	Art Hamilton*	Democrat	
22	Earl V. Wilcox*	Democrat	
23	Tony R. Abril*	Democrat	
23	Leon Thompson*	Democrat	
24	Pete Corpstein*	Republican	
24	Cal Holman*	Republican	
25	D. Lee Jones*	Republican	
25	Jacque Steiner*	Republican	
26	Peter Kay*	Republican	
26	Frank Kelley*	Republican	
27	Juanita Harelson*	Republican	
27	Doug Todd	Republican	
28	David B. Kret	Republican	
28	Jim Skelly**	Republican	
29	Donna J. Carlson*	Republican	
29	Jim L. Cooper*	Republican	
30	Carl J. Kunasek*	Republican	
30	James J. Sossaman*	Republican	
