= 1988 Arizona House of Representatives election =

1988 Arizona House of Representatives elections
- November 8, 1988

All 60 seats in the Arizona House 31 seats needed for a majority
	Majority party	Minority party
Leader	Joe Lane (lost re-nomination)	Art Hamilton
Party	Republican	Democratic
Leader's seat	8th	22nd
Last election	36	24
Seats after	34	26
Seat change	▼2	▲2
Speaker before election
Joe Lane
Republican
Elected Speaker
Jane Dee Hull
Republican

The 1988 Arizona House of Representatives elections were held on November 8, 1988. Voters elected all 60 members of the Arizona House of Representatives in multi-member districts to serve a two-year term. The elections coincided with the elections for other offices, including U.S. Senate, U.S. House, and State Senate. Primary elections were held on September 13, 1988.

The 1988 impeachment and removal of Governor Evan Mecham caused turmoil in Arizona politics and spilt the state Republican Party, resulting in the ouster of many Republican lawmakers who had voted in favor of impeaching Mecham, including Speaker of the House Joe Lane.

Prior to the elections, the Republicans held a majority of 36 seats over the Democrats' 24 seats.

Following the elections, Republicans maintained control of the chamber, though their majority was reduced to 34 Republicans to 26 Democrats, a net gain of two seats for Democrats.

The newly elected members served in the 39th Arizona State Legislature, during which Republican Jane Dee Hull was elected as Speaker of the Arizona House. (Note: Hull was elected as Speaker for the 39th legislature, defeating Democratic Leader Representative Art Hamilton, who was also nominated for Speaker. The vote tally for Speaker was: Hull-34 votes to Hamilton-26 votes.)

In January 1989, Representative Hull became the first woman elected Speaker of the Arizona House of Representatives.

== Retiring Incumbents ==
=== Democrats ===
1. District 7: Roy Hudson
2. District 8: Gus Arzberger (Note: Elected to the Arizona State Senate.)
3. District 12: Reid Ewing (Note: Ran for the Arizona State Senate, but lost to Republican John T. Mawhinney.)
4. District 13: David C. Bartlett (Note: Elected to the Arizona State Senate.)

=== Republicans ===
1. District 13: Larry Hawke
2. District 15: James B. Ratliff
3. District 15: Bob Denny (Note: Elected to the Arizona State Senate.)
4. District 17: Sterling Ridge
5. District 18: George Weisz
6. District 19: Jim White

== Incumbents Defeated in Primary Elections ==
=== Republicans ===
1. District 8: Joe Lane (Speaker)
2. District 16: Bob Hungerford
3. District 21: Bob Broughton
4. District 24: Gary Giordano
5. District 25: Elizabeth Adams Rockwell
6. District 29: Don Strauch

== Incumbents Defeated in General Elections ==
=== Republicans ===
1. District 14: Jim Green
2. District 25: John King

== Summary of Results by Arizona State Legislative District ==
District	Incumbent	Party	Elected Representative	Outcome
1st	Don Aldridge	Rep	Don Aldridge	Rep Hold
1st	Dave Carson	Rep	Dave Carson	Rep Hold
2nd	John Wettaw	Rep	John Wettaw	Rep Hold
2nd	Karan L. English	Dem	Karan L. English	Dem Hold
3rd	Benjamin Hanley	Dem	Benjamin Hanley	Dem Hold
3rd	Jack C. Jackson	Dem	Jack C. Jackson	Dem Hold
4th	E. C. "Polly" Rosenbaum	Dem	E. C. "Polly" Rosenbaum	Dem Hold
4th	Jack A. Brown	Dem	Jack A. Brown	Dem Hold
5th	Robert J. "Bob" McLendon	Dem	Robert J. "Bob" McLendon	Dem Hold
5th	Herb Guenther	Dem	Herb Guenther	Dem Hold
6th	Jim Hartdegen	Rep	Jim Hartdegen	Rep Hold
6th	Henry Evans	Dem	Henry Evans	Dem Hold
7th	Richard "Dick" Pacheco	Dem	Richard "Dick" Pacheco	Dem Hold
7th	Roy Hudson	Dem	Frank "Art" Celaya	Dem Hold
8th	Joe Lane	Rep	Ruben F. Ortega	Dem Gain
8th	Gus Arzberger	Dem	Mike Palmer	Dem Hold
9th	Bill English	Rep	Bill English	Rep Hold
9th	Bart Baker	Rep	Bart Baker	Rep Hold
10th	Carmen Cajero	Dem	Carmen Cajero	Dem Hold
10th	Phillip Hubbard	Dem	Phillip Hubbard	Dem Hold
11th	Peter Goudinoff	Dem	Peter Goudinoff	Dem Hold
11th	John Kromko	Dem	John Kromko	Dem Hold
12th	Jack B. Jewett	Rep	Jack B. Jewett	Rep Hold
12th	Reid Ewing	Dem	Ruth E. Eskesen	Rep Gain
13th	Larry Hawke	Rep	Patricia A. "Patti" Noland	Rep Hold
13th	David C. Bartlett	Dem	Eleanor D. Schorr	Dem Hold
14th	Cindy Resnick	Dem	Cindy Resnick	Dem Hold
14th	Jim Green	Rep	Ruth Solomon	Dem Gain
15th	James B. Ratliff	Rep	Kyle W. Hindman	Rep Hold
15th	Bob Denny	Rep	Bob Williams	Rep Hold
16th	Karen Mills	Rep	Karen Mills	Rep Hold
16th	Bob Hungerford	Rep	Dave McCarroll	Rep Hold
17th	Brenda Burns	Rep	Brenda Burns	Rep Hold
17th	Sterling Ridge	Rep	Robert "Bob" Burns	Rep Hold
18th	Jane Dee Hull	Rep	Jane Dee Hull	Rep Hold
18th	George Weisz	Rep	Susan Gerard	Rep Hold
19th	Nancy Wessel	Rep	Nancy Wessel	Rep Hold
19th	Jim White	Rep	Don Kenney	Rep Hold
20th	Debbie McCune Davis	Dem	Debbie McCune Davis	Dem Hold
20th	Bobby Raymond	Dem	Bobby Raymond	Dem Hold
21st	Leslie Whiting Johnson	Rep	Leslie Whiting Johnson	Rep Hold
21st	Bob Broughton	Rep	Stan Barnes	Rep Hold
22nd	Art Hamilton	Dem	Art Hamilton	Dem Hold
22nd	Earl V. Wilcox	Dem	Earl V. Wilcox	Dem Hold
23rd	Armando Ruiz	Dem	Armando Ruiz	Dem Hold
23rd	Sandra Kennedy	Dem	Sandra Kennedy	Dem Hold
24th	Chris Herstam	Rep	Chris Herstam	Rep Hold
24th	Gary Giordano	Rep	Candice Nagel	Rep Hold
25th	Elizabeth Adams Rockwell	Rep	Sue Laybe	Dem Gain
25th	John King	Rep	Margaret Updike	Rep Hold
26th	Jim Meredith	Rep	Jim Meredith	Rep Hold
26th	Jim Miller	Rep	Jim Miller	Rep Hold
27th	Bev Hermon	Rep	Bev Hermon	Rep Hold
27th	Jenny Norton	Rep	Jenny Norton	Rep Hold
28th	Jim Skelly	Rep	Jim Skelly	Rep Hold
28th	Heinz R. Hink	Rep	Heinz R. Hink	Rep Hold
29th	Lela Steffey	Rep	Lela Steffey	Rep Hold
29th	Don Strauch	Rep	John T. Wrzesinski	Rep Hold
30th	Mark W. Killian	Rep	Mark W. Killian	Rep Hold
30th	William "Bill" Mundell	Rep	William "Bill" Mundell	Rep Hold

== Detailed Results ==
=== District 1 ===
Primary Election Results
Party	Candidate	Votes	%
Democratic Party Primary Results
Democratic	Charles "Gabby" Gabbard (Note: Was a write-in candidate in the primary election.)	137	100.00%
Total votes		137	100.00%
Republican Party Primary Results
Republican	Don Aldridge (incumbent)	11,654	39.04%
Republican	Dave Carson (incumbent)	11,339	37.99%
Republican	Bill M. Hadley	6,856	22.97%
Total votes		29,849	100.00%

General Election Results
Party	Candidate	Votes	%
Republican	Don Aldridge (incumbent)	32,020	51.25%
Republican	Dave Carson (incumbent)	30,457	48.75%
Total votes		62,477	100.00%
Republican hold			
Republican hold			

=== District 2 ===
Primary Election Results
Party	Candidate	Votes	%
Democratic Party Primary Results
Democratic	Karan L. English (incumbent)	7,001	100.00%
Total votes		7,001	100.00%
Republican Party Primary Results
Republican	John Wettaw (incumbent)	7,341	53.76%
Republican	Kirk A. Kennedy	6,315	46.24%
Total votes		13,656	100.00%

General Election Results
Party	Candidate	Votes	%
Republican	John Wettaw (incumbent)	28,163	40.10%
Democratic	Karan L. English (incumbent)	24,595	35.02%
Republican	Kirk A. Kennedy	17,477	24.88%
Total votes		70,235	100.00%
Republican hold			
Democratic hold			

=== District 3 ===
Primary Election Results
Party	Candidate	Votes	%
Democratic Party Primary Results
Democratic	Jack C. Jackson (incumbent)	5,993	39.01%
Democratic	Benjamin Hanley (incumbent)	4,842	31.52%
Democratic	Michael Benson	4,529	29.48%
Total votes		15,364	100.00%
Republican Party Primary Results
Republican	Albert Deschine	53	100.00%
Total votes		53	100.00%

General Election Results
Party	Candidate	Votes	%
Democratic	Jack C. Jackson (incumbent)	15,410	52.39%
Democratic	Benjamin Hanley (incumbent)	14,006	47.61%
Total votes		29,416	100.00%
Democratic hold			
Democratic hold			

=== District 4 ===
Primary Election Results
Party	Candidate	Votes	%
Democratic Party Primary Results
Democratic	E. C. "Polly" Rosenbaum (incumbent)	9,865	40.49%
Democratic	Jack A. Brown (incumbent)	8,883	36.46%
Democratic	Bruce A. Semingson	5,617	23.05%
Total votes		24,365	100.00%
Republican Party Primary Results
Republican	Ginger Williams	3,895	100.00%
Total votes		3,895	100.00%

General Election Results
Party	Candidate	Votes	%
Democratic	Jack A. Brown (incumbent)	16,938	35.85%
Democratic	E. C. "Polly" Rosenbaum (incumbent)	16,578	35.09%
Republican	Ginger Williams	13,732	29.06%
Total votes		47,248	100.00%
Democratic hold			
Democratic hold			

=== District 5 ===
Primary Election Results
Party	Candidate	Votes	%
Democratic Party Primary Results
Democratic	Robert J. "Bob" McLendon (incumbent)	5,875	55.21%
Democratic	Herb Guenther (incumbent)	4,766	44.79%
Total votes		10,641	100.00%
Republican Party Primary Results
Republican	Jess Carroll	266	58.59%
Republican	Tricia Walker	188	41.41%
Total votes		454	100.00%

General Election Results
Party	Candidate	Votes	%
Democratic	Robert J. "Bob" McLendon (incumbent)	16,735	40.75%
Democratic	Herb Guenther (incumbent)	15,123	36.83%
Republican	Jess Carroll	9,209	22.42%
Total votes		41,067	100.00%
Democratic hold			
Democratic hold			

=== District 6 ===
Primary Election Results
Party	Candidate	Votes	%
Democratic Party Primary Results
Democratic	Henry Evans (incumbent)	5,947	100.00%
Total votes		5,947	100.00%
Republican Party Primary Results
Republican	Jim Hartdegen (incumbent)	3,469	50.81%
Republican	Donna Flanigan	3,359	49.19%
Total votes		6,828	100.00%

General Election Results
Party	Candidate	Votes	%
Democratic	Henry Evans (incumbent)	15,992	35.67%
Republican	Jim Hartdegen (incumbent)	15,325	34.18%
Republican	Donna Flanigan	13,518	30.15%
Total votes		44,835	100.00%
Democratic hold			
Republican hold			

=== District 7 ===
Primary Election Results
Party	Candidate	Votes	%
Democratic Party Primary Results
Democratic	Richard "Dick" Pacheco (incumbent)	5,464	26.37%
Democratic	Frank "Art" Celaya	4,706	22.71%
Democratic	William "Bill" Swink	4,492	21.68%
Democratic	Paul D. Graham	3,623	17.49%
Democratic	Porfirio "Pete" Pantoja	2,434	11.75%
Total votes		20,719	100.00%
Republican Party Primary Results
Republican	Norman S. Hill	150	100.00%
Total votes		150	100.00%

General Election Results
Party	Candidate	Votes	%
Democratic	Richard "Dick" Pacheco (incumbent)	18,197	51.04%
Democratic	Frank "Art" Celaya	17,455	48.96%
Total votes		35,652	100.00%
Democratic hold			
Democratic hold			

=== District 8 ===
Primary Election Results
Party	Candidate	Votes	%
Democratic Party Primary Results
Democratic	Mike Palmer	6,065	26.83%
Democratic	Ruben F. Ortega	5,867	25.95%
Democratic	Marland "Honk" Norton	4,186	18.52%
Democratic	Page Bakarich	3,247	14.36%
Democratic	Stephanie Sampson	3,243	14.34%
Total votes		22,608	100.00%
Republican Party Primary Results
Republican	Warren I. Shumaker	2,866	28.85%
Republican	Lloyd J. Fenn	2,854	28.73%
Republican	Joe Lane (incumbent)	2,719	27.37%
Republican	Gerald A. Patton	1,494	15.04%
Total votes		9,933	100.00%

General Election Results
Party	Candidate	Votes	%
Democratic	Ruben F. Ortega	14,703	29.42%
Democratic	Mike Palmer	14,682	29.38%
Republican	Warren I. Shumaker	10,335	20.68%
Republican	Lloyd J. Fenn	10,254	20.52%
Total votes		49,974	100.00%
Democratic hold			
Democratic gain from Republican			

=== District 9 ===
Primary Election Results
Party	Candidate	Votes	%
Democratic Party Primary Results
Democratic	Marion L. Pickens	6,841	100.00%
Total votes		6,841	100.00%
Republican Party Primary Results
Republican	Bill English (incumbent)	7,585	42.29%
Republican	Bart Baker (incumbent)	5,919	33.00%
Republican	James "Jim" F. Vaugh, Sr.	4,432	24.71%
Total votes		17,936	100.00%

General Election Results
Party	Candidate	Votes	%
Republican	Bill English (incumbent)	22,749	35.45%
Republican	Bart Baker (incumbent)	21,106	32.89%
Democratic	Marion L. Pickens	20,314	31.66%
Total votes		64,169	100.00%
Republican hold			
Republican hold			

=== District 10 ===
Primary Election Results
Party	Candidate	Votes	%
Democratic Party Primary Results
Democratic	Carmen Cajero (incumbent)	5,336	59.18%
Democratic	Phillip Hubbard (incumbent)	3,680	40.82%
Total votes		9,016	100.00%
Republican Party Primary Results
Republican	Greg David	1,084	100.00%
Total votes		1,084	100.00%

General Election Results
Party	Candidate	Votes	%
Democratic	Carmen Cajero (incumbent)	12,289	42.33%
Democratic	Phillip Hubbard (incumbent)	10,334	35.60%
Republican	Greg David	4,812	16.58%
People Before Profits (PBP)	Lorenzo Torrez	1,595	5.49%
Total votes		29,030	100.00%
Democratic hold			
Democratic hold			

=== District 11 ===
Primary Election Results
Party	Candidate	Votes	%
Democratic Party Primary Results
Democratic	Peter Goudinoff (incumbent)	5,459	37.38%
Democratic	John Kromko (incumbent)	5,310	36.35%
Democratic	Jorge Luis Garcia	3,837	26.27%
Total votes		14,606	100.00%
Republican Party Primary Results
Republican	Mike Price	2,541	57.92%
Republican	Ed Torrejon	1,846	42.08%
Total votes		4,387	100.00%

General Election Results
Party	Candidate	Votes	%
Democratic	John Kromko (incumbent)	19,168	35.08%
Democratic	Peter Goudinoff (incumbent)	18,811	34.43%
Republican	Mike Price	9,445	17.29%
Republican	Ed Torrejon	7,213	13.20%
Total votes		54,637	100.00%
Democratic hold			
Democratic hold			

=== District 12 ===
Primary Election Results
Party	Candidate	Votes	%
Democratic Party Primary Results
Democratic	Don L. Vance	5,376	38.20%
Democratic	Phyllis E. Fetter	4,596	32.66%
Democratic	John R. Harman	4,100	29.14%
Total votes		14,072	100.00%
Republican Party Primary Results
Republican	Jack B. Jewett (incumbent)	6,600	54.79%
Republican	Ruth E. Eskesen	5,447	45.21%
Total votes		12,047	100.00%
New Alliance Party Primary Results
New Alliance	Wynonia Brewington Burke	1	100.00%
Total votes		1	100.00%

General Election Results
Party	Candidate	Votes	%
Republican	Jack B. Jewett (incumbent)	27,172	31.57%
Republican	Ruth E. Eskesen	20,642	23.99%
Democratic	Phyllis E. Fetter	19,039	22.12%
Democratic	Don L. Vance	18,128	21.07%
New Alliance	Wynonia Brewington Burke	1,076	1.25%
Total votes		86,057	100.00%
Republican hold			
Republican gain from Democratic			

=== District 13 ===
Primary Election Results
Party	Candidate	Votes	%
Democratic Party Primary Results
Democratic	Eleanor D. Schorr	5,615	31.73%
Democratic	Andy Nichols	4,469	25.26%
Democratic	Evan Jay Adelstein	2,800	15.82%
Democratic	Tres English	2,511	14.19%
Democratic	Patricia R. Bacalis	1,464	8.27%
Democratic	Larry Linson	835	4.72%
Total votes		17,694	100.00%
Republican Party Primary Results
Republican	Patricia A. "Patti" Noland	5,440	31.54%
Republican	Anthony D. "Tony" Terry	5,120	29.68%
Republican	Helen Ruth Seader	3,956	22.94%
Republican	Boris Baird	2,732	15.84%
Total votes		17,248	100.00%

General Election Results
Party	Candidate	Votes	%
Democratic	Eleanor D. Schorr	22,729	26.91%
Republican	Patricia A. "Patti" Noland	21,127	25.02%
Democratic	Andy Nichols	20,916	24.77%
Republican	Anthony D. "Tony" Terry	19,681	23.30%
Total votes		84,453	100.00%
Democratic hold			
Republican hold			

=== District 14 ===
Primary Election Results
Party	Candidate	Votes	%
Democratic Party Primary Results
Democratic	Cindy Resnick (incumbent)	6,057	56.69%
Democratic	Ruth Solomon	4,628	43.31%
Total votes		10,685	100.00%
Republican Party Primary Results
Republican	Jim Green (incumbent)	6,326	45.44%
Republican	Richard Tobin Brubaker	3,862	27.74%
Republican	Edmund D. "Ed" Kahn	3,734	26.82%
Total votes		13,922	100.00%

General Election Results
Party	Candidate	Votes	%
Democratic	Cindy Resnick (incumbent)	22,543	31.38%
Democratic	Ruth Solomon	19,312	26.88%
Republican	Jim Green (incumbent)	18,132	25.24%
Republican	Richard Tobin Brubaker	11,855	16.50%
Total votes		71,842	100.00%
Democratic hold			
Democratic gain from Republican			

=== District 15 ===
Primary Election Results
Party	Candidate	Votes	%
Democratic Party Primary Results
Democratic	David A. Williams	4,777	54.98%
Democratic	Alan "Al" L. Bowlsby	3,912	45.02%
Total votes		8,689	100.00%
Republican Party Primary Results
Republican	Bob Williams	6,022	29.29%
Republican	Kyle W. Hindman	5,393	26.23%
Republican	Ned King	4,047	19.68%
Republican	Ray Stedron	3,036	14.76%
Republican	Arley McRae	2,065	10.04%
Total votes		20,563	100.00%

General Election Results
Party	Candidate	Votes	%
Republican	Bob Williams	24,205	33.70%
Republican	Kyle W. Hindman	24,057	33.49%
Democratic	David A. Williams	13,379	18.63%
Democratic	Alan "Al" L. Bowlsby	10,184	14.18%
Total votes		71,825	100.00%
Republican hold			
Republican hold			

=== District 16 ===
Primary Election Results
Party	Candidate	Votes	%
Democratic Party Primary Results
Democratic	Amelia "Nina" O'Brien	4,027	100.00%
Total votes		4,027	100.00%
Republican Party Primary Results
Republican	Karen Mills (incumbent)	5,271	32.74%
Republican	Dave McCarroll	3,879	24.09%
Republican	Bob Hungerford (incumbent)	3,557	22.09%
Republican	Martin Chichester	2,000	12.42%
Republican	Ted Carman	1,392	8.65%
Total votes		16,099	100.00%

General Election Results
Party	Candidate	Votes	%
Republican	Karen Mills (incumbent)	22,613	41.91%
Republican	Dave McCarroll	18,232	33.79%
Democratic	Amelia "Nina" O'Brien	13,113	24.30%
Total votes		53,958	100.00%
Republican hold			
Republican hold			

=== District 17 ===
Primary Election Results
Party	Candidate	Votes	%
Republican Party Primary Results
Republican	Brenda Burns (incumbent)	7,940	51.03%
Republican	Robert "Bob" Burns	7,618	48.97%
Total votes		15,558	100.00%
Libertarian Party Primary Results
Libertarian	Richard "Fred" Baehre Jr.	4	100.00%
Total votes		4	100.00%

General Election Results
Party	Candidate	Votes	%
Republican	Brenda Burns (incumbent)	25,550	51.68%
Republican	Robert "Bob" Burns	23,890	48.32%
Total votes		49,440	100.00%
Republican hold			
Republican hold			

=== District 18 ===
Primary Election Results
Party	Candidate	Votes	%
Democratic Party Primary Results
Democratic	Janet Valder	4,007	57.67%
Democratic	Joseph A. "Joe" Bacso	2,941	42.33%
Total votes		6,948	100.00%
Republican Party Primary Results
Republican	Jane Dee Hull (incumbent)	6,761	33.25%
Republican	Susan Gerard	6,402	31.49%
Republican	Trent Franks	3,936	19.36%
Republican	Fleeta Baldwin	2,271	11.17%
Republican	Dewey Casagrande	961	4.73%
Total votes		20,331	100.00%

General Election Results
Party	Candidate	Votes	%
Republican	Susan Gerard	21,742	33.97%
Republican	Jane Dee Hull (incumbent)	21,033	32.86%
Democratic	Janet Valder	12,425	19.41%
Democratic	Joseph A. "Joe" Bacso	8,805	13.76%
Total votes		64,005	100.00%
Republican hold			
Republican hold			

=== District 19 ===
Primary Election Results
Party	Candidate	Votes	%
Democratic Party Primary Results
Democratic	June M. Merrill	4,360	57.32%
Democratic	Cyril "Cy" Wadzita	3,247	42.68%
Total votes		7,607	100.00%
Republican Party Primary Results
Republican	Nancy Wessel (incumbent)	6,530	30.14%
Republican	Don Kenney	5,038	23.25%
Republican	Angelo Calderone	3,883	17.92%
Republican	Phil Corbell	3,144	14.51%
Republican	Ronald G. Tapp	3,070	14.17%
Total votes		21,665	100.00%

General Election Results
Party	Candidate	Votes	%
Republican	Nancy Wessel (incumbent)	32,619	35.88%
Republican	Don Kenney	28,624	31.48%
Democratic	June M. Merrill	15,872	17.46%
Democratic	Cyril "Cy" Wadzita	13,807	15.19%
Total votes		90,922	100.00%
Republican hold			
Republican hold			

=== District 20 ===
Primary Election Results
Party	Candidate	Votes	%
Democratic Party Primary Results
Democratic	Debbie McCune (incumbent)	4,382	53.19%
Democratic	Bobby Raymond (incumbent)	3,857	46.81%
Total votes		8,239	100.00%
Republican Party Primary Results
Republican	Georgia Hargan	4,370	100.00%
Total votes		4,370	100.00%

General Election Results
Party	Candidate	Votes	%
Democratic	Debbie McCune (incumbent)	16,668	39.41%
Democratic	Bobby Raymond (incumbent)	13,939	32.96%
Republican	Georgia Hargan	11,690	27.64%
Total votes		42,297	100.00%
Democratic hold			
Democratic hold			

=== District 21 ===
Primary Election Results
Party	Candidate	Votes	%
Democratic Party Primary Results
Democratic	Bob Guzley	4,532	94.87%
Democratic	B. A. Gost	245	5.13%
Total votes		4,777	100.00%
Republican Party Primary Results
Republican	Stan Barnes	6,965	27.95%
Republican	Leslie Whiting Johnson (incumbent)	6,740	27.05%
Republican	Marilyn Hawker	5,895	23.66%
Republican	Bob Broughton (incumbent)	5,318	21.34%
Total votes		24,918	100.00%

General Election Results
Party	Candidate	Votes	%
Republican	Stan Barnes	25,041	36.53%
Republican	Leslie Whiting Johnson (incumbent)	24,680	36.01%
Democratic	Bob Guzley	18,822	27.46%
Total votes		68,543	100.00%
Republican hold			
Republican hold			

=== District 22 ===
Primary Election Results
Party	Candidate	Votes	%
Democratic Party Primary Results
Democratic	Art Hamilton (incumbent)	3,140	52.62%
Democratic	Earl V. Wilcox (incumbent)	2,827	47.38%
Total votes		5,967	100.00%

General Election Results
Party	Candidate	Votes	%
Democratic	Art Hamilton (incumbent)	9,890	50.98%
Democratic	Earl V. Wilcox (incumbent)	9,509	49.02%
Total votes		19,399	100.00%
Democratic hold			
Democratic hold			

=== District 23 ===
Primary Election Results
Party	Candidate	Votes	%
Democratic Party Primary Results
Democratic	Armando Ruiz (incumbent)	3,179	37.61%
Democratic	Sandra Kennedy (incumbent)	3,030	35.85%
Democratic	Petra Falcon	2,243	26.54%
Total votes		8,452	100.00%
Republican Party Primary Results
Republican	Roland W. Campbell	703	37.73%
Republican	C. Edward Cornell	608	32.64%
Republican	Stephen Letson	552	29.63%
Total votes		1,863	100.00%
New Alliance Party Primary Results
New Alliance	Gregory L. Campbell	2	100.00%
Total votes		2	100.00%

General Election Results
Party	Candidate	Votes	%
Democratic	Sandra Kennedy (incumbent)	8,905	37.19%
Democratic	Armando Ruiz (incumbent)	8,097	33.81%
Republican	Roland W. Campbell	3,756	15.69%
Republican	C. Edward Cornell	2,641	11.03%
New Alliance	Gregory L. Campbell	547	2.28%
Total votes		23,946	100.00%
Democratic hold			
Democratic hold			

=== District 24 ===
Primary Election Results
Party	Candidate	Votes	%
Democratic Party Primary Results
Democratic	Paul Benjamin	4,335	100.00%
Total votes		4,335	100.00%
Republican Party Primary Results
Republican	Chris Herstam (incumbent)	8,174	36.96%
Republican	Candice Nagel	7,542	34.11%
Republican	Gary Giordano (incumbent)	6,398	28.93%
Total votes		22,114	100.00%
Libertarian Party Primary Results
Libertarian	Vaughn L. Treude	42	77.78%
Libertarian	Susan K. Putney	12	22.22%
Total votes		54	100.00%

General Election Results
Party	Candidate	Votes	%
Republican	Candice Nagel	35,198	39.78%
Republican	Chris Herstam (incumbent)	32,208	36.40%
Democratic	Laura Hine (Note: Laura Hine replaced Paul Benjamin as the Democratic nominee for the general election. A rationale for the replacement is not given in the official state canvass.)	15,029	16.99%
Libertarian	Susan K. Putney	3,415	3.86%
Libertarian	Vaughn L. Treude	2,633	2.98%
Total votes		88,483	100.00%
Republican hold			
Republican hold			

=== District 25 ===
Primary Election Results
Party	Candidate	Votes	%
Democratic Party Primary Results
Democratic	Sue Laybe	4,587	100.00%
Total votes		4,587	100.00%
Republican Party Primary Results
Republican	John King (incumbent)	4,152	28.91%
Republican	Margaret Updike	3,805	26.49%
Republican	Elizabeth Adams Rockwell (incumbent)	3,742	26.05%
Republican	Ron Vander Ark	2,665	18.55%
Total votes		14,364	100.00%

General Election Results
Party	Candidate	Votes	%
Democratic	Sue Laybe	15,514	34.06%
Republican	Margaret Updike	15,065	33.08%
Republican	John King (incumbent)	14,964	32.86%
Total votes		45,543	100.00%
Democratic gain from Republican			
Republican hold			

=== District 26 ===
Primary Election Results
Party	Candidate	Votes	%
Democratic Party Primary Results
Democratic	Mary Anne C. Lewis	4,208	100.00%
Total votes		4,208	100.00%
Republican Party Primary Results
Republican	Jim Meredith (incumbent)	6,357	38.36%
Republican	Jim Miller (incumbent)	5,843	35.26%
Republican	Ann Herzer	4,372	26.38%
Total votes		16,572	100.00%

General Election Results
Party	Candidate	Votes	%
Republican	Jim Meredith (incumbent)	20,750	37.82%
Republican	Jim Miller (incumbent)	20,237	36.88%
Democratic	Mary Anne C. Lewis	13,880	25.30%
Total votes		54,867	100.00%
Republican hold			
Republican hold			

=== District 27 ===
Primary Election Results
Party	Candidate	Votes	%
Democratic Party Primary Results
Democratic	Jim Cunningham	3,511	51.12%
Democratic	Jalma Hunsinger	3,357	48.88%
Total votes		6,868	100.00%
Republican Party Primary Results
Republican	Bev Hermon (incumbent)	6,404	34.69%
Republican	Jenny Norton (incumbent)	6,192	33.54%
Republican	Gary Richardson	5,863	31.76%
Total votes		18,459	100.00%

General Election Results
Party	Candidate	Votes	%
Republican	Jenny Norton (incumbent)	25,897	33.02%
Republican	Bev Hermon (incumbent)	25,570	32.60%
Democratic	Jalma Hunsinger	14,899	18.99%
Democratic	Jim Cunningham	12,074	15.39%
Total votes		78,440	100.00%
Republican hold			
Republican hold			

=== District 28 ===
Primary Election Results
Party	Candidate	Votes	%
Democratic Party Primary Results
Democratic	Susan Kayler	4,290	100.00%
Total votes		4,290	100.00%
Republican Party Primary Results
Republican	Jim Skelly (incumbent)	8,708	31.35%
Republican	Heinz R. Hink (incumbent)	7,597	27.35%
Republican	David S. Schweikert	6,186	22.27%
Republican	John H. Weisneck	5,290	19.04%
Total votes		27,781	100.00%

General Election Results
Party	Candidate	Votes	%
Republican	Jim Skelly (incumbent)	37,583	39.21%
Republican	Heinz R. Hink (incumbent)	33,691	35.15%
Democratic	Susan Kayler	24,568	25.63%
Total votes		95,842	100.00%
Republican hold			
Republican hold			

=== District 29 ===
Primary Election Results
Party	Candidate	Votes	%
Republican Party Primary Results
Republican	Lela Steffey (incumbent)	7,500	40.40%
Republican	John T. Wrzesinski	6,656	35.85%
Republican	Don Strauch (incumbent)	4,408	23.74%
Total votes		18,564	100.00%

General Election Results
Party	Candidate	Votes	%
Republican	Lela Steffey (incumbent)	20,538	54.09%
Republican	John T. Wrzesinski	17,429	45.91%
Total votes		37,967	100.00%
Republican hold			
Republican hold			

=== District 30 ===
Primary Election Results
Party	Candidate	Votes	%
Republican Party Primary Results
Republican	Mark W. Killian (incumbent)	9,660	32.20%
Republican	William "Bill" Mundell (incumbent)	7,821	26.07%
Republican	Dean Riggs Ellsworth	7,496	24.99%
Republican	Gregory J.S. Roberds	5,022	16.74%
Total votes		29,999	100.00%
Libertarian Party Primary Results
Libertarian	Robert D. Moore	35	100.00%
Total votes		35	100.00%

General Election Results
Party	Candidate	Votes	%
Republican	Mark W. Killian (incumbent)	43,478	46.61%
Republican	William "Bill" Mundell (incumbent)	39,909	42.78%
Libertarian	Robert D. Moore	9,896	10.61%
Total votes		93,283	100.00%
Republican hold			
Republican hold			

== Effect of the Impeachment of Governor Evan Mecham ==
On February 8, 1988, the Arizona House of Representatives voted to impeach Governor Evan Mecham. This caused a schism in the Arizona Republican Party since the House was controlled by Republicans and the Governor was also a Republican.

The table below summarizes the impeachment votes of each member on Feb. 8, 1988 and their subsequent fate in the 1988 elections.

District	Representative	Party	Impeachment Vote	Political Outcome
1st	Don Aldridge	Rep	Nay	Re-elected
1st	Dave Carson	Rep	Nay	Re-elected
2nd	John Wettaw	Rep	Aye	Re-elected
2nd	Karan English	Dem	Aye	Re-elected
3rd	Benjamin Hanley	Dem	Aye	Re-elected
3rd	Jack C. Jackson	Dem	Aye	Re-elected
4th	E. C. "Polly" Rosenbaum	Dem	Nay	Re-elected
4th	Jack A. Brown	Dem	Nay	Re-elected
5th	Robert J. "Bob" McLendon	Dem	Aye	Re-elected
5th	Herb Guenther	Dem	Nay	Re-elected
6th	Jim Hartdegen	Rep	Aye	Re-elected
6th	Henry Evans	Dem	Aye	Re-elected
7th	Richard "Dick" Pacheco	Dem	Aye	Re-elected
7th	Roy Hudson	Dem	Aye	Retired
8th	Joe Lane	Rep	Aye	Lost (Primary)
8th	Gus Arzberger	Dem	Aye	Retired
9th	Bill English	Rep	Nay	Re-elected
9th	Bart Baker	Rep	Aye	Re-elected
10th	Carmen Cajero	Dem	Aye	Re-elected
10th	Phillip Hubbard	Dem	Aye	Re-elected
11th	Peter Goudinoff	Dem	Aye	Re-elected
11th	John Kromko	Dem	Aye	Re-elected
12th	Jack Jewett	Rep	Aye	Re-elected
12th	Reid Ewing	Dem	Aye	Retired
13th	Larry Hawke	Rep	Aye	Retired
13th	David C. Bartlett	Dem	Aye	Retired
14th	Jim Green	Rep	Aye	Lost (General)
14th	Cindy Resnick	Dem	Aye	Re-elected
15th	James B. Ratliff	Rep	Nay	Retired
15th	Bob Denny	Rep	Nay	Retired
16th	Bob Hungerford	Rep	Aye	Lost (Primary)
16th	Karen Mills	Rep	Nay	Re-elected
17th	Sterling Ridge	Rep	Aye	Retired
17th	Brenda Burns	Rep	Nay	Re-elected
18th	Jane Dee Hull	Rep	Aye	Re-elected
18th	George Weisz	Rep	Aye	Retired
19th	Nancy Wessel	Rep	Aye	Re-elected
19th	Jim White	Rep	Aye	Retired
20th	Debbie McCune	Dem	Aye	Re-elected
20th	Bobby Raymond	Dem	Aye	Re-elected
21st	Leslie Whiting Johnson	Rep	Nay	Re-elected
21st	Bob Broughton	Rep	Aye	Lost (Primary)
22nd	Art Hamilton	Dem	Aye	Re-elected
22nd	Earl V. Wilcox	Dem	Aye	Re-elected
23rd	Armando Ruiz	Dem	Aye	Re-elected
23rd	Sandra Kennedy	Dem	Aye	Re-elected
24th	Chris Herstam	Rep	Aye	Re-elected
24th	Gary Giordano	Rep	Nay	Lost (Primary)
25th	Elizabeth Adams Rockwell	Rep	Aye	Lost (Primary)
25th	John King	Rep	Aye	Lost (General)
26th	Jim Meredith	Rep	Aye	Re-elected
26th	Jim Miller	Rep	Aye	Re-elected
27th	Bev Hermon	Rep	Aye	Re-elected
27th	Jenny Norton	Rep	Aye	Re-elected
28th	Jim Skelly	Rep	Aye	Re-elected
28th	Heinz R. Hink	Rep	Aye	Re-elected
29th	Lela Steffey	Rep	Nay	Re-elected
29th	Don Strauch	Rep	Aye	Lost (Primary)
30th	Mark W. Killian	Rep	Nay	Re-elected
30th	William "Bill" Mundell	Rep	Aye	Re-elected
