= 1978 Arizona House of Representatives election =

1978 Arizona House of Representatives elections
- November 7, 1978

All 60 seats in the Arizona House 31 seats needed for a majority
	Majority party	Minority party
Leader	Frank Kelley	Larry Bahill
Party	Republican	Democratic
Leader's seat	26th	10th
Last election	38	22
Seats after	42	18
Seat change	▲4	▼4
Speaker before election
Frank Kelley
Republican
Elected Speaker
Frank Kelley
Republican

The 1978 Arizona House of Representatives elections were held on November 7, 1978. Voters elected all 60 members of the Arizona House of Representatives in multi-member districts to serve a two-year term. The elections coincided with the elections for other offices, including Governor, U.S. House, and State Senate. Primary elections were held on September 12, 1978.

Prior to the elections, the Republicans held a majority of 38 seats over the Democrats' 22 seats.

Following the elections, Republicans maintained control of the chamber and expanded their majority to 42 Republicans to 18 Democrats, a net gain of four seats for Republicans.

The newly elected members served in the 34th Arizona State Legislature, during which Republican Frank Kelley was re-elected as Speaker of the Arizona House. (Note: Kelley was re-elected as Speaker for the 34th legislature, defeating Democratic Leader Representative Larry Bahill, who was also nominated for Speaker. The vote tally for Speaker was: Kelley-41 votes to Bahill-18 votes, with Representative Kelley not voting.)

== Summary of Results by Arizona State Legislative District ==
District	Incumbent	Party	Elected Representative	Outcome
1st	John U. Hays	Rep	John U. Hays	Rep Hold
1st	James A. (Jim) Woodward	Rep	Jerry Everall	Rep Hold
2nd	Sam A. McConnell Jr.	Rep	Sam A. McConnell Jr.	Rep Hold
2nd	John Wettaw	Rep	John Wettaw	Rep Hold
3rd	Benjamin Hanley	Dem	Benjamin Hanley	Dem Hold
3rd	Daniel Peaches	Rep	Daniel Peaches	Rep Hold
4th	E. C. "Polly" Rosenbaum	Dem	E. C. "Polly" Rosenbaum	Dem Hold
4th	Edward G. (Bunch) Guerrero	Dem	Edward G. (Bunch) Guerrero	Dem Hold
5th	Elwood W. Bradford	Dem	Frank McElhaney	Dem Hold
5th	D. J. "Jim" Phillips	Dem	Morris "Court" Courtright	Rep Gain
6th	Jim Hartdegen	Rep	Jim Hartdegen	Rep Hold
6th	Manuel (Manny) Marin	Dem	Renz D. Jennings	Dem Hold
7th	Richard "Dick" Pacheco	Dem	Richard "Dick" Pacheco	Dem Hold
7th	Pete Villaverde	Dem	Marjory "Marge" Ollson	Dem Hold
8th	Steve J. Vukcevich	Dem	Steve J. Vukcevich	Dem Hold
8th	James A. "Jim" Elliott	Dem	Joe Lane	Rep Gain
9th	Bill (William J.) English	Rep	Bill (William J.) English	Rep Hold
9th	"Mr. John" R. Humphreys Sr.	Dem	Bart Baker	Rep Gain
10th	Larry Bahill	Dem	Larry Bahill	Dem Hold
10th	Carmen F. Cajero	Dem	Carmen F. Cajero	Dem Hold
11th	Peter Goudinoff	Dem	Peter Goudinoff	Dem Hold
11th	Emilio Carrillo	Dem	Mike Morales	Rep Gain
12th	Thomas N. "Tom" Goodwin	Rep	Thomas N. "Tom" Goodwin	Rep Hold
12th	John Kromko	Dem	John Kromko	Dem Hold
13th	Sister Clare Dunn	Dem	Sister Clare Dunn	Dem Hold
13th	Larry Hawke	Rep	Larry Hawke	Rep Hold
14th	Arnold Jeffers	Rep	Arnold Jeffers	Rep Hold
14th	Emmett McLoughlin	Rep	Ralph Soelter	Rep Hold
15th	James B. Ratliff	Rep	James B. Ratliff	Rep Hold
15th	J. Herbert Everett	Rep	Bob Denny	Rep Hold
16th	Diane B. McCarthy	Rep	Diane B. McCarthy	Rep Hold
16th	Don Stewart	Rep	Bob Hungerford	Rep Hold
17th	C. W. "Bill" Lewis	Rep	C. W. "Bill" Lewis	Rep Hold
17th	Patricia "Pat" Wright	Rep	Patricia "Pat" Wright	Rep Hold
18th	Burton S. Barr	Rep	Burton S. Barr	Rep Hold
18th	Pete Dunn	Rep	Pete Dunn	Rep Hold
19th	Tony West	Rep	Tony West	Rep Hold
19th	Stan Akers	Rep	Jane Dee Hull	Rep Hold
20th	Lillian Jordan	Rep	Lillian Jordan	Rep Hold
20th	Gerald F. (Jerry) Moore	Dem	Debbie McCune	Dem Hold
21st	Elizabeth Adams Rockwell	Rep	Elizabeth Adams Rockwell	Rep Hold
21st	Donald Kenney (Note: Republican Keith W. Hubbard of District 21 resigned effective at 5:00 p.m., Tuesday, April 19, 1977. He was replaced by Donald Kenney on April 25, 1977, to fill the unexpired portion of Mr. Hubbard's term.)	Rep	Donald Kenney	Rep Hold
22nd	Art Hamilton	Dem	Art Hamilton	Dem Hold
22nd	Earl V. Wilcox	Dem	Earl V. Wilcox	Dem Hold
23rd	Leon Thompson	Dem	Leon Thompson	Dem Hold
23rd	Tony R. Abril Sr.	Dem	Tony R. Abril Sr.	Dem Hold
24th	Pete Corpstein	Rep	Pete Corpstein	Rep Hold
24th	Cal Holman	Rep	Cal Holman	Rep Hold
25th	D. Lee Jones	Rep	D. Lee Jones	Rep Hold
25th	Jacque Steiner	Rep	Jacque Steiner	Rep Hold
26th	Frank Kelley	Rep	Frank Kelley	Rep Hold
26th	Peter Kay	Rep	Peter Kay	Rep Hold
27th	Juanita Harelson	Rep	Juanita Harelson	Rep Hold
27th	Dick Flynn	Rep	Doug Todd	Rep Hold
28th	Jim Skelly	Rep	Jim Skelly	Rep Hold
28th	William E. "Bill" Rigel	Rep	David B. Kret (Note: Republican David B. Kret died in office on May 10, 1979. Paul R. Messinger was elected to fill the vacancy in the 28th District on September 11, 1979 in a special election. Mr. Messinger defeated Democratic Scottsdale Mayor Bill Jenkins in the September special election, which was only the second time a special election was conducted to fill a vacancy instead of an appointment from the appropriate board of county supervisors. Mr. Messinger was administered the Oath of Office on October 17, 1979 and was seated as a Member of the Arizona House of Representatives, Thirty-Fourth Legislature on November 12, 1979.)	Rep Hold
29th	Jim Cooper	Rep	Jim Cooper	Rep Hold
29th	Donna J. Carlson	Rep	Donna J. Carlson	Rep Hold
30th	James J. Sossaman	Rep	James J. Sossaman	Rep Hold
30th	Carl J. Kunasek	Rep	Carl J. Kunasek	Rep Hold

== Detailed Results ==
=== District 1 ===
Primary Election Results
Party	Candidate	Votes	%
Democratic Party Primary Results
Democratic	Jerri Wagner	4,885	44.29%
Democratic	D. R. (Don) Gump	3,168	28.72%
Democratic	John E. (Scotty) Senac	2,976	26.98%
Total votes		11,029	100.00%
Republican Party Primary Results
Republican	John U. Hays (incumbent)	6,113	43.88%
Republican	Jerry Everall	4,181	30.01%
Republican	James A. (Jim) Woodward (incumbent)	3,638	26.11%
Total votes		13,932	100.00%

General Election Results
Party	Candidate	Votes	%
Republican	John U. Hays (incumbent)	16,928	32.99%
Republican	Jerry Everall	13,673	26.64%
Democratic	Jerri Wagner	9,538	18.59%
Democratic	D.R. (Don) Gump	7,594	14.80%
Independent	William "Bill" Pynchon	3,583	6.98%
Total votes		51,316	100.00%
Republican hold			
Republican hold			

=== District 2 ===
Primary Election Results
Party	Candidate	Votes	%
Democratic Party Primary Results
Democratic	Annice Husband	4,294	64.49%
Democratic	Joe E. Lingerfelt	2,364	35.51%
Total votes		6,658	100.00%
Republican Party Primary Results
Republican	John Wettaw (incumbent)	2,375	52.26%
Republican	Sam A. McConnell Jr. (incumbent)	2,170	47.74%
Total votes		4,545	100.00%

General Election Results
Party	Candidate	Votes	%
Republican	John Wettaw (incumbent)	9,275	31.25%
Republican	Sam A. McConnell Jr. (incumbent)	7,698	25.93%
Democratic	Annice Husband	7,603	25.61%
Democratic	Joe E. Lingerfelt	5,106	17.20%
Total votes		29,682	100.00%
Republican hold			
Republican hold			

=== District 3 ===
Primary Election Results
Party	Candidate	Votes	%
Democratic Party Primary Results
Democratic	Benjamin Hanley (incumbent)	4,563	100.00%
Total votes		4,563	100.00%
Republican Party Primary Results
Republican	Daniel Peaches (incumbent)	1,501	100.00%
Total votes		1,501	100.00%

General Election Results
Party	Candidate	Votes	%
Democratic	Benjamin Hanley (incumbent)	9,194	54.97%
Republican	Daniel Peaches (incumbent)	7,533	45.03%
Total votes		16,727	100.00%
Democratic hold			
Republican hold			

=== District 4 ===
Primary Election Results
Party	Candidate	Votes	%
Democratic Party Primary Results
Democratic	E. C. "Polly" Rosenbaum (incumbent)	5,806	37.31%
Democratic	Edward G. (Bunch) Guerrero (incumbent)	5,800	37.27%
Democratic	James H. Dawdy	3,956	25.42%
Total votes		15,562	100.00%
Republican Party Primary Results
Republican	Dorothy L. Schatz	2,170	50.54%
Republican	Frances Geissler	2,124	49.46%
Total votes		4,294	100.00%

General Election Results
Party	Candidate	Votes	%
Democratic	E.C. "Polly" Rosenbaum (incumbent)	10,681	30.63%
Democratic	Edward G. (Bunch) Guerrero (incumbent)	9,502	27.25%
Republican	Dorothy L. Schatz	7,909	22.68%
Republican	Frances Geissler	6,781	19.44%
Total votes		34,873	100.00%
Democratic hold			
Democratic hold			

=== District 5 ===
Primary Election Results
Party	Candidate	Votes	%
Democratic Party Primary Results
Democratic	Frank McElhaney	1,886	19.77%
Democratic	Bob (Red) Phillips	1,846	19.35%
Democratic	Carol Kehl Engler	1,736	18.20%
Democratic	Elwood W. Bradford (incumbent)	1,479	15.51%
Democratic	John A. Nussbaumer	1,460	15.31%
Democratic	Wilburn McCurley	711	7.45%
Democratic	J. C. Walker	420	4.40%
Total votes		9,538	100.00%
Republican Party Primary Results
Republican	Morris "Court" Courtright	1,653	100.00%
Total votes		1,653	100.00%

General Election Results
Party	Candidate	Votes	%
Democratic	Frank McElhaney	6,821	36.67%
Republican	Morris "Court" Courtright	5,997	32.24%
Democratic	Bob (Red) Phillips	5,782	31.09%
Total votes		18,600	100.00%
Democratic hold			
Republican gain from Democratic			

=== District 6 ===
Primary Election Results
Party	Candidate	Votes	%
Democratic Party Primary Results
Democratic	Manuel (Manny) Marin (incumbent)	3,155	38.75%
Democratic	Renz D. Jennings	2,699	33.15%
Democratic	G. T. (Tom) Alley	2,287	28.09%
Total votes		8,141	100.00%
Republican Party Primary Results
Republican	Jim Hartdegen (incumbent)	1,517	100.00%
Total votes		1,517	100.00%

General Election Results
Party	Candidate	Votes	%
Republican	Jim Hartdegen (incumbent)	5,717	30.97%
Democratic	Renz D. Jennings	5,460	29.58%
Democratic	Manuel (Manny) Marin (incumbent)	5,400	29.25%
Independent	James Alverson	1,884	10.21%
Total votes		18,461	100.00%
Republican hold			
Democratic hold			

=== District 7 ===
Primary Election Results
Party	Candidate	Votes	%
Democratic Party Primary Results
Democratic	Richard "Dick" Pacheco (incumbent)	4,977	43.06%
Democratic	Marjory "Marge" Ollson	3,515	30.41%
Democratic	Peter VillaVerde (incumbent)	3,066	26.53%
Total votes		11,558	100.00%
Republican Party Primary Results
Republican	Lloyd R. Logan Jr.	1,070	55.18%
Republican	Richard Frederick Koppe Jr.	869	44.82%
Total votes		1,939	100.00%

General Election Results
Party	Candidate	Votes	%
Democratic	Richard "Dick" Pacheco (incumbent)	7,822	34.21%
Democratic	Marjory "Marge" Ollson	6,173	27.00%
Republican	Lloyd R. Logan Jr.	4,684	20.49%
Republican	Richard Frederick Koppe Jr.	4,185	18.30%
Total votes		22,864	100.00%
Democratic hold			
Democratic hold			

=== District 8 ===
Primary Election Results
Party	Candidate	Votes	%
Democratic Party Primary Results
Democratic	Steve J. Vukcevich (incumbent)	5,943	36.90%
Democratic	James A. "Jim" Elliott (incumbent)	5,735	35.61%
Democratic	Mike Bibb	4,427	27.49%
Total votes		16,105	100.00%
Republican Party Primary Results
Republican	Joe Lane	2,121	100.00%
Total votes		2,121	100.00%

General Election Results
Party	Candidate	Votes	%
Republican	Joe Lane	9,941	37.87%
Democratic	Steve J. Vukcevich (incumbent)	8,492	32.35%
Democratic	James A. "Jim" Elliott (incumbent)	7,818	29.78%
Total votes		26,251	100.00%
Republican gain from Democratic			
Democratic hold			

=== District 9 ===
Primary Election Results
Party	Candidate	Votes	%
Democratic Party Primary Results
Democratic	Gordon A. Burgess	2,567	39.03%
Democratic	David "Lucky" Lindsay	2,019	30.70%
Democratic	"Mr. John" R. Humphreys, Sr. (incumbent)	1,991	30.27%
Total votes		6,577	100.00%
Republican Party Primary Results
Republican	Bill (William J.) English (incumbent)	2,486	53.91%
Republican	Bart Baker	2,125	46.09%
Total votes		4,611	100.00%

General Election Results
Party	Candidate	Votes	%
Republican	Bill (William J.) English (incumbent)	8,970	29.24%
Republican	Bart Baker	7,935	25.86%
Democratic	Gordon A. Burgess	7,427	24.21%
Democratic	David "Lucky" Lindsay	6,348	20.69%
Total votes		30,680	100.00%
Republican hold			
Republican gain from Democratic			

=== District 10 ===
Primary Election Results
Party	Candidate	Votes	%
Democratic Party Primary Results
Democratic	Carmen F. Cajero (incumbent)	2,232	38.17%
Democratic	Larry Bahill (incumbent)	2,145	36.68%
Democratic	Hector S. McKenna	1,471	25.15%
Total votes		5,848	100.00%
Libertarian Party Primary Results
Libertarian	Jerry Crouch	7	58.33%
Libertarian	Robert J. Baumann (Note: Withdrew from the election on 8/22/78.)	5	41.67%
Total votes		12	100.00%

General Election Results
Party	Candidate	Votes	%
Democratic	Larry Bahill (incumbent)	6,061	46.33%
Democratic	Carmen F. Cajero (incumbent)	5,712	43.67%
Libertarian	Jerry Crouch	711	5.44%
Libertarian	Buck Crouch	597	4.56%
Total votes		13,081	100.00%
Democratic hold			
Democratic hold			

=== District 11 ===
Primary Election Results
Party	Candidate	Votes	%
Democratic Party Primary Results
Democratic	Peter Goudinoff (incumbent)	2,523	36.78%
Democratic	Emilio Carrillo (incumbent)	2,271	33.11%
Democratic	Ernie Soto Navarro	1,075	15.67%
Democratic	Pete Trombetta	990	14.43%
Total votes		6,859	100.00%
Republican Party Primary Results
Republican	Mike Morales	1,070	100.00%
Total votes		1,070	100.00%

General Election Results
Party	Candidate	Votes	%
Democratic	Peter Goudinoff (incumbent)	6,528	35.44%
Republican	Mike Morales	6,056	32.88%
Democratic	Emilio Carrillo (incumbent)	5,834	31.68%
Total votes		18,418	100.00%
Democratic hold			
Republican gain from Democratic			

=== District 12 ===
Primary Election Results
Party	Candidate	Votes	%
Democratic Party Primary Results
Democratic	John Kromko (incumbent)	3,496	58.05%
Democratic	Joe Skinner	2,526	41.95%
Total votes		6,022	100.00%
Republican Party Primary Results
Republican	Thomas N. "Tom" Goodwin (incumbent)	2,949	58.91%
Republican	Claudell Bailey	2,057	41.09%
Total votes		5,006	100.00%
Libertarian Party Primary Results
Libertarian	Robert Stockbridge	10	100.00%
Total votes		10	100.00%

General Election Results
Party	Candidate	Votes	%
Republican	Thomas N. "Tom" Goodwin (incumbent)	12,482	31.73%
Democratic	John Kromko (incumbent)	10,410	26.46%
Republican	Claudell Bailey	8,869	22.54%
Democratic	Joe Skinner	6,605	16.79%
Libertarian	Robert Stockbridge	976	2.48%
Total votes		39,342	100.00%
Republican hold			
Democratic hold			

=== District 13 ===
Primary Election Results
Party	Candidate	Votes	%
Democratic Party Primary Results
Democratic	Sister Clare Dunn (incumbent)	3,352	54.93%
Democratic	Bruce Wheeler	2,750	45.07%
Total votes		6,102	100.00%
Republican Party Primary Results
Republican	Larry Hawke (incumbent)	2,849	60.05%
Republican	S. H. "Mr. Seth" Linthicum	1,895	39.95%
Total votes		4,744	100.00%
Libertarian Party Primary Results
Libertarian	William "Bill" Stefanov	16	57.14%
Libertarian	Rita Olschewski	12	42.86%
Total votes		28	100.00%

General Election Results
Party	Candidate	Votes	%
Democratic	Sister Clare Dunn (incumbent)	10,448	28.13%
Republican	Larry Hawke (incumbent)	9,775	26.31%
Democratic	Bruce Wheeler	9,101	24.50%
Republican	S.H. "Mr. Seth" Linthicum	6,812	18.34%
Libertarian	Rita Olschewski	602	1.62%
Libertarian	William "Bill" Stefanov	410	1.10%
Total votes		37,148	100.00%
Democratic hold			
Republican hold			

=== District 14 ===
Primary Election Results
Party	Candidate	Votes	%
Democratic Party Primary Results
Democratic	Matt Welch	3,166	57.81%
Democratic	Peter Stoss	2,311	42.19%
Total votes		5,477	100.00%
Republican Party Primary Results
Republican	Arnold Jeffers (incumbent)	3,245	38.29%
Republican	Ralph Soelter	2,039	24.06%
Republican	James P. "Jim" Walker	1,615	19.06%
Republican	Bill Preble	1,575	18.59%
Total votes		8,474	100.00%

General Election Results
Party	Candidate	Votes	%
Republican	Arnold Jeffers (incumbent)	15,808	36.66%
Republican	Ralph Soelter	12,081	28.02%
Democratic	Matt Welch	9,223	21.39%
Democratic	Peter Stoss	6,009	13.94%
Total votes		43,121	100.00%
Republican hold			
Republican hold			

=== District 15 ===
Primary Election Results
Party	Candidate	Votes	%
Republican Party Primary Results
Republican	James B. Ratliff (incumbent)	4,527	44.67%
Republican	Bob Denny	3,765	37.15%
Republican	Doug Morris	1,843	18.18%
Total votes		10,135	100.00%
Libertarian Party Primary Results
Libertarian	David L. McNeill	4	100.00%
Total votes		4	100.00%

General Election Results
Party	Candidate	Votes	%
Republican	Bob Denny	12,658	45.69%
Republican	James B. Ratliff (incumbent)	12,284	44.34%
Libertarian	David L. McNeill	2,760	9.96%
Total votes		27,702	100.00%
Republican hold			
Republican hold			

=== District 16 ===
Primary Election Results
Party	Candidate	Votes	%
Democratic Party Primary Results
Democratic	Jim Kieffer	3,661	60.44%
Democratic	Steve Poe	2,396	39.56%
Total votes		6,057	100.00%
Republican Party Primary Results
Republican	Bob Hungerford	4,030	41.67%
Republican	Diane B. McCarthy (incumbent)	3,389	35.04%
Republican	Jim Mahar	1,195	12.36%
Republican	George Gundrum Jr.	1,057	10.93%
Total votes		9,671	100.00%
Libertarian Party Primary Results
Libertarian	Patricia A. Van	16	51.61%
Libertarian	John Kannarr	15	48.39%
Total votes		31	100.00%

General Election Results
Party	Candidate	Votes	%
Republican	Bob Hungerford	13,338	29.27%
Republican	Diane B. McCarthy (incumbent)	12,438	27.30%
Democratic	Jim Kieffer	10,410	22.85%
Democratic	Steve Poe	6,756	14.83%
Libertarian	Patricia A. Van	1,252	2.75%
Libertarian	John Kannarr	685	1.50%
Independent	Mark Vollmar	683	1.50%
Total votes		45,562	100.00%
Republican hold			
Republican hold			

=== District 17 ===
Primary Election Results
Party	Candidate	Votes	%
Democratic Party Primary Results
Democratic	Wilbert J. "Chili" Davis	2,863	100.00%
Total votes		2,863	100.00%
Republican Party Primary Results
Republican	Patricia "Pat" Wright (incumbent)	5,725	40.67%
Republican	C. W. "Bill" Lewis (incumbent)	3,676	26.12%
Republican	Gerry Daly	2,342	16.64%
Republican	Betty van Fredenberg	2,333	16.57%
Total votes		14,076	100.00%

General Election Results
Party	Candidate	Votes	%
Republican	Patricia "Pat" Wright (incumbent)	17,666	44.44%
Republican	C.W. "Bill" Lewis (incumbent)	15,724	39.55%
Democratic	Wilbert J. "Chili" Davis	6,365	16.01%
Total votes		39,755	100.00%
Republican hold			
Republican hold			

=== District 18 ===
Primary Election Results
Party	Candidate	Votes	%
Democratic Party Primary Results
Democratic	Jerome "Jerry" Denomme	2,445	100.00%
Total votes		2,445	100.00%
Republican Party Primary Results
Republican	Burton S. Barr (incumbent)	4,104	52.55%
Republican	Pete Dunn (incumbent)	3,705	47.45%
Total votes		7,809	100.00%
Libertarian Party Primary Results
Libertarian	Fred R. Esser	11	50.00%
Libertarian	Joe M. O'Connell	11	50.00%
Total votes		22	100.00%

General Election Results
Party	Candidate	Votes	%
Republican	Burton S. Barr (incumbent)	11,318	38.20%
Republican	Pete Dunn (incumbent)	10,473	35.34%
Democratic	Jerome "Jerry" Denomme	5,192	17.52%
Libertarian	Joe M. O'Connell	1,392	4.70%
Libertarian	Fred R. Esser	1,257	4.24%
Total votes		29,632	100.00%
Republican hold			
Republican hold			

=== District 19 ===
Primary Election Results
Party	Candidate	Votes	%
Democratic Party Primary Results
Democratic	William F. (Bill) Perkins	2,232	56.15%
Democratic	Alan L. Flory	1,743	43.85%
Total votes		3,975	100.00%
Republican Party Primary Results
Republican	Tony West (incumbent)	3,370	39.19%
Republican	Jane Dee Hull	3,184	37.02%
Republican	Linda B. Rosenthal	2,046	23.79%
Total votes		8,600	100.00%
Libertarian Party Primary Results
Libertarian	Michael A. Vogt	4	100.00%
Total votes		4	100.00%

General Election Results
Party	Candidate	Votes	%
Republican	Tony West (incumbent)	10,667	35.81%
Republican	Jane Dee Hull	9,955	33.42%
Democratic	William F. (Bill) Perkins	4,645	15.59%
Democratic	Alan L. Flory	3,632	12.19%
Libertarian	Michael A. Vogt	889	2.98%
Total votes		29,788	100.00%
Republican hold			
Republican hold			

=== District 20 ===
Primary Election Results
Party	Candidate	Votes	%
Democratic Party Primary Results
Democratic	Debbie McCune	2,066	34.75%
Democratic	Sue Tucker	1,837	30.90%
Democratic	Roland James	1,355	22.79%
Democratic	"Ed" Broad	687	11.56%
Total votes		5,945	100.00%
Republican Party Primary Results
Republican	Lillian Jordan (incumbent)	2,253	42.15%
Republican	Leona R. Miller	2,253	42.15%
Republican	Kent Ison	839	15.70%
Total votes		5,345	100.00%

General Election Results
Party	Candidate	Votes	%
Democratic	Debbie McCune	7,350	30.11%
Republican	Lillian Jordan (incumbent)	7,064	28.94%
Democratic	Sue Tucker	5,769	23.63%
Republican	Leona R. Miller	4,230	17.33%
Total votes		24,413	100.00%
Democratic hold			
Republican hold			

=== District 21 ===
Primary Election Results
Party	Candidate	Votes	%
Democratic Party Primary Results
Democratic	Jennie Cox	1,914	40.15%
Democratic	Robert "R. T." Griffin	1,809	37.95%
Democratic	Richard A. Lagesse	1,044	21.90%
Total votes		4,767	100.00%
Republican Party Primary Results
Republican	Elizabeth Adams Rockwell (incumbent)	2,552	43.91%
Republican	Donald Kenney (incumbent)	1,957	33.67%
Republican	W. Jack Kelly	1,303	22.42%
Total votes		5,812	100.00%
Libertarian Party Primary Results
Libertarian	A.B. Culp	10	50.00%
Libertarian	Robert M. Dugger	10	50.00%
Total votes		20	100.00%

General Election Results
Party	Candidate	Votes	%
Republican	Elizabeth Adams Rockwell (incumbent)	7,089	28.63%
Republican	Donald Kenney (incumbent)	6,765	27.33%
Democratic	Jennie Cox	5,138	20.75%
Democratic	Robert "R.T." Griffin	4,715	19.05%
Libertarian	Robert M. Dugger	528	2.13%
Libertarian	A.B. Culp	522	2.11%
Total votes		24,757	100.00%
Republican hold			
Republican hold			

=== District 22 ===
Primary Election Results
Party	Candidate	Votes	%
Democratic Party Primary Results
Democratic	Art Hamilton (incumbent)	2,367	52.62%
Democratic	Earl V. Wilcox (incumbent)	2,131	47.38%
Total votes		4,498	100.00%
Libertarian Party Primary Results
Libertarian	Raymond J. Stengel	7	100.00%
Total votes		7	100.00%

General Election Results
Party	Candidate	Votes	%
Democratic	Art Hamilton (incumbent)	4,873	45.04%
Democratic	Earl V. Wilcox (incumbent)	4,764	44.03%
Libertarian	Raymond J. Stengel	1,183	10.93%
Total votes		10,820	100.00%
Democratic hold			
Democratic hold			

=== District 23 ===
Primary Election Results
Party	Candidate	Votes	%
Democratic Party Primary Results
Democratic	Leon Thompson (incumbent)	1,629	36.39%
Democratic	Tony Abril, Sr. (incumbent)	1,417	31.66%
Democratic	Horace E. Owens	681	15.21%
Democratic	J.D. Holmes	469	10.48%
Democratic	Albert (Johnny Boy) Marshall	280	6.26%
Total votes		4,476	100.00%
Libertarian Party Primary Results
Libertarian	Tyler Olson	1	100.00%
Total votes		1	100.00%

General Election Results
Party	Candidate	Votes	%
Democratic	Leon Thompson (incumbent)	3,668	48.17%
Democratic	Tony R. Abril, Sr. (incumbent)	3,331	43.74%
Libertarian	Tyler Olson	616	8.09%
Total votes		7,615	100.00%
Democratic hold			
Democratic hold			

=== District 24 ===
Primary Election Results
Party	Candidate	Votes	%
Democratic Party Primary Results
Democratic	David A. Gorman	3,288	51.06%
Democratic	Gene Bullock	3,151	48.94%
Total votes		6,439	100.00%
Republican Party Primary Results
Republican	Pete Corpstein (incumbent)	6,896	40.74%
Republican	Cal Holman (incumbent)	6,336	37.44%
Republican	Bill Shelton	3,693	21.82%
Total votes		16,925	100.00%
Libertarian Party Primary Results
Libertarian	Debbie M. Norwitz	15	51.72%
Libertarian	Virginia M. Paulsen	14	48.28%
Total votes		29	100.00%

General Election Results
Party	Candidate	Votes	%
Republican	Pete Corpstein (incumbent)	22,697	33.34%
Republican	Cal Holman (incumbent)	21,263	31.24%
Democratic	David A. Gorman	9,931	14.59%
Democratic	Gene Bullock	9,009	13.24%
Libertarian	Virginia M. Paulsen	3,088	4.54%
Libertarian	Debbie M. Norwitz	2,081	3.06%
Total votes		68,069	100.00%
Republican hold			
Republican hold			

=== District 25 ===
Primary Election Results
Party	Candidate	Votes	%
Democratic Party Primary Results
Democratic	James Rice (Note: Withdrew from the election on 9/14/78.)	2,434	50.12%
Democratic	Louis Rhodes	2,422	49.88%
Total votes		4,856	100.00%
Republican Party Primary Results
Republican	Jacque Steiner (incumbent)	2,287	51.45%
Republican	D. Lee Jones (incumbent)	2,158	48.55%
Total votes		4,445	100.00%

General Election Results
Party	Candidate	Votes	%
Republican	Jacque Steiner (incumbent)	6,622	28.14%
Republican	D. Lee Jones (incumbent)	6,324	26.87%
Democratic	Louis Rhodes	5,858	24.89%
Democratic	Mark Winemiller (Note: Winemiller replaced Rice in the general election.)	4,728	20.09%
Total votes		23,532	100.00%
Republican hold			
Republican hold			

=== District 26 ===
Primary Election Results
Party	Candidate	Votes	%
Democratic Party Primary Results
Democratic	Mary C. Hegarty	1,927	57.80%
Democratic	Edith "Jo" Laetz	1,407	42.20%
Total votes		3,334	100.00%
Republican Party Primary Results
Republican	Frank Kelley (incumbent)	3,520	51.80%
Republican	Peter Kay (incumbent)	3,275	48.20%
Total votes		6,795	100.00%
Libertarian Party Primary Results
Libertarian	James C. Jefferies	10	52.63%
Libertarian	Joan Vanderslice	9	47.37%
Total votes		19	100.00%

General Election Results
Party	Candidate	Votes	%
Republican	Frank Kelley (incumbent)	9,551	32.86%
Republican	Peter Kay (incumbent)	8,862	30.49%
Democratic	Mary C. Hegarty	5,120	17.62%
Democratic	Edith "Jo" Laetz	3,724	12.81%
Libertarian	James C. Jefferies	925	3.18%
Libertarian	Joan Vanderslice	883	3.04%
Total votes		29,065	100.00%
Republican hold			
Republican hold			

=== District 27 ===
Primary Election Results
Party	Candidate	Votes	%
Democratic Party Primary Results
Democratic	Gene Kadish	2,494	44.29%
Democratic	Peggy Burton	2,222	39.46%
Democratic	Ted King	915	16.25%
Total votes		5,631	100.00%
Republican Party Primary Results
Republican	Juanita Harelson (incumbent)	3,345	39.17%
Republican	Doug Todd	2,474	28.97%
Republican	Lewis "Lew" Tambs	1,770	20.73%
Republican	William G. "Bill" Barks	950	11.13%
Total votes		8,539	100.00%
Libertarian Party Primary Results
Libertarian	Dennis Davis (Note: Withdrew from the election on 8/28/78.)	10	100.00%
Total votes		10	100.00%

General Election Results
Party	Candidate	Votes	%
Republican	Juanita Harelson (incumbent)	12,671	30.94%
Republican	Doug Todd	11,196	27.34%
Democratic	Gene Kadish	8,837	21.58%
Democratic	Peggy Burton	6,980	17.04%
Libertarian	Marilyn Steffen (Note: Steffen replaced Davis in the general election.)	1,272	3.11%
Total votes		40,956	100.00%
Republican hold			
Republican hold			

=== District 28 ===
Primary Election Results
Party	Candidate	Votes	%
Democratic Party Primary Results
Democratic	Tony Raineri	1,875	57.98%
Democratic	Scudder Gookin	1,359	42.02%
Total votes		3,234	100.00%
Republican Party Primary Results
Republican	Jim Skelly (incumbent)	4,395	45.30%
Republican	David B. Kret	2,870	29.58%
Republican	Betty Benneson	2,438	25.13%
Total votes		9,703	100.00%
Libertarian Party Primary Results
Libertarian	Mack C. Lake	6	100.00%
Total votes		6	100.00%

General Election Results
Party	Candidate	Votes	%
Republican	Jim Skelly (incumbent)	12,132	34.23%
Republican	David B. Kret	10,103	28.51%
Democratic	Tony Raineri	7,342	20.72%
Democratic	Scudder Gookin	5,042	14.23%
Libertarian	Mack C. Lake	822	2.32%
Total votes		35,441	100.00%
Republican hold			
Republican hold			

=== District 29 ===
Primary Election Results
Party	Candidate	Votes	%
Republican Party Primary Results
Republican	Donna J. Carlson (incumbent)	3,806	51.18%
Republican	Jim Cooper (incumbent)	3,630	48.82%
Total votes		7,436	100.00%

General Election Results
Party	Candidate	Votes	%
Republican	Donna J. Carlson (incumbent)	12,642	51.80%
Republican	Jim Cooper (incumbent)	11,765	48.20%
Total votes		24,407	100.00%
Republican hold			
Republican hold			

=== District 30 ===
Primary Election Results
Party	Candidate	Votes	%
Democratic Party Primary Results
Democratic	Doug Hale	2,486	53.38%
Democratic	Harold Lindmark	2,171	46.62%
Total votes		4,657	100.00%
Republican Party Primary Results
Republican	James J. Sossaman (incumbent)	5,203	53.02%
Republican	Carl J. Kunasek (incumbent)	4,610	46.98%
Total votes		9,813	100.00%

General Election Results
Party	Candidate	Votes	%
Republican	James J. Sossaman (incumbent)	15,981	36.94%
Republican	Carl J. Kunasek (incumbent)	14,092	32.57%
Democratic	Doug Hale	6,822	15.77%
Democratic	Harold Lindmark	6,368	14.72%
Total votes		43,263	100.00%
Republican hold			
Republican hold			
