= 1976 Arizona House of Representatives election =

1976 Arizona House of Representatives elections
- November 2, 1976

All 60 seats in the Arizona House 31 seats needed for a majority
	Majority party	Minority party
Leader	Stanley W. Akers	Craig E. Davids
Party	Republican	Democratic
Leader's seat	19th	7th
Last election	33	27
Seats after	38	22
Seat change	▲5	▼5
Speaker before election
Stanley W. Akers
Republican
Elected Speaker
Frank Kelley
Republican

The 1976 Arizona House of Representatives elections were held on November 2, 1976. Voters elected all 60 members of the Arizona House of Representatives in multi-member districts to serve a two-year term. The elections coincided with the elections for other offices, including U.S. Senate, U.S. House, and State Senate. Primary elections were held on September 7, 1976.

Prior to the elections, the Republicans held a majority of 33 seats over the Democrats' 27 seats.

Following the elections, Republicans maintained control of the chamber and expanded their majority to 38 Republicans to 22 Democrats, a net gain of five seats for Republicans.

The newly elected members served in the 33rd Arizona State Legislature, during which Republican Frank Kelley was elected as Speaker of the Arizona House. (Note: Kelley was elected as Speaker for the 33rd legislature, defeating Democratic Leader Representative Larry Bahill, who was also nominated for Speaker. The vote tally for Speaker was: Kelley-37 votes to Bahill-22 votes, with Representative Kelley not voting.)

== Summary of results by Arizona State Legislative district ==
District	Incumbent	Party	Elected representative	Outcome
1st	John U. Hays	Rep	John U. Hays	Rep hold
1st	Jim Thomas	Dem	James A. (Jim) Woodward	Rep gain
2nd	Sam A. McConnell Jr.	Rep	Sam A. McConnell Jr.	Rep hold
2nd	John Wettaw	Rep	John Wettaw	Rep hold
3rd	Benjamin Hanley	Dem	Benjamin Hanley	Dem hold
3rd	Daniel Peaches	Rep	Daniel Peaches	Rep hold
4th	E. C. "Polly" Rosenbaum	Dem	E. C. "Polly" Rosenbaum	Dem hold
4th	Edward G. (Bunch) Guerrero	Dem	Edward G. (Bunch) Guerrero	Dem hold
5th	Elwood W. Bradford	Dem	Elwood W. Bradford	Dem hold
5th	D. J. "Jim" Phillips	Dem	D. J. "Jim" Phillips	Dem hold
6th	Polly Getzwiller	Dem	Manuel "Manny" Marin	Dem hold
6th	G. T. "Tom" Alley	Dem	Jim Hartdegen	Rep gain
7th	Richard "Dick" Pacheco	Dem	Richard "Dick" Pacheco	Dem hold
7th	Craig E. Davids	Dem	Pete Villaverde	Dem hold
8th	James A. "Jim" Elliott	Dem	James A. "Jim" Elliott	Dem hold
8th	Steve J. Vukcevich	Dem	Steve J. Vukcevich	Dem hold
9th	Thomas Morgan Jr. (Note: Republican Tom Richey resigned on August 20, 1976, as representative from District 9. He was replaced by Thomas Morgan Jr., who was appointed by the Santa Cruz County Board of Supervisors on September 8, 1976, to fill the unexpired portion of Richey's term.)	Rep	Bill (William J.) English	Rep hold
9th	Jim Dewberry	Dem	"Mr. John" R. Humphreys, Sr.	Dem hold
10th	Larry Bahill	Dem	Larry Bahill	Dem hold
10th	Carmen F. Cajero	Dem	Carmen F. Cajero	Dem hold
11th	Emilio Carrillo	Dem	Emilio Carrillo	Dem hold
11th	R. P. "Bob" Fricks	Dem	Peter Goudinoff	Dem hold
12th	Thomas N. "Tom" Goodwin	Rep	Thomas N. "Tom" Goodwin	Rep hold
12th	Jo Cauthorn	Dem	John Kromko	Dem hold
13th	Sister Clare Dunn	Dem	Sister Clare Dunn	Dem hold
13th	Bruce Wheeler	Dem	Larry Hawke	Rep gain
14th	W. A. "Tony" Buehl	Rep	Arnold Jeffers	Rep hold
14th	Anna J. Cullinan	Dem	Emmett McLoughlin	Rep gain
15th	James B. Ratliff	Rep	James B. Ratliff	Rep hold
15th	J. Herbert Everett	Rep	J. Herbert Everett	Rep hold
16th	Don Stewart	Rep	Don Stewart	Rep hold
16th	Diane B. McCarthy	Rep	Diane B. McCarthy	Rep hold
17th	C. W. "Bill" Lewis	Rep	C. W. "Bill" Lewis	Rep hold
17th	Anne Lindeman	Rep	Patricia "Pat" Wright	Rep hold
18th	Burton S. Barr	Rep	Burton S. Barr	Rep hold
18th	Ruth Peck	Rep	Pete Dunn	Rep hold
19th	Tony West	Rep	Tony West	Rep hold
19th	Stan Akers	Rep	Stan Akers	Rep hold
20th	Gerald F. (Jerry) Moore	Dem	Gerald F. (Jerry) Moore	Dem hold
20th	Susan L. James	Dem	Lillian Jordan	Rep gain
21st	Elizabeth Adams Rockwell	Rep	Elizabeth Adams Rockwell	Rep hold
21st	Keith W. Hubbard	Rep	Keith W. Hubbard (Note: Republican Keith W. Hubbard of District 21 resigned effective 5:00 p.m., Tuesday, April 19, 1977. He was replaced by Donald J. Kenney on April 25, 1977, to fill the unexpired portion of Hubbard's term.)	Rep hold
22nd	Art Hamilton	Dem	Art Hamilton	Dem hold
22nd	R. G. "Danny" Peña	Dem	Earl V. Wilcox	Dem hold
23rd	Leon Thompson	Dem	Leon Thompson	Dem hold
23rd	Tony R. Abril Sr.	Dem	Tony R. Abril Sr.	Dem hold
24th	Pete Corpstein	Rep	Pete Corpstein	Rep hold
24th	Cal Holman	Rep	Cal Holman	Rep hold
25th	D. Lee Jones	Rep	D. Lee Jones	Rep hold
25th	Jacque Steiner (Note: Republican Jim Skelly resigned on June 28, 1976, as representative from District 25 to run from another district, District 28. He was replaced by Jacque Steiner, who was appointed by the Maricopa County Board of Supervisors on July 6, 1976, to fill the unexpired portion of Skelly's term.)	Rep	Jacque Steiner	Rep hold
26th	Frank Kelley	Rep	Frank Kelley	Rep hold
26th	Peter Kay	Rep	Peter Kay	Rep hold
27th	Juanita L. Harelson	Rep	Juanita L. Harelson	Rep hold
27th	Dick Flynn	Rep	Dick Flynn	Rep hold
28th	William E. "Bill" Rigel	Rep	William E. "Bill" Rigel	Rep hold
28th	Americo "Mac" Carvalho	Rep	Jim Skelly	Rep hold
29th	Jim Cooper	Rep	Jim Cooper	Rep hold
29th	Donna Carlson	Rep	Donna Carlson	Rep hold
30th	James J. Sossaman	Rep	James J. Sossaman	Rep hold
30th	Carl J. Kunasek	Rep	Carl J. Kunasek	Rep hold

== Detailed results ==
=== District 1 ===
Primary election results
Party	Candidate	Votes	%
Democratic Party primary results
Democratic	William "Bill" Pynchon	4,813	35.06%
Democratic	Lloyd C. Adams	4,526	32.97%
Democratic	Jim Thomas (incumbent) (Note: Withdrew from the election.)	4,387	31.96%
Total votes		13,726	100.00%
Republican Party primary results
Republican	John U. Hays (incumbent)	8,195	47.41%
Republican	James A. (Jim) Woodward	4,636	26.82%
Republican	H. G. "Jerry" Everall	4,455	25.77%
Total votes		17,286	100.00%

General election results
Party	Candidate	Votes	%
Republican	John U. Hays (incumbent)	19,434	33.33%
Republican	James A. (Jim) Woodward	15,078	25.86%
Democratic	William "Bill" Pynchon	12,862	22.06%
Democratic	Lloyd C. Adams	10,935	18.75%
Total votes		58,309	100.00%
Republican hold			
Republican gain from Democratic			

=== District 2 ===
Primary election results
Party	Candidate	Votes	%
Democratic Party primary results
Democratic	Gayle Sanford	6,476	100.00%
Total votes		6,476	100.00%
Republican Party primary results
Republican	Sam A. McConnell Jr. (incumbent)	3,626	50.13%
Republican	John Wettaw (incumbent)	3,607	49.87%
Total votes		7,233	100.00%

General election results
Party	Candidate	Votes	%
Republican	John Wettaw (incumbent)	12,954	39.28%
Republican	Sam A. McConnell Jr. (incumbent)	10,756	32.62%
Democratic	Gayle Sanford	9,267	28.10%
Total votes		32,977	100.00%
Republican hold			
Republican hold			

=== District 3 ===
Primary election results
Party	Candidate	Votes	%
Democratic Party primary results
Democratic	Benjamin Hanley (incumbent)	7,125	100.00%
Total votes		7,125	100.00%
Republican Party primary results
Republican	Daniel Peaches (incumbent)	2,391	100.00%
Total votes		2,391	100.00%

General election results
Party	Candidate	Votes	%
Democratic	Benjamin Hanley (incumbent)	12,900	57.42%
Republican	Daniel Peaches (incumbent)	9,565	42.58%
Total votes		22,465	100.00%
Democratic hold			
Republican hold			

=== District 4 ===
Primary election results
Party	Candidate	Votes	%
Democratic Party primary results
Democratic	Edward G. (Bunch) Guerrero (incumbent)	10,391	51.63%
Democratic	E. C. "Polly" Rosenbaum (incumbent)	9,736	48.37%
Total votes		20,127	100.00%
Republican Party primary results
Republican	Chet Hawley	3,480	100.00%
Total votes		3,480	100.00%

General election results
Party	Candidate	Votes	%
Democratic	E. C. "Polly" Rosenbaum (incumbent)	12,951	36.01%
Democratic	Edward G. (Bunch) Guerrero (incumbent)	11,578	32.19%
Republican	Chet Hawley	11,439	31.80%
Total votes		35,968	100.00%
Democratic hold			
Democratic hold			

=== District 5 ===
Primary election results
Party	Candidate	Votes	%
Democratic Party primary results
Democratic	D.J. "Jim" Phillips (incumbent)	5,561	54.61%
Democratic	Elwood W. Bradford (incumbent)	4,623	45.39%
Total votes		10,184	100.00%

General election results
Party	Candidate	Votes	%
Democratic	D. J. "Jim" Phillips (incumbent)	11,944	55.09%
Democratic	Elwood W. Bradford (incumbent)	9,737	44.91%
Total votes		21,681	100.00%
Democratic hold			
Democratic hold			

=== District 6 ===
Primary election results
Party	Candidate	Votes	%
Democratic Party primary results
Democratic	Manuel "Manny" Marin	2,167	17.53%
Democratic	Robert M. Garcia	1,994	16.13%
Democratic	Joan Foster Koenig	1,840	14.88%
Democratic	William J. (Jay) Baldock	1,689	13.66%
Democratic	G.T. Alley (incumbent)	1,532	12.39%
Democratic	Russell A. (Russ) Boshart	1,040	8.41%
Democratic	Doug Ballard	1,026	8.30%
Democratic	Ossie Owens	704	5.69%
Democratic	Lee L. Fitch	371	3.00%
Total votes		12,363	100.00%
Republican Party primary results
Republican	Jim Hartdegen	2,098	100.00%
Total votes		2,098	100.00%

General election results
Party	Candidate	Votes	%
Republican	Jim Hartdegen	7,095	30.73%
Democratic	Manuel "Manny" Marin	6,595	28.57%
Democratic	Robert M. Garcia	6,189	26.81%
Independent	Harry Ellen	3,208	13.90%
Total votes		23,087	100.00%
Republican gain from Democratic			
Democratic hold			

=== District 7 ===
Primary election results
Party	Candidate	Votes	%
Democratic Party primary results
Democratic	Richard "Dick" Pacheco (incumbent)	7,834	57.47%
Democratic	Pete Villaverde	5,797	42.53%
Total votes		13,631	100.00%
Republican Party primary results
Republican	Alvin Kempton (Note: Was a write-in candidate in the primary election.)	70	100.00%
Total votes		70	100.00%

General election results
Party	Candidate	Votes	%
Democratic	Richard "Dick" Pacheco (incumbent)	11,227	44.25%
Democratic	Pete Villaverde	8,311	32.75%
Independent	Eunice L. Stephens	5,836	23.00%
Total votes		25,374	100.00%
Democratic hold			
Democratic hold			

=== District 8 ===
Primary election results
Party	Candidate	Votes	%
Democratic Party primary results
Democratic	James A. "Jim" Elliott (incumbent)	7,097	36.72%
Democratic	Steve J. Vukcevich (incumbent)	6,299	32.60%
Democratic	Mike Bibb	5,929	30.68%
Total votes		19,325	100.00%

General election results
Party	Candidate	Votes	%
Democratic	James A. "Jim" Elliott (incumbent)	14,464	51.94%
Democratic	Steve J. Vukcevich (incumbent)	13,383	48.06%
Total votes		27,847	100.00%
Democratic hold			
Democratic hold			

=== District 9 ===
Primary election results
Party	Candidate	Votes	%
Democratic Party primary results
Democratic	Granville J. (Jim) Foster	3,556	34.33%
Democratic	"Mr. John" R. Humphreys, Sr.	3,513	33.92%
Democratic	Sterling W. Mullaney	3,288	31.75%
Total votes		10,357	100.00%
Republican Party primary results
Republican	Bill (William J.) English	3,941	52.78%
Republican	Jeffrey J. Hill	3,526	47.22%
Total votes		7,467	100.00%

General election results
Party	Candidate	Votes	%
Republican	Bill (William J.) English	10,583	27.17%
Democratic	"Mr. John" R. Humphreys, Sr.	9,628	24.72%
Republican	Jeffrey J. Hill	9,464	24.30%
Democratic	Granville J. (Jim) Foster	9,273	23.81%
Total votes		38,948	100.00%
Republican hold			
Democratic hold			

=== District 10 ===
Primary election results
Party	Candidate	Votes	%
Democratic Party primary results
Democratic	Larry Bahill (incumbent)	3,288	31.55%
Democratic	Carmen F. Cajero (incumbent)	3,236	31.05%
Democratic	Gilbert Yslas Velez	2,081	19.97%
Democratic	Roy E. Woods	1,818	17.44%
Total votes		10,423	100.00%

General election results
Party	Candidate	Votes	%
Democratic	Larry Bahill (incumbent)	8,550	50.94%
Democratic	Carmen F. Cajero (incumbent)	8,233	49.06%
Total votes		16,783	100.00%
Democratic hold			
Democratic hold			

=== District 11 ===
Primary election results
Party	Candidate	Votes	%
Democratic Party primary results
Democratic	Emilio Carrillo (incumbent)	3,191	23.63%
Democratic	Peter Goudinoff	2,456	18.19%
Democratic	Bonnie Fricks	2,426	17.97%
Democratic	Grover C. Banks	2,414	17.88%
Democratic	Ernie Soto Navarro	1,568	11.61%
Democratic	Eugene H. Hays	1,449	10.73%
Total votes		13,504	100.00%
Republican Party primary results
Republican	Marian Cross	1,907	100.00%
Total votes		1,907	100.00%

General election results
Party	Candidate	Votes	%
Democratic	Peter Goudinoff	10,415	38.93%
Democratic	Emilio Carrillo (incumbent)	9,908	37.04%
Republican	Marian Cross	6,427	24.03%
Total votes		26,750	100.00%
Democratic hold			
Democratic hold			

=== District 12 ===
Primary election results
Party	Candidate	Votes	%
Democratic Party primary results
Democratic	Jo Cauthorn (incumbent)	5,049	36.54%
Democratic	John Kromko	4,790	34.67%
Democratic	Gretchen Fogel	3,978	28.79%
Total votes		13,817	100.00%
Republican Party primary results
Republican	Thomas N. "Tom" Goodwin (incumbent)	5,623	58.87%
Republican	John Oswalt	3,928	41.13%
Total votes		9,551	100.00%

General election results
Party	Candidate	Votes	%
Republican	Thomas N. "Tom" Goodwin (incumbent)	15,784	29.33%
Democratic	John Kromko	13,689	25.44%
Democratic	Jo Cauthorn (incumbent)	12,667	23.54%
Republican	John Oswalt	11,667	21.68%
Total votes		53,807	100.00%
Republican hold			
Democratic hold			

=== District 13 ===
Primary election results
Party	Candidate	Votes	%
Democratic Party primary results
Democratic	Sister Clare Dunn (incumbent)	6,495	46.57%
Democratic	Bruce Wheeler (incumbent)	5,206	37.33%
Democratic	L. H. (Lou) Brady	2,246	16.10%
Total votes		13,947	100.00%
Republican Party primary results
Republican	Larry Hawke	5,380	57.87%
Republican	Marie E. Monplaisir	3,916	42.13%
Total votes		9,296	100.00%

General election results
Party	Candidate	Votes	%
Democratic	Sister Clare Dunn (incumbent)	14,501	28.38%
Republican	Larry Hawke	13,228	25.88%
Democratic	Bruce Wheeler (incumbent)	13,217	25.86%
Republican	Marie E. Monplaisir	10,158	19.88%
Total votes		51,104	100.00%
Democratic hold			
Republican gain from Democratic			

=== District 14 ===
Primary election results
Party	Candidate	Votes	%
Democratic Party primary results
Democratic	Anna J. Cullinan (incumbent)	6,724	52.61%
Democratic	Art (Ray) Day	6,057	47.39%
Total votes		12,781	100.00%
Republican Party primary results
Republican	Emmett McLoughlin	6,434	50.21%
Republican	Arnold Jeffers	6,380	49.79%
Total votes		12,814	100.00%

General election results
Party	Candidate	Votes	%
Republican	Arnold Jeffers	19,422	30.19%
Republican	Emmett McLoughlin	17,047	26.50%
Democratic	Anna J. Cullinan (incumbent)	14,684	22.83%
Democratic	Art (Ray) Day	13,170	20.47%
Total votes		64,323	100.00%
Republican hold			
Republican gain from Democratic			

=== District 15 ===
Primary election results
Party	Candidate	Votes	%
Republican Party primary results
Republican	James B. Ratliff (incumbent)	6,726	51.54%
Republican	J. Herbert Everett (incumbent)	6,323	48.46%
Total votes		13,049	100.00%

General election results
Party	Candidate	Votes	%
Republican	James B. Ratliff (incumbent)	14,924	50.59%
Republican	J. Herbert Everett (incumbent)	14,578	49.41%
Total votes		29,502	100.00%
Republican hold			
Republican hold			

=== District 16 ===
Primary election results
Party	Candidate	Votes	%
Democratic Party primary results
Democratic	Ted J. Beilman	6,122	51.27%
Democratic	Nadine (Anne) Hannah	5,818	48.73%
Total votes		11,940	100.00%
Republican Party primary results
Republican	Don Stewart (incumbent)	6,225	36.17%
Republican	Diane B. McCarthy (incumbent)	5,719	33.23%
Republican	Jim Mahar	2,810	16.33%
Republican	Betty Canady	2,457	14.28%
Total votes		17,211	100.00%
Libertarian Party primary results
Libertarian	John Kannarr	8	100.00%
Total votes		8	100.00%

General election results
Party	Candidate	Votes	%
Republican	Diane B. McCarthy (incumbent)	16,697	28.63%
Republican	Don Stewart (incumbent)	16,531	28.35%
Democratic	Ted J. Beilman	14,078	24.14%
Democratic	Nadine (Anne) Hannah	10,993	18.85%
Libertarian	John Kannarr (Note: Was a write-in candidate in the general election.)	12	0.02%
Total votes		58,311	100.00%
Republican hold			
Republican hold			

=== District 17 ===
Primary election results
Party	Candidate	Votes	%
Democratic Party primary results
Democratic	Alfred N. (Al) Bolding	5,403	98.52%
Democratic	Howard O. Jacobson	81	1.48%
Democratic	Thomas A. Lenze	0	0.00%
Total votes		5,484	100.00%
Republican Party primary results
Republican	Patricia "Pat" Wright	8,155	39.77%
Republican	C. W. "Bill" Lewis (incumbent)	7,996	39.00%
Republican	John H. Hannigan	4,353	21.23%
Total votes		20,504	100.00%

General election results
Party	Candidate	Votes	%
Republican	Patricia "Pat" Wright	20,477	40.91%
Republican	C. W. "Bill" Lewis (incumbent)	19,065	38.09%
Democratic	Alfred N. (Al) Bolding	10,445	20.87%
Democratic	"Chili" Davis	68	0.14%
Total votes		50,055	100.00%
Republican hold			
Republican hold			

=== District 18 ===
Primary election results
Party	Candidate	Votes	%
Democratic Party primary results
Democratic	Patricia Turoff	4,123	50.46%
Democratic	Mike Longstreth	4,048	49.54%
Total votes		8,171	100.00%
Republican Party primary results
Republican	Burton S. Barr (incumbent)	5,314	32.38%
Republican	Pete Dunn	4,837	29.47%
Republican	Jeanne S. Chisholm	3,765	22.94%
Republican	Joe Smith	2,497	15.21%
Total votes		16,413	100.00%
Libertarian Party primary results
Libertarian	Fred R. Esser	7	100.00%
Total votes		7	100.00%

General election results
Party	Candidate	Votes	%
Republican	Pete Dunn	12,695	29.03%
Republican	Burton S. Barr (incumbent)	12,683	29.00%
Democratic	Mike Longstreth	8,260	18.89%
Democratic	Patricia Turoff	8,210	18.77%
Libertarian	Fred R. Esser	1,882	4.30%
Total votes		43,730	100.00%
Republican hold			
Republican hold			

=== District 19 ===
Primary election results
Party	Candidate	Votes	%
Democratic Party primary results
Democratic	J. David Rich	4,787	95.42%
Democratic	Laura Silva	228	4.54%
Democratic	Wilbert J. "Chili" Davis	2	0.04%
Total votes		5,017	100.00%
Republican Party primary results
Republican	Stan Akers (incumbent)	6,843	51.96%
Republican	Tony West (incumbent)	6,326	48.04%
Total votes		13,169	100.00%

General election results
Party	Candidate	Votes	%
Republican	Tony West (incumbent)	14,838	39.47%
Republican	Stan Akers (incumbent)	14,011	37.27%
Democratic	J. David Rich	8,748	23.27%
Total votes		37,597	100.00%
Republican hold			
Republican hold			

=== District 20 ===
Primary election results
Party	Candidate	Votes	%
Democratic Party primary results
Democratic	Gerald F. (Jerry) Moore (incumbent)	3,441	36.71%
Democratic	Robert E. Donovan	3,117	33.25%
Democratic	Susan L. "Sue" James (incumbent)	2,816	30.04%
Total votes		9,374	100.00%
Republican Party primary results
Republican	Lillian Jordan	4,086	56.27%
Republican	Apolonio "Hap" Barraza	3,176	43.73%
Total votes		7,262	100.00%

General election results
Party	Candidate	Votes	%
Democratic	Gerald F. (Jerry) Moore (incumbent)	9,466	28.17%
Republican	Lillian Jordan	9,017	26.83%
Democratic	Robert E. Donovan	8,073	24.02%
Republican	Apolonio "Hap" Barraza	7,053	20.99%
Total votes		33,609	100.00%
Democratic hold			
Republican gain from Democratic			

=== District 21 ===
Primary election results
Party	Candidate	Votes	%
Democratic Party primary results
Democratic	Mary Ellen Simonson	3,571	41.23%
Democratic	Tom Wheeler	2,724	31.45%
Democratic	John Patrick Helmick	2,366	27.32%
Total votes		8,661	100.00%
Republican Party primary results
Republican	Keith W. Hubbard (incumbent)	4,510	44.26%
Republican	Elizabeth Adams Rockwell (incumbent)	4,308	42.28%
Republican	James Vercellino	1,372	13.46%
Total votes		10,190	100.00%

General election results
Party	Candidate	Votes	%
Republican	Elizabeth Adams Rockwell (incumbent)	8,848	26.46%
Republican	Keith W. Hubbard (incumbent)	8,811	26.35%
Democratic	Mary Ellen Simonson	8,422	25.19%
Democratic	Tom Wheeler	7,353	21.99%
Total votes		33,434	100.00%
Republican hold			
Republican hold			

=== District 22 ===
Primary election results
Party	Candidate	Votes	%
Democratic Party primary results
Democratic	Art Hamilton (incumbent)	2,283	24.23%
Democratic	Earl V. Wilcox	2,219	23.55%
Democratic	E. T. Ernie Hernandez	1,863	19.77%
Democratic	R. G. "Danny" Peña (incumbent)	1,835	19.47%
Democratic	Pete Cruz Barraza	1,224	12.99%
Total votes		9,424	100.00%
Republican Party primary results
Republican	Reta Graham	1,472	100.00%
Total votes		1,472	100.00%

General election results
Party	Candidate	Votes	%
Democratic	Art Hamilton (incumbent)	7,271	39.93%
Democratic	Earl V. Wilcox	7,030	38.60%
Republican	Reta Graham	3,910	21.47%
Total votes		18,211	100.00%
Democratic hold			
Democratic hold			

=== District 23 ===
Primary election results
Party	Candidate	Votes	%
Democratic Party primary results
Democratic	Leon Thompson (incumbent)	2,411	31.18%
Democratic	Tony R. Abril (incumbent)	2,136	27.63%
Democratic	Ben Moreno	1,877	24.28%
Democratic	Louis Monteilh	1,308	16.92%
Total votes		7,732	100.00%
Republican Party primary results
Republican	W. R. (Bill) Hughes	408	54.55%
Republican	Bennie Joe Brown	340	45.45%
Total votes		748	100.00%

General election results
Party	Candidate	Votes	%
Democratic	Leon Thompson (incumbent)	5,375	41.06%
Democratic	Tony R. Abril, Sr. (incumbent)	5,268	40.24%
Republican	W. R. (Bill) Hughes	1,313	10.03%
Republican	Bennie Joe Brown	1,134	8.66%
Total votes		13,090	100.00%
Democratic hold			
Democratic hold			

=== District 24 ===
Primary election results
Party	Candidate	Votes	%
Democratic Party primary results
Democratic	Judith W. Leiby	6,090	100.00%
Total votes		6,090	100.00%
Republican Party primary results
Republican	Pete Corpstein (incumbent)	12,870	50.77%
Republican	Cal Holman (incumbent)	12,482	49.23%
Total votes		25,352	100.00%

General election results
Party	Candidate	Votes	%
Republican	Pete Corpstein (incumbent)	27,089	38.36%
Republican	Cal Holman (incumbent)	26,618	37.69%
Democratic	Judith W. Leiby	16,914	23.95%
Total votes		70,621	100.00%
Republican hold			
Republican hold			

=== District 25 ===
Primary election results
Party	Candidate	Votes	%
Democratic Party primary results
Democratic	Louis Rhodes	3,142	34.08%
Democratic	James Rice	3,087	33.48%
Democratic	Pauline Hughes	2,991	32.44%
Total votes		9,220	100.00%
Republican Party primary results
Republican	Jacque Steiner (incumbent)	3,329	37.35%
Republican	D. Lee Jones (incumbent)	3,093	34.71%
Republican	Charles R. Wilson	1,297	14.55%
Republican	Roberta Carlin	1,193	13.39%
Total votes		8,912	100.00%

General election results
Party	Candidate	Votes	%
Republican	Jacque Steiner (incumbent)	8,635	27.09%
Republican	D. Lee Jones (incumbent)	7,848	24.62%
Democratic	Louis Rhodes	7,785	24.42%
Democratic	James Rice	7,613	23.88%
Total votes		31,881	100.00%
Republican hold			
Republican hold			

=== District 26 ===
Primary election results
Party	Candidate	Votes	%
Democratic Party primary results
Democratic	Richard Towson Biedler	3,808	96.38%
Democratic	Mary C. Hegarty	143	3.62%
Total votes		3,951	100.00%
Republican Party primary results
Republican	Frank Kelley (incumbent)	7,061	51.23%
Republican	Peter Kay (incumbent)	6,723	48.77%
Total votes		13,784	100.00%

General election results
Party	Candidate	Votes	%
Republican	Frank Kelley (incumbent)	14,291	40.55%
Republican	Peter Kay (incumbent)	13,179	37.40%
Democratic	Richard Towson Biedler	7,769	22.05%
Total votes		35,239	100.00%
Republican hold			
Republican hold			

=== District 27 ===
Primary election results
Party	Candidate	Votes	%
Democratic Party primary results
Democratic	Gene Kadish	5,085	51.96%
Democratic	K. R. "Randy" Jackson	4,702	48.04%
Total votes		9,787	100.00%
Republican Party primary results
Republican	Juanita L. Harelson (incumbent)	6,898	50.87%
Republican	Dick Flynn (incumbent)	6,663	49.13%
Total votes		13,561	100.00%

General election results
Party	Candidate	Votes	%
Republican	Juanita L. Harelson (incumbent)	18,169	30.69%
Republican	Dick Flynn (incumbent)	16,855	28.47%
Democratic	Gene Kadish	13,982	23.62%
Democratic	K. R. "Randy" Jackson	10,201	17.23%
Total votes		59,207	100.00%
Republican hold			
Republican hold			

=== District 28 ===
Primary election results
Party	Candidate	Votes	%
Republican Party primary results
Republican	Jim Skelly	6,370	36.67%
Republican	William E. "Bill" Rigel (incumbent)	5,373	30.93%
Republican	Roberta Unterberger	4,101	23.61%
Republican	Jonathan Louis Haas	1,525	8.78%
Total votes		17,369	100.00%
Libertarian Party primary results
Libertarian	Helen J. Stevens	6	100.00%
Total votes		6	100.00%

General election results
Party	Candidate	Votes	%
Republican	Jim Skelly	17,736	44.95%
Republican	William E. "Bill" Rigel (incumbent)	15,854	40.18%
Libertarian	Helen J. Stevens	5,866	14.87%
Total votes		39,456	100.00%
Republican hold			
Republican hold			

=== District 29 ===
Primary election results
Party	Candidate	Votes	%
Democratic Party primary results
Democratic	Phyllis Royer	3,213	51.07%
Democratic	M. Scott Phelps	3,078	48.93%
Total votes		6,291	100.00%
Republican Party primary results
Republican	Jim Cooper (incumbent)	6,599	50.77%
Republican	Donna Carlson (incumbent)	6,398	49.23%
Total votes		12,997	100.00%

General election results
Party	Candidate	Votes	%
Republican	Donna Carlson (incumbent)	14,078	34.36%
Republican	Jim Cooper (incumbent)	13,373	32.64%
Democratic	Phyllis Royer	6,890	16.82%
Democratic	M. Scott Phelps	6,627	16.18%
Total votes		40,968	100.00%
Republican hold			
Republican hold			

=== District 30 ===
Primary election results
Party	Candidate	Votes	%
Democratic Party primary results
Democratic	Beatrice (Betty) B. Eilers	15	100.00%
Total votes		15	100.00%
Republican Party primary results
Republican	James J. Sossaman (incumbent)	7,163	44.76%
Republican	Carl J. Kunasek (incumbent)	5,994	37.46%
Republican	Irene Leitch	2,846	17.78%
Total votes		16,003	100.00%

General election results
Party	Candidate	Votes	%
Republican	James J. Sossaman (incumbent)	20,426	52.96%
Republican	Carl J. Kunasek (incumbent)	18,143	47.04%
Total votes		38,569	100.00%
Republican hold			
Republican hold			
