= Karen R. Mills =

American politician from Arizona

Karen R. Mills was an American state legislator in Arizona. A Republican, she lived in Glendale, Arizona and represented Maricopa County from 1985 to 1991.

Mills served as Chair of the House Financial Institution & Insurance Committee. She sponsored legislation targeting money laundering with revised regulations that included money transmitters to produce transaction reports.

== See also ==
- 1992 Arizona House of Representatives election
- 1984 Arizona House of Representatives election
- 1986 Arizona House of Representatives election
- 1988 Arizona House of Representatives election
- 1990 Arizona House of Representatives election
