= Robert McLendon =

American politician (1936–2022)

Member of the Arizona House of Representatives from the 5th district
- In office January 1983 – January 2001
- Preceded by: Morris Courtright
- Succeeded by: Robert Cannell

Personal details
- Born: November 24, 1936 Romney, Texas, U.S.
- Died: March 9, 2022 (aged 85)
- Party: Democratic
- Spouse: Sandy
- Profession: Politician

Robert McLendon (November 24, 1936 – March 9, 2022) was an American politician who served as a member of the Arizona House of Representatives. McLendon served nine terms in the House from January 1983 through January 2001, representing district 5. The amendment to the Arizona Constitution which limited politicians to serving four consecutive terms in either house was passed in 1992, after he had already served five terms. McLendon died on March 9, 2022, at the age of 85.
