= Sterling Ridge =

American politician (1936–2012)

Member of the Arizona House of Representatives from the 17th district
- In office 1982–1988

Mayor of Glendale, Arizona
- In office 1976–1980

Member of the Glendale City Council
- In office 1974–1976

Personal details
- Born: James Sterling Ridge; October 29, 1936 Alexandria, Louisiana, U.S.
- Died: April 18, 2012 (aged 75) Glendale, Arizona, U.S.
- Party: Republican
- Spouse: Barbara
- Children: 4
- Education: Glendale High School; Phoenix College (AA); Arizona State College (BA)
- Profession: Politician

James Sterling Ridge Sr. (October 29, 1936 – April 18, 2012) was an American politician.

== Biography ==
Born in Alexandria, Louisiana, Ridge graduated from Glendale High School in Glendale, Arizona, Phoenix College, and Arizona State College. He was a newspaper reporter for the Arizona Republic and the Phoenix Gazette. He served in the Arizona House of Representatives from the 17th district from 1982 to 1988 and was a Republican. Ridge also served on the Glendale City Council and was mayor. He died in Glendale.
