= Morris Courtright =

American politician (1930–2010)

Morris "Court" Courtright Jr. (May 2, 1930 – May 29, 2010) was an American politician and a Roman Catholic priest.

Courtright was born in Saginaw, Michigan. He served in the United States Air Force, during the Korean War and the Vietnam War, and was commissioned a major. Courtright then moved to Flagstaff, Arizona after he retired from the United States Air Force, He went to Columbia Pacific University and taught at Northern Arizona University. Courtright was involved with broadcasting engineering and the crewed space flights. Courtright served in the Arizona House of Representatives from 1978 to 1983 and was a Republican. Courtright was ordained a nondenominational minister in 2003 and then was ordained a Roman Catholic priest in 2006. Courtright served as an Arizona Wing Chaplain for the Civil Air Patrol. He died in Scottsdale, Arizona and was buried in the National Memorial Cemetery of Arizona, in Phoenix, Arizona.
