= Bob Usdane =

American politician (1936–2011)

Robert Bruce "Bob" Usdane (March 11, 1936 – January 4, 2011) was an American, Republican politician.

Usdane served in the Arizona Senate from 1977 to 1991 and was President of the Arizona Senate. At the time of his death Usdane resided in Scottsdale, Arizona.
