= Lito Peña =

American politician

Manuel "Lito" G. Peña Jr. (November 17, 1924 - October 12, 2013) was a state legislator and activist in the US state of Arizona. Known informally as the "godfather" of the Democrats in the Arizona Senate, Peña served in the state legislature for 30 years, from 1967 to 1996. He was also remembered for his work in school desegregation and voter registration.

== Personal life ==
Peña was born on a ranch in Cashion, Arizona in 1924 and grew up in nearby Tolleson, where his family were merchants. He was drafted into the Army in 1945 and served as a heavy weapons specialist in Korea.

== Political career ==
In 1946, Peña organized the first voter registration drive in Tolleson, raising the number of registered voters from 150 to 750. Peña also played a leading role in the desegregation of the Tolleson school, serving as the vice president of the group that successfully brought suit to end racial segregation in Tolleson in Gonzales v. Sheely in 1951. He was further inspired in his activism by meeting Cesar Chavez in the Community Service Organization in the 1950s.

Peña began his legislative career in the Arizona House following the 1966 reform that replaced at-large county representation with districts, thus making it possible for Hispanic lawmakers to win office. He switched to the Arizona State Senate in 1972. In total he served from the 28th Arizona State Legislature in 1967 through to the 42nd Arizona State Legislature in 1996.

He is the namesake of an elementary school in the Cartwright Elementary School District in Phoenix, which was named for him in 2003.
