= Jack Taylor (Arizona politician) =

Arizona politician (1907–1995)

Jerald Jackson "Jack" Taylor

Mayor of Mesa, Arizona
- In office 1966–1972
- Preceded by: Egbert J. Brown
- Succeeded by: Eldon W. Cooley

Arizona State Representative for Mesa
- In office 1973–1975

Arizona State Senator for Mesa
- In office 1975–1989
- Succeeded by: Lester Pearce

Personal details
- Born: May 23, 1907 Sonora, Texas, US Mesa, Arizona
- Died: March 31, 1995 (aged 87) Mesa, Arizona
- Resting place: City of Mesa Cemetery
- Party: Republican
- Spouse: Eda Sarah Jane Staton Taylor
- Relations: Roger L. Worsley (former son-in-law)
- Children: 2
- Parent(s): Walter William and Ida Brigham Page Taylor
- Occupation: Educator

Jerald Jackson Taylor (May 23, 1907 – March 31, 1995), was an Arizona politician and schoolteacher. A Republican, he served as mayor of Mesa, Arizona, and in both houses of the Arizona State Legislature.

Preceded by Egbert J. Brown	Mayor of Mesa, Arizona; 1966–1972	Succeeded by Eldon W. Cooley
Preceded by Missing	Arizona State Senator for Mesa; 1975–1989	Succeeded by Lester Pearce
