= Jaime Gutierrez =

American politician

Member of the Arizona Senate from the 11th district
- In office January 8, 1979 – January 11, 1993
- Preceded by: Frank J. Felix
- Succeeded by: Peter Goudinoff

Personal details
- Born: September 12, 1949 (age 76) Tucson, Arizona
- Party: Democratic

Jaime Gutierrez (born September 12, 1949) is an American politician who served in the Arizona Senate from the 11th district from 1979 to 1993.
