= Donald Kenney =

American politician

Member of the Arizona House of Representatives from the 19th district
- In office 1988–1991

Personal details
- Born: August 9, 1938 (age 88) Bisbee, Arizona, U.S.
- Party: Republican
- Education: University of Arizona, Brigham Young University, University of Southern California
- Occupation: real estate broker

Donald James Kenney (born August 9, 1938) is an American Republican politician. He served in District 19 of the Arizona House of Representatives from 1977 to 1991. He was charged with corruption in the 1991 AzScam undercover sting operation, which forced his resignation. He served 14 months in prison after he was convicted. Following his conviction, he was disbarred in Arizona, and his real estate licence was revoked.

In 2012, it was discovered by San Diego Union-Tribune Watchdog that Kenney had moved to Carlsbad, California and was working as a real estate broker in San Diego County, and had re-obtained a licence using his son's identity. He was charged with perjury and forgery upon the discovery.
