= John Kromko =

American politician

John Kromko (born 1940) is a former Arizona state legislator. He served in the legislature from 1976 to 1990. He was instrumental in forcing several progressive reforms in the state despite its government being dominated by Republicans by repeatedly using the state's initiative process. In this way he, with others, was able to force the state, the last in the United States to do so, to provide Medicaid in 1982.
