= John Wettaw =

American academic and politician (1939–2018)

John F. Wettaw (April 17, 1939 – December 16, 2018) was a chemistry professor at Northern Arizona University and an Arizona politician.

== Biography ==
Wettaw was born in St. Louis, Missouri and graduated from Southern Illinois University Carbondale with a B.A. in chemistry in 1961 and obtained his Ph.D. in physical chemistry in 1967 from Michigan State University.

Wettaw taught chemistry for 47 years at NAU's department of chemistry, while simultaneously serving 28 years in the Arizona Legislature. He holds the record for the most consecutive years served in the Arizona legislature by a Republican. Wettaw lived in Flagstaff, Arizona. He served in the Arizona House of Representatives from 1972 to 1992 and in the Arizona Senate from 1993 until retiring in 2001. In 1999, NAU dedicated their biochemistry building to him. He retired from NAU in 2014.

Wettaw died at the age of 79 on December 16, 2018.
