= Polly Rosenbaum =

American politician (1899–2003)

Member of the Arizona House of Representatives from the 4th district
- In office January 12, 1949 – 1995
- Preceded by: William Rosenbaum

Personal details
- Born: Edwynne Cutler; September 4, 1899 Ollie, Iowa, U.S.
- Died: December 28, 2003 (aged 104) Phoenix, Arizona, U.S.
- Party: Democratic
- Spouse: William Rosenbaum (m. 1939; died 1949)
- Education: University of Colorado Boulder; University of Southern California
- Occupation: Teacher, legislator

Edwynne Cutler "Polly" Rosenbaum (September 4, 1899 – December 28, 2003) was a teacher and politician who was Arizona's longest-serving state legislator, representing Gila County in the Arizona House of Representatives for 46 years.

== Life and career before entering the state legislature ==
Polly Rosenbaum was born Edwynne Cutler in Ollie, Iowa, in 1899. She moved to Colorado as a child and attended the University of Colorado Boulder, where she graduated in 1922 with a bachelor's degree in history and political science. She taught school in Iowa, Colorado, and in Lusk, Wyoming, and undertook graduate study at the University of Southern California, which awarded her a master's degree in education in 1929. In 1929 she moved to Hayden, Arizona, a mining town, to take a teaching job. She supplemented her teacher's pay by working as a secretary for the Inspiration Consolidated Copper Company.

Polly Cutler's secretarial work took her to the Arizona State Capitol in Phoenix, where she met Representative William "Rosey" Rosenbaum, whom she married in 1939. Rosey Rosenbaum, who represented Gila County, later became Speaker of the House.

== Career in Arizona legislature ==
When her husband died unexpectedly in 1949 after 22 years in the legislature, Polly Rosenbaum was appointed to fill the remainder of her husband's term, taking office on January 12, 1949.

When the legislative seat came up for election in 1950, Rosenbaum ran for the seat in her own right and won. A Democrat, she was to win a total of 22 elections to two-year terms. She retired from the legislature at the age of 95 after losing the November 1994 election to a political newcomer who benefited from redistricting (which had resulted in her district including parts of eight counties) and an anti-incumbency mood. Several weeks after her election loss, former U.S. Senator Barry Goldwater, an Arizona Republican, told the Los Angeles Times: "People in this state still can't believe she was defeated.... She's so damn good that everybody wanted to see her stay in the Legislature as long as she wanted—and I have a hunch that was where she planned to spend her life."

As a legislator, Rosenbaum was particularly noted for her efforts on behalf of Arizona's rural areas and her support for education, libraries, museums, and historic preservation. She was chairman of the House Administration Committee for 16 years and later was chairman of the House Education Committee. As Education Committee chairman, she is credited with passing legislation in 1964 to provide education for homebound children in Arizona.

Rosenbaum was also noted for her commitment to the interests of women. She once said of Arizona's women: "The women really won the West, not the men. The women are the ones who got the libraries and worked for the schools." Although she voted against ratification of the Equal Rights Amendment to the U.S. Constitution, in 1968 she was one of a group of eight women members of the Arizona House who combed through the Arizona Constitution to eliminate language that discriminated on the basis of gender. She also is credited with getting spittoons removed from the House chambers and barring the wearing of miniskirts by its female pages.

== Later life and death ==
At the time of her departure from the Arizona legislature at age 95, Rosenbaum was still known for her high energy level, almost always climbing the stairs to her third-floor office instead of using the elevator. As a volunteer at the Arizona Mining and Mineral Museum, she led guided tours for school groups and was known for her habit of running up the stairs. She remained active for the rest of her life. After her death, the Arizona Republic said of her in an editorial-page remembrance: "Right up to the end, she kept on giving speeches, serving on committees and even trying to get rose bushes planted in front of the Capitol again."

Rosenbaum died from congestive heart failure in Phoenix at age 104 on December 28, 2003.

== Honors, awards, and legacy ==
Rosenbaum was the recipient of many honors and awards during her long life, as well as some posthumous honors. She was Globe's Business and Professional Woman of the Year in 1960 and the Gila County Woman of the Year in 1974. In 1982 her colleagues in the state legislature passed a resolution giving her the title "First Lady of the Arizona Legislature." In 1983 she received the First Legislative Award of Arizona Library Friends. Northern Arizona University, the University of Phoenix, and Arizona State University awarded her honorary degrees. In 2006 she was named to the Arizona Women's Hall of Fame.

She is the namesake of two state government buildings in Phoenix. The Polly Rosenbaum Building is an historic building that houses the Arizona Mining and Mineral Museum. The Polly Rosenbaum State Archives and History Building, completed in 2008 and dedicated in 2009, is the home of the Arizona State Library, Archives and Public Records.

In 1999, the year of her 100th birthday, the Arizona State Library, Archives and Public Records established the Polly Rosenbaum Award in her honor, recognizing her support for libraries, museums, and archives, and the preservation of the state's cultural history. Known as the "Polly" Award, this award honors elected or appointed officials who "cherish Arizona's rich cultural resources and support the work of the Arizona State Library, Archives and Public Records." It is presented each year on February 14, Arizona Statehood Day. The Polly Rosenbaum Writing Contest is conducted each year by the Arizona Educational Foundation, stimulating and recognizing creative writing by students in grades 7 through 12.
