= Richard Pacheco (politician) =

American politician

Member of the Arizona House of Representatives
- In office January 1, 1969 – December 31, 1992
- Constituency: 2nd district (1969–1970); 9th district (1971–1972); 7th district (1973–1992)

Personal details
- Born: November 2, 1924 Las Vegas, New Mexico, U.S.
- Died: September 5, 2015 (aged 90) Chandler, Arizona, U.S.
- Party: Democratic
- Spouse: Karen Pacheco
- Education: New Mexico Highlands University

Richard Pacheco (November 2, 1924 – September 5, 2015) was an American politician. He served as a Democratic member for the 2nd, 9th, and 7th districts of the Arizona House of Representatives.

== Life and career ==
Pacheco was born in Las Vegas, New Mexico. He attended New Mexico Highlands University and served in the United States Army as a paratrooper. Afterwards, he served as a real estate salesman, mine safety supervisor and administrative assistant at Anamax Mining Company, and as a manager for City Loan and Finance Company in Nogales, Arizona.

Pacheco represented several districts during his twelve terms in the Arizona House of Representatives. After the death of state representative Clare Dunn, Pacheco was elected as Assistant Minority Leader to replace her.

Pacheco died in September 2015 in Chandler, Arizona, at the age of 90.
