= Peter Goudinoff =

American politician

Member of the Arizona Senate from the 11th district
- In office January 11, 1993 – January 13, 1997
- Preceded by: Jaime Gutierrez
- Succeeded by: Elaine Richardson

Member of the Arizona House of Representatives from the 11th district
- In office January 10, 1977 – January 11, 1993
- Preceded by: Emilio Carrillo; R.P. "Bob" Fricks
- Succeeded by: Elaine Richardson; Jorge Luis Garcia

Personal details
- Born: March 28, 1941 (age 85) New York City, New York
- Party: Democratic

Peter Goudinoff (born March 28, 1941) is an American politician who served in the Arizona House of Representatives from the 11th district from 1977 to 1993 and in the Arizona Senate from the 11th district from 1993 to 1997.
