= Art Hamilton =

American Arizona politician

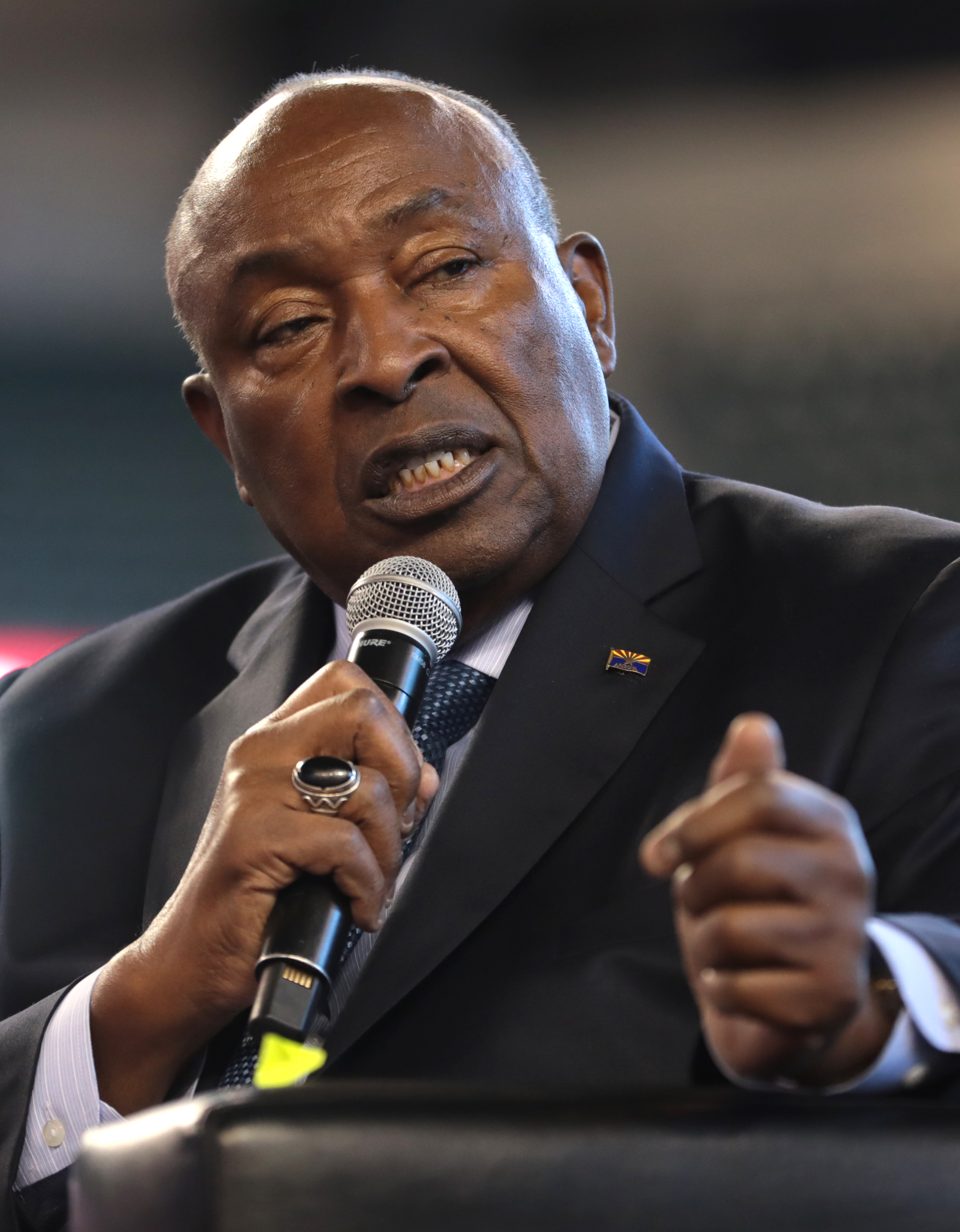

Member of the Arizona House of Representatives from the 22nd district
- In office January 19, 1973 – January 11, 1999
- Preceded by: District created
- Succeeded by: Richard Miranda

President of the National Conference of State Legislatures
- In office 1992–1993
- Preceded by: Bud Burke
- Succeeded by: Robert Connor

Personal details
- Born: January 19, 1948 (age 78) Phoenix, Arizona
- Party: Democratic

Art Hamilton (born January 19, 1948) is an American politician who served in the Arizona House of Representatives from the 22nd district from 1973 to 1999.
