= James Hartdegen =

American politician

Member of the Arizona House of Representatives
- In office 1977–1991

Personal details
- Born: 1945 (age 80–81)
- Party: Republican

James Alan Hartdegen (born 1945) is an American Republican politician. He served in the Arizona House of Representatives from 1977 to 1991. He is a member of the board of the Central Arizona Project, representing Pinal County.

He was charged with corruption in the 1991 AzScam undercover sting operation, for accepting $440 over the contribution limit of $660, which forced his resignation.
