= Arizona Mining and Mineral Museum =

Former museum in Phoenix

Coordinates: 33°26′55″N 112°05′31″W

The Arizona Mining and Mineral Museum in Phoenix, Arizona, was a museum focused on minerals and mining. Last operated by the Arizona Historical Society, a state government agency, its exhibits included more than 3,000 minerals, rocks, fossils, and artifacts related to the mining industry. The museum closed in May 2011. In April 2017, legislation was passed to reopen the museum under the ownership of the University of Arizona.

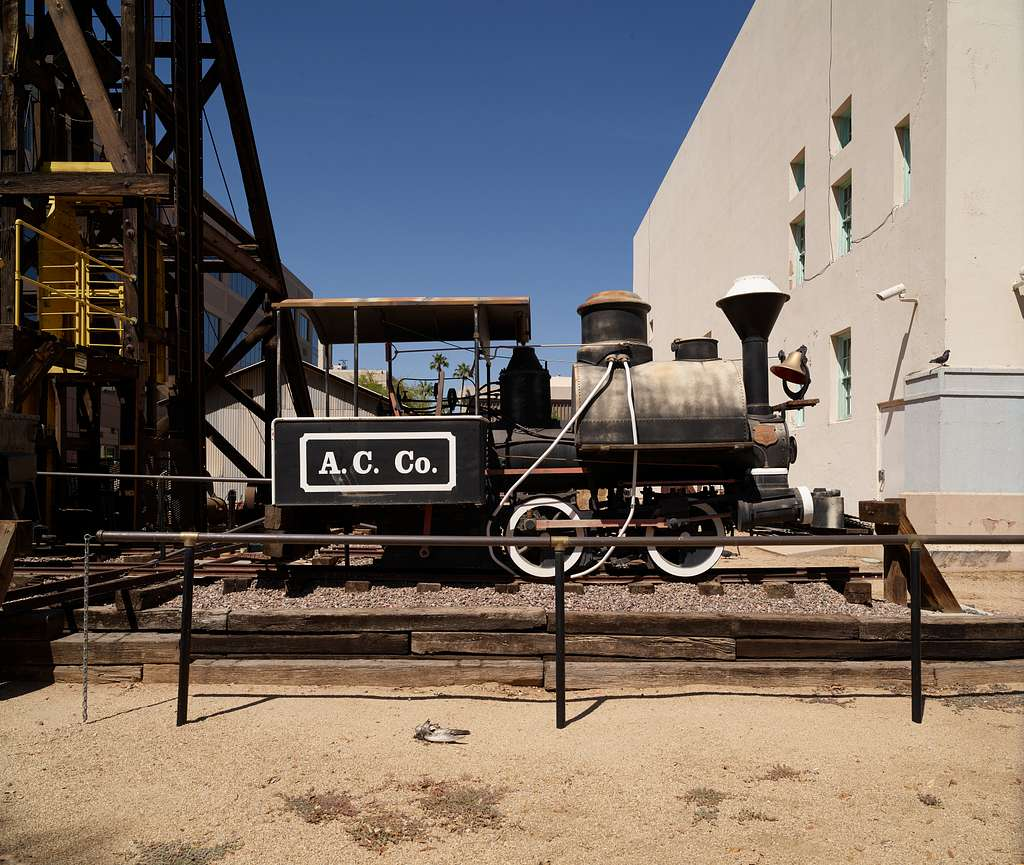
Old mining locomotive outside the Arizona Mining and Minerals Museum.

== History ==
The museum was started in 1884 as a temporary exhibit at Arizona's first territorial fair. The exhibit was very popular and was moved into a permanent building on the state fairgrounds in 1919. It was open only during state fairs until 1953, when six Arizona mining companies provided funds for its year-round operation as a formal museum. Both the museum and the offices of its sponsoring agency, the Arizona Department of Mines and Mineral Resources, were located in a building on the state fairgrounds. In 1991 the museum and the department offices vacated the facility at the fairgrounds, which was by then dilapidated and did not have suitable climate conditions for archival storage of documents, and moved to the museum's current location, the former El Zaribah Shrine Auditorium in Phoenix. That same year the building was renamed the Polly Rosenbaum Building in recognition of the leadership of long-time state legislator Polly Rosenbaum in obtaining the historic building as a home for the museum.

== Transfer to Arizona Historical Society and closure ==
In 2010, the Arizona Historical Society took control of the museum under provisions of a new state law. The Society planned to convert the museum into a history museum to open for the centennial of Arizona statehood (February 14, 2012), to be named the Arizona Centennial Museum. The office of Governor Jan Brewer is credited with developing the concept for the centennial museum, which was proposed to focus on "Arizona's Five C's: cattle, copper, cotton, citrus and climate." Supporters of the museum conversion project estimated that they would need to raise $9 million in private donations to complete the project.

At an August 2010 meeting of the historical society's board of directors, it was reported that the museum transfer had been more complex than anticipated, due in large part to unanticipated liabilities associated with items in the museum collection that were on loan to the mineral museum. Some loaned specimens on display were valued in the "tens of thousands of dollars" range, and the museum is fully liable for any loss or damage to them. It was also reported that the Arizona Centennial Museum renovation would be eligible for $400,000 of Recovery Act funds and had received $1 million in donation pledges, but the Centennial fundraising organization did not yet have 501(c)(3) nonprofit status.

The museum was closed at the beginning of May 2011. The Arizona Historical Society had earlier announced that it would remain open through the end of the school year, but the museum was abruptly closed one month earlier without advance notice to employees or school groups that had planned tours. Parts of the collection were expected to be included in the planned centennial museum, which was to be called the Arizona Experience Museum.

== Collection ==
The mineral collection features displays of minerals from well-known Arizona mineral localities and specimens from Arizona copper mines, including a piece of native copper that is 8 feet (2.4 m) in its longest dimension. Displays on the lapidary arts feature faceted gemstones and cabochons made from Arizona minerals. Mineralogical principles are illustrated by displays on mineral crystal systems, crystal habits, fluorescent minerals, and causes of color. Unusual items in the mineral collection include a 206-pound (93 kg) piece of the Meteor Crater meteorite, fulgurites, a huge quartz geode divided into two halves that weigh 240 pounds (110 kg) each, Moon rocks, and bowls and spheres fabricated from semi-precious stones.

Several large pieces of historic and modern mining equipment are displayed outdoors in front of the museum building. Historic items in the outdoor display include a head frame from a mine in Bisbee, a baby gauge steam railroad locomotive built in 1882 that was used at a Phelps Dodge mine in Morenci, a stamp mill, and two rail cars used in mining. Modern items used in open-pit mining include a 13-foot (4.0 m) diameter truck tire and the 27-cubic-yard (21 m^{3}) bucket from an electric mining shovel used in the copper mine at Ray.

An exhibit room off the main gallery displays a mineral collection, kachina dolls, and other items donated by Rose Mofford, who was governor of Arizona at the time the museum relocated to its current site. As a supporter of the museum, Mofford has been quoted as saying that she would instruct her legal representative to disperse the collection to "the rural museums of Arizona" if the mining and mineral museum ever closes.
