= Polly Rosenbaum Building =

- El Zaribah Shrine Auditorium
- U.S. National Register of Historic Places
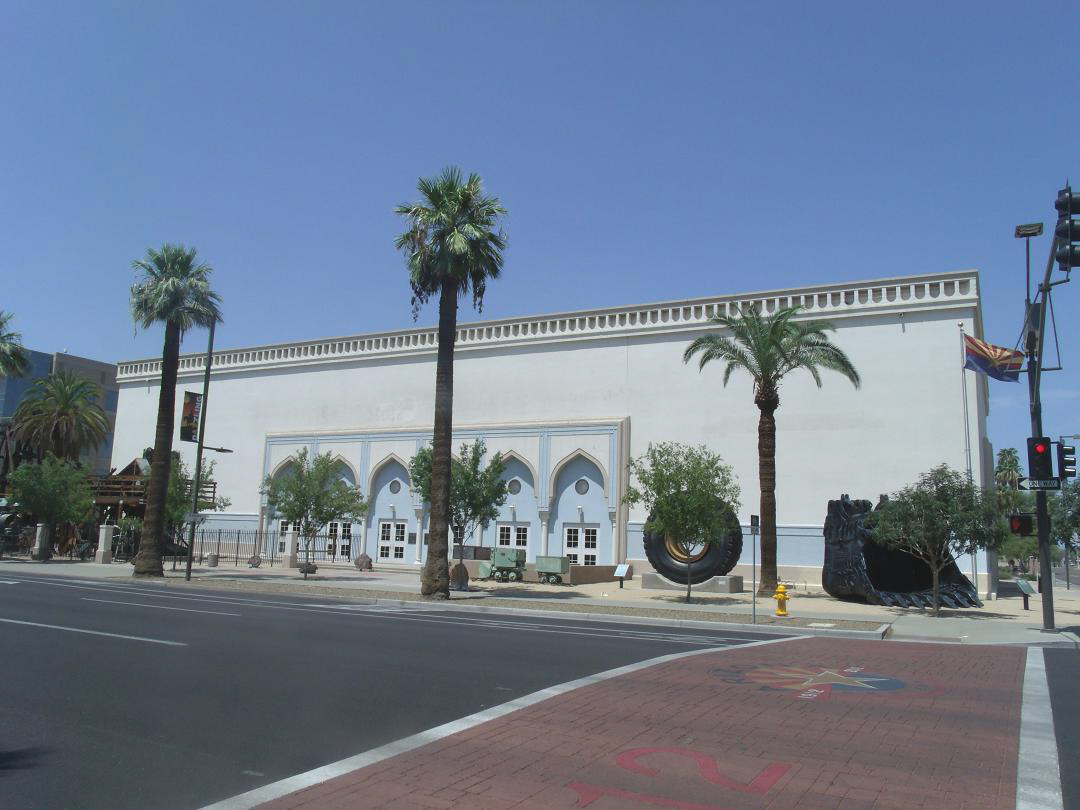
- The building as of 2012

- Location within Maricopa County, Arizona Location within Arizona Location within the United States
- Location: 1502 W. Washington St., Phoenix, Arizona
- Coordinates: 33°26′55″N 112°5′31″W
- Area: 0.8 acres (0.32 ha)
- Built: 1921
- Built by: Clinton Campbell
- Architect: Lescher & Mahoney
- Architectural style: Exotic Revival, Moorish Revival
- NRHP reference No.: 89000168
- Added to NRHP: March 9, 1989

The Polly Rosenbaum Building, formerly the El Zaribah Shrine Auditorium, is a building in Phoenix, Arizona, at the corner of 15th Avenue and Washington Street, that was built in 1921. The 18,000-square-foot (1,700 m^{2}) building formerly housed the Arizona Mining and Mineral Museum.

The building was completed in 1921 as a home for the activities of the El Zariabah Shrine unit, a local Shriners organization that had been formed in 1896. It was designed by architects Lescher & Mahoney and built by Clinton Campbell. It is an Exotic Revival/Moorish Revival style building. The building and its 0.8-acre (0.32 ha) property were listed on the National Register of Historic Places for the building's architecture in 1989 as "El Zaribah Shrine Auditorium". It was also listed on the Phoenix Historic Property Register at that time.

In 1988 the Shriners began construction of a new building and made plans to vacate the building at 15th and Washington, which was in an area where the state government was establishing a government mall. In late 1989, the Shriners completed their new auditorium building at 552 N. 40th Street, which now bears the name "El Zaribah Shrine Auditorium".

After the Shriners relocated, the state government of Arizona acquired their original building to house the museum and offices of the Arizona Department of Mines and Mineral Resources, which moved in in October 1991. The building was renamed the Polly Rosenbaum Building in honor of Polly Rosenbaum, a longtime member of the Arizona House of Representatives who, in collaboration with then-governor Rose Mofford, spearheaded efforts to obtain and renovate the building as a permanent home for the Department's mineral collection and archives. This is one of two Arizona state government buildings in Phoenix that are named for Rosenbaum; the other is the Polly Rosenbaum State Archives and History Building, located at 19th and Madison and completed in 2008.

In February 2010, Governor Jan Brewer announced that the Arizona Mining and Mineral Museum would become the Arizona Centennial Museum for the state's 2012 centennial celebration. The building was to be transferred from the Arizona Dept of Mines and Mineral Resources to the Centennial Commission then subsequently to the Arizona Historical Society. The mining museum was abruptly closed on May 1, 2011, but funding for the proposed museum did not materialize. In 2012 the building was closed and empty.

In 2016, the state legislature transferred the building to the University of Arizona for the development of an Arizona Mining, Mineral and Natural Resources Education Museum, and appropriated $12 million in 2022 for renovations to begin.
