= Arizona State Fairgrounds =

Entertainment complex in Phoenix, Arizona, U.S.

Coordinates: 33°28′10″N 112°05′51″W

- Interactive map of Arizona State Fairgrounds
- Address: 1826 W. McDowell Rd; Phoenix, Arizona; U.S.
- Owner: Arizona Exposition & State Fair

Tenants
- Arizona State Fair; Maricopa County Fair

The Arizona State Fairgrounds is a permanent fairgrounds on McDowell Road, Encanto Village, within the city of Phoenix, Arizona, United States. It is currently used yearly to host the Arizona State Fair and the Maricopa County Fair, the Maricopa County Home & Garden Show, the Arizona National Livestock Show, as well as for other events.

The Arizona Veterans Memorial Coliseum, an arena at the fairgrounds, hosted the Phoenix Suns of the National Basketball Association from 1968 to 1992. In 1992, the team moved to what is known today as Footprint Center.

The dirt oval track hosted AAA National Championship and USAC National Championship races in 1915 and from 1950 to 1963, and NASCAR Grand National races in 1951, 1955, 1956 and 1960. It was replaced by the Phoenix Raceway in 1964.

== History ==
The fairgrounds were created in 1905, when a volunteer organization, the Arizona Territorial Fair Association, purchased the property and first developed it. At that time, Arizona was not yet a state and had territory status. In 1909, the grounds were purchased by the Territorial Fair Commission, which became the State Fair Commission after statehood in 1912.

== Facilities ==
The fairgrounds site includes the following buildings:

- The Arizona Veterans Memorial Coliseum — a Modernist style 14,870-seat multipurpose indoor arena.
- The Party Gras, originally the Gem and Mineral Building — a historic 4,176 sq. ft. building built in 1918. It is the oldest building at the fairgrounds.
- Grandstand — a 1936-1937 WPA grandstand project with 5,000 covered seats, that replaced an older wooden structure that had burned down. The exterior of the grandstand has 23 bas-relief panels by David Carrick Swing and Florence Blakeslee, that were funded by the Federal Art Project. The Grandstand Arena is a historical outdoor area, is used for open-air events such as horse shows, dirt track events, mud bog spectaculars, races, rodeos, tractor pulls, and demolition derbies.
- WPA Administration Building, or the Civic Building — a historic 12,200 sq. ft. PWA Moderne style concrete building, built in 1938 by the Works Projects Administration−WPA, serving as their headquarters for WPA projects in Arizona during the latter Great Depression years.
- The Hacienda de Mexico — a 12,546 sq. ft. covered mall (located between the Wesley Bolin Building and the Home Arts Center).
- The Home Arts Center — a 13,584 sq. ft. building.
- The Agriculture Center — two building totaling 61,000 sq. ft. designed to accommodate large shows and exhibits, including livestock
- Wesley Bolin Building — an almost 20,000 sq. ft. exhibit space
- Arizona Plaza — a 17,184 sq. ft. adobe style complex.
- Exhibit Building — a 50,000 sq. ft. building used for large shows and commercial exhibits.

== WPA Administration Building ==
The WPA Administration Building was completed in 1939 in the PWA Moderne style. More recently it had been allowed to deteriorate, and was scheduled to be demolished in July 2014. This move was protested by historic preservationists. They were given a temporary restraining order by the Maricopa County Superior Court in 2014 and given until April 14, 2016, to raise $120,000 towards preservation of the building. They succeeded, on 8 April 2016 the project was awarded a historic preservation grant of $120,000 by the Phoenix City Council and a $80,000 grant by the Phoenix IDA.

== Gallery ==
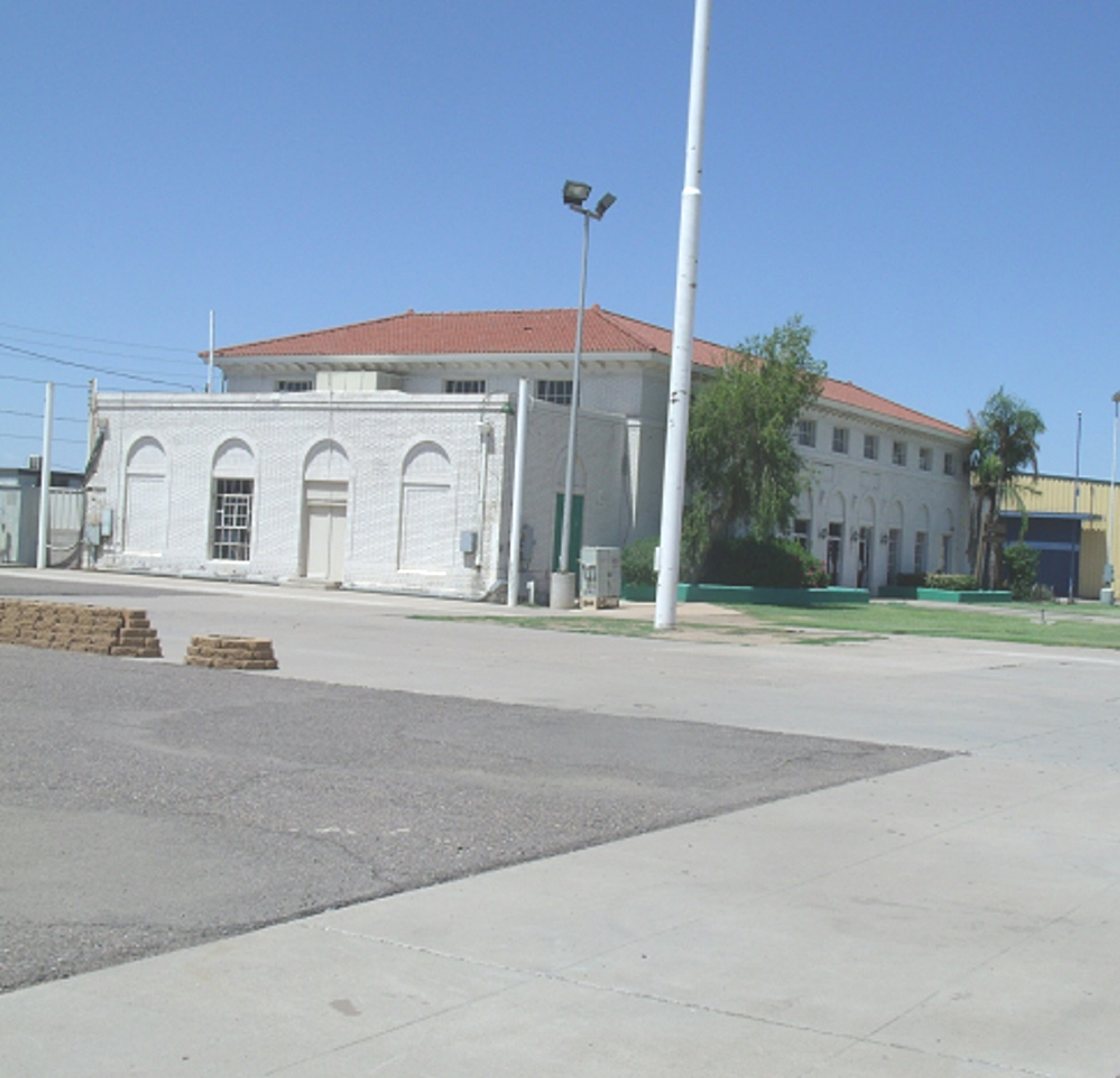
This historic building was first known as the Gem and Mineral Building.

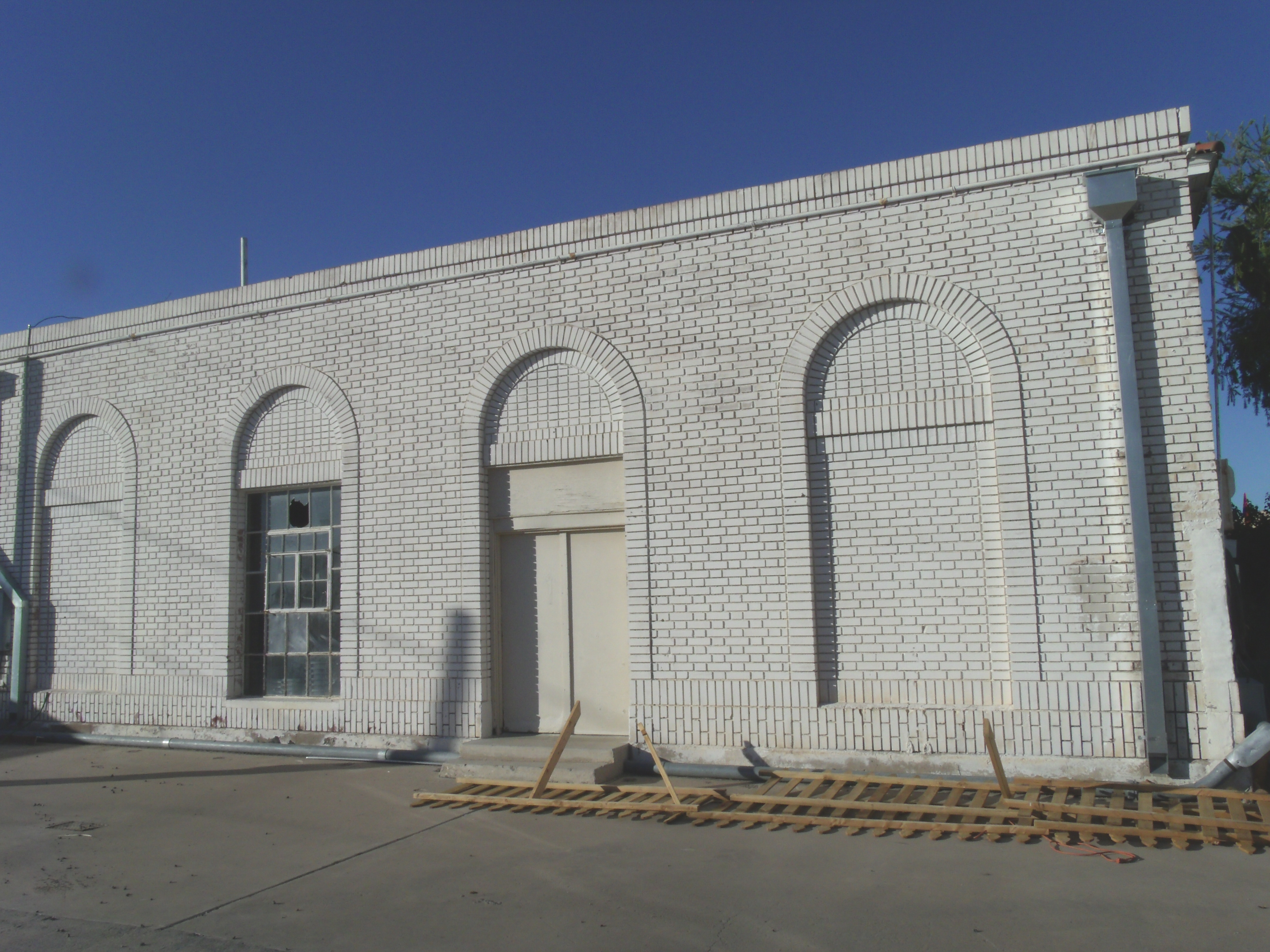
The side wall of the Gem and Mineral Building

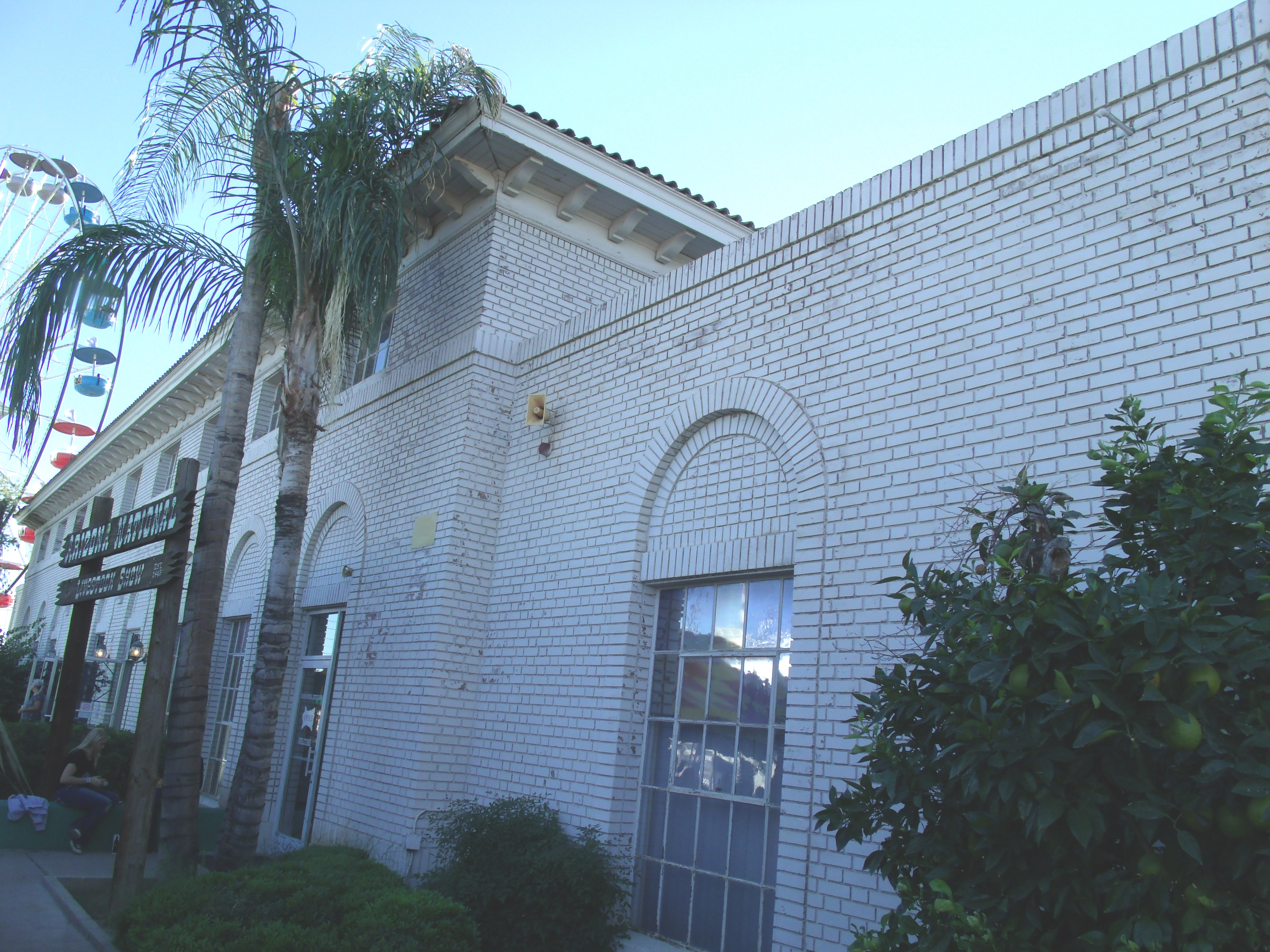
Close up view of the Gem and Mineral Building

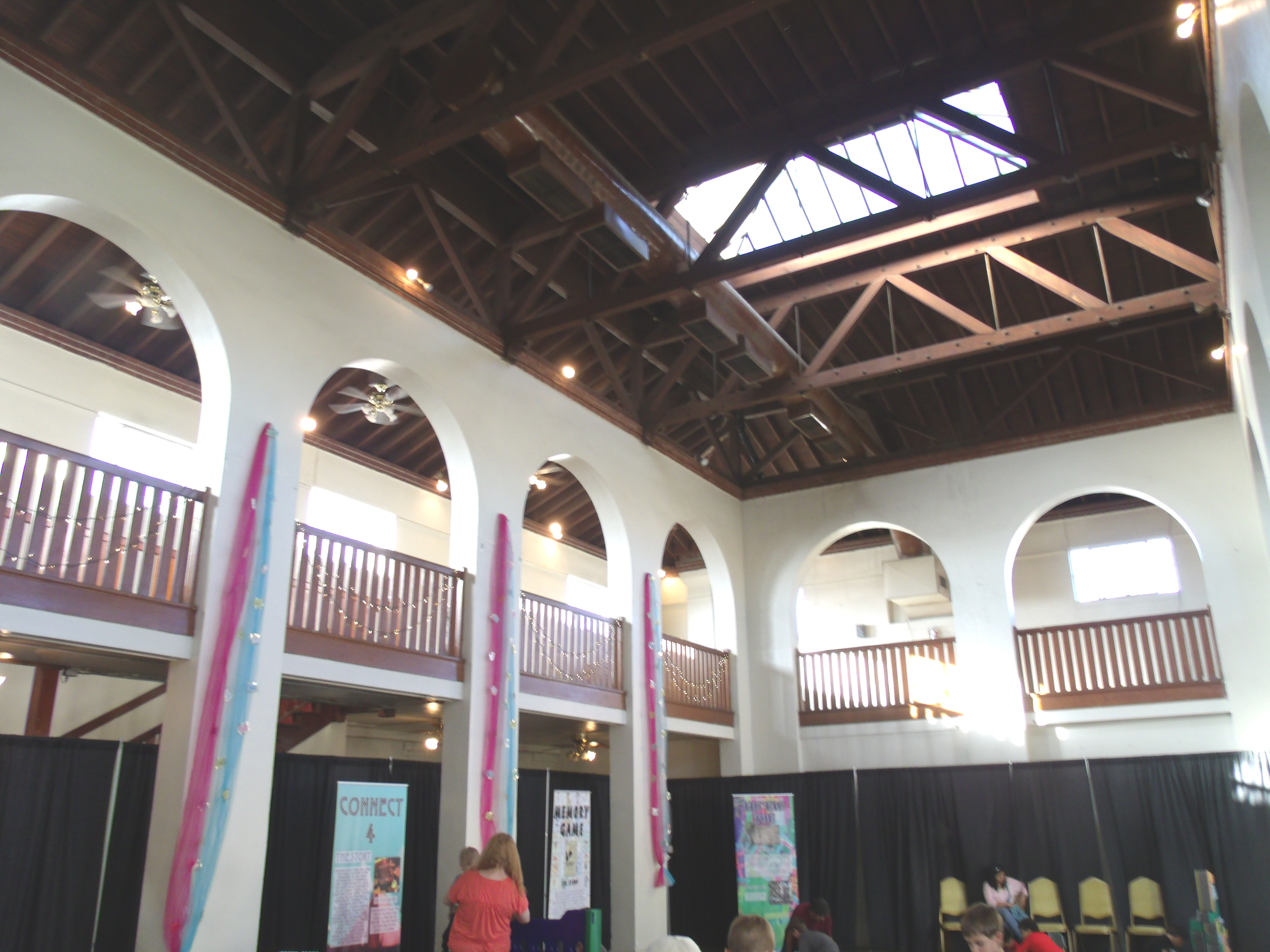
Inside the Gem and Mineral Building

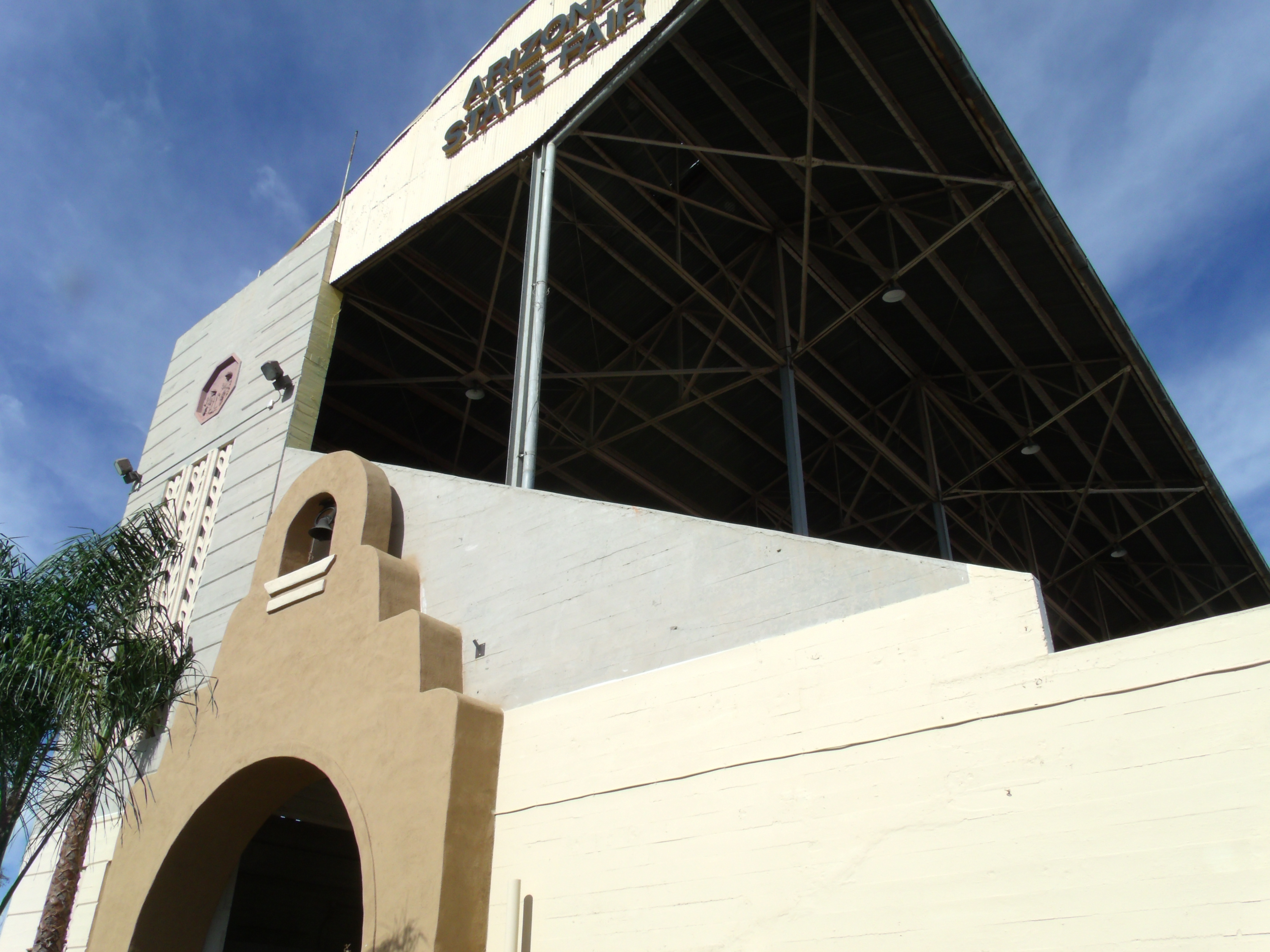
The historic Arizona State Fair Grandstand

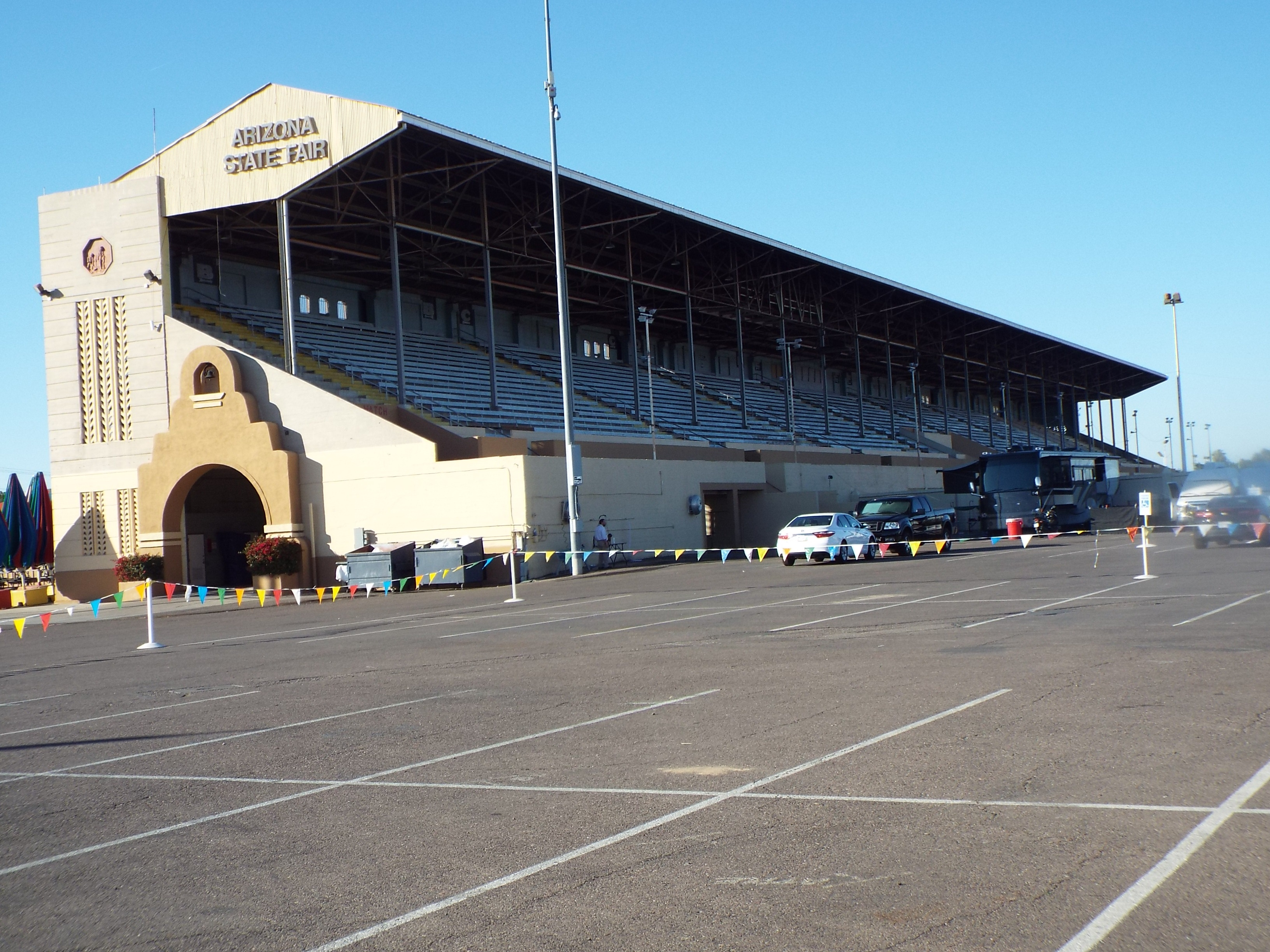
Different view of the historic Arizona State Fair Grandstand

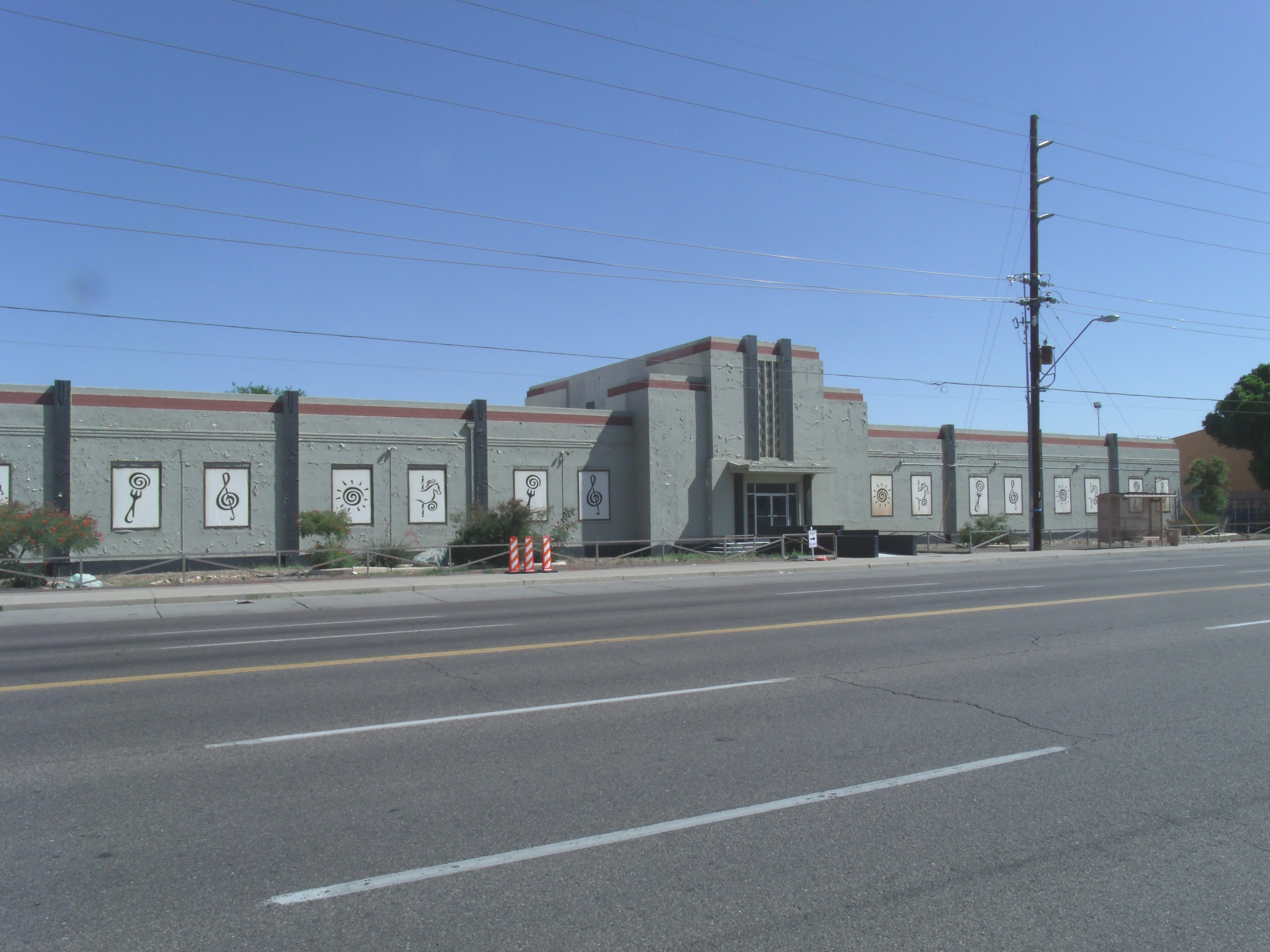
The Arizona State Fair WPA Civic Building

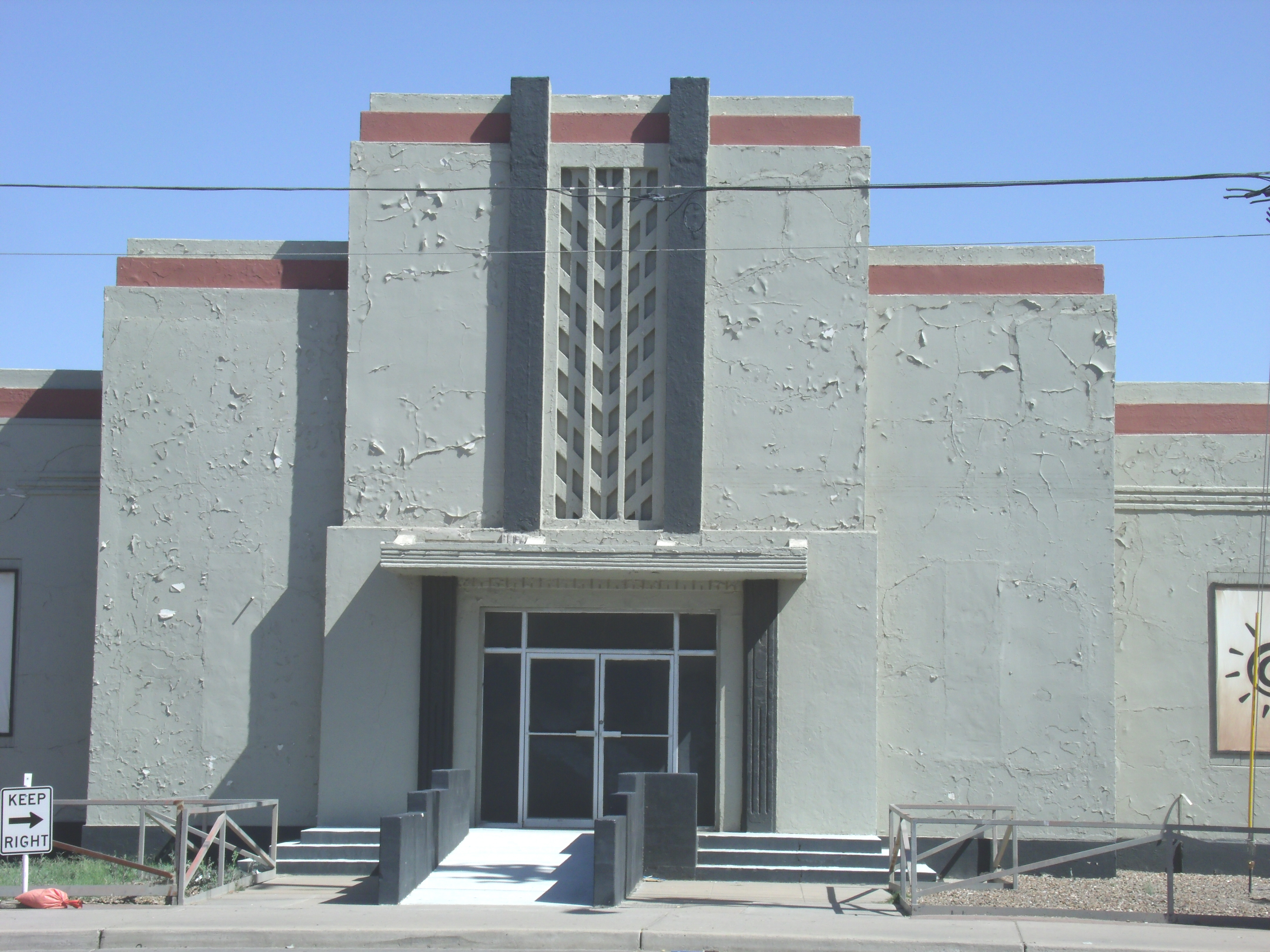
The front entrance of the Arizona State Fair WPA Civic Building

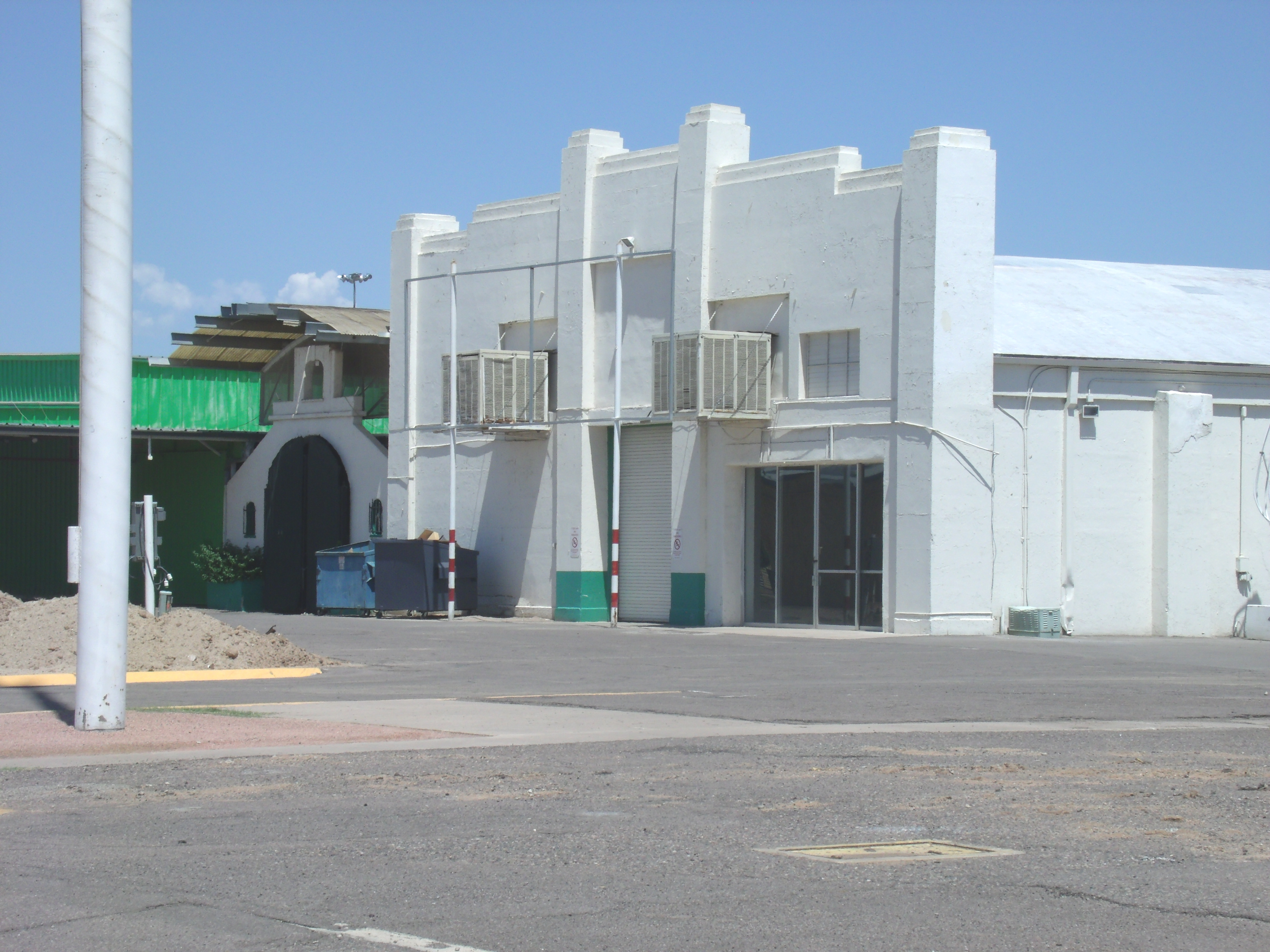
The Arizona State Fair Home Economics Building was built in 1940

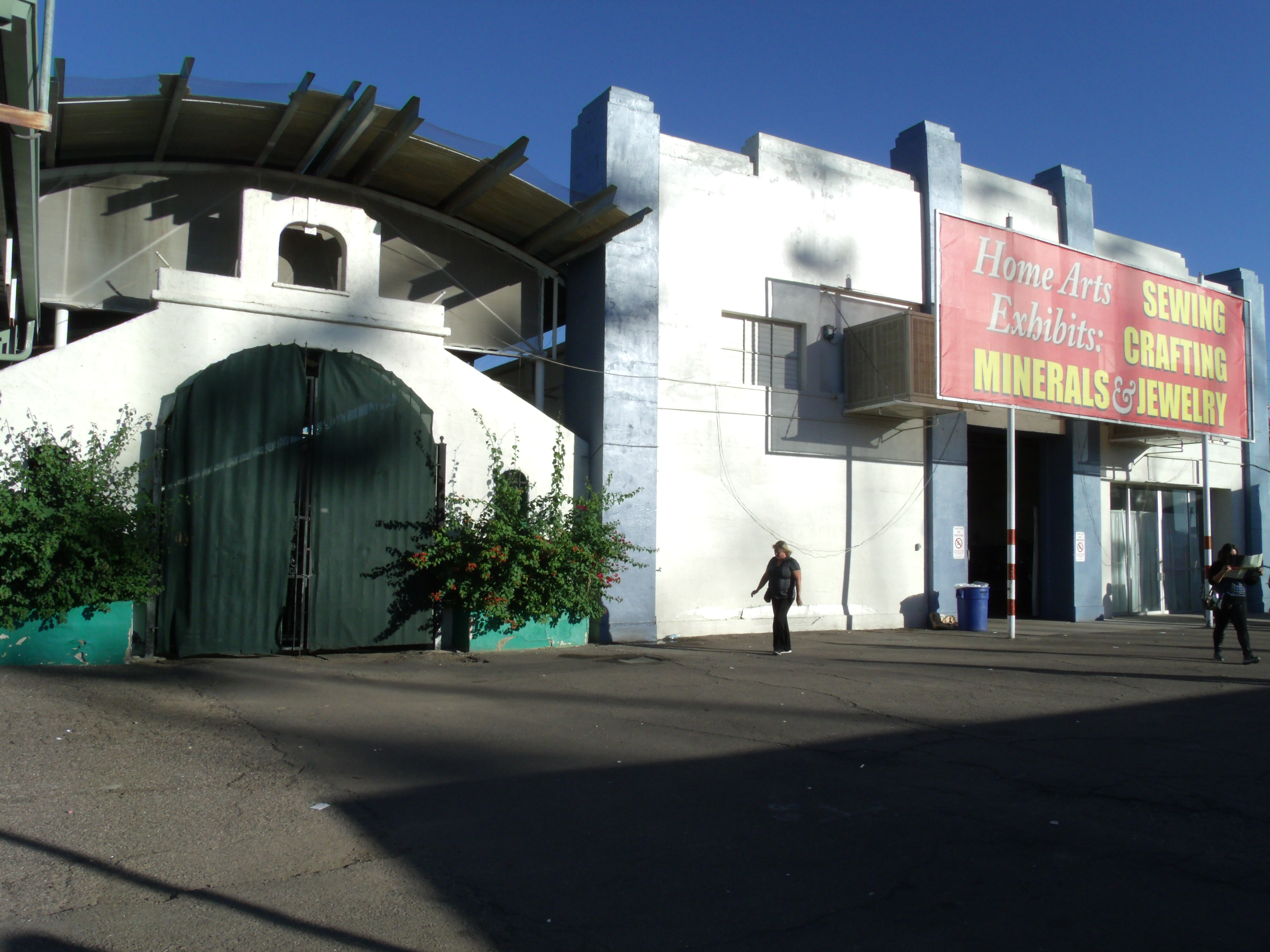
Close up view of the Arizona State Fair Home Economics.
