= Clinton Campbell =

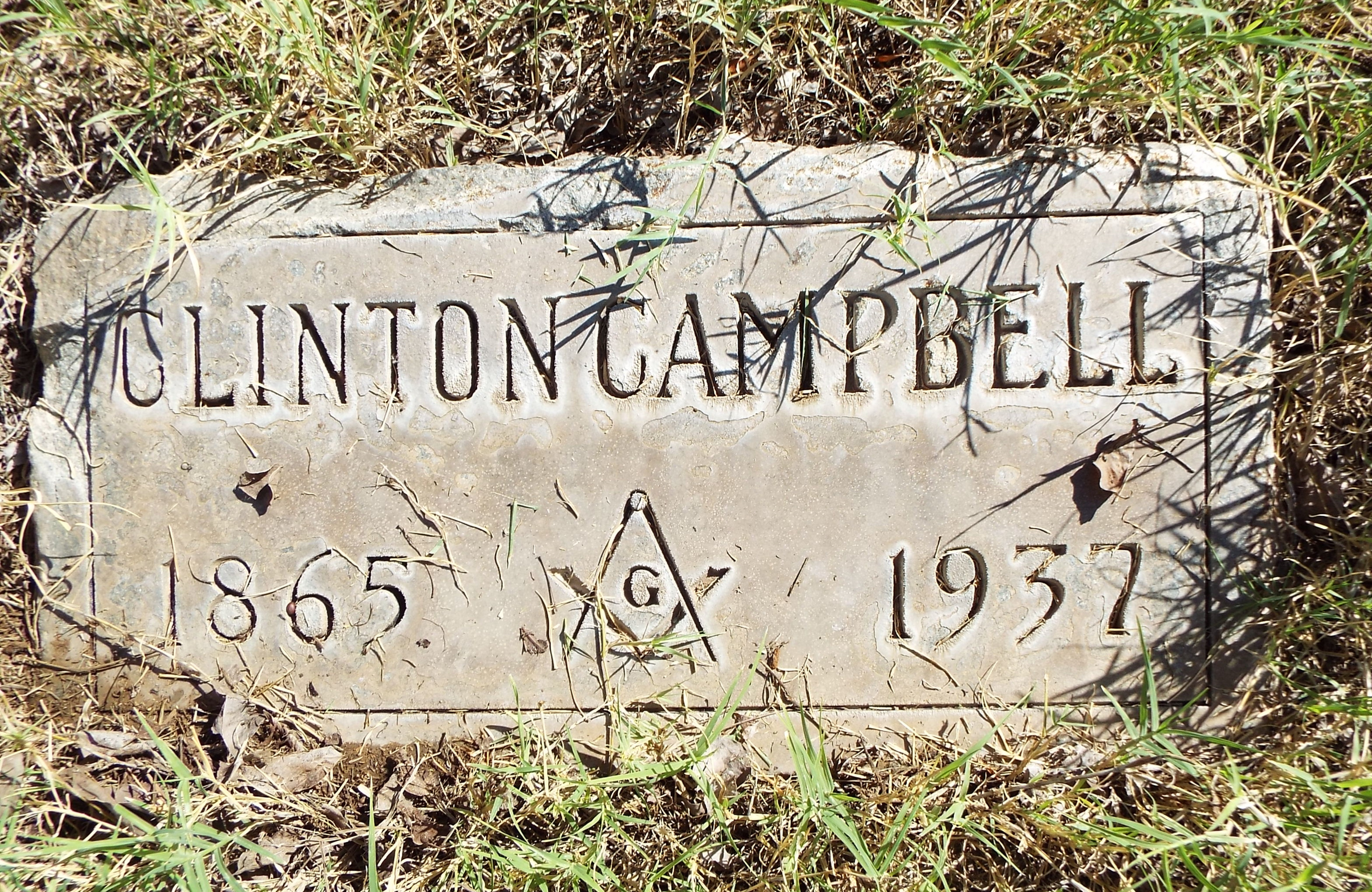
The grave of Clinton Campbell

Clinton Campbell (1865–1937) was a "locally prominent builder" who worked in Phoenix, Arizona. Several of his works both survive and are listed on the U.S. National Register of Historic Places. Campbell died in 1937 and was buried in Phoenix's Greenwood/Memory Lawn Mortuary & Cemetery.

Works include:

- Clinton Campbell House, 361 N. 4th Ave., Phoenix, Arizona
- El Zaribah Shrine Auditorium, 1502 W. Washington St., Phoenix, Arizona
- Firestone, 302 W. Van Buren, Phoenix, Arizona
- ASU President's House, ASU campus, Tempe, Arizona, built in 1907 in "Western Colonial" style
- Bear Down Gym, NRHP-listed, at University of Arizona, built 1926, designed by Lyman & Place/Roy Place, architect, built by Clinton Campbell
- A.E. England Motors, Inc./Electrical Equipment Co. building, built in 1926, Spanish Renaissance Revival

== Gallery ==
Historic structures built by Clinton Campbell
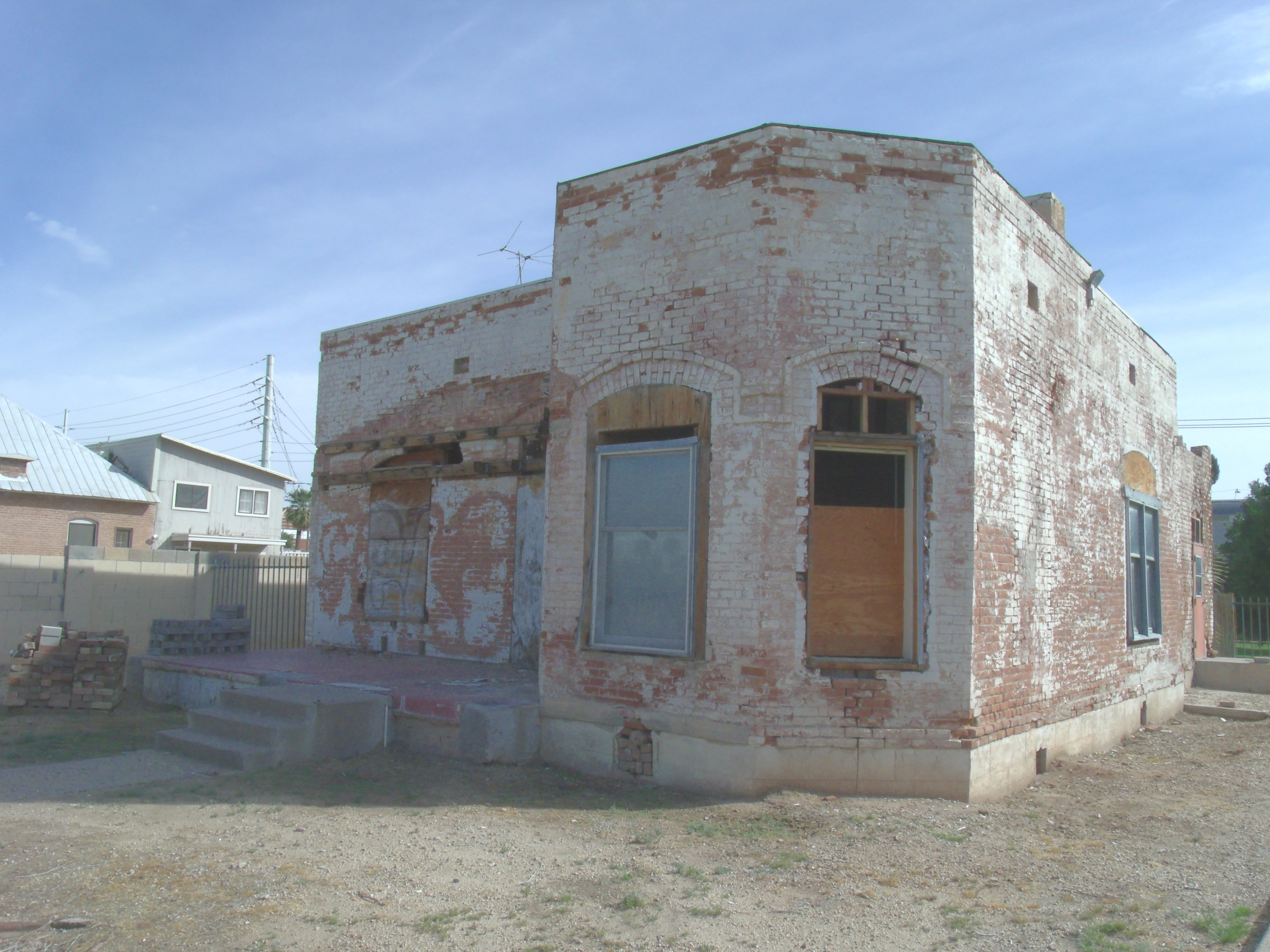
The Clinton Campbell House was located at 361 N. 4th Ave. It was demolished in 2017.

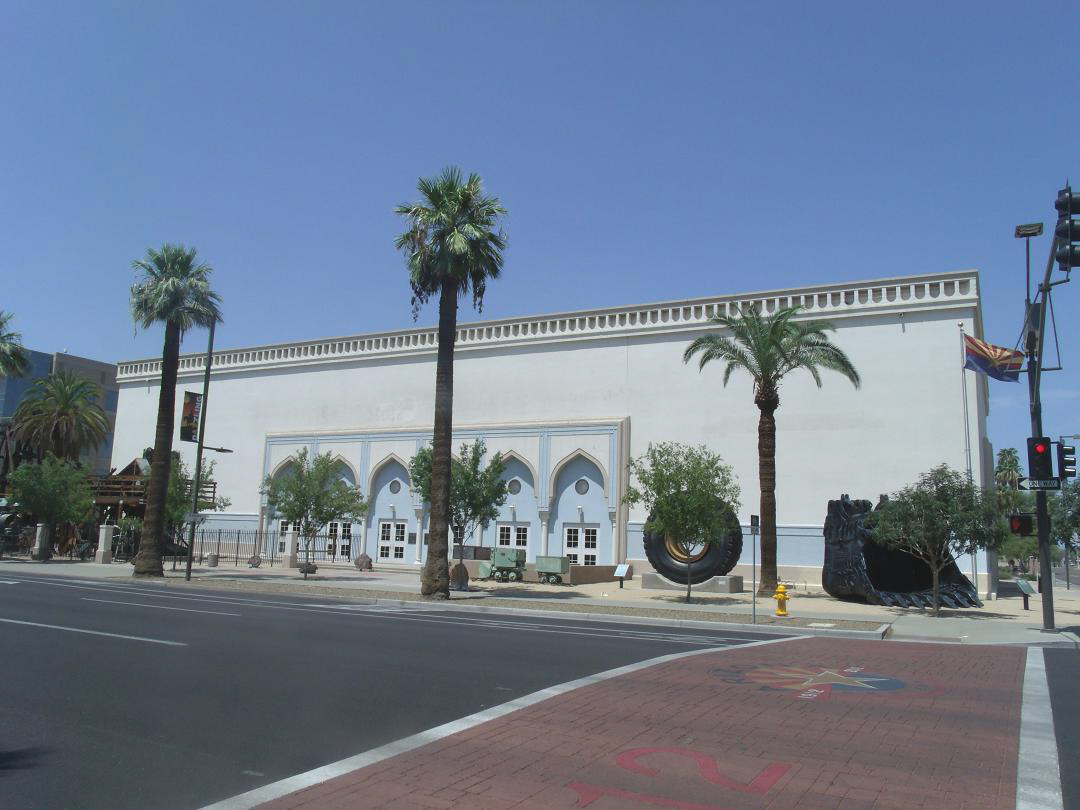
El Zaribah Shrine Auditorium (now the Polly Rosenbaum Building) located at 1502 W. Washington St.

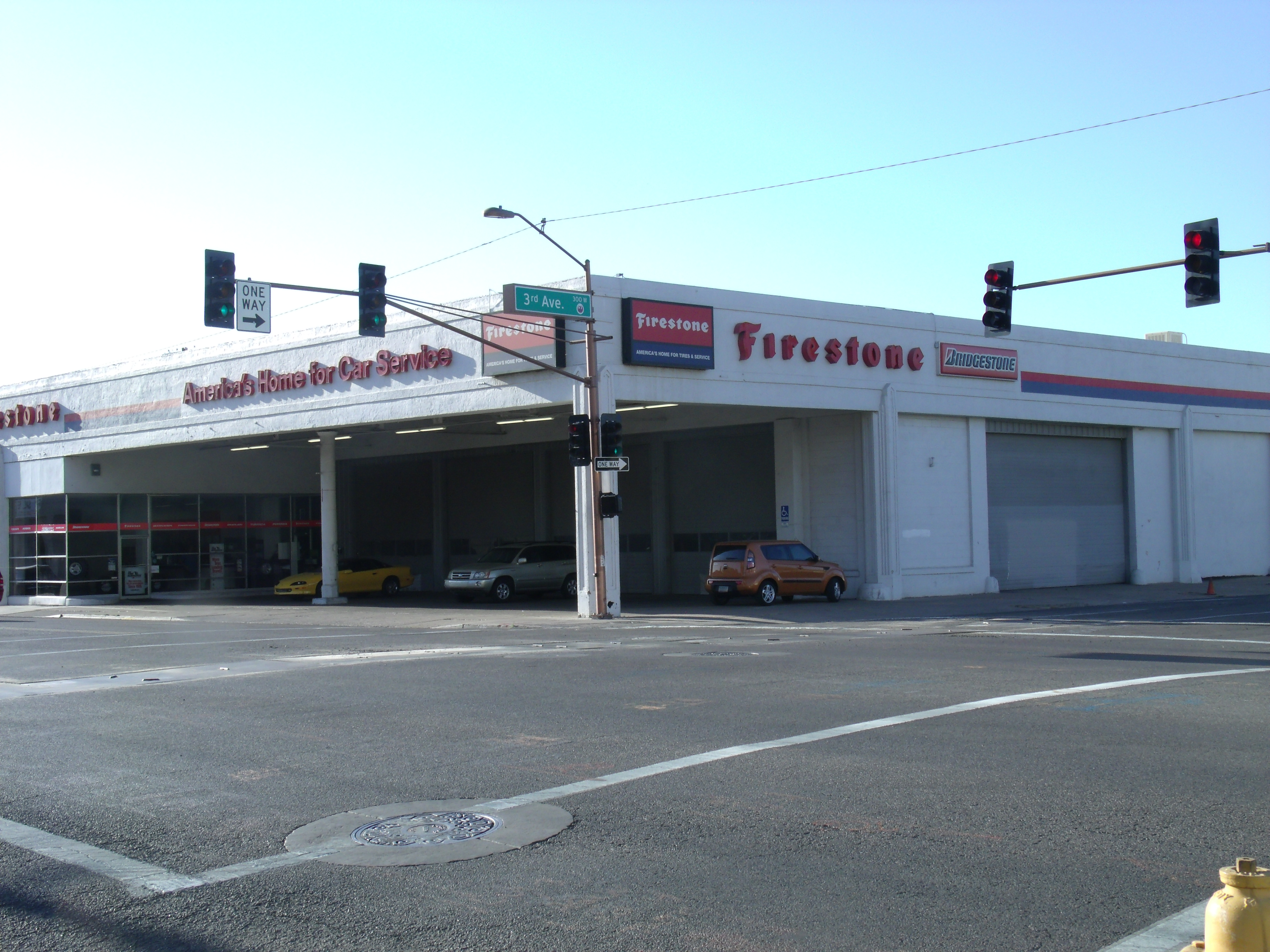
Firestone building located at 302 W. Van Buren St.

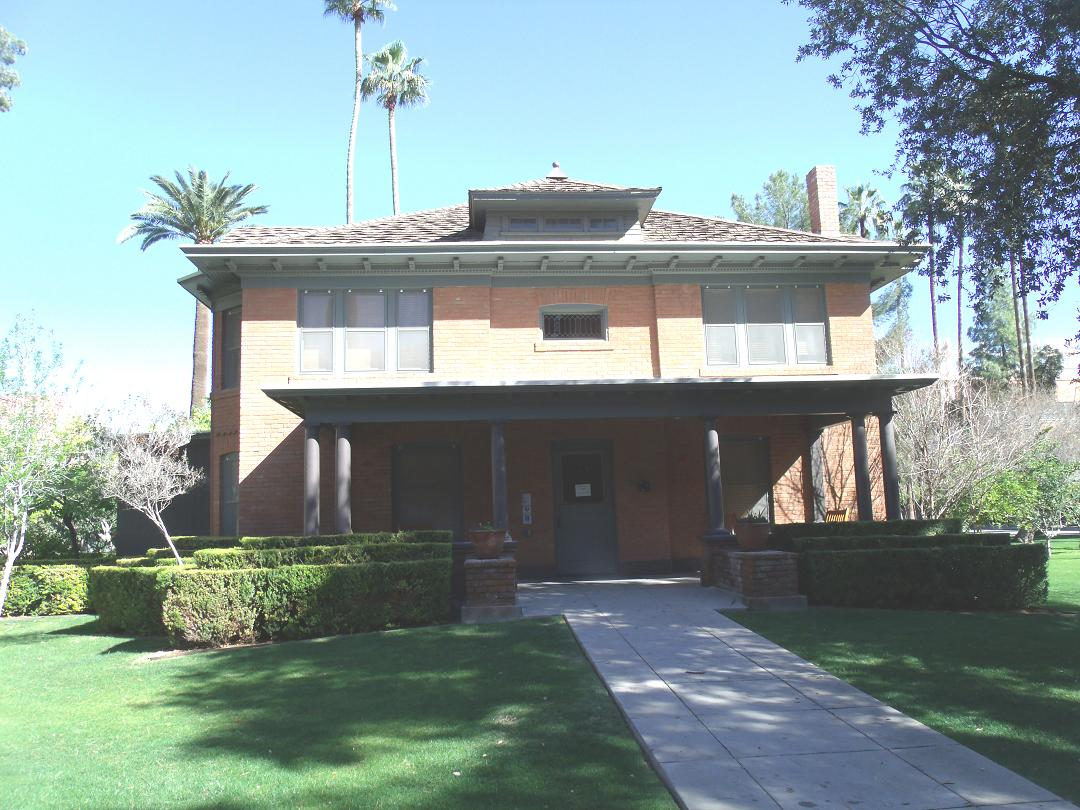
President's House, also known as University Archives located at the ASU campus, Tempe, Arizona

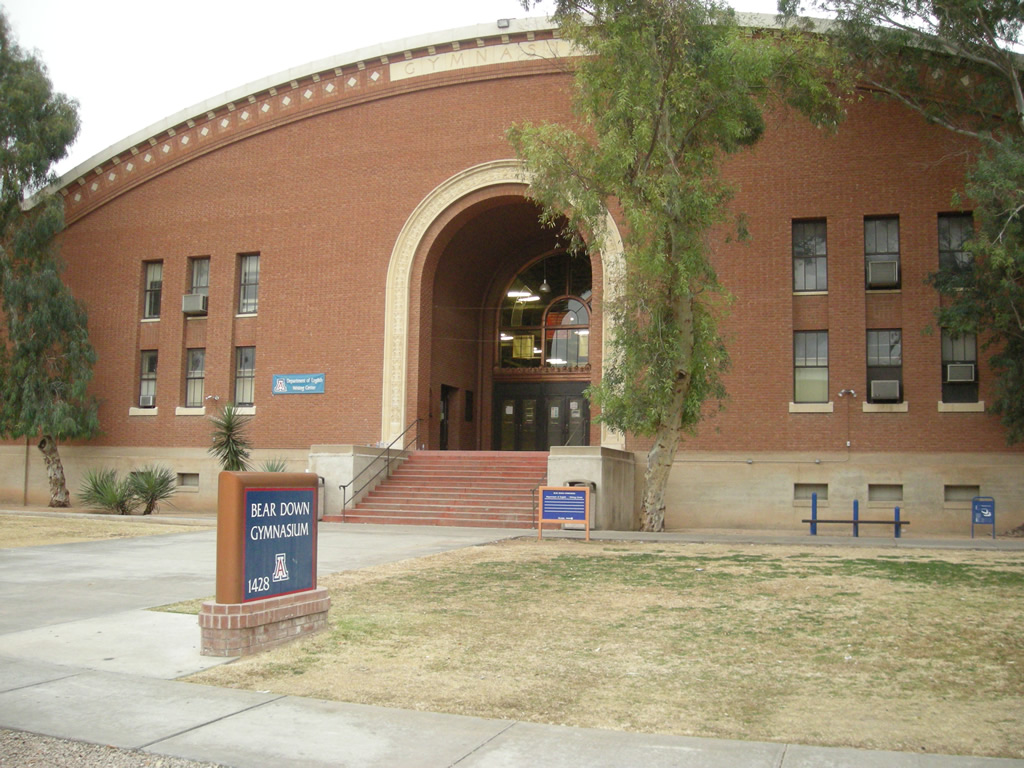
Bear Down Gym

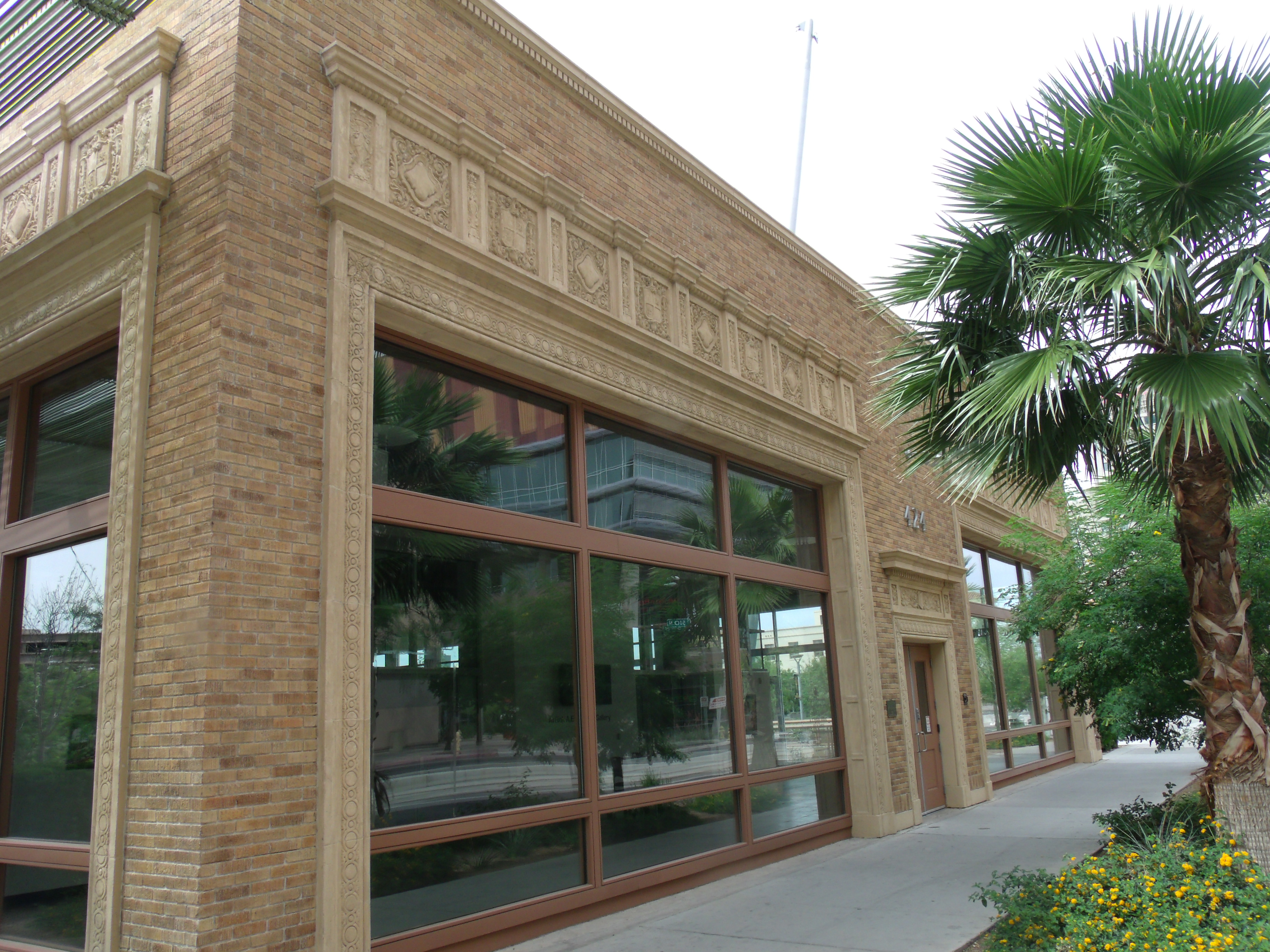
A.E. England Motors Building located at 424 N. Central Ave.

== See also ==
- Michael Sullivan (stonemason)
