= McKale Center =

University of Arizona athletic arena in Tucson

McKale Center at ALKEME Arena
- Lute & Bobbi Olson Court
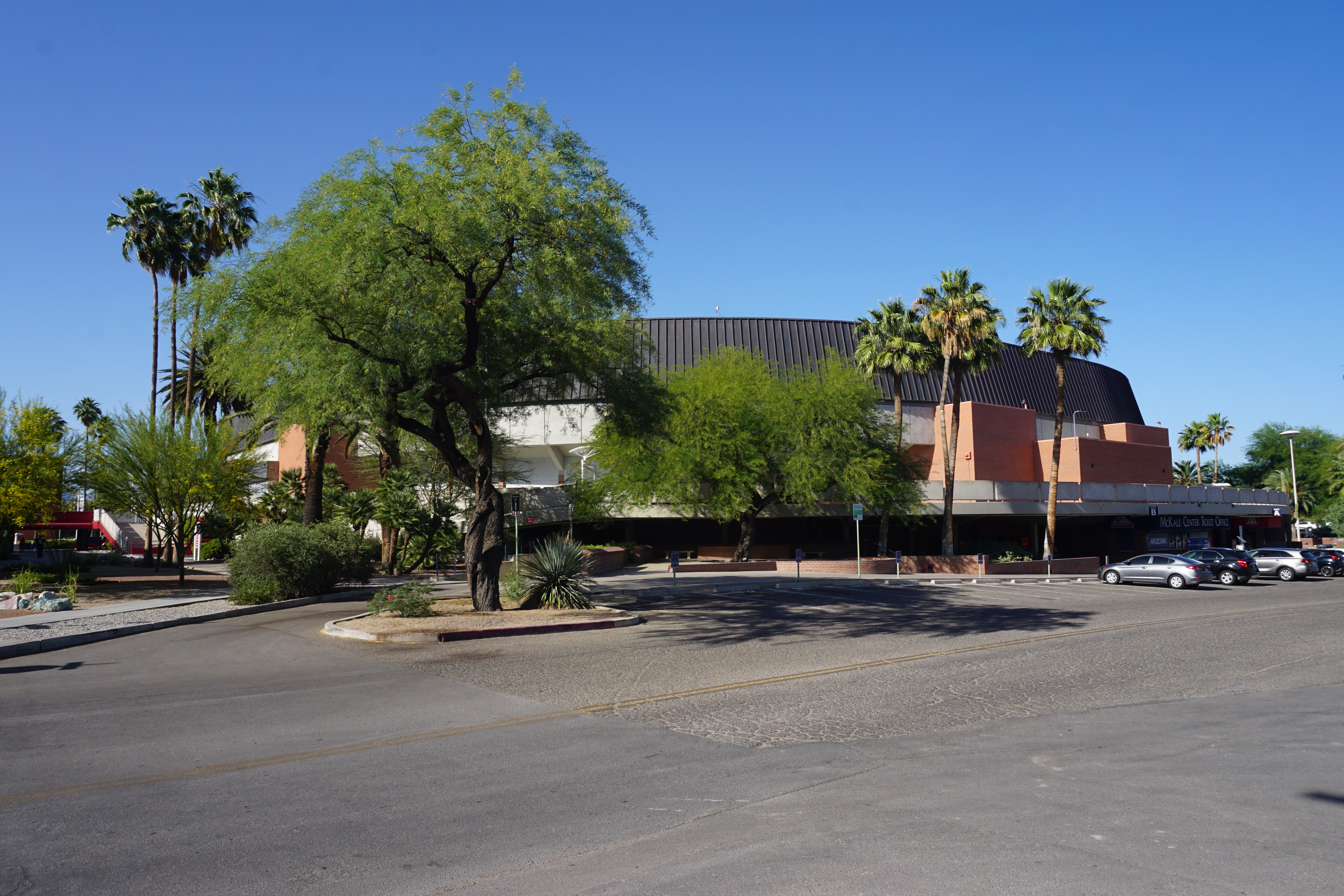
- View from southwest in 2019

- Location in Arizona Location in the United States
- Full name: McKale Center at ALKEME Arena
- Location: 1 National Championship Dr. Tucson, Arizona, U.S.
- Coordinates: 32.23°N 110.95°W
- Owner: University of Arizona
- Operator: University of Arizona
- Capacity: 14,688 (2015–present)

Construction
- Groundbreaking: November 1970
- Opened: February 1, 1973; 53 years ago
- Cost: $8,145,077 ($59.1 million in 2025)
- Architects: Place and Place, Inc.
- General contractors: Sundt Construction, Inc.

Tenant
- Arizona Wildcats (NCAA) (1973–present)

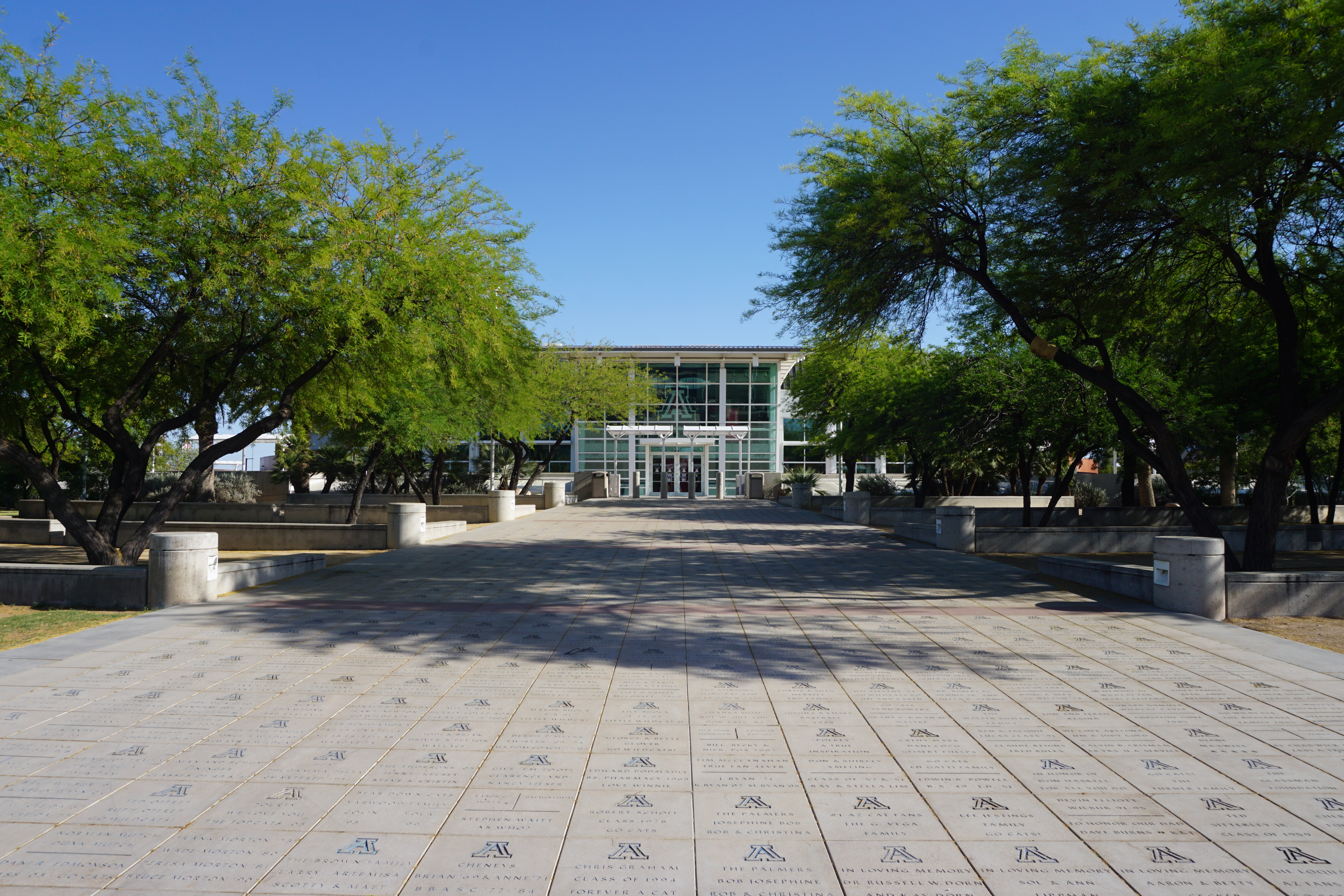
McKale Center, from the north

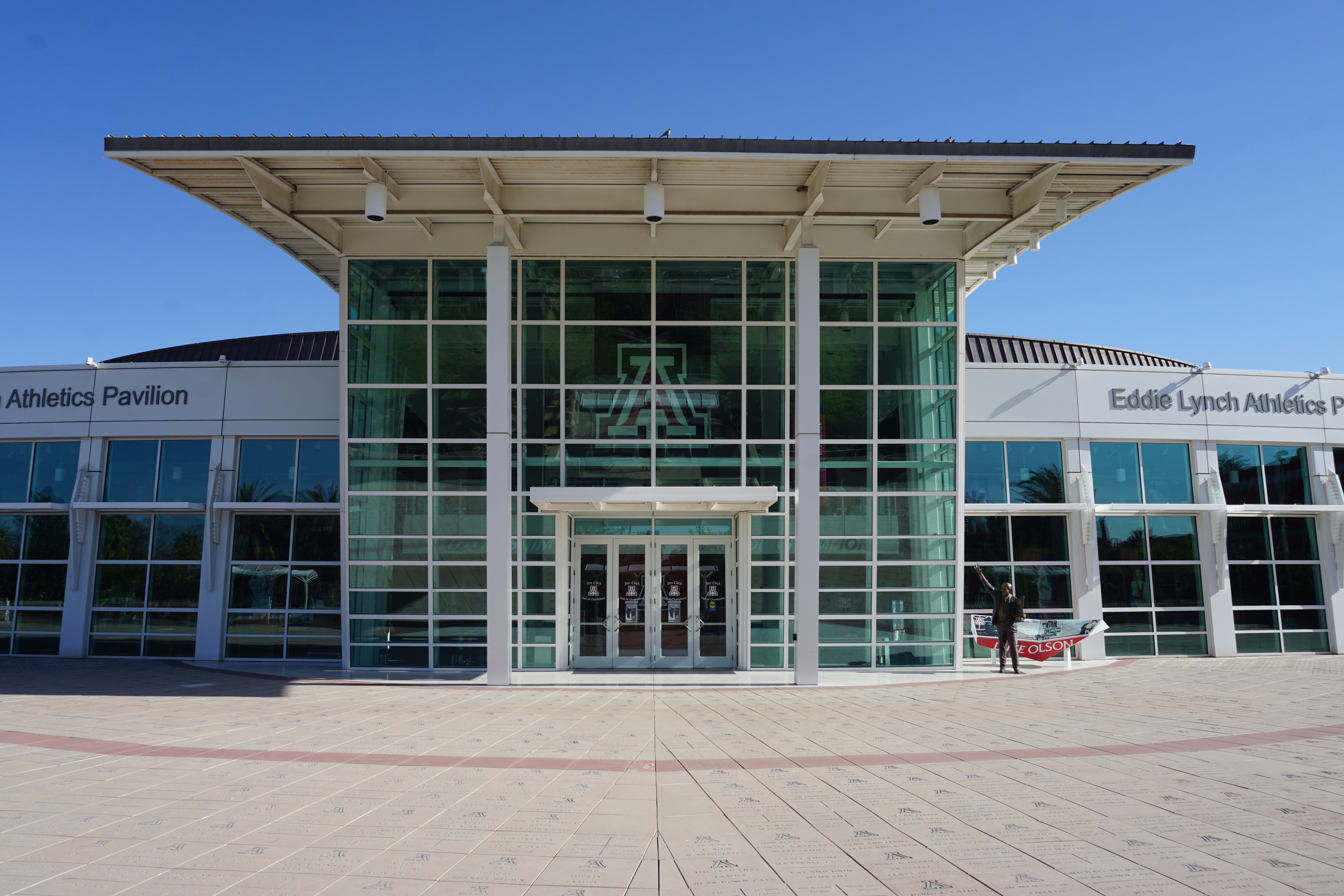
Entrance to the Eddie Lynch Athletics Pavilion

McKale Center at ALKEME Arena is an athletic arena in the southwest United States, located on the campus of the University of Arizona in Tucson, Arizona. As the home of the university's Wildcats basketball team of the Big 12 Conference, it is primarily used for basketball, but also has physical training and therapy facilities. Its construction is marked with a large copper cap that has oxidized brown.

== History ==
In the 1960s, it was recognized that the Wildcats' basketball venue, Bear Down Gymnasium, was outdated and in need of replacement. Major planning for the new facility began in 1966. During construction, the Wildcats briefly considered playing some of its 1971–72 home schedule in the then-newly completed 8,000-seat arena at the Tucson Convention Center, but eventually declined, remaining in Bear Down Gym until the new venue was ready. The new arena officially opened in February 1973 and has an official capacity of 14,688 spectators. The elevation at street level is approximately 2,450 feet (750 m) above sea level.

The McKale Center was named in honor of J.F. "Pop" McKale, a major athletic figure at U of A from 1914 to 1957. At one time, he was head coach of all of the school's athletic teams. He was head basketball coach from 1914 to 1921, where he achieved a 49–12 (.803) record. He led the football team from 1914 to 1930, with an 80–32–6 (.703) record. It was McKale's first team that resulted in Arizona's teams being nicknamed "Wildcats." In 1914, Arizona's name meant very little in the college football world. Although they lost to Occidental College in Los Angeles 14–0, a reporter for the Los Angeles Times was so impressed with Arizona's effort that he wrote, "The Arizona men showed the fight of wild cats ..." Soon afterward, Arizona's student-athletes were nicknamed the Wildcats.

Following a win over rival Arizona State on February 26, 2000, the university athletic department honored longtime head coach Lute Olson with a ceremony to name the McKale Center playing surface "Lute Olson Court." Less than a year later, during a memorial service in January 2001 for Olson's wife, Bobbi, it was renamed, "Lute and Bobbi Olson Court" in recognition of the couple's impact on the university and the city of Tucson.

In 2002, the Eddie Lynch Athletics Pavilion, a state-of-the-art medical and strength/conditioning facility for Wildcat student athletes, was completed and opened. The pavilion (which cost $14 million) was a 36,000-square-foot (3,300 m^{2}) addition to the north end of McKale Center. The upper level has a 10,000-square-foot (930 m^{2}) museum-like display area, open to the public, showcasing the history of Arizona Wildcat athletics.

The university's spring and winter commencement ceremonies were held at McKale Center from 1973 until 2012; the 2013 ceremonies returned to Arizona Stadium after an absence of thirty years.

On February 13, 2026, the venue was renamed McKale Center at Alkeme Arena after Alkeme Insurance bought the naming rights to the venue for 15 years totalling $27.7 million.

== Proposed renovation ==
In December 2012, the university athletic department was given approval by the Arizona Board of Regents to select an architect to renovate the arena. "The hope is to get it to be where it's one concourse enclosed that you can walk around and have the restrooms and concessions and everything tied to it," said athletic director Greg Byrne. The renovation would also include a club area, luxury seating, and more room for the athletics offices that occupy the McKale Center.

The Arizona Athletic Department ultimately decided on AECOM to plan and design the renovation. The project will be completed in several phases from 2014 to 2017 at a cost of $80 million. McKale Center will remain open during the construction process, with a majority of the work done outside of basketball season. The first phase of the renovation includes a brand new HD video scoreboard which was completed at the end of December 2013. Other parts of the first phase also included new seating, a new floor, an improved locker room area and expanded restrooms and concessions. The first phase was completed in November 2014.

== McKale Center records ==
- First Game: Feb. 1, 1973; Arizona 87, Wyoming 69
- UA Record in Facility: 695–123 (.850)+
- Cumulative Attendance: 10,164,318 in 50 seasons (2020-21 not included in total att.)
- Undefeated Seasons: 13 (1976, ‘77, ‘86, ‘88, ‘89, ‘90, ‘91, ‘98, ‘99, ‘11, ‘14, ‘15, '22)
- Longest Home Court Win Streak: 71, Feb. 14, 1987–Jan. 11, 1992
- Most Points Scored, Arizona: 127, Arizona vs Arizona State, Jan. 15, 1998
- Most Points Scored, Opponent: 110, Arizona State vs. Arizona, Feb. 17, 1973
- Biggest Winning Margin, Arizona: 64, Arizona (118) vs. Robert Morris (54), Dec. 28, 1996
- Biggest Winning Margin, Opponent: 30, BYU (99) vs. Arizona (69), Dec. 28, 2009
- Most Points Scored, Arizona Individual: 41, Al Fleming, vs. Detroit, Jan. 10, 1976
- Most Points Scored, Opponent: 49, Jimmer Fredette, BYU vs. Arizona, Dec. 28, 2009

+ record includes 35 vacated victories during 2007–08, 2016–17 & 2017–18 season due to NCAA infractions

== Major events ==
- Host of the 1988 Pac-12 Conference men's basketball tournament.
- On January 12, 2011, the McKale Center hosted a memorial service for the 2011 Tucson shooting victims in which President Barack Obama was the keynote speaker.
- On September 12, 2021, the Athletic Department held a memorial service for Lute Olson.
- The arena has been a frequent site for games in the NCAA Division I men's basketball tournament since its opening. McKale Center hosted the first and second rounds of the tournament in 1979, 1987, 1989, 1991, 1993, 1997, 2000 and 2005; the second and third rounds in 2011; and the West Regional semifinals and final in 1974 and 1980.

== Inside McKale Center ==
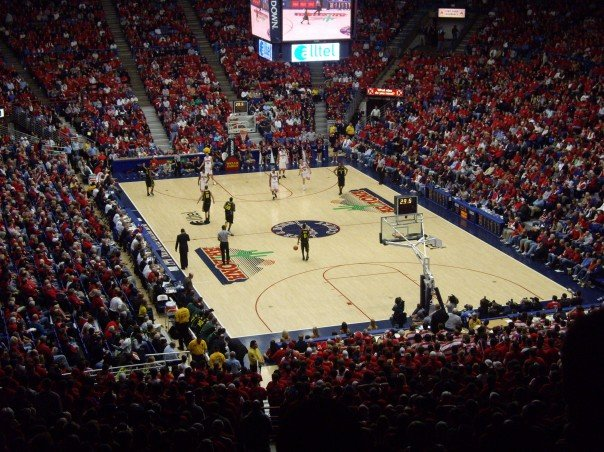
Upper Deck

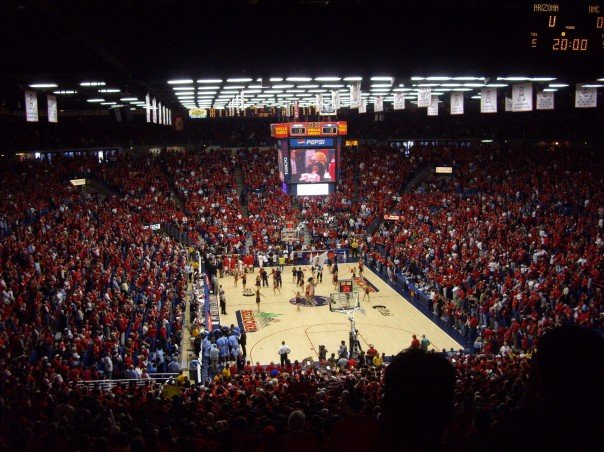
Upper Student Section

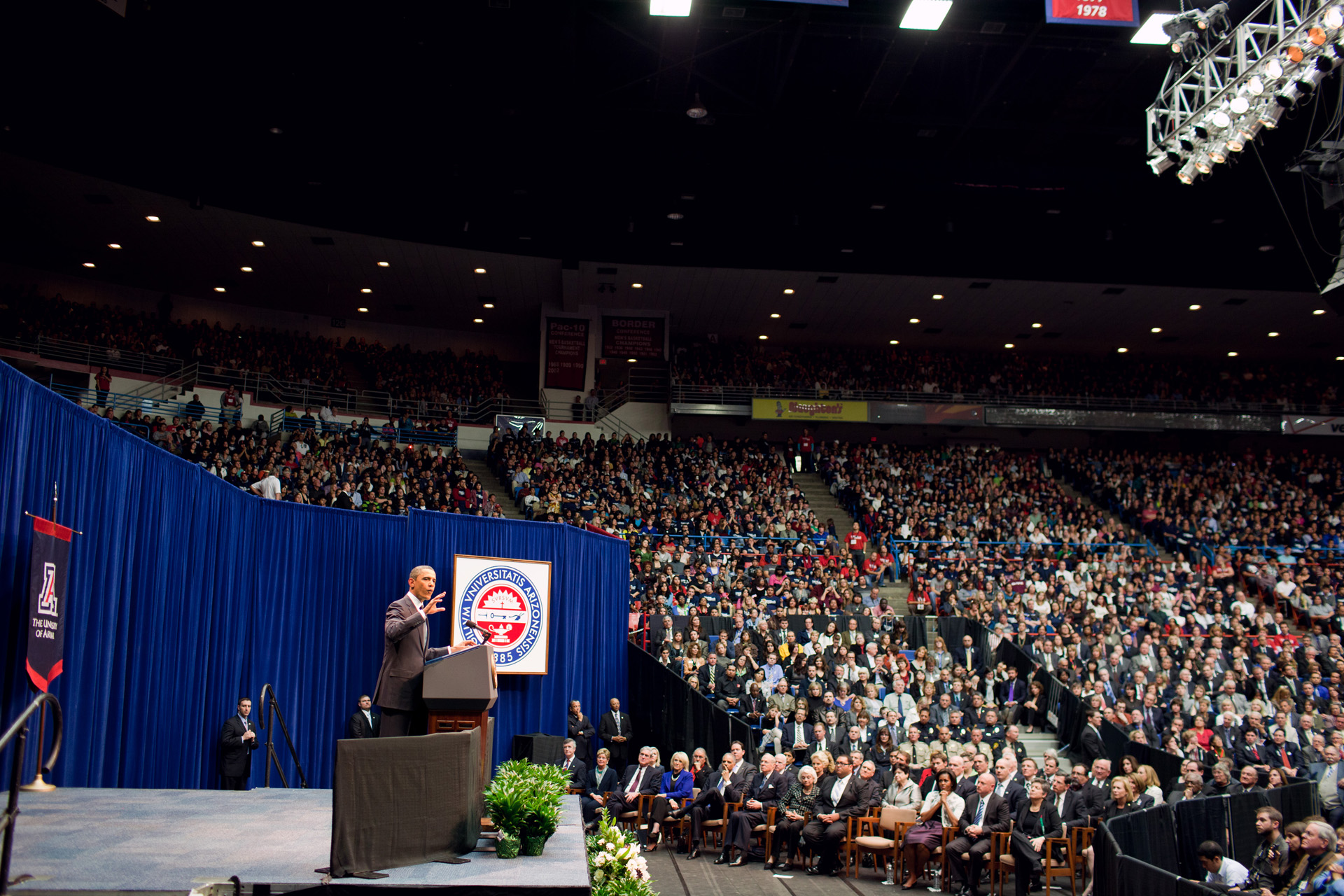
President Barack Obama speaks in honor of the victims of the 2011 Tucson shooting

== See also ==
- List of NCAA Division I basketball arenas
