= Arizona Geological Survey =

State agency

- Founded: 1883
- Founder: Arizona legislature
- Type: state agency
- Purpose: investigate and describe Arizona's geology and to educate and inform the public regarding its geologic setting
- Website: azgs.arizona.edu

The Arizona Geological Survey (AZGS) was established by the Arizona Legislature to investigate and describe Arizona's geology and to educate and inform the public regarding its geologic setting. Each year since 1915, AZGS has released geologic maps, formal reports, and other geology-related publications. In Tucson, the Survey maintains a geological library comprising more than 15,000 volumes and approximately 100 linear feet of mine files that include newspaper clippings, maps, mine schematics and mine reports; it also maintains a small core repository of donated rock core. In addition, AZGS archives well cuttings of more than 1,000 oil and gas wells on behalf of the Arizona Oil and Gas Conservation Commission. The AZGS Phoenix branch maintains tens-of-thousands of mine maps and reports acquired in 2011 when the Arizona Department of Mines and Mineral Resources merged with AZGS. The Survey main office is located at 1955 East 6th Street, P.O. Box 210184, Tucson, AZ 85721.

== History ==
The Arizona Geological Survey is the latest in a line of academic departments and state agencies serving the people of the Arizona Territory and now the State of Arizona. In 1883, then Territorial Governor Tritle, requested federal assistance in establishing a geologic survey for the Arizona Territory. The U.S. Congress responded in 1888 by creating the post of Territorial Geologist of Arizona. The unpaid position of Territorial Geologist first went to John F. Blandy, who served until the mid-1890s. Upon gaining statehood in 1912, the position of Territorial Geologist was abolished.

From 1893 until 1915, the role of geologic mapping and reporting was handed off to the University of Arizona Bureau of Mines. In 1915, the Arizona Bureau of Mines was established at the University of Arizona with Charles Willis as its first director.

World War II was a fertile time for the Arizona Bureau of Mines. The hunt for strategic metals from large volume, low-grade deposits involved Bureau geologists in research and design of ore concentrating facilities at five major low-grade copper deposits. Following World War II, renewed emphasis on geologic mapping led to the publication of county geologic maps between 1957 and 1960.

Territorial and State Geologic Agencies of Arizona from 1888–2007

- 2016–Present: Arizona Geological Survey – Univ. of Arizona
- 1988–2006: Arizona Geological Survey – State of Arizona
- 1977–1988: Arizona Bureau of Geology and Mineral Technology
- 1915–1977: Arizona Bureau of Mines
- 1893–1915: The University of Arizona Bureau of Mines
- 1888–1890, 1898–1912: Office of the Territorial Geologist

The 2017 annual budget for the AZGS is $941,000.
