= Bear Down Gym =

Historic multi-purpose arena in Tucson, Arizona

- Bear Down Gym
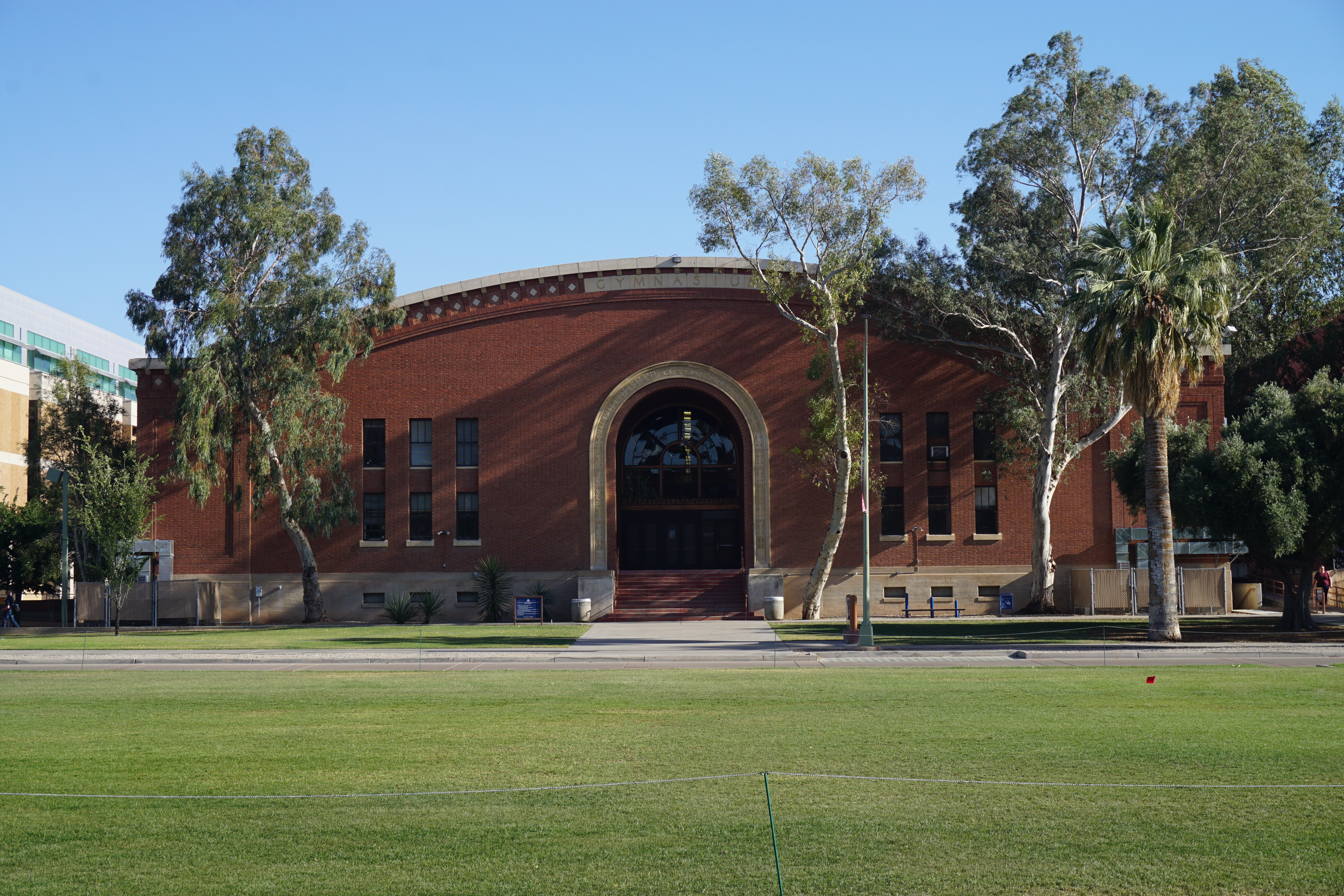
- Bear Down Gymnasium
- Interactive map of Bear Down Gym
- Full name: Bear Down Gymnasium
- Location: Tucson, Arizona
- Owner: University of Arizona
- Operator: University of Arizona
- Capacity: 6,000 (peak)

Construction
- Groundbreaking: 1925
- Opened: 1926
- Cost: US$130,000
- Architect: Lyman & Place/Roy Place
- General contractor: Clinton Campbell

Tenant
- Arizona Wildcats men's basketball (1926–1973)
- Men's Gymnasium, University of Arizona
- U.S. National Register of Historic Places
- Location within Arizona Location within the United States
- Location: University of Arizona campus Tucson, Arizona
- Coordinates: 32°13′52″N 110°57′0″W
- Area: 0.3 acres (0.1 ha)
- Built: 1926
- NRHP reference No.: 90001526
- Added to NRHP: October 4, 1990

Bear Down Gym, originally known as Men's Gymnasium, is a 300-seat multi-purpose arena in Tucson, Arizona. It opened in 1926. It was home to the University of Arizona Wildcats basketball team. It was replaced when the McKale Center opened in 1973. It is listed on the National Register of Historic Places.

Bear Down Gym is also famous for its inclusion in the 1984 blockbuster film Revenge of the Nerds. It was the gymnasium of the fictional "Adams College" and also temporary home to the Nerds after they were kicked out of their original Freshmen home (Cochise Hall).

It was designed by Lyman & Place/Roy Place, architect, and was built by Clinton Campbell.

It was listed on the National Register of Historic Places as Men's Gymnasium, University of Arizona in 1990.

The building has been renovated and updated to accommodate the growing needs of University of Arizona students, including housing resources for students such as the Think Tank, where students are tutored. Plans are in the works to add a three-story building over the spot currently holding an old swimming pool.
