= Arizona Department of Mines and Mineral Resources =

State agency

The Arizona Department of Mines and Mineral Resources (ADMMR) is a state government agency in the U.S. state of Arizona that has the purpose of promoting and developing the state's mineral resources.

The department was established in 1939 as the Arizona Department of Mineral Resources.

The ADMMR engages in technical research, field investigations, education, and information dissemination. As one of its educational activities, it operated the Arizona Mining and Mineral Museum until July 2010, when responsibility for the museum was transferred to the Arizona Historical Society pursuant to a state law enacted in May 2010. The ADMMR has no regulatory functions. Regulation of mineral exploration and mining on Arizona's state trust land is under the jurisdiction of the Minerals Section of the Arizona State Land Department.

== See also ==
The Arizona Bureau of Mines, a separate agency formed in 1915, was a predecessor agency of the Arizona Geological Survey.
