= Arizona State Fair =

Annual state fair in Phoenix, Arizona, U.S.

Coordinates: 33°28′10.18″N 112°05′49.86″W

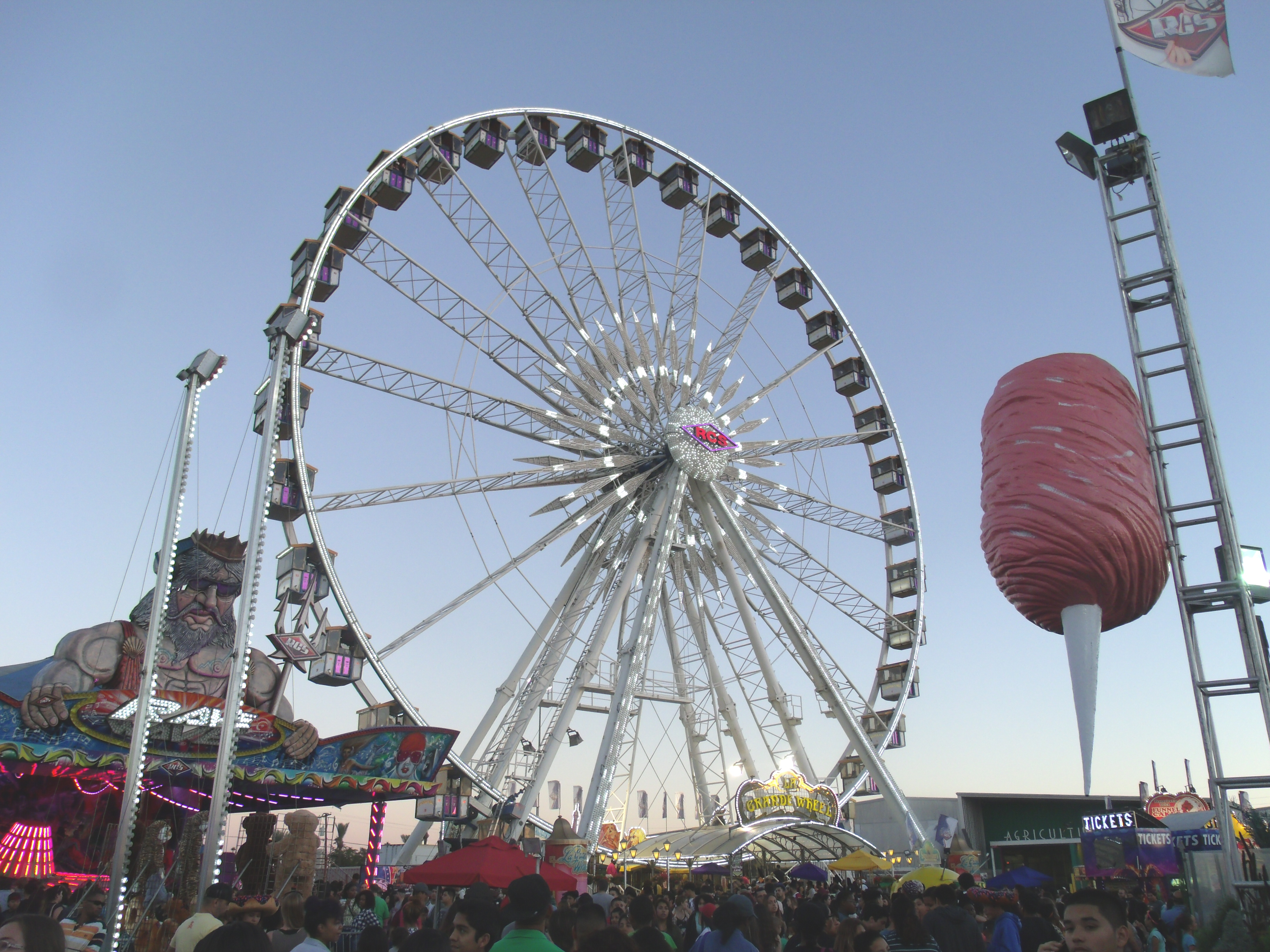
- La Grande Wheel, in the Arizona State Fair, is one of the larger transportable Ferris Wheels in the world. The height of La Grande Wheel is 40 metres (130 ft).
- Genre: State fair
- Dates: October (Closed Mondays & Tuesdays)
- Locations: 1826 W. McDowell Rd., Phoenix, Arizona, U.S. 85007
- Years active: 1884–1916, 1919–29, 1933–41, 1946–2019, 2021–present
- Website: http://azstatefair.com/

The Arizona State Fair is an annual state fair, held at Arizona State Fairgrounds in Phoenix, Arizona, United States. It was first held in 1884, but has had various interruptions due to cotton crop failure, the Great Depression era, World War I and World War II years, and the COVID-19 pandemic. From 1946 to 2019 and from 2021–present, the fair has been held annually. It was a territory fair before Arizona became a state in 1912. The Arizona Exposition and State Fair (official name) is a self-supporting state agency, and receives no money from the state's General Fund.

The fairgrounds serve as a host facility for a number of different tradeshows, events, and entertainment. The fairgrounds is the location for the Maricopa County Fair, the Arizona National Livestock Show, the Maricopa County Home & Garden Show, and more. The Fair typically has around 75 amusement rides, 110 food booths, and 300 commercial sales booths. The Arizona State Fair is one of the top 5 state fairs by yearly attendance in the country, drawing over a million visitors annually.

== History ==
=== 1884—1891 ===
The origins of the Arizona State fair start in 1884, when residents of the Arizona Territory organized the Arizona Territorial Fair to provide family entertainment. The fair was held near the banks of the Salt River, just west of Central Avenue. Entertainment included horses, roosters, baby chicks, elephants, zebras, giraffes, ostriches, camels, hippopotamuses, lions, gazelles, tigers, rhinoceroses, sheep, goats, sharks, pigs, cheetahs, topi-antelopes, hens, cats and dogs, apes, monkeys, pony and mule races, while agriculture, cattle (dairy and beef) and home economics were the common exhibits.

The Territorial Fair continued annually at this location until 1891 when the Salt River flooded and wiped out the buildings and racetracks.

=== 1892–1960 ===
George Nicholas Goodman, multi-term mayor of Mesa, Arizona, was appointed executive secretary of the Arizona State Fair Commission in 1956 at an annual salary of $8,400 (equivalent to $99,474 in 2025). Executive secretary was the highest role and today the title would be president. Goodman died unexpectedly in 1959 while in office. Goodman's appointment came after each of the two immediate proceeding executive secretaries resigned, one holding the office for only two weeks. Both of those men were compensated $1,800 a year more than Goodman.

=== Since 1961 ===
In 2018 the Arizona State Governor's Office did a formal review of the future of the grounds and buildings of the Arizona State Fair.

2020 saw the COVID-19 pandemic as grounds for cancellation. It was the first cancellation in 75 years. The fair did resume the next year.

== Historic structures ==
Historic buildings in the Arizona State Fair grounds
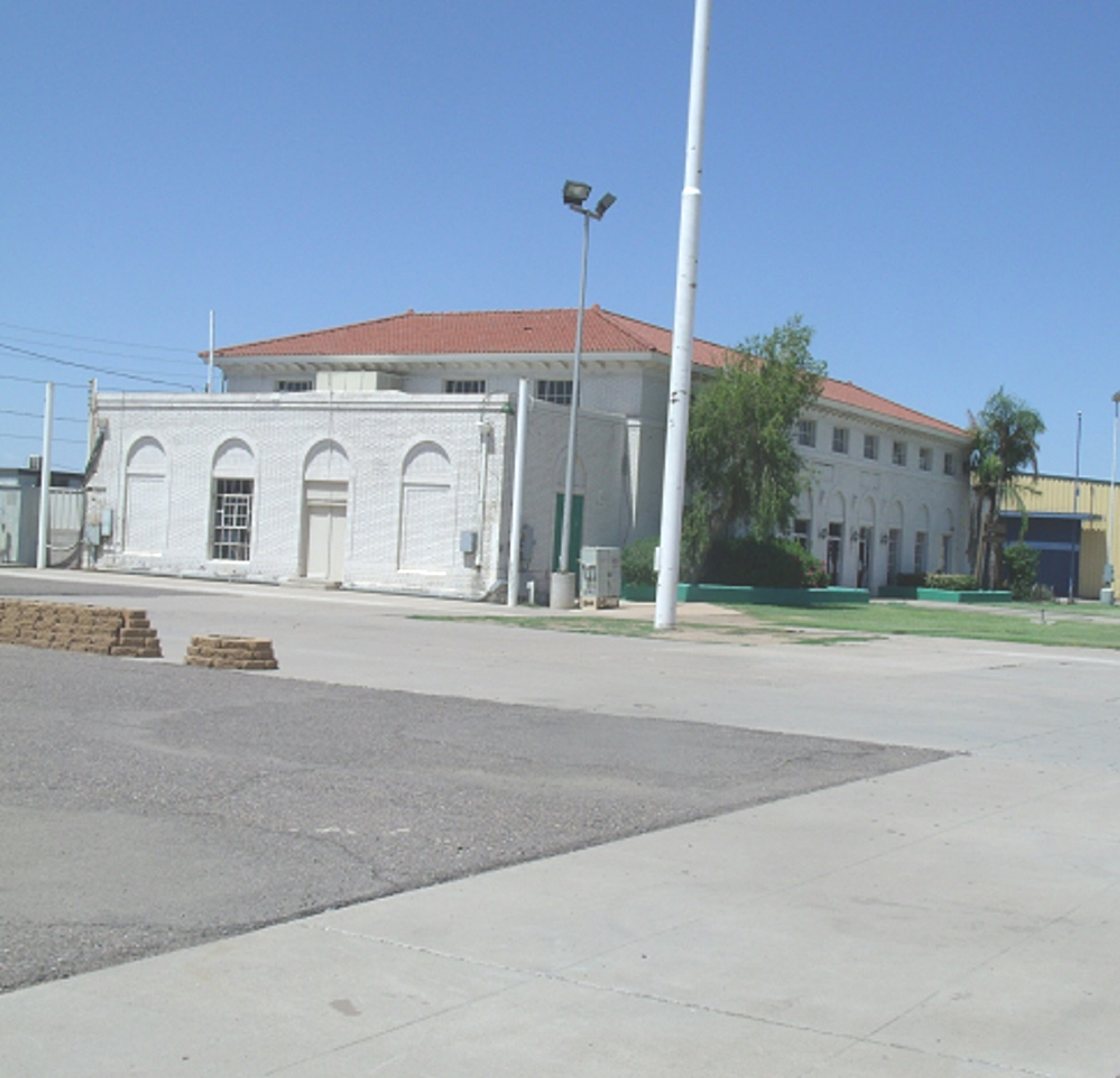
The Gem and Mineral Building built in 1918. It is Listed in the Phoenix Historic Property Register

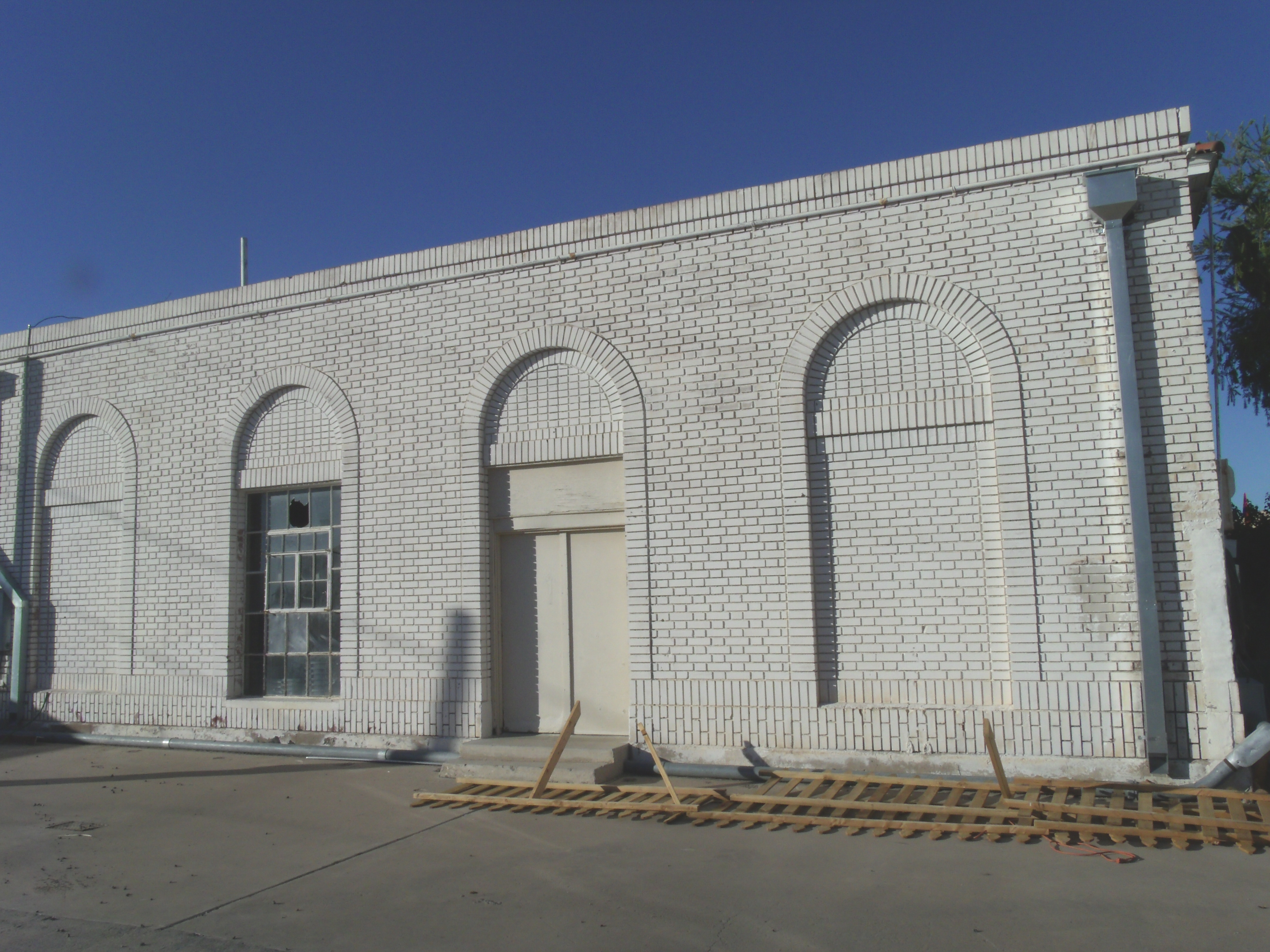
The side wall of the Gem and Mineral Building

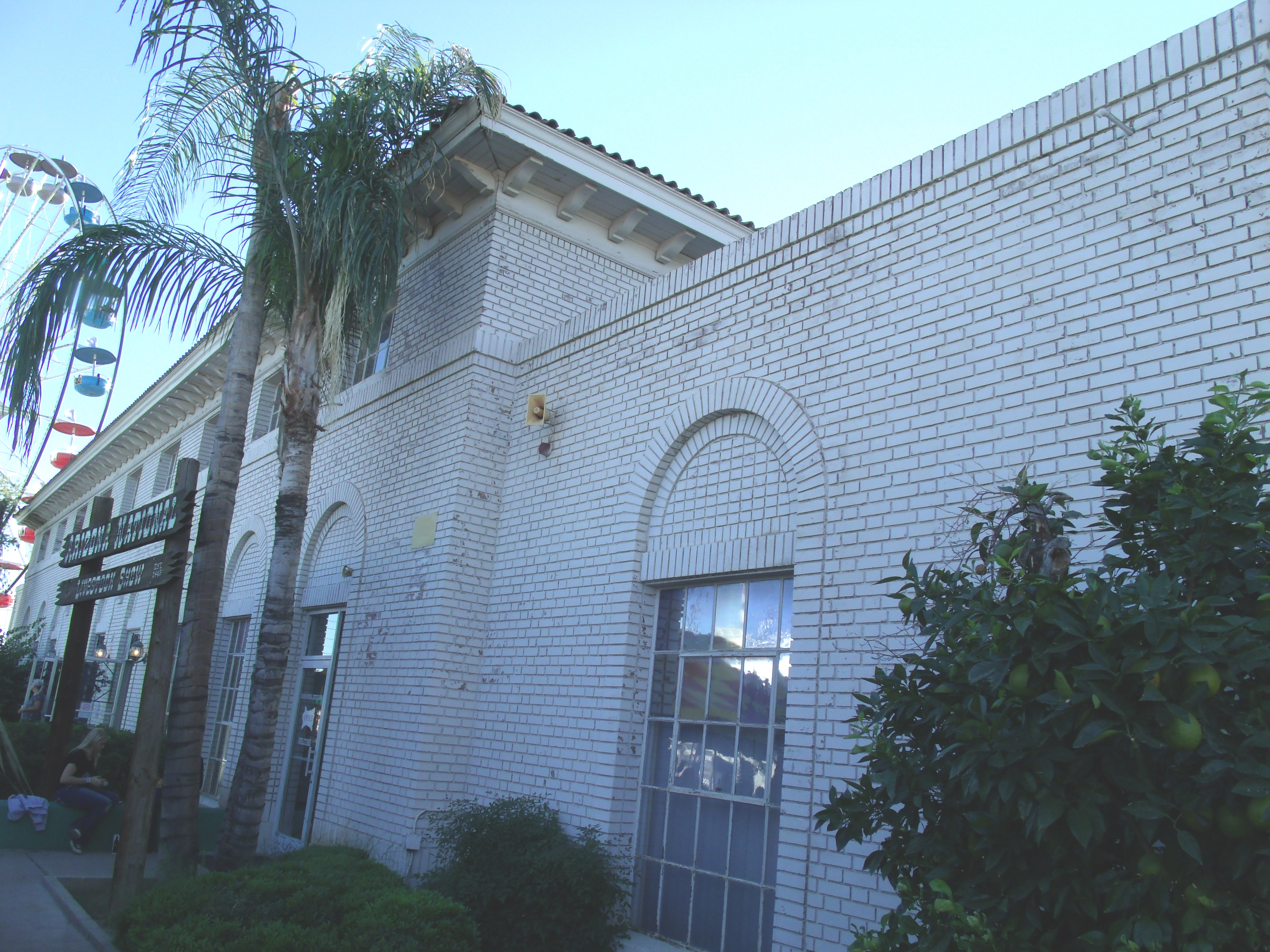
Close up view of the Gem and Mineral Building

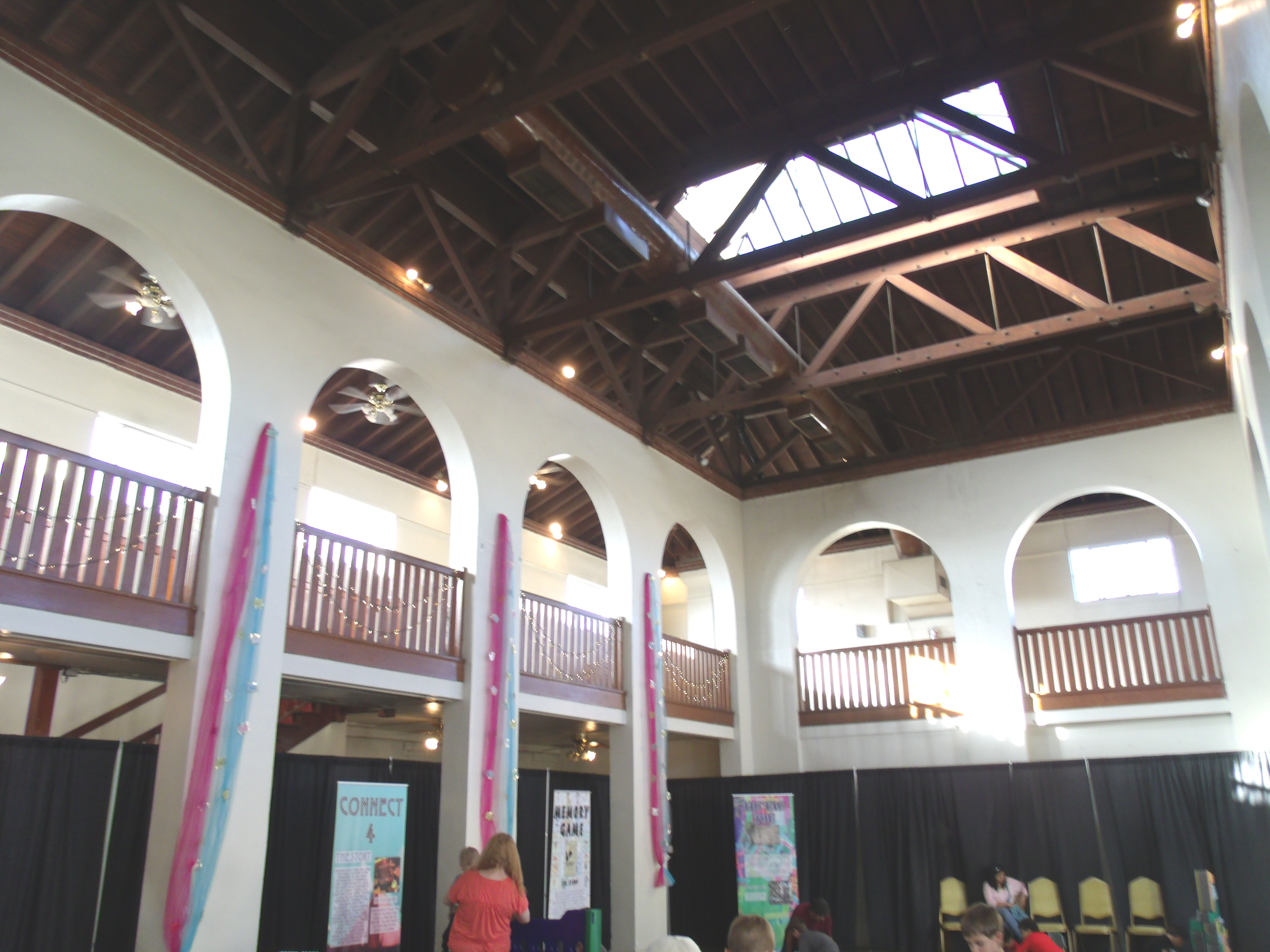
Inside the Gem and Mineral Building

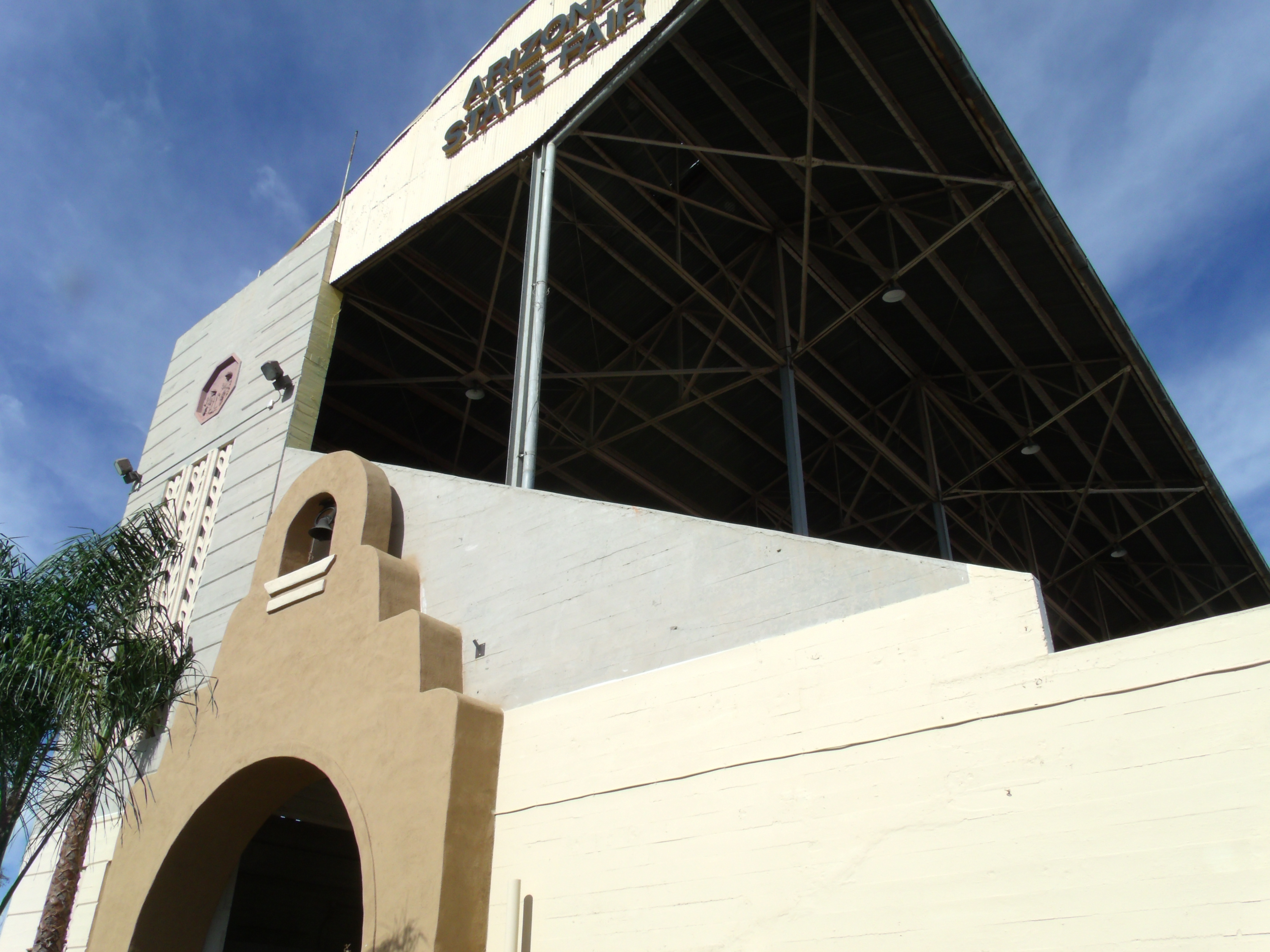
The Arizona State Fair Grandstand was built in the early 1900s .

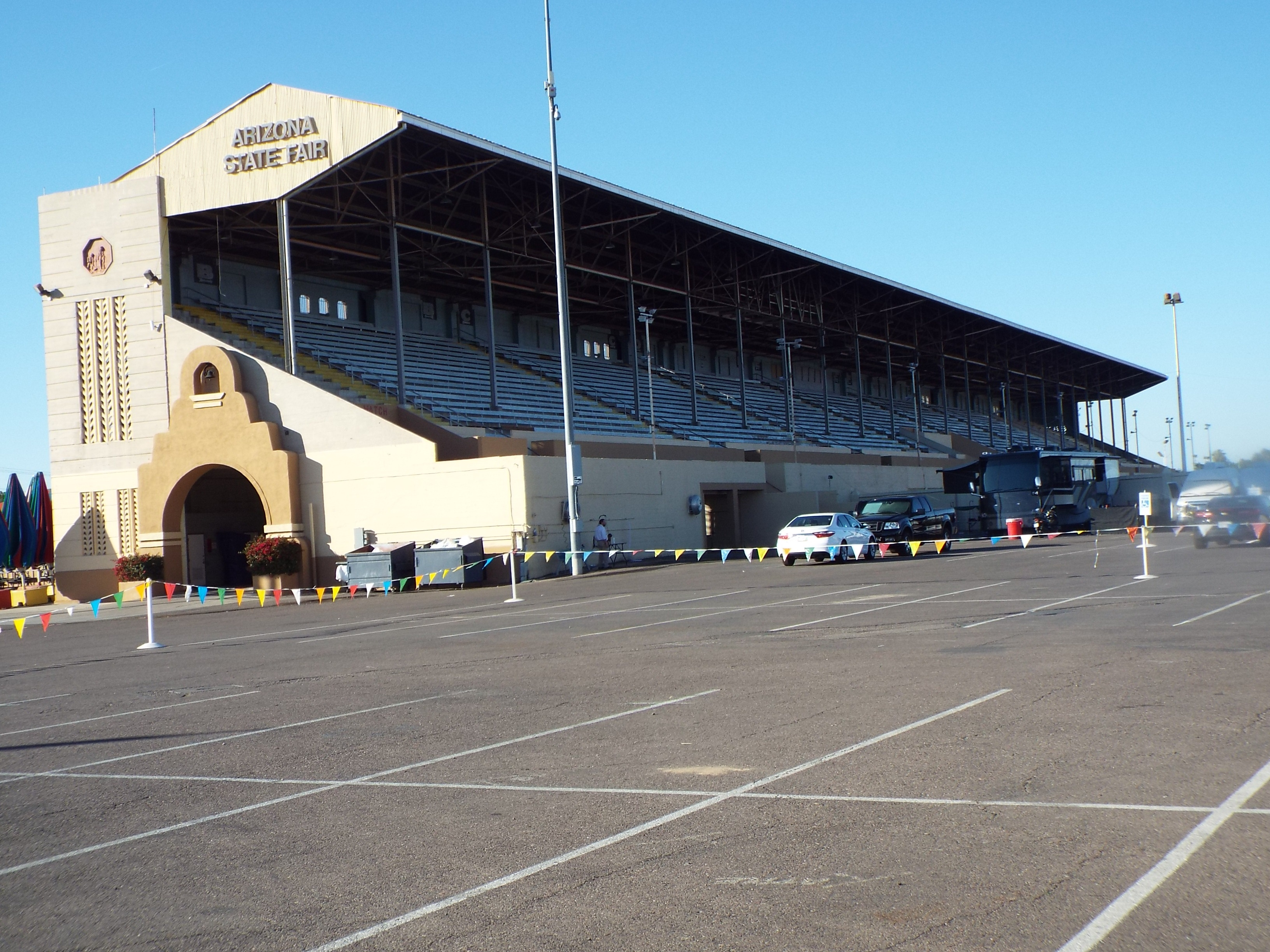
Different view of the Arizona State Fair Grandstand.

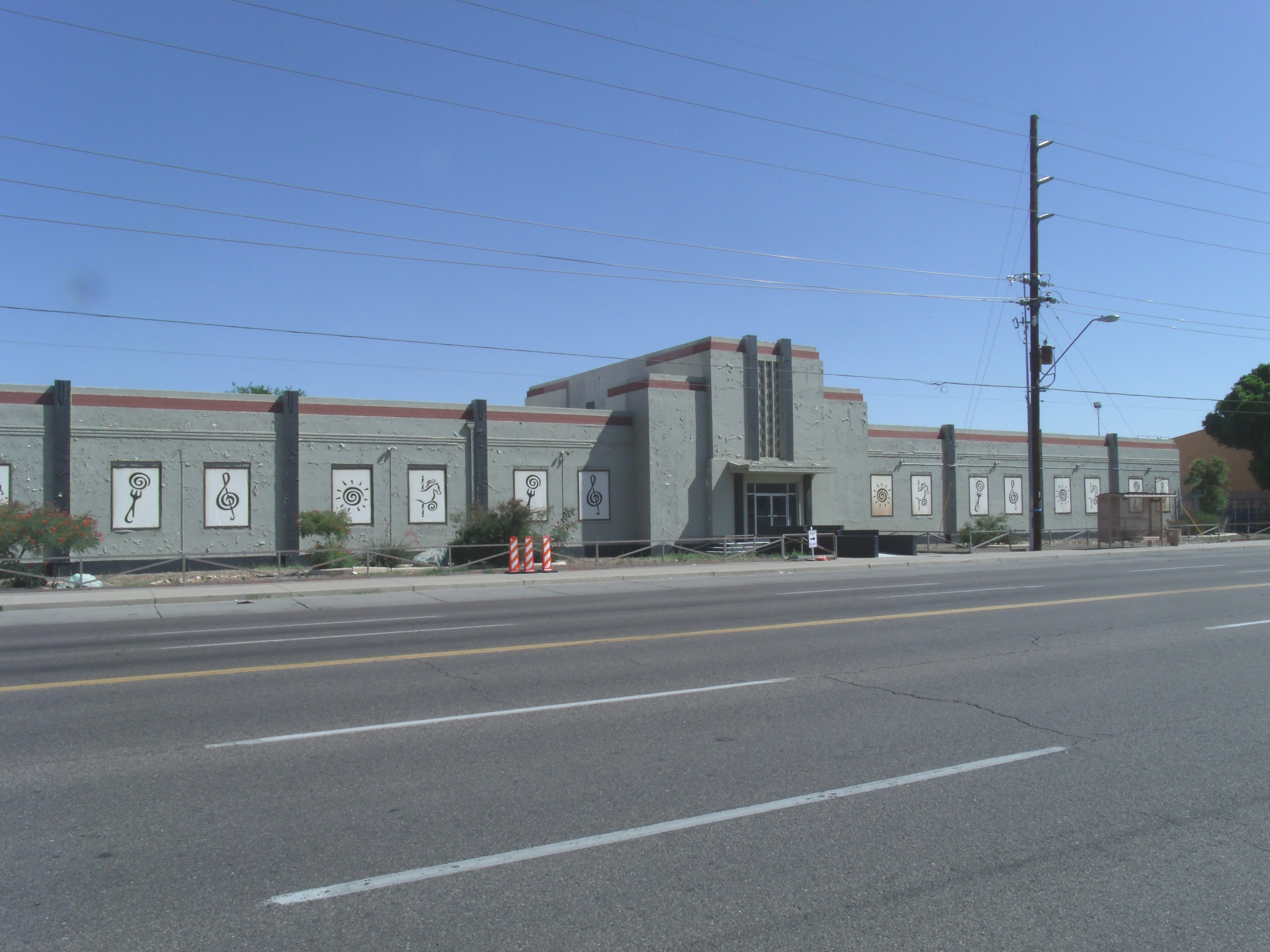
The Arizona State Fair WPA Civic Building was built during the Great Depression Era in 1938.

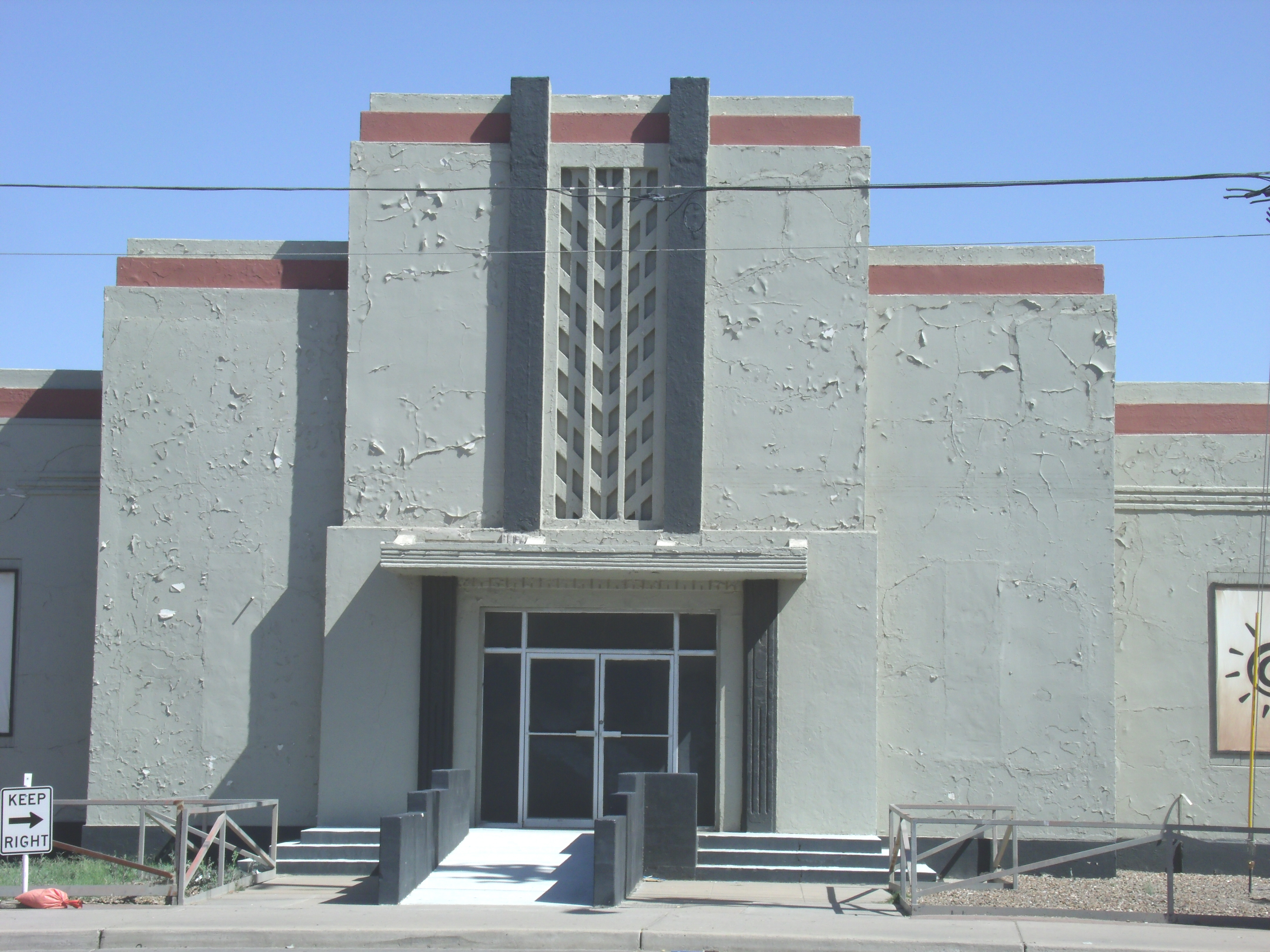
The front entrance of the Arizona State Fair WPA Civic Building
