= Maricopa County Fair =

Annual fair held at the Arizona State Fairgrounds

Coordinates: 33.281018°N 112.054986°W

The Maricopa County Fair is annually held in Phoenix, Arizona, at the Arizona State Fairgrounds. It began in the 1950s as a county fair and citrus festival.

Every year the fair holds a different theme. Exhibits hundreds of livestock exhibits from local 4-H and FFA clubs and chapters, arts, science fair, cook-offs, rides, tractor shows, live entertainment from musical artists, group tours, vendors, monster trucks, demolition derby, motocross, and food fill the fairgrounds. Saturday night hosts the Junior Livestock Auction when exhibitors have a chance to sell their projects they've worked on all year. The largest group of participants of the Maricopa County Fair is Arizona's youth.

The COVID-19 pandemic caused the fair to be cancelled in 2020-21. It resumed in 2022 following the hiatus.

== Operations ==
The fair is organized by Maricopa County Fair, Inc, a private non-profit 501(c)(3) organization that receives no tax revenue or funding from Maricopa County. The members of the organization are forty-five elected commissioners and two ex officio members. The Board of Directors is composed of nineteen volunteer members.

Private security guards, the Phoenix Police & Maricopa County Sheriff's Office patrol the fair.
