= Passage of Martin Luther King Jr. Day =

Political process behind the American holiday

- Long title: A bill to amend title 5, United States Code, to make the birthday of Martin Luther King, Jr., a legal public holiday.
- Enacted by: the 98th United States Congress
- Effective: January 1, 1986

Citations
- Public law: Pub. L. 98–144
- Statutes at Large: 97 Stat. 917

Codification
- U.S.C. sections amended: 5 U.S.C. § 6103

Legislative history
- Introduced in the House as H.R. 3706 by Katie Hall (D–IN) on July 29, 1983; Committee consideration by House Post Office and Civil Service Committee; Passed the House on August 2, 1983 (338–90); Passed the Senate on October 19, 1983 (78–22); Signed into law by President Ronald Reagan on November 2, 1983

A United States federal statute honoring the birthday of Martin Luther King Jr. and his work in the civil rights movement with a federal holiday was enacted by the 98th United States Congress and signed into law by President Ronald Reagan on November 2, 1983, creating Martin Luther King Jr. Day. The final vote in the House of Representatives on August 2, 1983, was 338–90 (242–4 in the House Democratic Caucus and 89–77 in the House Republican Conference) with 5 members voting present or abstaining, while the final vote in the Senate on October 19, 1983, was 78–22 (41–4 in the Senate Democratic Caucus and 37–18 in the Senate Republican Conference), both veto-proof margins.

Prior to 1983 there had been multiple attempts following the assassination of Martin Luther King Jr. to have a holiday created in his honor with Representative John Conyers introducing legislation in every legislative session from 1968 to 1983. In 1979 a vote was held on legislation that would have created a holiday on the third Monday in January, but it failed to receive two-thirds support and was later rescinded following an amendment changing its date.

While attempts were made to have a federally recognized holiday, numerous U.S. states recognized holidays in honor of King. Connecticut did so in 1973. Illinois adopted a commemoration day in 1969, and made it a paid holiday also in 1973. Other states continued to adopt state holidays up through Utah in 2000.

== History ==
=== National ===
==== Prior attempts ====
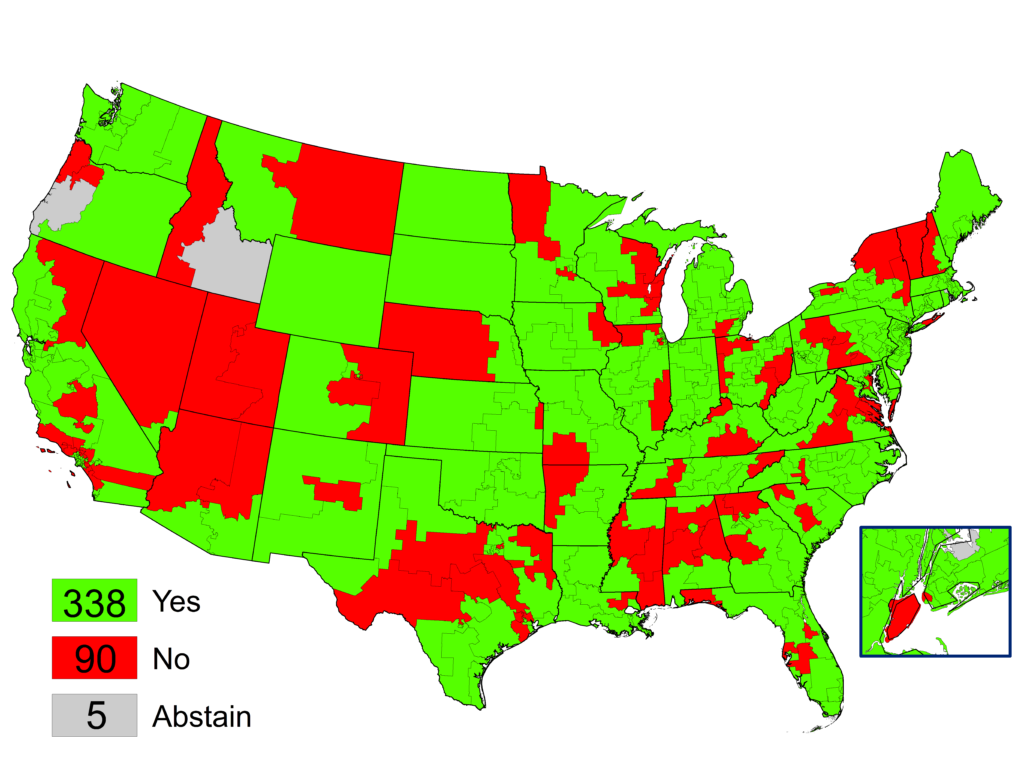
United States House of Representatives vote on the bill

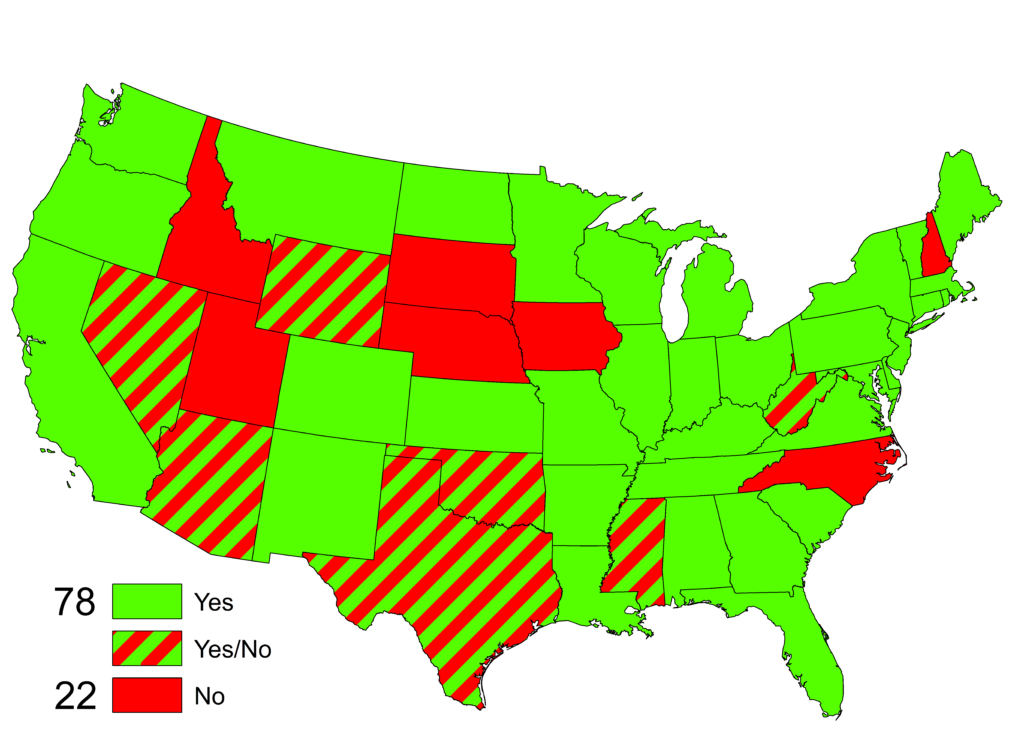
United States Senate vote on the bill

During the 90th Session of Congress following the assassination of Martin Luther King Jr. on April 4, 1968, Senator Edward Brooke and Representatives John Conyers and Charles Samuel Joelson introduced multiple bills that would create a holiday to honor King on either January 15 or April 4, but none of their bills went to a vote.

In 1971, Ralph Abernathy, the second president of the Southern Christian Leadership Conference and a close friend of King, submitted multiple petitions to Senator Adlai Stevenson III asking for a national holiday honoring King on his birthday to be created. On February 10, 1971, Senators George McGovern and Jacob Javits introduced a bill in the Senate to recognize King's birthday as a national holiday and issued a joint statement in support of it, but the bill failed to advance. In September 1972, Representative Conyers introduced another bill in the House along with 23 co-sponsors; this was approved by the House Judiciary committee but was not voted on by the full House.

On September 28, 1979, Representative Conyers introduced another bill to create a federal holiday in honor of King, and on October 19, Representative John Joseph Cavanaugh III stated that the U.S. House Committee on Post Office and Civil Service was planning to report the bill to the House floor. On October 23, the bill was reported to the House floor, but Conyers later had the bill delayed on October 30 as he felt that the bill would not reach the two-thirds vote needed for passage, without the addition of amendments that could weaken the bill. Representative Robert Garcia served as the floor manager of the bill and on November 13, the House voted 253 to 133 in favor of the bill, falling short of the two-thirds vote needed for passage. The House voted to amend the bill to move the date of the holiday from Monday to Sunday by a vote of 207 to 191 on December 6, but the bill was rescinded by its sponsors and the Congressional Black Caucus later criticized President Jimmy Carter for not being supportive enough of the bill.

==== Passage ====
On July 29, 1983, Indiana Representative Katie Hall introduced a bill to recognize the third Monday in January as a federal holiday "as a day of prayer in King's memory." The Atlanta Constitution argued that declaring the holiday was an inexpensive way to celebrate King's democratic ideals and that it had "been too long about this business already."

On August 2, the House voted 338 to 90 in favor of the bill, passing it on to the Senate. During the Senate deliberation on the bill, Senator Jesse Helms attempted to add amendments to kill the bill and distributed a 400-page FBI report on King describing him as a communist and subversive, leading Senator Daniel Patrick Moynihan to throw the report on the ground and refer to it as garbage. Senator Ted Kennedy accused Helms of making false and inaccurate statements, causing Helms to attempt to have Kennedy punished for a violation of rules that prohibit senators from questioning each other's honor. Senate Majority Leader Howard Baker only made Kennedy replace the word "inaccurate". The Senate rejected an attempt to kill the vote by a vote of 76 to 12 on October 18 and later approved the bill by a vote of 78 to 22 on October 19. President Ronald Reagan signed the bill into law on November 2, 1983, and on January 20, 1986, Martin Luther King Jr. Day was celebrated as a federal holiday for the first time.

==== Congressional vote ====
1979 U.S. House vote:	Party		Total votes
1979 U.S. House vote:	Democratic	Republican	Total votes
Yes	213	40	253 (58.3%)
No	33	100	133 (30.6%)
Not Voting	30	18	48 (11.1%)
Vacant	0	0	1
Result: Failed

Vote By Members

Roll call votes on the 1979 Martin Luther King Jr. Day vote
Representative	Seat	Vote
Don Young	AK at-large	No
Jack Edwards	AL 1st	No
William Louis Dickinson	AL 2nd	No
Bill Nichols	AL 3rd	No
Tom Bevill	AL 4th	Yes
Ronnie Flippo	AL 5th	No
John Hall Buchanan Jr.	AL 6th	Not voting
Richard Shelby	AL 7th	Yes
William Vollie Alexander Jr.	AR 1st	Yes
Ed Bethune	AR 2nd	Yes
John Paul Hammerschmidt	AR 3rd	Yes
Beryl Anthony Jr.	AR 4th	Yes
John Jacob Rhodes	AZ 1st	Yes
Mo Udall	AZ 2nd	Yes
Bob Stump	AZ 3rd	No
Eldon Rudd	AZ 4th	No
Harold T. Johnson	CA 1st	Yes
Donald H. Clausen	CA 2nd	Yes
Bob Matsui	CA 3rd	Yes
Vic Fazio	CA 4th	Yes
John Burton	CA 5th	Not voting
Phillip Burton	CA 6th	Yes
George Miller	CA 7th	Yes
Ron Dellums	CA 8th	Yes
Pete Stark	CA 9th	Not voting
Don Edwards	CA 10th	Yes
William Royer	CA 11th	No
Pete McCloskey	CA 12th	Not voting
Norman Mineta	CA 13th	Yes
Norman D. Shumway	CA 14th	No
Tony Coelho	CA 15th	Not voting
Leon Panetta	CA 16th	Yes
Chip Pashayan	CA 17th	Not voting
Bill Thomas	CA 18th	No
Robert J. Lagomarsino	CA 19th	No
Barry Goldwater Jr.	CA 20th	Not voting
James C. Corman	CA 21st	Yes
Carlos Moorhead	CA 22nd	No
Anthony Beilenson	CA 23rd	No
Henry Waxman	CA 24th	Yes
Edward R. Roybal	CA 25th	Yes
John H. Rousselot	CA 26th	No
Bob Dornan	CA 27th	No
Julian Dixon	CA 28th	Yes
Augustus Hawkins	CA 29th	Yes
George E. Danielson	CA 30th	Yes
Charles H. Wilson	CA 31st	Yes
Glenn M. Anderson	CA 32nd	Yes
Wayne R. Grisham	CA 33rd	No
Dan Lungren	CA 34th	No
James F. Lloyd	CA 35th	Yes
George Brown Jr.	CA 36th	Yes
Jerry Lewis	CA 37th	No
Jerry M. Patterson	CA 38th	Yes
William E. Dannemeyer	CA 39th	No
Robert Badham	CA 40th	No
Bob Wilson	CA 41st	Yes
Lionel Van Deerlin	CA 42nd	Yes
Clair Burgener	CA 43rd	No
Pat Schroeder	CO 1st	Not voting
Tim Wirth	CO 2nd	Yes
Ray Kogovsek	CO 3rd	Yes
James Paul Johnson	CO 4th	Not voting
Ken Kramer	CO 5th	No
William R. Cotter	CT 1st	Yes
Chris Dodd	CT 2nd	Yes
Robert Giaimo	CT 3rd	Yes
Stewart McKinney	CT 4th	Yes
William R. Ratchford	CT 5th	Yes
Toby Moffett	CT 6th	Yes
Earl Hutto	FL 1st	Not voting
Don Fuqua	FL 2nd	Not voting
Charles E. Bennett	FL 3rd	No
Bill Chappell	FL 4th	Yes
Richard Kelly	FL 5th	No
Bill Young	FL 6th	No
Sam Gibbons	FL 7th	Yes
Andy Ireland	FL 8th	Yes
Bill Nelson	FL 9th	Yes
Skip Bafalis	FL 10th	No
Dan Mica	FL 11th	Yes
Edward J. Stack	FL 12th	Yes
William Lehman	FL 13th	Yes
Claude Pepper	FL 14th	Yes
Dante Fascell	FL 15th	Yes
Ronald 'Bo' Ginn	GA 1st	Yes
Dawson Mathis	GA 2nd	Yes
Jack Brinkley	GA 3rd	No
Elliott H. Levitas	GA 4th	Yes
Wyche Fowler	GA 5th	Yes
Newt Gingrich	GA 6th	Yes
Larry McDonald	GA 7th	No
Billy Lee Evans	GA 8th	Yes
Ed Jenkins	GA 9th	No
Doug Barnard Jr.	GA 10th	Not voting
Thomas B. Evans Jr.	DE at-large	Yes
Cecil Heftel	HI 1st	Yes
Daniel Akaka	HI 2nd	Yes
Jim Leach	IA 1st	Yes
Tom Tauke	IA 2nd	No
Chuck Grassley	IA 3rd	No
Neal Edward Smith	IA 4th	Yes
Tom Harkin	IA 5th	Yes
Berkley Bedell	IA 6th	No
Steve Symms	ID 1st	No
George V. Hansen	ID 2nd	No
Bennett Stewart	IL 1st	Yes
Morgan F. Murphy	IL 2nd	Yes
Marty Russo	IL 3rd	Yes
Ed Derwinski	IL 4th	No
John G. Fary	IL 5th	Yes
Henry Hyde	IL 6th	Yes
Cardiss Collins	IL 7th	Yes
Dan Rostenkowski	IL 8th	Yes
Sidney R. Yates	IL 9th	Yes
Vacant	IL 10th	Vacant
Frank Annunzio	IL 11th	Yes
Phil Crane	IL 12th	Not voting
Robert McClory	IL 13th	Yes
John N. Erlenborn	IL 14th	No
Tom Corcoran	IL 15th	No
John B. Anderson	IL 16th	Not voting
George M. O'Brien	IL 17th	No
Robert H. Michel	IL 18th	Not voting
Tom Railsback	IL 19th	Yes
Paul Findley	IL 20th	No
Edward Rell Madigan	IL 21st	No
Dan Crane	IL 22nd	No
Melvin Price	IL 23rd	Yes
Paul Simon	IL 24th	Yes
Adam Benjamin Jr.	IN 1st	Yes
Floyd Fithian	IN 2nd	Yes
John Brademas	IN 3rd	Yes
Dan Quayle	IN 4th	Yes
Elwood Hillis	IN 5th	Yes
David W. Evans	IN 6th	No
John T. Myers	IN 7th	No
H. Joel Deckard	IN 8th	Yes
Lee H. Hamilton	IN 9th	Yes
Phillip Sharp	IN 10th	Yes
Andrew Jacobs Jr.	IN 11th	Yes
Keith Sebelius	KS 1st	Not voting
James Edmund Jeffries	KS 2nd	No
Larry Winn	KS 3rd	No
Dan Glickman	KS 4th	Yes
Bob Whittaker	KS 5th	No
Carroll Hubbard	KY 1st	Yes
William Natcher	KY 2nd	Yes
Romano Mazzoli	KY 3rd	Not voting
Gene Snyder	KY 4th	No
Tim Lee Carter	KY 5th	No
Larry J. Hopkins	KY 6th	Yes
Carl D. Perkins	KY 7th	Yes
Bob Livingston	LA 1st	No
Lindy Boggs	LA 2nd	Not voting
Dave Treen	LA 3rd	Not voting
Buddy Leach	LA 4th	Yes
Jerry Huckaby	LA 5th	Yes
Henson Moore	LA 6th	No
John Breaux	LA 7th	Not voting
Gillis William Long	LA 8th	Yes
Silvio O. Conte	MA 1st	Yes
Edward Boland	MA 2nd	Yes
Joseph D. Early	MA 3rd	Yes
Robert Drinan	MA 4th	Yes
James Shannon	MA 5th	Yes
Nicholas Mavroules	MA 6th	Yes
Ed Markey	MA 7th	Yes
Tip O'Neill	MA 8th	Not voting
Joe Moakley	MA 9th	Yes
Margaret Heckler	MA 10th	Not voting
Brian J. Donnelly	MA 11th	Yes
Gerry Studds	MA 12th	Yes
Robert Bauman	MD 1st	No
Clarence Long	MD 2nd	Yes
Barbara Mikulski	MD 3rd	Not voting
Marjorie Holt	MD 4th	No
Gladys Spellman	MD 5th	Yes
Beverly Byron	MD 6th	Yes
Parren Mitchell	MD 7th	Yes
Michael D. Barnes	MD 8th	Yes
David F. Emery	ME 1st	Yes
Olympia Snowe	ME 2nd	Not voting
John Conyers	MI 1st	Yes
Carl Pursell	MI 2nd	Yes
Howard Wolpe	MI 3rd	Yes
David Stockman	MI 4th	Not voting
Harold S. Sawyer	MI 5th	No
Milton Robert Carr	MI 6th	Yes
Dale Kildee	MI 7th	Yes
J. Bob Traxler	MI 8th	Yes
Guy Vander Jagt	MI 9th	Yes
Donald J. Albosta	MI 10th	Not voting
Robert William Davis	MI 11th	No
David Bonior	MI 12th	Yes
Charles Diggs	MI 13th	Yes
Lucien Nedzi	MI 14th	No
William D. Ford	MI 15th	Yes
John Dingell	MI 16th	Yes
William M. Brodhead	MI 17th	Yes
James Blanchard	MI 18th	Yes
William Broomfield	MI 19th	No
Arlen Erdahl	MN 1st	No
Tom Hagedorn	MN 2nd	No
Bill Frenzel	MN 3rd	No
Bruce Vento	MN 4th	Yes
Martin Olav Sabo	MN 5th	Yes
Rick Nolan	MN 6th	Yes
Arlan Stangeland	MN 7th	No
Jim Oberstar	MN 8th	Yes
Bill Clay	MO 1st	Yes
Robert A. Young	MO 2nd	Yes
Dick Gephardt	MO 3rd	Not voting
Ike Skelton	MO 4th	Yes
Richard Walker Bolling	MO 5th	Yes
Tom Coleman	MO 6th	Not voting
Gene Taylor	MO 7th	No
Richard Howard Ichord Jr.	MO 8th	No
Harold Volkmer	MO 9th	Yes
Bill Burlison	MO 10th	Yes
Jamie Whitten	MS 1st	Not voting
David R. Bowen	MS 2nd	Not voting
Sonny Montgomery	MS 3rd	No
Jon Hinson	MS 4th	No
Trent Lott	MS 5th	No
Pat Williams	MT 1st	Yes
Ron Marlenee	MT 2nd	No
Walter B. Jones Sr.	NC 1st	Not voting
Lawrence H. Fountain	NC 2nd	Yes
Charles Orville Whitley	NC 3rd	Yes
Ike Franklin Andrews	NC 4th	Yes
Stephen L. Neal	NC 5th	Yes
L. Richardson Preyer	NC 6th	Yes
Charlie Rose	NC 7th	Yes
Bill Hefner	NC 8th	Yes
James G. Martin	NC 9th	No
Jim Broyhill	NC 10th	No
V. Lamar Gudger	NC 11th	Yes
Mark Andrews	ND at-large	No
Doug Bereuter	NE 1st	No
John Joseph Cavanaugh III	NE 2nd	Yes
Virginia D. Smith	NE 3rd	No
Norman D'Amours	NH 1st	Yes
James Colgate Cleveland	NH 2nd	Not voting
James Florio	NJ 1st	Yes
William J. Hughes	NJ 2nd	Yes
James J. Howard	NJ 3rd	Yes
Frank Thompson	NJ 4th	Yes
Millicent Fenwick	NJ 5th	Not voting
Edwin B. Forsythe	NJ 6th	No
Andrew Maguire	NJ 7th	Yes
Robert A. Roe	NJ 8th	Yes
Harold C. Hollenbeck	NJ 9th	Yes
Peter W. Rodino	NJ 10th	Yes
Joseph Minish	NJ 11th	Yes
Matthew John Rinaldo	NJ 12th	Yes
Jim Courter	NJ 13th	No
Frank Joseph Guarini	NJ 14th	Yes
Edward J. Patten	NJ 15th	Yes
Manuel Lujan Jr.	NM 1st	No
Harold L. Runnels	NM 2nd	No
James David Santini	NV at-large	Yes
William Carney	NY 1st	No
Thomas Downey	NY 2nd	Yes
Jerome Ambro	NY 3rd	Yes
Norman F. Lent	NY 4th	Yes
John W. Wydler	NY 5th	No
Lester L. Wolff	NY 6th	Yes
Joseph P. Addabbo	NY 7th	Yes
Benjamin Stanley Rosenthal	NY 8th	Not voting
Geraldine Ferraro	NY 9th	Yes
Mario Biaggi	NY 10th	Yes
James H. Scheuer	NY 11th	Yes
Shirley Chisholm	NY 12th	Yes
Stephen Solarz	NY 13th	Yes
Fred Richmond	NY 14th	Yes
Leo C. Zeferetti	NY 15th	Yes
Elizabeth Holtzman	NY 16th	Not voting
John M. Murphy	NY 17th	Yes
Bill Green	NY 18th	Yes
Charles Rangel	NY 19th	Yes
Theodore S. Weiss	NY 20th	Yes
Robert Garcia	NY 21st	Yes
Jonathan Brewster Bingham	NY 22nd	Yes
Peter A. Peyser	NY 23rd	Yes
Richard Ottinger	NY 24th	Yes
Hamilton Fish IV	NY 25th	Yes
Benjamin Gilman	NY 26th	Yes
Matthew F. McHugh	NY 27th	Yes
Samuel S. Stratton	NY 28th	Yes
Gerald Solomon	NY 29th	Yes
Robert C. McEwen	NY 30th	No
Donald J. Mitchell	NY 31st	Yes
James M. Hanley	NY 32nd	Yes
Gary A. Lee	NY 33rd	Not voting
Frank Horton	NY 34th	Yes
Barber Conable	NY 35th	No
John J. LaFalce	NY 36th	Not voting
Henry J. Nowak	NY 37th	Yes
Jack Kemp	NY 38th	Not voting
Stan Lundine	NY 39th	Yes
Bill Gradison	OH 1st	No
Tom Luken	OH 2nd	Yes
Tony P. Hall	OH 3rd	Yes
Tennyson Guyer	OH 4th	No
Del Latta	OH 5th	No
Bill Harsha	OH 6th	No
Bud Brown	OH 7th	Yes
Tom Kindness	OH 8th	No
Thomas L. Ashley	OH 9th	Not voting
Clarence E. Miller	OH 10th	No
J. William Stanton	OH 11th	Yes
Samuel L. Devine	OH 12th	No
Donald J. Pease	OH 13th	Yes
John F. Seiberling	OH 14th	Yes
Chalmers Wylie	OH 15th	No
Ralph Regula	OH 16th	No
John M. Ashbrook	OH 17th	No
Douglas Applegate	OH 18th	No
Lyle Williams	OH 19th	Yes
Mary Rose Oakar	OH 20th	Yes
Louis Stokes	OH 21st	Yes
Charles Vanik	OH 22nd	Yes
Ronald M. Mottl	OH 23rd	Yes
James R. Jones	OK 1st	Yes
Mike Synar	OK 2nd	Yes
Wes Watkins	OK 3rd	No
Tom Steed	OK 4th	Yes
Mickey Edwards	OK 5th	Yes
Glenn English	OK 6th	No
Les AuCoin	OR 1st	Yes
Al Ullman	OR 2nd	Yes
Robert B. Duncan	OR 3rd	No
Jim Weaver	OR 4th	Yes
Michael Myers	PA 1st	Yes
William H. Gray III	PA 2nd	Yes
Raymond Lederer	PA 3rd	Yes
Charles F. Dougherty	PA 4th	Yes
Richard T. Schulze	PA 5th	No
Gus Yatron	PA 6th	Yes
Robert W. Edgar	PA 7th	Not voting
Peter H. Kostmayer	PA 8th	Not voting
Bud Shuster	PA 9th	No
Joseph M. McDade	PA 10th	Yes
Dan Flood	PA 11th	Not voting
John Murtha	PA 12th	Yes
Lawrence Coughlin	PA 13th	No
William S. Moorhead	PA 14th	No
Donald L. Ritter	PA 15th	No
Robert Smith Walker	PA 16th	No
Allen E. Ertel	PA 17th	Yes
Doug Walgren	PA 18th	Yes
William F. Goodling	PA 19th	No
Joseph M. Gaydos	PA 20th	Yes
Donald A. Bailey	PA 21st	Yes
Austin Murphy	PA 22nd	Yes
William F. Clinger Jr.	PA 23rd	No
Marc L. Marks	PA 24th	Yes
Eugene Atkinson	PA 25th	Yes
Fernand St. Germain	RI 1st	Yes
Edward Beard	RI 2nd	Yes
Tom Daschle	SD 1st	No
James Abdnor	SD 2nd	No
Mendel Jackson Davis	SC 1st	Yes
Floyd Spence	SC 2nd	No
Butler Derrick	SC 3rd	Yes
Carroll A. Campbell Jr.	SC 4th	No
Kenneth Lamar Holland	SC 5th	Not voting
John Jenrette	SC 6th	Yes
Jimmy Quillen	TN 1st	No
John Duncan Sr.	TN 2nd	Yes
Marilyn Lloyd	TN 3rd	Yes
Al Gore	TN 4th	Yes
Bill Boner	TN 5th	Yes
Robin Beard	TN 6th	No
Ed Jones	TN 7th	Yes
Harold Ford Sr.	TN 7th	Yes
Sam B. Hall Jr.	TX 1st	No
Charlie Wilson	TX 2nd	Not voting
James M. Collins	TX 3rd	No
Ray Roberts	TX 4th	No
Jim Mattox	TX 5th	Not voting
Phil Gramm	TX 6th	Yes
Bill Archer	TX 7th	No
Robert C. Eckhardt	TX 8th	Yes
Jack Brooks	TX 9th	Yes
J. J. Pickle	TX 10th	Yes
Marvin Leath	TX 11th	No
Jim Wright	TX 12th	Yes
Jack Hightower	TX 13th	Yes
Joseph P. Wyatt Jr.	TX 14th	Yes
Kika de la Garza	TX 15th	No
Richard Crawford White	TX 16th	No
Charles Stenholm	TX 17th	No
Mickey Leland	TX 18th	Yes
Kent Hance	TX 19th	Yes
Henry B. González	TX 20th	Yes
Tom Loeffler	TX 21st	No
Ron Paul	TX 22nd	No
Abraham Kazen	TX 23rd	Yes
Martin Frost	TX 24th	Yes
K. Gunn McKay	UT 1st	No
David Daniel Marriott	UT 2nd	No
Paul Trible	VA 1st	Yes
G. William Whitehurst	VA 2nd	No
David E. Satterfield III	VA 3rd	No
Robert Daniel	VA 4th	No
Dan Daniel	VA 5th	No
M. Caldwell Butler	VA 6th	No
J. Kenneth Robinson	VA 7th	No
Herbert Harris	VA 8th	Yes
William C. Wampler	VA 9th	No
Joseph L. Fisher	VA 10th	Yes
Jim Jeffords	VT at-large	No
Joel Pritchard	WA 1st	Yes
Al Swift	WA 2nd	Yes
Don Bonker	WA 3rd	Not voting
Mike McCormack	WA 4th	No
Tom Foley	WA 5th	Yes
Norm Dicks	WA 6th	Yes
Mike Lowry	WA 7th	Yes
Les Aspin	WI 1st	Yes
Robert Kastenmeier	WI 2nd	Yes
Alvin Baldus	WI 3rd	Yes
Clement J. Zablocki	WI 4th	No
Henry S. Reuss	WI 5th	Yes
Tom Petri	WI 6th	No
Dave Obey	WI 7th	Yes
Toby Roth	WI 8th	Not voting
Jim Sensenbrenner	WI 9th	No
Bob Mollohan	WV 1st	No
Harley Orrin Staggers	WV 2nd	Yes
John M. Slack Jr.	WV 3rd	No
Nick Rahall	WV 4th	Not voting
Dick Cheney	WY at-large	Yes

1983 U.S. House vote:	Party		Total votes
1983 U.S. House vote:	Democratic	Republican	Total votes
Yes	249	89	338 (77.9%)
No	13	77	90 (20.7%)
Not Voting	4	2	6 (1.4%)
Vacant	0	0	1
Result: Confirmed

1983 U.S. Senate vote:	Party		Total votes
1983 U.S. Senate vote:	Democratic	Republican	Total votes
Yes	41	37	78 (78%)
No	4	18	22 (22%)
Not Voting	0	0	0 (0%)
Vacant	0	0	0
Result: Confirmed

Vote By Members

Roll call votes on the 1983 Martin Luther King Jr. Day vote
Senator	State	Vote
Ted Stevens	AK	Yes
Frank Murkowski	AK	No
Howell Heflin	AL	Yes
Jeremiah Denton	AL	Yes
David Pryor	AR	Yes
Dale Bumpers	AR	Yes
Dennis DeConcini	AZ	Yes
Barry Goldwater	AZ	No
Alan Cranston	CA	Yes
Pete Wilson	CA	Yes
William L. Armstrong	CO	Yes
Gary Hart	CO	Yes
Chris Dodd	CT	Yes
Lowell Weicker	CT	Yes
William Roth	DE	Yes
Joe Biden	DE	Yes
Lawton Chiles	FL	Yes
Paula Hawkins	FL	Yes
Sam Nunn	GA	Yes
Mack Mattingly	GA	Yes
Spark Matsunaga	HI	Yes
Daniel Inouye	HI	Yes
Roger Jepsen	IA	No
Chuck Grassley	IA	No
James A. McClure	ID	No
Steve Symms	ID	No
Alan J. Dixon	IL	Yes
Charles H. Percy	IL	Yes
Richard Lugar	IN	Yes
Dan Quayle	IN	Yes
Nancy Kassebaum	KS	Yes
Bob Dole	KS	Yes
Walter "Dee" Huddleston	KY	Yes
Wendell Ford	KY	Yes
J. Bennett Johnston	LA	Yes
Russell B. Long	LA	Yes
Ted Kennedy	MA	Yes
Paul Tsongas	MA	Yes
George J. Mitchell	ME	Yes
William Cohen	ME	Yes
Paul Sarbanes	MD	Yes
Charles Mathias	MD	Yes
Donald Riegle	MI	Yes
Carl Levin	MI	Yes
David Durenberger	MN	Yes
Rudy Boschwitz	MN	Yes
John Danforth	MO	Yes
Thomas Eagleton	MO	Yes
John C. Stennis	MS	No
Thad Cochran	MS	Yes
John Melcher	MT	Yes
Max Baucus	MT	Yes
Jesse Helms	NC	No
John Porter East	NC	No
Quentin Burdick	ND	Yes
Mark Andrews	ND	Yes
Edward Zorinsky	NE	No
J. James Exon	NE	No
Gordon J. Humphrey	NH	No
Warren Rudman	NH	No
Frank Lautenberg	NJ	Yes
Bill Bradley	NJ	Yes
Jeff Bingaman	NM	Yes
Pete Domenici	NM	Yes
Chic Hecht	NV	No
Paul Laxalt	NV	Yes
Al D'Amato	NY	Yes
Daniel Patrick Moynihan	NY	Yes
Howard Metzenbaum	OH	Yes
John Glenn	OH	Yes
David Boren	OK	Yes
Don Nickles	OK	No
Mark Hatfield	OR	Yes
Bob Packwood	OR	Yes
John Heinz	PA	Yes
Arlen Specter	PA	Yes
John Chafee	RI	Yes
Claiborne Pell	RI	Yes
Strom Thurmond	SC	Yes
Fritz Hollings	SC	Yes
Larry Pressler	SD	No
James Abdnor	SD	No
Howard Baker	TN	Yes
Jim Sasser	TN	Yes
John Tower	TX	No
Lloyd Bentsen	TX	Yes
Orrin Hatch	UT	No
Jake Garn	UT	No
Paul Trible	VI	Yes
John Warner	VI	Yes
Robert Stafford	VT	Yes
Patrick Leahy	VT	Yes
Daniel J. Evans	WA	Yes
Slade Gorton	WA	Yes
Bob Kasten	WI	Yes
William Proxmire	WI	Yes
Robert Byrd	WV	Yes
Jennings Randolph	WV	No
Alan Simpson	WY	Yes
Malcolm Wallop	WY	No

=== State ===
==== Alabama ====
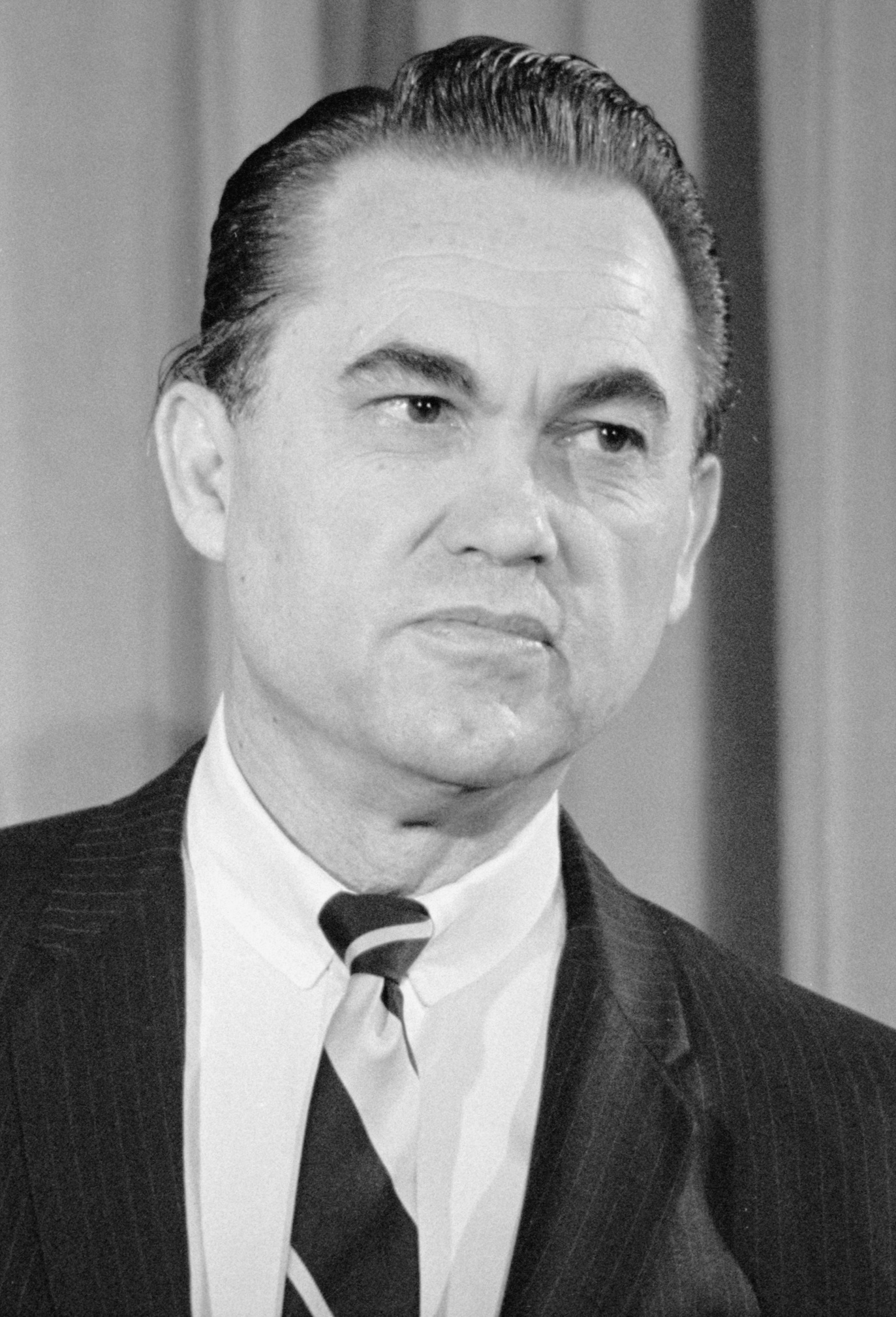
Governor George Wallace

In 1973, Coretta Scott King asked the Alabama Legislature to create a state holiday in her husband's memory on the second Monday in January and Representative Fred Gray, a former civil rights activist, submitted a law to create the holiday according to Coretta's wishes, but it was unsuccessful. Hobson City, Alabama's first self-governed all-black municipality, recognized King's birthday as a town holiday in January 1974.

The Montgomery County Commission voted 3 to 2 in favor of giving its employees a yearly holiday in honor of King on December 22, 1980. John Knight and Frank Bray were the first black people to serve on the commission after being inaugurated in November and voted in favor with Joel Barfoot while Mack McWhorter and Bill Joseph voted against it. However, on January 5, 1981, the commission voted 4 to 1 in favor of changing it from a yearly holiday to a one-time observance.

In February 1981, Governor Fob James sent his legislative program to the Alabama legislature which included a plan to decrease the amount of state holidays from 16 to 12, but would also give state employees the option of taking one day off for non-recognized state holidays that included King's birthday or the birthday of any other statesman. On February 13, 1981, Representative Alvin Holmes introduced a bill to create a state holiday in honor of King, but nothing came of it. On September 14, the Mobile County Commission approved a resolution to create a holiday in honor of King alongside an existing holiday honoring General Robert E. Lee with Douglas Wicks, the only black commissioner, submitting and supporting the bill and Jon Archer opposing it due to him favoring reducing the amount of county holidays. In December the Montgomery County Commission voted 3 to 2 against giving county employees a paid holiday in honor of King with Joel Barfoot, Mack McWhorter, and Bill Joseph against it and John Knight and Frank Bray for it.

In 1983, the all black Wilcox County Commission voted to give county employees a holiday for King's birthday while choosing to not observe Alabama's three Confederate holidays honoring Robert E. Lee, Jefferson Davis, and Confederate Memorial Day as well as Washington's birthday and Columbus Day. Representative Alvin Holmes created another bill that would combine Robert E. Lee and Jefferson Davis' birthday for a holiday in honor of King, but later submitted another bill that would only combine a holiday honoring King alongside Robert E. Lee.

On October 21, 1983, Governor George Wallace announced that he supported Holmes' bill to combine Lee and King's birthday holidays. The legislature didn't take action until 1984 when the Alabama House of Representatives voted unanimously in favor of the bill, passed the Senate Governmental Affairs Committee with all six members in favor, passed the Alabama Senate, and Wallace signed the bill into law on May 8, 1984, recognizing Lee-King Day.

Legislative votes

House votes:	Vote		Total votes
House votes:	Yes	No	Total votes
1984	75	0	75

Senate votes:	Vote		Total votes
Senate votes:	Yes	No	Total votes
1984	26	4	30

==== Alaska ====
On April 4, 1969, a resolution honoring King was submitted on the anniversary of his death, but the resolution was rejected by a vote of 10 to 8 in the Senate. Following the federal recognition of Martin Luther King Jr. Day a bill was introduced in the Alaska legislature to recognize it on January 15, 1987, and Governor Bill Sheffield declared it as a holiday on January 20. However, state employees were still required to work on the day leading to a union lead lawsuit that was ruled in their favor and the state was ordered to give $500,000 to its employees for overtime pay.

Vote by Members

1969 Senate Resolution vote
Senator	Party	Vote
Nick Begich Sr.	Democratic	Yes
Christiansen	Unknown	Yes
Josephson	Unknown	Yes
Merdes	Unknown	Yes
B. Phillips	Unknown	Yes
Rader	Unknown	Yes
Elton Engstrom Jr.	Republican	Yes
Keith Harvey Miller	Republican	Yes
Lowell Thomas Jr.	Republican	Yes
Blodgett	Unknown	No
Bradshaw	Unknown	No
John Butrovich	Republican	No
Haggland	Unknown	No
Harmond	Unknown	No
Kostosky	Unknown	No
Lewis	Unknown	No
Palmer	Unknown	No
Kathryn Poland	Democratic	No
Bob Ziegler	Democratic	No
V. Phillips	Unknown	Absent

==== Arizona ====
Senator Cloves Campbell Sr. introduced a bill on January 15, 1971, to recognize King's birthday as a state holiday, but it failed to advance. In January 1975, a bill was introduced in the senate to recognize King's birthday as a state holiday, and passed the Government and Senate Rules Committees and was passed by the Arizona Senate, but failed in the Arizona House of Representatives.

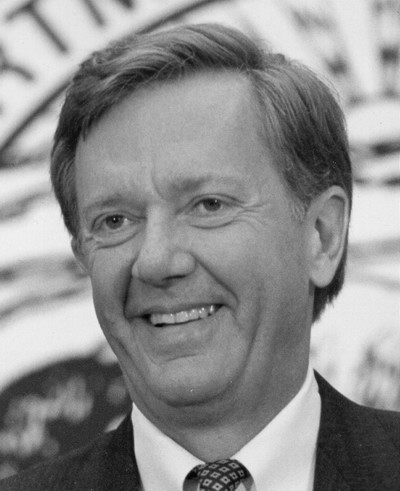
Governor Bruce Babbitt

In December 1985, Caryl Terrell asked Tempe's city council to recognize King Day, but it was rejected by the Finance and Personnel Procedures committees. On January 18, 1986, 1,000 people marched from the University of Arizona to El Presidio Park to honor King and in support of the recognition of Martin Luther King Jr. Day along with members of Tucson's city council. On January 20, 1986, 5,000 people marched in support of King Day in Phoenix and heard speeches given by Mayor Terry Goddard and Governor Bruce Babbitt who criticized the state legislature for not declaring King's birthday as a state holiday.

On February 7, 1986, the Government Senate Committee voted 4 to 3 in favor of advancing a bill that would create a state holiday in honor of King on the third Monday in January while derecognizing Washington and Lincoln's holidays. On February 19 the senate voted 17 to 13 in favor, but Speaker of the House James Sossaman removed the bill from the agenda after multiple Republicans representatives complained about the bill. The bill was brought back into the house's agenda, but Sossaman stated that it would most likely be defeated and the house voted 30 to 29 against the bill on May 9, 1986. Babbitt circumvented the state legislature and declared the third Monday of January as Martin Luther King Jr. Day as a state holiday via executive order on May 18, although only executive office employees would receive a paid holiday. However, Attorney General Robert K. Corbin stated that the governor did not have the power to declare state holidays and only the state legislature could do so although Babbitt stated that he would not rescind his proclamation and would only do so after a legal challenge.

Proposition 300
- Arizona Martin Luther King Jr. Day Amendment

Results
Choice	Votes	%
Yes	880,488	61.33%
No	555,189	38.67%
Valid votes	1,435,677	100.00%
Invalid or blank votes	0	0.00%
Total votes	1,435,677	100.00%
Yes
60–70%
50–60%
No
60–70%
50–60%

During the 1986 gubernatorial election former state senator Evan Mecham ran on a platform that included the removal of the holiday that was established via executive order by Babbitt and narrowly won the election due to vote splitting between Democratic Carolyn Warner and William R. Schulz, who had initially run in the Democratic primary, but after dropping out and reentering was forced to run an independent campaign.

On January 12, 1987, Mecham rescinded Babbitt's executive order causing Arizona to become the only state to de-recognize Martin Luther King Jr. Day. The following day presidential candidate and civil rights activist Jesse Jackson met with Mecham at a joint press conference after meeting for twenty minutes and asked him to reinstate the holiday, but Mecham refused and instead called for a referendum on the issue. 10,000 people marched in Phoenix to the state capitol building in protest of the action on January 19. On May 28, 1987, Norman Hill, president of the A. Philip Randolph Institute, gave a speech in Tucson at the state's AFL-CIO convention where he stated that unions should tell conventions to boycott Arizona and stated that Mecham's decision "caters to bigotry and encourages polarization (of the races)". The de-recognition resulted in $20 million in tourist business being lost due to multiple organizations canceling their conventions in protest, although some, like the Young Democrats of America, kept their conventions in Arizona.

On January 19, 1988, the Senate Judiciary Committee voted 5 to 4 in favor of sending a proposal that would let voters decide whether to create a paid holiday in honor of King on the third Monday in January or an unpaid holiday on a Sunday, but the bill was rejected in the Senate. Mecham was removed from office by the senate on April 4, after an impeachment trial for obstruction of justice and misuse of government funds. On April 14, the Senate Government Committee voted 5 to 4 in favor of a bill that would create a holiday in honor of King and combine Washington and Lincoln's holidays, but the Senate voteed 15 to 14 to reject the bill.

Following the failure of the state legislature to pass a bill creating a state holiday for King, Governor Rose Mofford put forward three options that she would look into: issuing the same executive order Babbitt had issued, wait until after the elections to see if there would be a more friendly makeup towards a King holiday, or wait for a special legislative session to include a King holiday in the plan. Mofford later stated that she would wait until after the elections to attempt to create a King holiday. Due to the failure of the governor and state legislature to create the holiday, another movement to boycott Arizona was created with support from Jesse Jackson and Democratic delegates supporting it and planning to perform a demonstration outside of the Democratic National Convention.

The Arizona Board of Regents voted unanimously on September 9, 1988, to create a paid King holiday at the three state universities that would give 20,000 of the state's 40,000 employees a paid holiday. Arizona State University later chose to end its observation of President's Day and replaced it with the Martin Luther King Jr. holiday.

On January 16, 1989, 8,000 people marched in Phoenix in support of the creation of a holiday in honor of King with Governor Rose Mofford, Goddard, and House Minority Leader Art Hamilton speaking. On February 2, the state house voted in favor of a bill creating a paid state holiday, but Senate President Bob Usdane did not take action on the bill until March 30 when he sent it to the Government Senate Committee where it died in committee. Democratic members of the House included the creation of a holiday inside an economic development bill, but the Commerce Committee voted 7 to 6 to separate the bills.

Another bill was created in the Senate that would end Arizona's observation of Columbus Day in favor of King Day and it passed the Senate Judiciary Committee with 6 to 3 in favor. The bill was passed by the Senate and House and signed by Governor Mofford on September 22, 1989. However, on September 25 opponents of the holiday filed with the Secretary of State to collect signatures to force a referendum on the recently passed bill and submitted enough signatures in December.

On March 13, 1990, the NFL had its annual meeting in Orlando, Florida, and one of the items on its agenda was to determine a host city for Super Bowl XXVII. Among the cities being considered was Tempe, and Arizona civil rights activist Art Mobley was sent to the meeting to make sure that the Arizona ballot initiative was a talking point at the discussion. The vote was conducted and Tempe was awarded the game, but committee chairman and Philadelphia Eagles owner Norman Braman warned that if the King Day ballot initiative went against adoption of the holiday, the NFL would pull the game from Arizona and move it somewhere else.

The bill eliminating Columbus Day was titled as Proposition 301 and another bill was passed by the legislature that would combine Washington and Lincoln's Birthdays and create a King Day was titled as Proposition 302. On November 6, 1990, both referendums were defeated with Proposition 301 being defeated in a landslide due to more effort being spent on Proposition 302 which was narrowly defeated by 50.83% to 49.17%. In March 1991 the house and senate passed a bill that would place a referendum on the creation of a King state holiday onto the 1992 ballot in an attempt to keep the Super Bowl in Arizona. On March 19, 1991, NFL owners voted to remove the 1993 Super Bowl from Phoenix due to the rejection of both referendums. It was estimated that the state lost at least $200 million in revenue from Super Bowl lodging and $30 million from the numerous convention boycotts. On November 3, 1992, Proposition 300 was passed with 61.33% to 38.67% and Super Bowl XXX was later held in Tempe, Arizona in 1996.

Legislative votes

House votes:	Vote			Total votes
House votes:	Yes	No	Not voting	Total votes
1986	29	30	1	60
1989	35	24	1	60
1989 (Note: Bill eliminating Columbus Day.)	37	21	2	60
1991	40	11	9	60

Senate votes:	Vote			Total votes
Senate votes:	Yes	No	Not voting	Total votes
1975	16	13	1	30
1986	17	13	0	30
1988	14	15	1	30
1989 (Note: Bill eliminating Columbus Day.)	17	11	2	30
1991	25	4	1	30

Vote by Members

1988 Senate vote
Senator	Party	Vote
John Hays	Republican	No
Tony Gabaldon	Democratic	Yes
James Henderson Jr.	Democratic	Yes
Bill Hardt	Democratic	Yes
Jones Osborn	Democratic	Yes
Alan Stephens	Democratic	Yes
Peter Rios	Democratic	Yes
Carol Macdonald	Republican	No
Jeff Hill	Republican	No
Jesus Higuera	Democratic	Yes
Jaime Gutierrez	Democratic	Yes
John Mawhinney	Republican	No
Greg Lunn	Republican	Yes
Bill De Long	Republican	No
Hal Runyan	Republican	Not voting
Wayne Stump	Republican	No
Pat Wright	Republican	No
Tony West	Republican	Yes
Jan Brewer	Republican	No
Lela Alston	Democratic	Yes
Carl Kunasek	Republican	No
Manuel Peña	Democratic	Yes
Carolyn Walker	Democratic	Yes
Pete Corpstein	Republican	No
Jacque Steiner	Republican	Yes
Peter Kay	Republican	No
Doug Todd	Republican	No
Robert Usdane	Republican	No
Jack Taylor	Republican	No
Jamie Sossaman	Republican	No

Referendum Results

1990 Proposition 301 Results
Choice	Votes	Percentage
No	768,763	75.36%
Yes	251,308	24.64%
Totals	1,020,071	100.00%

1990 Proposition 302 Results
Choice	Votes	Percentage
No	535,151	50.83%
Yes	517,682	49.17%
Totals	1,052,833	100.00%

1992 Proposition 300 Results
Choice	Votes	Percentage
Yes	880,488	61.33%
No	555,189	38.67%
Totals	1,435,677	100.00%

==== Arkansas ====
In February 1983, the Arkansas House of Representatives and the Arkansas Senate before being signed into law by Governor Bill Clinton allowing state employees to choose to take a holiday off on Martin Luther King Jr., Robert E. Lee, or their own birthday. In 1985, the state legislature voted to combine King and Lee's birthdays and stayed combined until March 14, 2017, when Governor Asa Hutchinson signed a bill separating the holidays.

Legislative votes

House votes:	Vote			Total votes
House votes:	Yes	No	Not voting	Total votes
1991	66	11	23	100

==== Connecticut ====
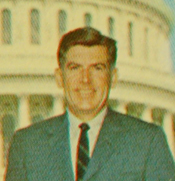
Governor Thomas Meskill

A bill to recognize King's birthday as a holiday was passed by both the Connecticut House of Representatives and Connecticut Senate in 1971, but was vetoed by Governor Thomas Meskill, who had initially supported the bill, citing the cost of having another paid holiday with it being around $1.3 million. The bill was reintroduced by Representative Irving J. Stolberg in 1972, and it passed in the senate again, but was defeated in the house. Governor Meskill issued a proclamation in 1973 recognizing King's birthday and Representative Maragaret Morton, the first black woman in the state assembly, later introduced a bill to create a holiday in honor of King, but it was shelved by the General Law Committee as they felt that Meskill would veto it again.

Supporters of the King holiday created a petition and it had received enough signatures from legislators in February 1973 to force public hearings on a bill for the holiday. Although the law initially put forward by the petition failed, an amended version passed the house 124 to 17 in favor and the senate with unanimity, and Governor Meskill signed it into law on June 14, 1973, making Connecticut the first state to recognize a holiday in honor of Martin Luther King Jr.

On March 4, 1976, Governor Ella Grasso stated that she would support moving the holiday from the second Sunday to January 15. The state legislature passed a bill to change the holiday's date and make it a paid holiday, and Grasso signed the bill on May 4, 1976, making the holiday fall on January 15 and as a paid holiday for Connecticut's 40,000 state employees.

Legislative votes

House votes:	Vote		Total votes
House votes:	Yes	No	Total votes
1971	97	41	138
1972	56	86	142
1973	124	17	141
1976	121	24	145

Senate votes:	Vote		Total votes
Senate votes:	Yes	No	Total votes
1971	25	9	34
1972	17	16	33
1976	32	4	36

==== Illinois ====
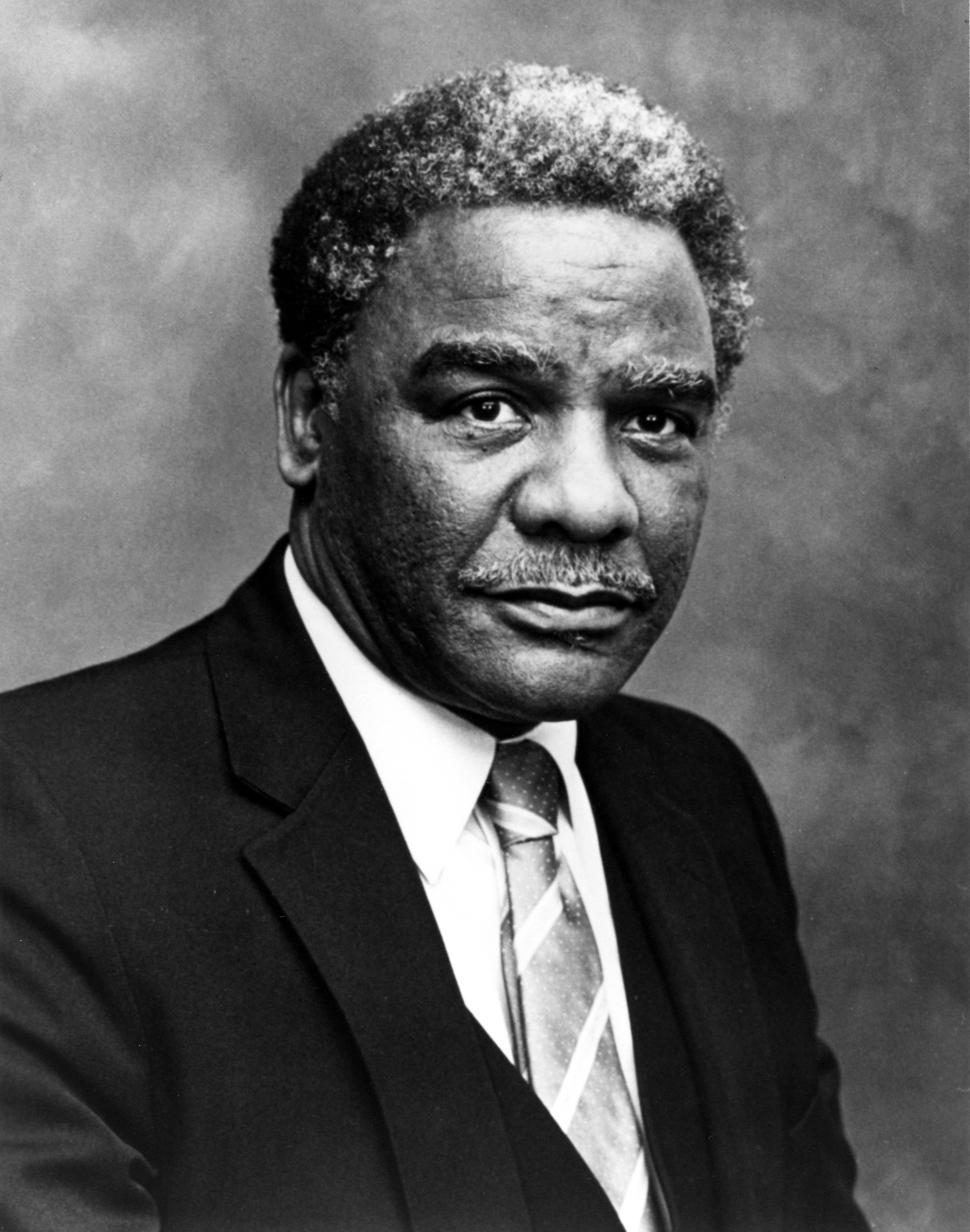
Harold Washington

Harold Washington, a state representative from the 26th district, introduced a bill to create a holiday in honor of Martin Luther King Jr. in 1969. The House executive committee voted to advance the bill, both state legislative chambers voted in favor of the bill and Governor Richard B. Ogilvie signed the bill creating a commemorative holiday in honor of King that would allow school services to be held in his honor.

Washington proposed a bill in 1970 to make the commemorative holiday a paid legal holiday but was unsuccessful. Washington reintroduced the bill in 1971, and it passed the house with 121 to 15 in favor and the senate with 37 to 7 in favor, but was vetoed by Governor Ogilvie. The Chicago Public Schools system started to observe King's birthday in 1972.

In January 1973, Washington, Susan Catania, and Peggy Martin reintroduced the bill in the Illinois House of Representatives. On April 4, the House voted 114 to 15 in favor of the bill, the Illinois Senate later voted in favor of it as well, and Governor Dan Walker signed the bill on September 17, 1973.

==== Kentucky ====
On January 15, 1971, Mayor Leonard Reid Rogers of Knoxville declared a holiday in honor of King in the city. In February 1972, state Senator Georgia Davis Powers introduced a bill that would create a state holiday in honor of King, but it did not make it through the committee although they told Davis to offer an amendment to a holiday bill currently in the legislature. However, Davis was absent when the bill came to the senate, but was able to offer an amendment to another holiday bill although the bill was defeated after her amendment passed.

On January 15, 1974, Powers and Representative Mae Street Kidd proposed bills to create a state holiday in honor of King and both bills passed through each chambers' committees. The Kentucky Senate and Kentucky House of Representatives passed the bill and on April 1, 1974, and Governor Wendell Ford signed it into law. Although the King holiday was not officially paired with Robert E. Lee Day both days would occasionally fall on the same day whenever the third Monday in January was on the 19th.

Governor Julian Carroll declared the first King Day in Kentucky in 1975, but state employees were not given the day off with Carroll citing an economic crisis as the reason.

Legislative votes

House votes:	Vote		Total votes
House votes:	Yes	No	Total votes
1974	50	6	56

Senate votes:	Vote		Total votes
Senate votes:	Yes	No	Total votes
1974	30	1	31

==== Maine ====
On February 13, 1986, a bill to create a paid holiday in honor of King was defeated in the house, but was later modified to make it optional and passed the Maine Senate and Maine House of Representatives before being signed by Governor Joseph E. Brennan and going into effect on July 16, 1986.

Legislative votes

House votes:	Vote			Total votes
House votes:	Yes	No	Not voting	Total votes
1986	77	61	13	151

Senate votes:	Vote			Total votes
Senate votes:	Yes	No	Not voting	Total votes
1986	24	5	6	35

==== Massachusetts ====
In 1974, members of the Massachusetts Black Caucus introduced a bill to recognize Martin Luther King Jr.'s birthday as a state holiday, but it died in committee. However, the bill was revived by state Senator Joseph F. Timilty who changed it to a half-holiday that would allow businesses to stay open, but governmental offices would close. The bill passed both the House and Senate before being signed into law by Governor Francis Sargent on July 8, 1974.

Legislative votes

House votes:	Vote			Total votes
House votes:	Yes	No	Not voting	Total votes
1974	160	53	27	240

==== Missouri ====
On January 7, 1971, Mayor Alfonso J. Cervantes of St. Louis signed into law a bill that would create a city holiday in honor of Martin Luther King on January 15.

==== New Hampshire ====
On February 11, 1999, Jesse Jackson spoke in Portsmouth where he stated that he was considering a presidential run and asked for New Hampshire to recognize a state holiday in honor of King. On April 8, 1999, the Senate voted in favor of a bill renaming Civil Rights Day to Martin Luther King Jr. Civil Rights Day and was later passed by the House before being signed by Governor Jeanne Shaheen on June 7.

Legislative votes

House votes:	Vote			Total votes
House votes:	Yes	No	Not voting	Total votes
1999	212	148	40	400

Senate votes:	Vote			Total votes
Senate votes:	Yes	No	Not voting	Total votes
1987	19	5	0	24

==== North Dakota ====
Governor George A. Sinner appointed a commission in 1985 to coordinate the state's federal observation of Martin Luther King Jr. Day, but state employees were not given the day off. In 1987, a bill was introduced to recognize it as a state holiday and was passed by the House and Senate before being signed by Governor Sinner on March 13, 1987.

Legislative votes

House votes:	Vote			Total votes
House votes:	Yes	No	Not voting	Total votes
1987	64	39	3	106

Senate votes:	Vote			Total votes
Senate votes:	Yes	No	Not voting	Total votes
1987	27	26	0	53

==== Ohio ====
On January 14, 1975, Cincinnati's city council recognized a city holiday in honor of King and approved a resolution in support of a statewide holiday bill created by state Senator Bill Bowen. Bowen's bill passed the Senate and House before being signed into law by Governor Jim Rhodes on May 2, 1975.

Legislative votes

House votes:	Vote			Total votes
House votes:	Yes	No	Not voting	Total votes
1975	57	33	9	99

Senate votes:	Vote			Total votes
Senate votes:	Yes	No	Not voting	Total votes
1987	24	5	4	33

==== South Carolina ====
Governor Jim Hodges signed legislation on May 1, 2000, which made a paid holiday for King and Confederate Memorial Day. The NAACP opposed the legislation due to it also creating a pro-Confederate holiday. Most counties in South Carolina celebrated King's holiday, except for Greenville and York. The county councils in York voted to recognize the holiday in 2003, and Greenville on February 1, 2005.

==== Wyoming ====
Representative Rodger McDaniel introduced a bill in 1973 that would create a holiday in honor of Martin Luther King Jr., but nothing became of the bill. Another bill creating a King holiday was introduced in 1986 by Representative Harriet Elizabeth Byrd, but it was rejected. Governor Mike Sullivan signed an executive order in 1989 that would have Wyoming observe a holiday in honor of King only for 1990. On January 2, 1990, the Albany County Commission voted to observe King Day for only 1990.

A bill creating a holiday in honor of King that would end Wyoming's observation of Columbus Day was introduced in 1990. An attempt to change its name from Martin Luther King Jr. Day to Wyoming Equality Day was defeated by a vote of 32 to 29 although it was later renamed as Martin Luther King, Jr./Wyoming Equality Day as a compromise to allow it to pass. The bill passed the House and Senate and Governor Sullivan signed the bill into law on March 15, 1990.

Legislative votes

House votes:	Vote			Total votes
House votes:	Yes	No	Not voting	Total votes
1990	48	16	0	64

Senate votes:	Vote			Total votes
Senate votes:	Yes	No	Not voting	Total votes
1990	21	9	0	30

== Timeline ==
Timeline of Passage of Martin Luther King Jr. Day
Year	State	Action	Percent of states
April 4, 1968	TN	Death of Martin Luther King Jr.	0%
June 18, 1971	CT	Vetoed	0%
September 28, 1971	IL	Vetoed	0%
June 14, 1973	CT	Recognized	2%
September 17, 1973	IL	Recognized	4%
April 1, 1974	KY	Recognized	6%
July 8, 1974	MA	Recognized	8%
1975	RI	Recognized	10%
May 2, 1975	OH	Recognized	12%
May 4, 1976	CT	Amended date and paid	12%
1977	NJ	Recognized	14%
1977	MI	Recognized	16%
1977	LA	Recognized	18%
1978	MD	Recognized	20%
1978	PA	Recognized	22%
1978	SC	Recognized	24%
1979	MO	Recognized	26%
1982	WV	Recognized	28%
1983	WI	Recognized	30%
March 7, 1983	AR	Recognized	32%
1983	CA	Recognized	34%
1983	NC	Recognized	36%
November 2, 1983	USA	Recognized Federal Holiday to begin in 1986	36%
1984	VA	Recognized	38%
1984	TN	Recognized	40%
1984	NY	Recognized	42%
1984	MN	Recognized	44%
1984	GA	Recognized	46%
1984	DE	Recognized	48%
May 8, 1984	AL	Recognized	50%
1985	CO	Recognized	52%
1985	KS	Recognized	54%
1985	NE	Recognized	56%
1985	OK	Recognized	58%
1985	OR	Recognized	60%
1985	WA	Recognized	62%
1986	VT	Recognized	64%
1986	IN	Recognized	66%
May 18, 1986	AZ	Recognized	68%
July 16, 1986	ME	Recognized	70%
1987	MS	Recognized	72%
1987	NV	Recognized	74%
1987	NM	Recognized	76%
January 12, 1987	AZ	Derecognized	74%
January 20, 1987	AK	Recognized	76%
March 13, 1987	ND	Recognized	78%
1987	TX	Recognized	80%
1988	HI	Recognized	82%
1988	FL	Recognized	84%
1989	IA	Recognized	86%
1990	ID	Recognized	88%
1990	SD	Recognized	90%
March 15, 1990	WY	Recognized	92%
November 6, 1990	AZ	Referendum	92%
November 6, 1990	AZ	Referendum	92%
1991	MT	Recognized	94%
November 3, 1992	AZ	Referendum	96%
June 7, 1999	NH	Recognized	98%
May 1, 2000	SC	Paid holiday	100%
2000	UT	Recognized	100%
March 14, 2017	AR	Separated holidays	100%
