= William R. Schulz =

American businessman and politician

- Born: William R. Schulz; April 4, 1931 (age 95); Des Moines, Iowa, U.S.
- Education: Harvard Business School; U.S. Military Academy
- Occupations: Businessman, politician
- Spouse: Lelia Schulz

William R. Schulz (born April 4, 1931) is an American businessman who was an independent candidate for Governor of Arizona in the 1986 gubernatorial election, and was the Democratic nominee against Barry Goldwater in the 1980 U.S. Senate election.

== Early life, career and education ==
Bill Schulz was born in Des Moines, Iowa on April 4, 1931, to Herman Schulz and Ellen Margaret Hazelrigg. He attended Greenwood Elementary School. Bill graduated from the Kentucky Military Institute in 1949, and the United States Military Academy at West Point in 1954. He served as a United States Army officer in West Germany from 1954 to 1957, reaching the rank of 2nd Lieutenant. He resigned his commission to focus on a career in business, and attended Harvard University's business school, graduating in 1959.

Following his graduation from Harvard Business School, Schulz founded his own business, known as Homesmith, which offered home repair services in the Palo Alto, California area. Schulz then founded W. R. Schulz and Associates, which owned and managed 88 garden apartment properties in the Phoenix metropolitan area. As of 2026, W. R. Schulz still manages Forest Park Apartments b. 1962 (3800 N. 6th Ave.: 308 units) and Fountains in the Green b. 1955 (3019 N. 14th St.: 327 units) in the midtown Phoenix area. Schulz is credited with getting the Apartment Renter's Tax Relief Bill passed through the state legislature, which led to his involvement in politics.

Bill is known for his humor and practicality when confronted with small business challenges, and his love of trees. He is the author of "Looking Back, With Some Forward Thoughts," a no-holds family history up to 1990.

== Political career ==
Schulz's first foray into seeking political office began with the 1978 gubernatorial election, where he ran as a Democratic candidate, challenging incumbent Governor Wesley Bolin. He announced his campaign after traveling around the state, and compiled the research into a "Goals for Arizona" campaign. Following the death of Bolin in March 1978, Schulz withdrew from the election and endorsed Bruce Babbitt, who ascended to the governorship. Babbitt was Attorney General of Arizona at the time of Bolin's death.

Following his 1978 gubernatorial election withdrawal, Schulz announced his intention to run for the U.S. Senate in the 1980 election, and challenge incumbent U.S. Senator Barry Goldwater. His campaign slogan was "Energy for the Eighties," and Schulz won the Democratic nomination, defeating two other candidates. In the general election, Schulz lost by a very narrow margin, with Goldwater receiving 49.5% to Schulz's 48.4%. He conceded rather than dispute the collection or provenance of the ballots. Schulz announced his intention in 1984 to run for the governorship once again in the 1986 election, but initially withdrew from the race in 1985 due to the health of his daughter. Schulz then decided to re-enter the race, but was required to do so as an independent candidate, as he was not able to seek the Democratic nomination. In September 1986, Schulz collected enough signatures to be placed on the November ballot as an independent. During the election, Schulz was criticized for constantly changing his position on the issues. Despite Schulz leading in many polls leading up to the election, Republican nominee Evan Mecham was elected as Governor, due to the race being split into a three-way contest, and causing the Democratic nominee Carolyn Warner to lose by a narrow margin to Mecham. Mecham would be impeached from office only two years later, but the 1986 gubernatorial race ended Schulz's political career and he returned to the private sector.

Party political offices
Preceded by Jonathan Marshall	Democratic nominee for U.S. Senator from Arizona (Class 3); 1980	Succeeded by Richard Kimball
