= 1986 Arizona gubernatorial election =

- November 4, 1986
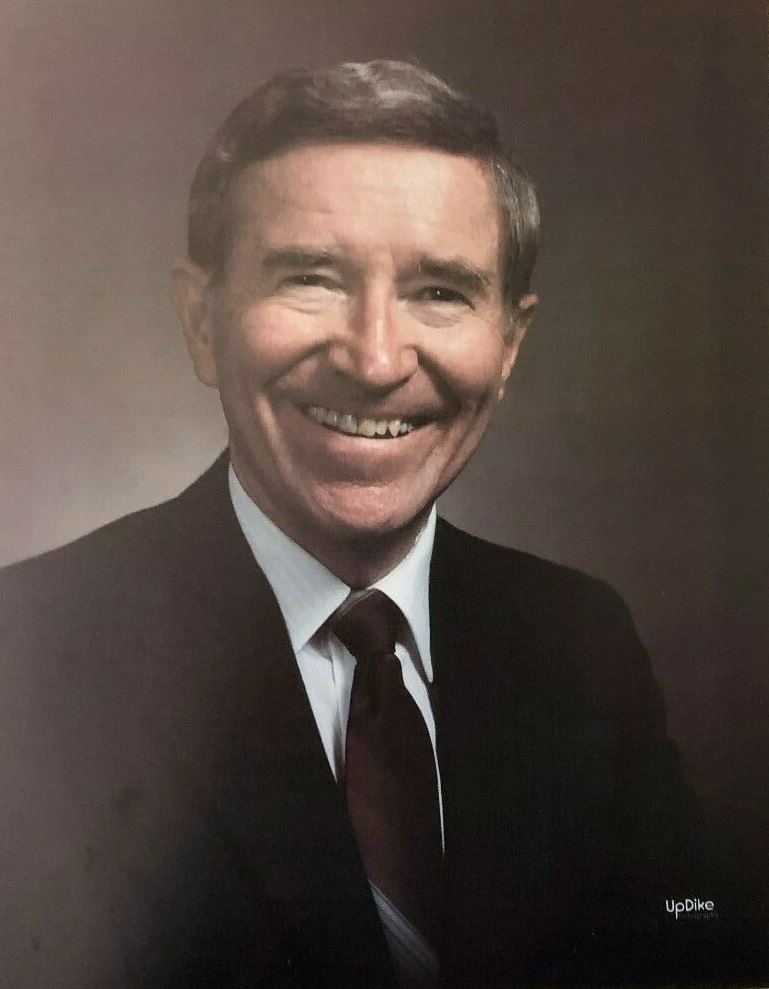

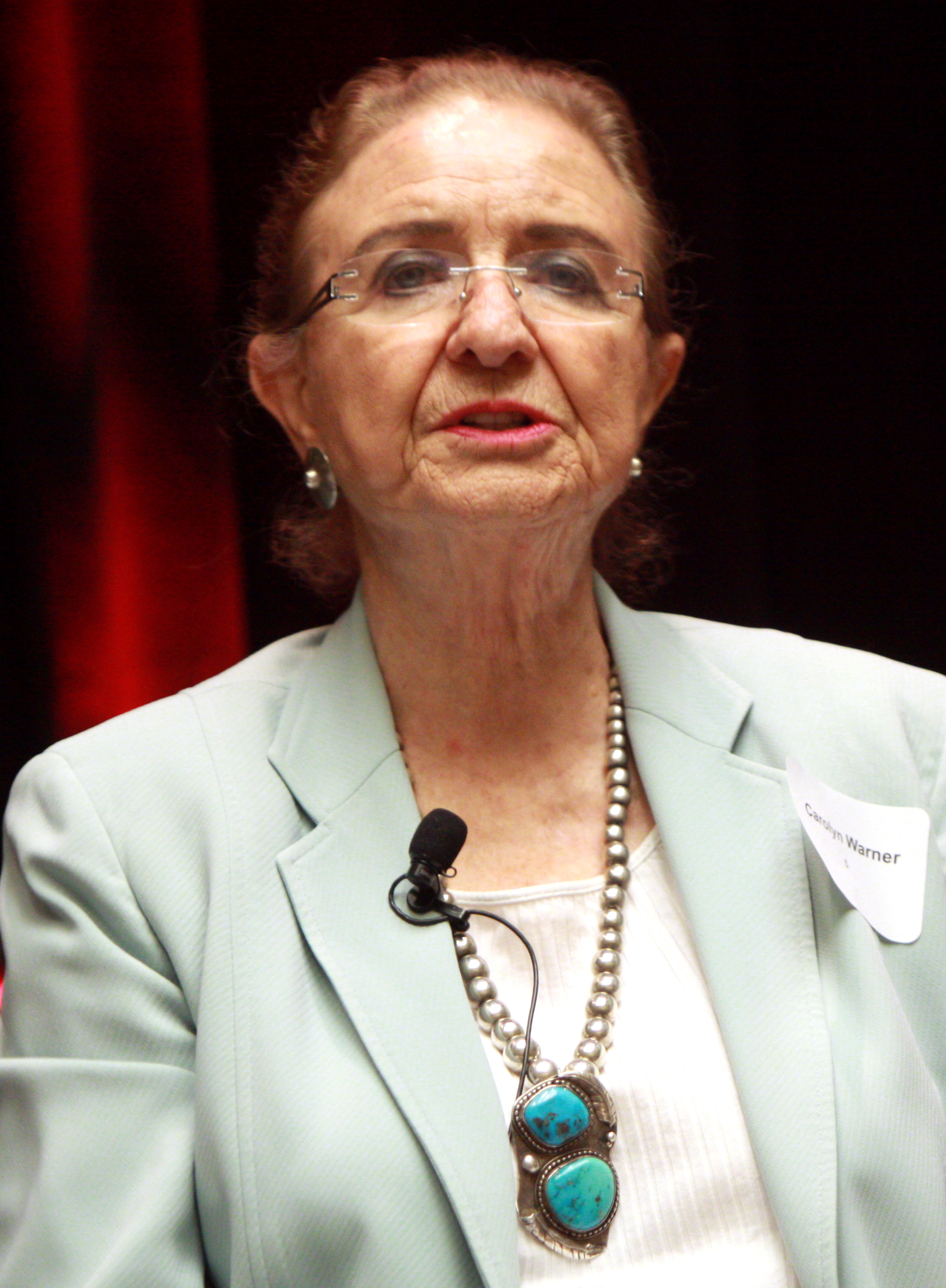

Nominee	Evan Mecham	Carolyn Warner	Bill Schulz
Party	Republican	Democratic	Independent
Popular vote	343,913	298,986	224,085
Percentage	39.67%	34.49%	25.85%
- County results Mecham: 30–40% 40–50% Warner: 40–50% 60–70%
Governor before election
Bruce Babbitt
Democratic
Elected Governor
Evan Mecham
Republican

The 1986 Arizona gubernatorial election took place on November 4, 1986, for the post of Governor of Arizona. Republican Evan Mecham, who defeated Burton Barr for the Republican nomination, defeated the Democratic nominee and State Superintendent Carolyn Warner and independent candidate Bill Schulz.

Mecham's victory in the primary and general elections are considered among the greatest political surprises in Arizona history. Ultimately, Mecham did not complete his full four-year term in office; he was impeached and removed from office in 1988.

This was the first gubernatorial election in which La Paz County participated after separating from Yuma County in between this election and the one just before it.

== Background ==
Bruce Babbitt, who succeed to the office of Governor upon the 1978 death of Wesley Bolin, chose not to run for a third term in office. Babbitt was first elected over Evan Mecham in 1978 and re-elected in a landslide in 1982; some speculated that he would seek to succeed Barry Goldwater in the United States Senate, but Babbitt ultimately focused on a run for President of the United States in 1988.

Although no Republican had been elected Governor of Arizona since 1970, President Ronald Reagan had carried the state with record margins in 1980 and 1984.

== Democratic primary ==
=== Candidates ===
- Tony Mason, candidate for U.S. House in 1976
- Dave Moss, candidate for governor in 1978 and 1982
- Carolyn Warner, Superintendent of Public Instruction

==== Withdrew ====
- Bill Schulz, businessman and Democratic nominee for U.S. Senate in 1980

=== Results ===
Primary results by county Map legend: Warner—50–60%; Warner—40–50%; Mason—50–60%; Mason—40–50%

Democratic primary results
Party	Candidate	Votes	%
Democratic	Carolyn Warner	106,687	50.64%
Democratic	Tony Mason	92,413	43.86%
Democratic	Dave Moss	11,588	5.50%
Total votes		210,688	100.00%

== Republican primary ==
=== Candidates ===
- Burton Barr, House Majority Leader and State Representative from Phoenix
- Evan Mecham, auto dealer and perennial candidate

=== Campaign ===
Barr, who was personally recruited by President Reagan to run for governor and had the universal support of the state Republican establishment, was the heavy favorite. His campaign largely ignored Mecham, who launched negative attacks on Barr and the state party generally. When Republicans responded to Mecham's criticism, such as when the Senate Republican leader called him an "ethical pygmy," his popularity with voters rose.

=== Results ===
Primary results by county Map legend: Mecham—60–70%; Mecham—50–60%; Barr—50–60%

1986 Republican gubernatorial primary
Party	Candidate	Votes	%
Republican	Evan Mecham	121,614	53.74%
Republican	Burton Barr	104,682	46.26%
Total votes		226,296	100.00%

Mecham's primary victory over Barr was received as "the biggest upset in Arizona" since Barry Goldwater's 1952 victory over United States Senator Ernest McFarland.

== General election ==
=== Candidates ===
- Evan Mecham, auto dealer and perennial candidate (Republican)
- Bill Schulz, businessman and Democratic nominee for U.S. Senate in 1980 (Independent)
- Carolyn Warner, Superintendent of Public Instruction (Democratic)

=== Predictions ===
Source	Rating	As of
The Cook Political Report	Toss Up	October 28, 1986

=== Results ===
Arizona gubernatorial election, 1986
Party	Candidate	Votes	%	±%
Republican	Evan Mecham	343,913	39.67%	+7.20%
Democratic	Carolyn Warner	298,986	34.49%	−27.98%
Independent	Bill Schulz	224,085	25.85%	+25.85%
Majority		44,927	5.18%	
Total votes		866,984	100.00%	
Republican gain from Democratic		Swing	+35.18%	

=== Results by county ===
County	Evan Mecham Republican		Carolyn Warner Democratic		Bill Schulz Independent		Margin		Total votes cast
County	#	%	#	%	#	%	#	%	Total votes cast
Apache	2,965	26.52%	6,936	62.04%	1,279	11.44%	-3,971	-35.52%	11,180
Cochise	8,484	38.52%	8,368	37.99%	5,174	23.49%	116	0.53%	22,026
Coconino	6,647	28.04%	11,492	48.48%	5,565	23.48%	-4,845	-20.44%	23,704
Gila	4,779	34.45%	5,775	41.63%	3,319	23.92%	-996	-7.18%	13,873
Graham	3,257	47.13%	2,381	34.46%	1,272	18.41%	876	12.68%	6,910
Greenlee	991	33.24%	1,218	40.86%	772	25.90%	-227	-7.61%	2,981
La Paz	1,352	38.99%	1,201	34.63%	915	26.38%	151	4.35%	3,468
Maricopa	213,049	43.06%	142,540	28.81%	139,231	28.14%	70,509	14.25%	494,820
Mohave	9,333	43.20%	7,969	36.89%	4,300	19.91%	1,364	6.31%	21,602
Navajo	6,250	37.77%	7,527	45.49%	2,769	16.74%	-1,277	-7.72%	16,546
Pima	56,598	32.97%	72,366	42.16%	42,700	24.87%	-15,768	-9.19%	171,664
Pinal	8,244	33.35%	11,127	45.02%	5,347	21.63%	-2,883	-11.66%	24,718
Santa Cruz	1,490	28.10%	2,349	44.30%	1,464	27.61%	-859	-16.20%	5,303
Yavapai	15,000	46.91%	10,288	32.17%	6,688	20.92%	4,712	14.74%	31,976
Yuma	5,474	33.76%	7,449	45.94%	3,290	20.29%	-1,975	-12.18%	16,213
Totals	343,913	39.67%	298,986	34.49%	224,085	25.85%	44,927	5.18%	866,984

==== Counties that flipped from Democratic to Republican ====
- Cochise
- Graham
- Maricopa
- Mohave
- Yavapai
