= 1978 Arizona gubernatorial election =

- November 7, 1978
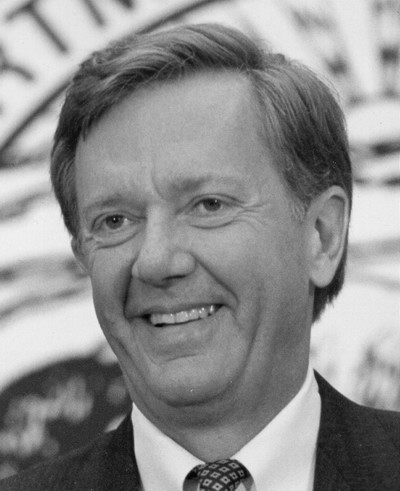

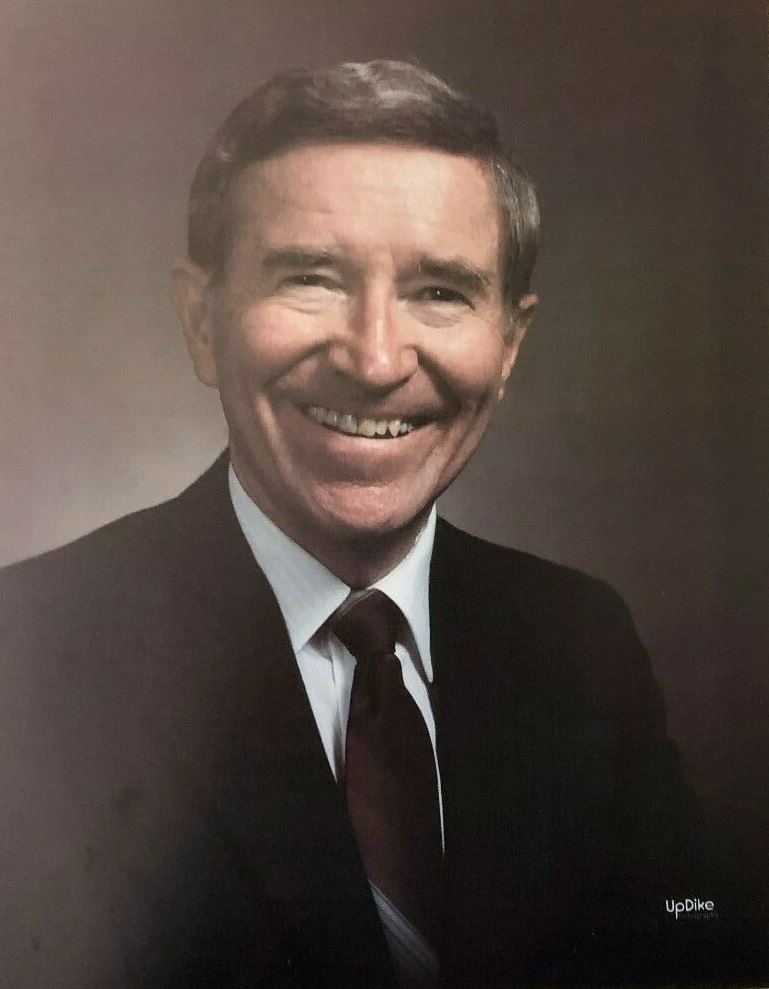
Nominee	Bruce Babbitt	Evan Mecham
Party	Democratic	Republican
Popular vote	282,605	241,093
Percentage	52.47%	44.77%
- County results Babbitt: 50–60% 60–70% Mecham: 40–50% 50–60%
Governor before election
Bruce Babbitt
Democratic
Elected Governor
Bruce Babbitt
Democratic

The 1978 Arizona gubernatorial election took place on November 7, 1978, for the post of Governor of Arizona. Democrat Bruce Babbitt defeated Republican nominee Evan Mecham. Babbitt was the former Attorney General of Arizona, but after the death of Governor Wesley Bolin, Babbit became governor. Bolin himself ascended to office from the position of Secretary of State, meaning his replacement, Rose Mofford was not eligible to the office as she was not elected. This drama of exchanging office would continue after Babbitt's term came to an end, as Mofford would become governor and succeeded Evan Mecham, Babbitt's challenger, in 1988.

== Democratic primary ==
=== Candidates ===
- Bruce Babbitt, incumbent Governor
- Dave Moss, perennial candidate

==== Withdrew ====
- Bill Schulz, businessman (endorsed Babbitt)

=== Results ===
Democratic primary results
Party	Candidate	Votes	%
Democratic	Bruce Babbitt (incumbent)	108,548	76.80%
Democratic	Dave Moss	32,785	23.20%
Total votes		141,333	100.00%

== Republican primary ==
=== Candidates ===
- Charles King
- Jack Londen, businessman
- Evan Mecham, perennial candidate

=== Results ===
Republican primary results
Party	Candidate	Votes	%
Republican	Evan Mecham	50,713	44.07%
Republican	Jack Londen	40,116	34.86%
Republican	Charles King	24,253	21.08%
Total votes		115,082	100.00%

== General election ==
=== Results ===
Arizona gubernatorial election, 1978
Party	Candidate	Votes	%	±%
Democratic	Bruce Babbitt (incumbent)	282,605	52.47%	+2.06%
Republican	Evan Mecham	241,093	44.77%	−4.79%
Libertarian	V. Gene Lewter	10,421	1.93%	+1.93%
Socialist Workers	Jessica Sampson	4,437	0.82%	+0.82%
Majority		41,512	7.71%	
Total votes		538,556	100.00%	
Democratic hold		Swing	+6.86%	

=== Results by county ===
County	Bruce Babbitt Democratic		Evan Mecham Republican		V. Gene Lewter Libertarian		Jessica Sampson Socialist Workers		Margin		Total votes cast
County	#	%	#	%	#	%	#	%	#	%	Total votes cast
Apache	4,498	67.90%	1,761	26.59%	196	2.96%	169	2.55%	2,737	41.32%	6,624
Cochise	8,963	57.96%	6,251	40.42%	94	0.61%	157	1.02%	2,712	17.54%	15,465
Coconino	10,446	67.74%	4,411	28.60%	388	2.52%	176	1.14%	6,035	39.13%	15,421
Gila	5,715	59.39%	3,668	38.12%	160	1.66%	80	0.83%	2,047	21.27%	9,623
Graham	2,565	44.41%	3,085	53.41%	63	1.09%	63	1.09%	-520	-9.00%	5,776
Greenlee	2,229	69.25%	917	28.49%	31	0.96%	42	1.30%	1,312	40.76%	3,219
Maricopa	141,177	46.82%	151,079	50.10%	6,982	2.32%	2,291	0.76%	-9,902	-3.28%	301,529
Mohave	6,042	48.24%	6,133	48.96%	277	2.21%	74	0.59%	-91	-0.73%	12,526
Navajo	6,269	56.47%	4,518	40.70%	179	1.61%	136	1.23%	1,751	15.77%	11,102
Pima	67,904	64.03%	36,197	34.13%	1,165	1.10%	785	0.74%	31,707	29.90%	106,051
Pinal	9,064	54.42%	7,151	42.93%	284	1.70%	158	0.95%	1,913	11.48%	16,657
Santa Cruz	2,814	68.28%	1,229	29.82%	33	0.80%	45	1.09%	1,585	38.46%	4,121
Yavapai	8,386	46.85%	8,978	50.16%	408	2.28%	126	0.70%	-592	-3.31%	17,898
Yuma	6,533	52.08%	5,715	45.56%	161	1.28%	135	1.08%	818	6.52%	12,544
Totals	282,605	52.47%	241,093	44.77%	10,421	1.93%	4,437	0.82%	41,512	7.71%	538,556

==== Counties that flipped from Republican to Democratic ====
- Yuma

==== Counties that flipped from Democratic to Republican ====
- Mohave
