= 1980 United States Senate election in Arizona =

- November 4, 1980
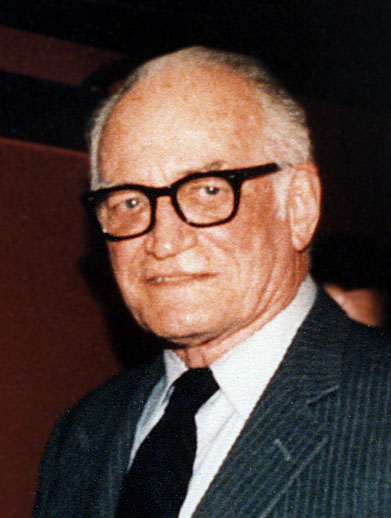

Nominee	Barry Goldwater	Bill Schulz
Party	Republican	Democratic
Popular vote	432,371	422,972
Percentage	49.46%	48.38%
- County results Goldwater: 40–50% 50–60% Schulz: 40–50% 50–60% 60–70%
U.S. senator before election
Barry Goldwater
Republican
Elected U.S. Senator
Barry Goldwater
Republican

The 1980 United States Senate election in Arizona took place on November 4, 1980. Republican incumbent Barry Goldwater ran for reelection to a fifth (and third consecutive (Note: Goldwater was first elected to the Senate in 1952 and served two terms before retiring to run for president in 1964. After losing the presidential election, he was again elected to the Senate in 1968 and re-elected in 1974.)) term in office and narrowly defeated businessman Bill Schulz. Despite Ronald Reagan's landslide win in Arizona, Goldwater only won by slightly more than one percent of the total vote and carried only three counties, including Maricopa.

== Republican primary ==
=== Candidates ===
- Barry Goldwater, incumbent U.S. senator since 1969 and 1964 presidential nominee

== Democratic primary ==
=== Candidates ===
- Frank DePaoli
- James F. McNulty Jr., state senator
- Frances Morgan
- Bill Schulz, businessman

=== Results ===
Democratic primary results
Party	Candidate	Votes	%
Democratic	Bill Schulz	97,520	55.4%
Democratic	James F. McNulty, Jr.	58,894	33.4%
Democratic	Frank DePaoli	19,259	10.9%
Democratic	Frances Morgan (withdrawn)	485	0.3%
Total votes		176,158	100.0

== General election ==
=== Candidates ===
- Fred R. Esser (Libertarian)
- Barry Goldwater, incumbent U.S. senator since 1969 and 1964 presidential nominee (Republican)
- Josefina Otero (Socialist Workers)
- Bill Schulz, businessman (Democratic)
- Lorenzo Torrez (People Before Profits)

=== Results ===
1980 United States Senate election in Arizona
Party	Candidate	Votes	%	±%
Republican	Barry Goldwater (incumbent)	432,371	49.46%	−8.80%
Democratic	Bill Schulz	422,972	48.38%	+6.64%
Libertarian	Fred R. Esser	12,008	1.37%	
Independent	Lorenzo Torrez	3,608	0.41%	
Socialist Workers	Josefina Otero	3,266	0.37%	
Majority		9,399	1.08%	−15.44%
Turnout		874,225		
Republican hold		Swing		

== See also ==
- 1980 United States Senate elections
