= Carolyn Warner =

American politician (1930–2018)

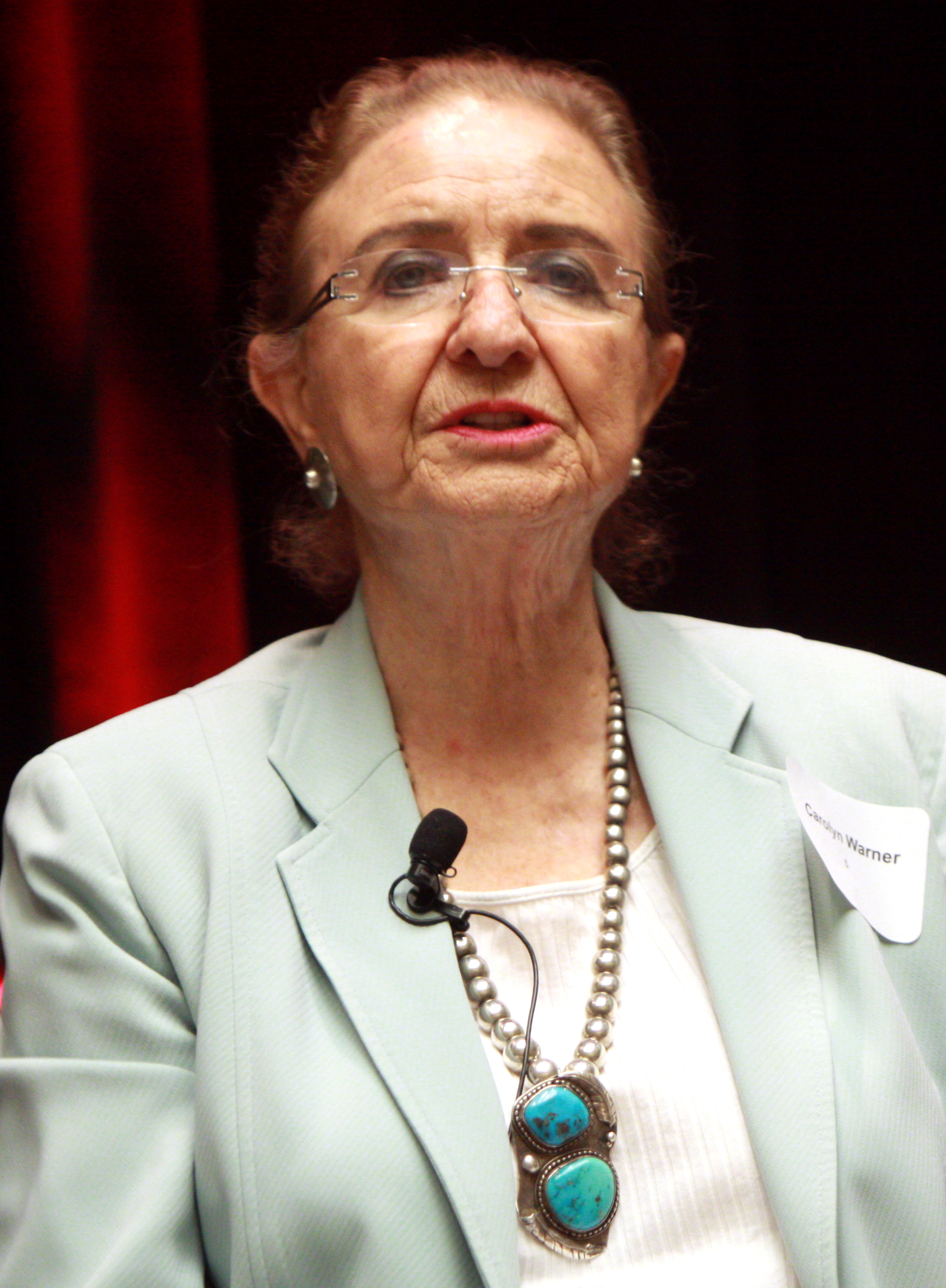

Arizona Superintendent of Public Instruction
- In office January 6, 1975 – January 5, 1987
- Governor: Raúl Castro; Wesley Bolin; Bruce Babbitt
- Preceded by: Weldon Shofstall
- Succeeded by: C. Diane Bishop

Personal details
- Born: Carolyn Rexroat; August 2, 1930 Ardmore, Oklahoma, U.S.
- Died: October 9, 2018 (aged 88) Paradise Valley, Arizona, U.S.
- Party: Democratic
- Education: University of Oklahoma (attended); Stephens College (BA)

Carolyn Rexroat Warner (August 2, 1930 – October 9, 2018) was an American politician who served as the 15th Superintendent of Public Instruction for the state of Arizona, elected as a Democrat, from 1975 to 1987. Warner was the Democratic nominee for Governor of Arizona in 1986, but was defeated by former state senator Evan Mecham, who would go on to be impeached and removed from office by the Arizona legislature.

In addition to running for governor, Warner also ran for the United States Senate in 1976, but lost the primary, and was elected Democratic National Committeewoman for Arizona in 2004 and 2008. Warner ran a consulting firm called Corporate Education Consulting after leaving public office.

== Early life ==
Carolyn Warner was born in Ardmore, Oklahoma, to Democratic State Senator Uriah Thomas Rexroat and Mary Tullis. In her youth, Warner attended the inauguration of Harry S. Truman, and danced with the President at one of his Inaugural balls.

== Political career ==
Warner began her political career by speaking at events for political candidates such as Governor of Oklahoma Roy J. Turner, and Senators Elmer Thomas and Robert S. Kerr when she was 13 years old.

Warner moved to Arizona, and became active in politics after raising six children and helping to run her family's business for 20 years. She first ran for the office of Arizona Superintendent of Public Instruction, and was elected to her first term as Superintendent in 1974, and took office in 1975. She would be reelected twice more, in 1978 and 1982.

Warner ran in the Democratic primary for United States Senate in 1976, but lost to Pima County, Arizona Attorney Dennis DeConcini.

Warner was the Democratic nominee for Governor of Arizona in 1986, but was defeated by then-State Senator Evan Mecham, who would go on to be impeached from office.

In 1998, Warner received an honorary Doctorate from Northern Arizona University "in recognition of her service to education and the community." Warner was a Congressional appointee to the National Skills Standards Board and was a delegate to the White House Conference on Small Business. She was elected as Democratic National Committeewoman for Arizona in 2004 and 2008. Warner was super-delegate for Hillary Clinton in 2016.

== Later career ==
Since leaving public office, Warner has remained active in party politics, in addition to running an education consulting firm called Corporate Education Consulting, Inc. She is also the author of four books.

Warner died of cancer on October 9, 2018, at the age of 88 at her home in Paradise Valley, Arizona.

Party political offices
Preceded by Bruce Babbitt	Democratic nominee for Governor of Arizona; 1986	Succeeded by Terry Goddard
