= Burton Barr =

American politician (1917–1997)

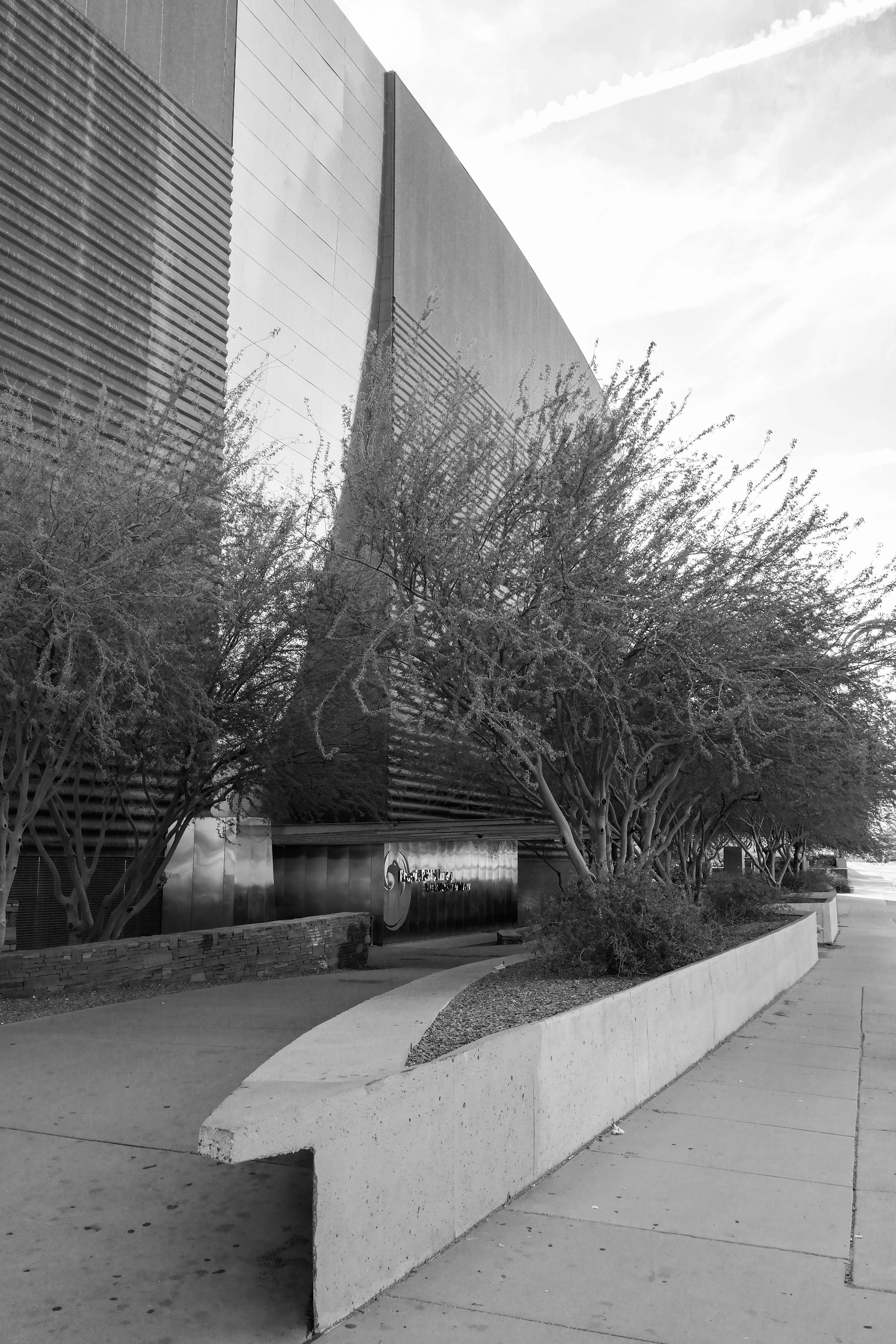
- The Burton Barr Central Library in Phoenix, Arizona
- Born: 1917
- Died: January 13, 1997 (aged 79–80)
- Occupations: Businessman, politician
- Title: Colonel
- Political party: Republican Party

Burton Barr (1917–1997) was an American Army colonel, businessman and politician. He served as a Republican member of the Arizona House of Representatives from 1964 to 1986, and as its Republican Majority Leader from 1966 to 1986.

== Biography ==
=== Early life ===
Burton S. Barr was born in 1917.

=== Career ===
During World War II, he served in the United States Army in North Africa, Italy, France, and Germany. He received the two Silver Stars and one Bronze Star for his service. He became a lieutenant colonel in 1946 and a colonel in 1964, when he resigned from the army. During his service in World War II, Barr commanded three men who won the Medal of Honor, one of them being Audie Murphy.

In 1964, he was elected as a Republican member of the Arizona House of Representatives, representing District 18, where he served until 1986. Additionally, he served as the Republican Majority Leader in the House from 1966 to 1986. In 1986, he ran unsuccessfully for Governor of Arizona, losing the Republican primary to Evan Mecham. He was defeated after he voted for a tax increase after saying he would vote against it, that was followed by a press conference where he was asked why he said he was going to vote against the tax increase, Barr said, "I lied. Next question." Barr was known as one of the most effective political leaders in state history. His colleagues in the legislature referred to him as "Mister Magic". Barr helped pass legislation promoting such things as vehicle inspections, health care, education, prison reform, child care, and freeway funding.

=== Death ===
He died on January 13, 1997.

== Legacy ==
- The Burton Barr Central Library in Phoenix, Arizona, was named in his honor.
- The Burton S. Barr Memorial Scholarship at Arizona State University was also named in his honor.

== Secondary source ==
- Philip R. VanderMeer. Burton Barr: Political Leadership and the Transformation of Arizona. Tucson, Arizona: The University of Arizona Press. 2014.
