= Evan Mecham =

American politician (1924–2008)

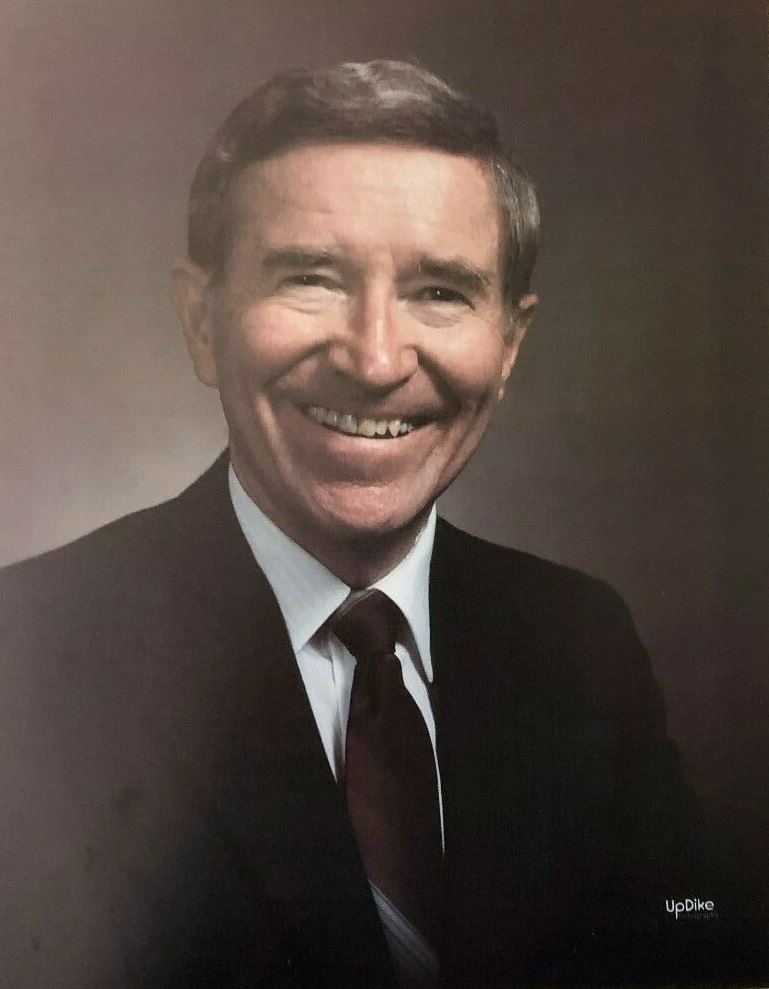
- Mecham, c. 1987

17th Governor of Arizona
- In office January 5, 1987 – April 4, 1988
- Preceded by: Bruce Babbitt
- Succeeded by: Rose Mofford

Member of the Arizona Senate from the Maricopa County district
- In office 1961–1963 Serving with Joe Haldiman
- Preceded by: Hilliard Brooke; Frank Murphy
- Succeeded by: Hilliard Brooke; Paul Singer

Personal details
- Born: May 12, 1924 Mountain Home, Utah, U.S.
- Died: February 21, 2008 (aged 83) Phoenix, Arizona, U.S.
- Resting place: National Memorial Cemetery of Arizona
- Party: Republican (before 1992); Independent (1992–2008)
- Spouse: Florence Lambert (m. 1945)
- Children: 7

Military service
- Allegiance: United States
- Branch/service: United States Army
- Years of service: 1943–1945
- Rank: Second Lieutenant
- Unit: U.S. Army Air Forces
- Battles/wars: World War II • European–African–Middle Eastern Campaign (POW)
- Awards: Purple Heart; Air Medal

Evan Mecham (/ˈmiːkəm/ MEE-kəm; May 12, 1924 – February 21, 2008) was an American businessman and the 17th governor of Arizona, serving from January 5, 1987, until his impeachment conviction on April 4, 1988. A decorated veteran of World War II, Mecham was an automotive dealership owner and occasional newspaper publisher.

Periodic runs for political office earned him a reputation as a perennial candidate along with the nickname of "The Harold Stassen of Arizona" before he was elected governor, under the Republican banner. As governor, Mecham was plagued by controversy almost immediately after his inauguration and became the first U.S. governor to simultaneously face removal from office through impeachment, a scheduled recall election, and a felony indictment. He is the only Arizona governor to be impeached, as well as one of only 15 U.S. governors to be impeached.

Mecham served one term as a state senator before beginning a string of unsuccessful runs for public office. His victory during the 1986 election began with a surprise win of the Republican nomination, followed by a split of the Democratic party during the general election, resulting in a three-way race. While Governor, Mecham made statements and actions that were widely perceived as racially charged or racist. Among these actions were the cancellation of the state's paid Martin Luther King Jr. Day and creating an unpaid King holiday on a Sunday, attributing high divorce rates to working women, and his defense of the word "pickaninny" in describing African American children. In reaction to these events, a boycott of Arizona was organized. A rift between the Governor and fellow Republicans in the Arizona Legislature developed after The Arizona Republic newspaper made accusations of questionable political appointments and cronyism.

Having served from January 5, 1987, to April 4, 1988, Mecham was removed from office following conviction in his impeachment trial on charges of obstruction of justice and misuse of government funds—funds that Mecham maintained were private. A later criminal trial acquitted Mecham of related charges. Following his removal from office, Mecham remained active in politics for nearly a decade. During this time, he served as a delegate to the Republican National Convention and made his final runs for the Arizona governorship and also for the U.S. Senate, in which he unsuccessfully challenged John McCain as an independent.

== Early life and business career ==
Evan Mecham was born to parents who were members of the Church of Jesus Christ of Latter-day Saints in Mountain Home, Utah, and raised on his family's farm. The youngest of five boys, with one younger sister, he graduated as salutatorian from Altamont High School in 1942 and enrolled in Utah State Agricultural College on an agricultural scholarship. Mecham left college and joined the U.S. Army Air Corps in January 1943. He was trained as a P-38 Lightning fighter pilot before being transferred to England, where he flew P-51 Mustangs. Mecham was shot down on March 7, 1945, while flying escort on a photo reconnaissance mission and was held as a prisoner of war for 22 days. Mecham returned to the United States after recovering from injuries sustained in the lead-up to his capture, and received an Air Medal and Purple Heart for his service. Mecham married Florence Lambert in May 1945 and was discharged in December of the same year. Together, the couple raised seven children: Suzanne, Dennis, Christine, Eric, Teresa, Kyle and Lance.

Mecham was an active member of the Church of Jesus Christ of Latter-day Saints. He taught Sunday school and served as a bishop in the LDS church from 1957 to 1961. Part of his faith was that God would guide his actions and provide him the strength needed to endure. These beliefs were in part demonstrated during his time as governor when one staff member reported hearing a conversation in Mecham's office before entering the room to find the Governor alone. Another staff member, Donna Carlson, reported that Mecham believed he had obtained office by divine right and was thus not overly concerned about the feelings of others.

Mecham enrolled at Arizona State College in 1947 and majored in management and economics. In 1950, he left school 16 credit hours short of a degree to start Mecham Pontiac and Rambler in Ajo. Mecham relocated to Glendale in 1954 where he acquired and operated a Pontiac dealership until he sold it in March 1988. As a dealer, he appeared regularly in local television commercials and adopted his trademark motto of "If you can't deal with Mecham, you just can't deal." The Glendale dealership served as a base for other family-owned businesses, including Mecham Racing, Hauahaupan Mining Company and several auto dealerships in other states.

In addition to his auto dealership, Mecham owned several short-lived newspapers. One of his papers, the Evening American, was printed as a Phoenix daily with maximum circulation of 27,000 before becoming a weekly journal. As a newspaper publisher trying to break into the Phoenix and Tucson markets, Mecham testified before the U.S. Senate Antitrust and Monopoly subcommittee on July 13, 1967. This testimony was in response to a bill sponsored by U.S. Senator Carl Hayden that provided partial immunity from the Sherman Antitrust Act, allowing an economically healthy newspaper and one that was failing to form a joint venture combining advertising, printing, and distribution operations while maintaining separate reporting and editorial functions. While supporters of the bill claimed it would prevent newspaper failures, Mecham opposed the bill claiming "The major reason that this bill has been presented is because of the power of the press over the decisions of voters at the polls, and the desire of politicians to court the favor of those who control these monopolistic presses." He also added that "the tools of monopoly are in the common advertising and the common circulation department."

== Political career ==
Mecham first sought elected office in 1952, while still living in Ajo, with an unsuccessful run for the Arizona House of Representatives. After moving to Glendale, Mecham used the recognition gained from his television appearances to be elected to the Arizona Senate during the 1960 election. After one term as a state senator, in 1962 Mecham attempted to capture the U.S. Senate seat held by Carl Hayden, running on a platform demanding the United States withdraw from the United Nations and critical of a U.S. Supreme Court ruling limiting school prayer. The campaign first saw Mecham win a victory in the Republican primary over Stephen Shadegg, a former campaign manager for Barry Goldwater. Goldwater remained neutral. In the general election, Mecham received only tepid support from his party because of the value of Hayden's Senate seniority in passing legislation for the proposed Central Arizona Project. Mecham was defeated in the general election but still polled 45 percent of the vote.

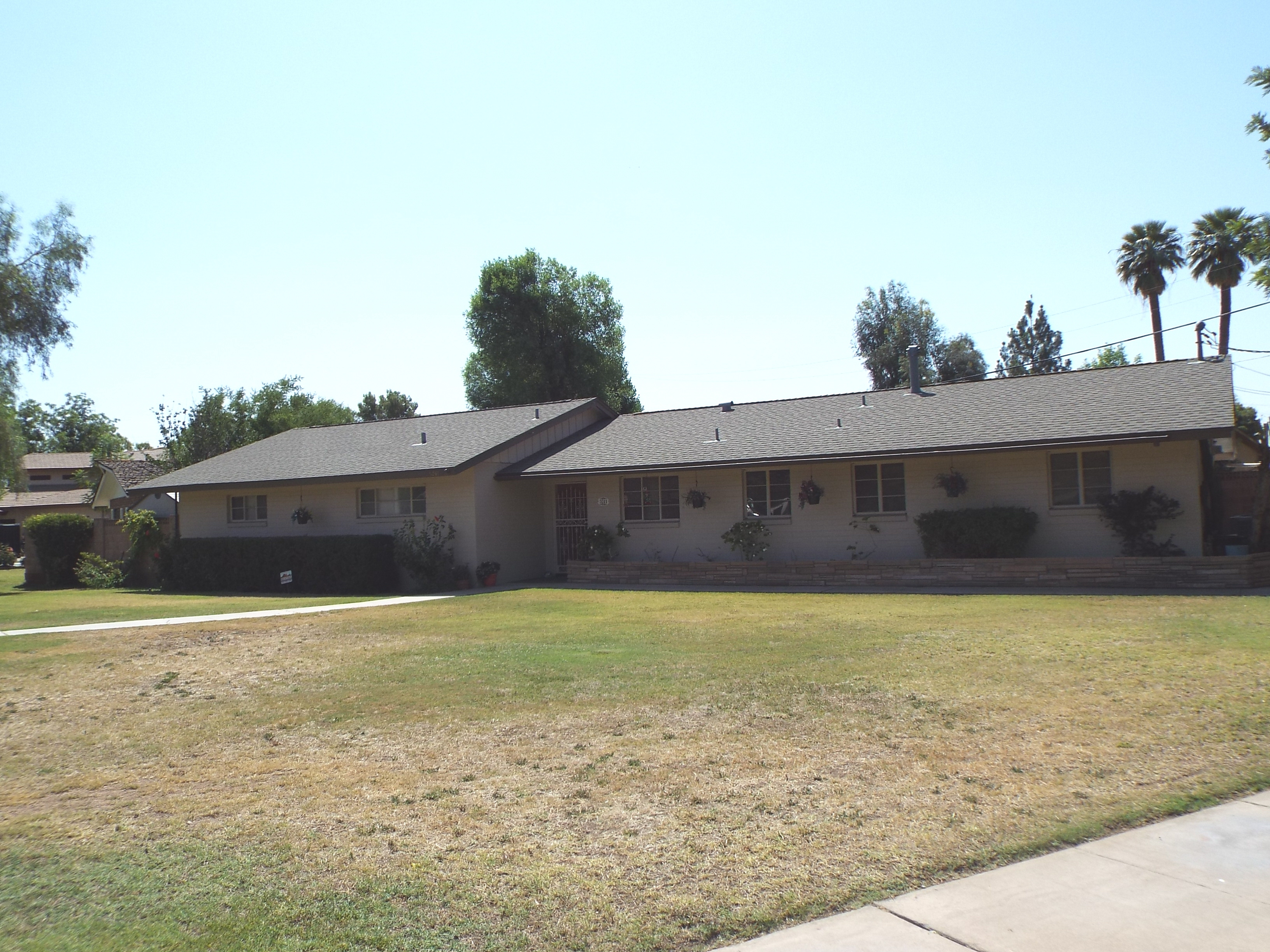
Evan Mecham's house located at 5741 West Harmont Drive in Glendale

Following his campaign against Hayden, Mecham made an unsuccessful run for state chairman of the Republican party in 1963 and unsuccessful runs for governor of Arizona in 1964, 1974, 1978, and 1982. In these four runs, Mecham gained the Republican nomination only for the 1978 election. He developed a political doctrine supporting Jeffersonian democracy and advocating elimination of income taxes, return of federal lands to state control, removing federal involvement in education, and putting welfare under state control. In 1982, Mecham wrote his first book, Come Back America, in which he discusses his earlier life and political views.

In his fifth try for governor, Mecham ran as a political outsider using his standard platform advocating political reform and tax relief. Mecham's opponent in the Republican primary, Burton Barr, had served as the Majority Leader of the Arizona House of Representatives. Barr had the support of the state GOP leadership, including Barry Goldwater and John McCain. Mecham's core support came from fellow Mormons and the ultraconservative John Birch Society. A sizable portion of the state's retired population joined this core support with Mecham's promises of tax cuts. Because of Arizona's substantial transient population—only about half of the registered voters in 1986 were living in the state in 1980—Mecham's record of previous attempts to gain elected office was not widely known by the voters. The primary election also saw the lowest voter turnout in nearly forty years due to unusual rain. Mecham overcame a fifteen-point deficit in the polls to win the Republican nomination with 54% of the vote. Barr failed to spend much of his campaign war chest in the primary, ending his campaign with over a million dollars on hand.

The general election of 1986 saw a three-way race for governor. The Democratic Party had selected the state Superintendent of Public Education, Carolyn Warner, as its candidate. Dissatisfaction among the state's business and political leadership with both candidates allowed Bill Schulz, a real estate developer and Democrat who had withdrawn from the Democratic primary because of a family illness, to obtain enough petition signatures to run as an independent candidate. Six years earlier, Schulz had nearly defeated longtime U.S. Senator Barry Goldwater. Goldwater was slow to endorse Mecham in this race, but did so officially at a dinner in Lake Havasu City. During the campaign, the state Automobile Dealers Association's ethics committee placed Mecham's dealership on probation for being chronically tardy in responding to complaints. The Democratic split caused by Schulz's re-entry allowed Mecham's campaign to survive. Mecham won the election with a 40% plurality while Warner and Schulz received 34% and 26% respectively.

== Governorship ==
Mecham was inaugurated on January 5, 1987. Among his claimed successes were the opening of a trade office in Taiwan that allowed for a $63 million cotton export contract and strengthening drug abuse prevention efforts through legislation allowing the governor to appoint pro tempore judges to deal with drug-related issues. The governor also spearheaded an effort within the National Governors Association to raise the speed limit on rural highways from 55 mph (90 km/h) to 65 mph (105 km/h) and supported a legislative bill to prevent takeover of Arizona businesses. During Mecham's term of office, a $157 million budget deficit was eliminated by reductions in state spending.

=== Martin Luther King Jr. Day ===
Mecham gained national attention several days after his inauguration by fulfilling a campaign promise to cancel a paid Martin Luther King, Jr. Day holiday (MLK Day) for state employees. The holiday had been created in May 1986 by executive order from the previous governor, Bruce Babbitt, after the state legislature had voted not to create the holiday. Following the creation of the holiday, the state Attorney General's office issued an opinion that the paid holiday was illegal and threatened to sue the incoming governor over the cost of the paid holiday, as it had not been approved by the legislature. Despite the issues of the legality of how the holiday was created, Mecham replied to comments from civil rights activists and the Black community after the cancellation by saying "King doesn't deserve a holiday." This was followed by him telling a group of Black community leaders, "You folks don't need another holiday. What you folks need are jobs."

In reaction to the cancellation, a protest march to the state capital was held on January 19, 1987, the day the holiday would have occurred. Conventions scheduled to be held in Arizona were canceled, and performer Stevie Wonder and writer Harlan Ellison separately announced that they would boycott the state. The rap group Public Enemy released a song in regard to the cancellation of the MLK holiday titled "By the Time I Get to Arizona"; in the video for the song, the group was seen assassinating Mecham by planting a bomb underneath his limousine and detonating it by remote control. The rock band U2, which performed a concert at Arizona State University (ASU) in Tempe in early April 1987, joined in with the chorus of condemnation of Mecham, publicly announcing that they had donated money to the impeachment campaign, and having him denounced from the stage by a spokesman to their audience and the attending press, television, and radio outlets.

After several months of criticism, Mecham declared a non-paid holiday on the third Sunday in January. Reaction in the state to the non-paid holiday was generally poor.

=== Relations with legislature ===
Although both houses of the state legislature were controlled by fellow Republicans, Mecham was on poor terms with state lawmakers. He repeatedly asserted that he was under no obligation to cooperate with the legislature, that he was answerable only to the United States Constitution—which, he believed, had been divinely inspired. Several of Mecham's appointments to key executive positions—submitted without consultation with legislative leaders—were found to have highly questionable credentials. Examples included his choice to head the Department of Liquor Licenses and Control, who was under investigation for murder; the director of the Department of Revenue, whose company was in arrears by $25,000 on employment compensation payments; the proposed supervisor of prison construction, who had served prison time for armed robbery; and a former Marine, nominated as a state investigator, who had been court-martialled twice. Other political appointees who caused Mecham embarrassment were an education adviser, James Cooper, who told a legislative committee, "If a student wants to say the world is flat, the teacher doesn't have the right to prove otherwise"; and Sam Steiger, Mecham's special assistant, who was charged with extortion.

Mecham's legislative initiatives suffered due to his poor relations with the legislature. His proposal to cut the state's sales tax by one percentage point—a key campaign promise—failed, largely because Mecham did not specify which programs would lose funding, thus preventing lawmakers from determining how their constituencies would be affected. His proposed $2.3 billion budget, which cut education funding and froze state employee salaries, was increased by $200 million by the legislature. Mecham lost further support by vetoing bills sponsored by key legislators, such as Senate Majority Leader Bob Usdane. "I'd say that the cooperation was not great", Usdane said, "but it's his prerogative". House Majority Leader Jim Ratliff, who had previously been a Mecham supporter, was a veto victim as well. "My only message to the governor is, if he thinks that people advising him to veto [my bill] can help him run the state of Arizona better than I can, then let them", he said in a statement.

=== Other incidents ===
Besides the uproar caused by the MLK Day cancellation, claims of prejudice were made against Mecham after he defended the use of the racist word "pickaninny" to describe black children, claimed that high divorce rates were caused by working women, claimed America is a Christian nation to a Jewish audience, and said a group of visiting Japanese businessmen got "round eyes" after being told of the number of golf courses in Arizona. In response to claims that he was a racist, Mecham said, "I've got black friends. I employ black people. I don't employ them because they are black; I employ them because they are the best people who applied for the cotton-picking job." These and other statements only strengthened the allegations of racism made against the governor following the MLK day cancellation.

Mecham made an issue of his relationship with the press. Claiming that many of his problems were caused by media enemies he had made during previous runs for political office, the governor stated, "The Phoenix newspaper monopoly has had my political destruction as its goal for many years." The governor also claimed, "Every daily newspaper in the state endorsed a different candidate besides me. It's taking them a little time to get used to the idea that I was the people's choice." In response to his perceived mistreatment by the press, Mecham attempted to ban a journalist from his press conferences. John Kolbe, a political columnist for the Phoenix Gazette and brother of Congressman Jim Kolbe, was declared a "non-person" after a February 25, 1987, column critical of Mecham's performance at the National Governors Association. The Governor then refused to acknowledge the presence of the columnist or answer his questions at a press conference. Mecham left the conference after other reporters repeated Kolbe's questions. Another incident occurred during a televised event in which a reporter questioned the governor's integrity, prompting Mecham to reply, "Don't you ever ask me for a true statement again." Mecham's press secretary Ken Smith later argued that the press "largely misunderstood" Mecham's retort. "Of course, the governor should not have said that, especially with the TV cameras rolling," he wrote. "In that heated context, what Mecham was telling Sam Stanton was not to challenge his honesty and integrity. Mecham often said the wrong thing, but he never lied."

In 1987, a reporter for the Phoenix Gazette asked Mecham about the use of the word "pickaninny" in The Making of America, a book by Mecham's mentor W. Cleon Skousen. Mecham defended the use of the word, saying, "As I was a boy growing up, blacks themselves referred to their children as pickaninnies. That was never intended to be an ethnic slur to anybody." This quote sparked national attention, in response to which Mecham again defended the use of the term "in a historical sense". Mecham's administration afterward became associated with the term "pickaninny". The same year, Doonesbury began a six strip series of comics lampooning the governor. The first strip depicted Mecham saying, "My! What a cute little pickaninny!" while patting the head of a black child. Other strips satirized Mecham's tolerance of others, political appointments, and the state's loss of tourism business. For a short time, Mecham considered suing the strip's creator, but later said he had decided to leave the dispute "where it belongs—the funny pages." In the midst of the scandal, Governor Mecham telephoned Arizona Republic political cartoonist Steve Benson, who would later win a Pulitzer Prize in 1993, and told him to stop drawing critical cartoons about him, or his eternal soul would be in jeopardy.

Throughout his administration, Mecham expressed concern about possible eavesdropping on his private communications. A senior member of Mecham's staff broke his leg after falling through a false ceiling he had been crawling over, looking for covert listening devices. A private investigator was hired to sweep the governor's offices looking for bugs. The Governor was quoted as saying, "Whenever I'm in my house or my office, I always have a radio on. It keeps the lasers out." After this was reported, a political cartoon by Benson appeared in the Arizona Republic depicting the governor leaving his house outfitted for laser tag. When asked about this by reporters, Attorney General Bob Corbin replied in amusement, "We don't have any ray gun pointed at him."

=== Economic impact ===
Publicity over Mecham's faux pas led to the state experiencing adverse economic effects. Tourism suffered when groups and conventions transferred their meetings out of Arizona. In November 1987, a Phoenix-area convention bureau claimed that Mecham's policies on Martin Luther King Day had caused the cancellation of 45 conventions worth over $25 million (~$60.7 million in 2025). One of these cancellations was a National Basketball Association convention in Phoenix. In response to the cancellation, Mecham was quoted to say "Well, the N.B.A. I guess they forget how many white people they get coming to watch them play."

Public perception of Mecham also slowed down economic development outside the tourism industry. Several corporations looking for locations to build new facilities, including US West and SEMATECH, expressed concern that the governor's statements might indicate problems in the local business climate. The executive director of the Phoenix Economic Growth Corporation, Ioanna T. Morfessis, stated "When companies look at a state's environment they don't want anything that sounds to them like the state isn't working right." As the controversy surrounding the governor built even the business interests within the state abandoned support for him. As the chairman of the state chamber of commerce, William L. Raby, observed "We usually back Republicans, but he's a different kind of Republican."

== Removal efforts ==
While criticism plagued Governor Mecham for most of his time in office, it was not until he had been in office for six months that his nominal allies began to break ranks with him. In July 1987, the same month the recall effort officially began, a group of thirteen rank-and-file Republican members of the state legislature met to discuss the governor's image problems. Eleven members of the group, dubbed the Dirty Dozen by the local press, issued a joint statement critical of many of the governor's efforts. Calls for the governor's resignation followed several months afterwards, with former U.S. Senator Barry Goldwater leading the way on October 9, 1987. As Mecham's problems continued to build, other Arizona political leaders, including Congressman Jon Kyl and Senator John McCain, made appeals for Mecham to step down, but the governor steadfastly refused to leave office.

=== Recall drive ===
The Mecham Watchdog Committee was organized in January 1987 and changed its name to the Mecham Recall Committee in May 1987. Pursuant to the Arizona Constitution, a recall petition may not be circulated against an official unless he has been in office for at least six months, except that a legislator may be recalled after he has been in office for five days. These petitions needed a number of signatures equal to 25% of votes cast during the official's last election to cause a recall election. On July 6, 1987, the first day that petitions could be circulated, the recall committee began an effort to collect 350,000 signatures, significantly more than the 216,746 signatures required. The recall committee was led by Ed Buck, a registered Republican and gay businessman living in the Phoenix area. In response, Mecham claimed the recall supporters were "a band of homosexuals and dissident Democrats." Mecham supporters printed bumper stickers reading "Queer Ed Buck's Recall" after learning of the recall leader's sexual orientation. Mecham also mailed 25,000 letters during September to conservatives nationwide requesting that they move to Arizona and support him in case a recall election were held.

The recall tended to gather signatures in bursts, with most signatures occurring shortly after some action of the governor offended a segment of the state's voters. Anger toward the governor grew to the point that on August 15, Mecham's appearance at Sun Devil Stadium before an exhibition NFL game resulted in cries of "Recall! Recall!" combined with catcalls. By mid-September, signatures in excess of the minimum required had been collected at roadside locations despite the 115 °F (46 °C) afternoon heat of the Arizona summer. Signature collection continued for the full 120-day period allowed for by state law. On November 2, the recall committee turned in 32,401 petitions containing 388,988 signatures (more than the 343,913 votes Mecham had received during his election). After the Secretary of State's office received the petitions, Mecham refused to waive verification of the signatures, forcing the petitions to be sent to the counties for verification. On January 26, 1988, Secretary of State Rose Mofford reported to Mecham that 301,032 signatures had been verified—a quantity sufficient to force a recall election. A recall election was scheduled for May 17, 1988, and former Republican Congressman John Rhodes agreed to run against Mecham.

=== Impeachment and removal ===
On October 21, 1987, the Arizona Republic ran a story claiming that Mecham had failed to report a $350,000 loan from local real-estate developer Barry Wolfson to Mecham's election campaign as required by campaign financing laws. These claims were added to a grand jury investigation into allegations that Mecham had loaned $80,000 in public funds to help his auto dealership. Upon learning of the alleged Wolfson loan, the Speaker of the state House of Representatives hired a special counsel to investigate the charges. The third and final impeachment charge involved an alleged death threat to a government official by Horace Lee Watkins, a Mecham appointee, in November 1987. When Mecham was informed of the threat, it was reported that he instructed the head of the Arizona Department of Public Safety (DPS) not to provide information on the incident to the attorney general.

On January 8, 1988, a grand jury issued indictments against Evan Mecham and Willard Mecham, the Governor's brother and campaign finance manager, charging three counts of perjury, two counts of fraud, and one count of failing to report a campaign contribution. Mecham and his brother faced 22 years in prison if convicted on all charges.

The special counsel appointed by the Speaker of the House delivered his report to the House on January 15. Based on this report, the House began hearings into possible impeachment proceedings on January 19. These resulted in the passing of House Resolution 2002 on February 8 by a vote of 46 to 14. Upon Mecham's impeachment by the House, his powers as governor were suspended and Mofford became acting governor. Arizona had no lieutenant governor at the time (the office of lieutenant governor was implemented after the 2022 gubernatorial election but would not be filled until 2026), so the secretary of state stood first in the order of succession if he or she had been popularly elected.

The Arizona State Senate convened as a court of impeachment on February 29. Mecham's supporters compared the impeachment trial to the crucifixion of Jesus Christ. The charges against Mecham in the impeachment trial were obstruction of justice, filing a false statement, and misuse of government funds. The false filings charge was dropped by the Senate on a vote of 16 to 12. Arguably, the testimony most damaging to Mecham was his own, during which he repeated his assertion that the legislature had no authority over him, and berated individual legislators. On April 4, the Senate convicted Mecham on obstruction of justice by a vote of 21 to 9, and on misusing government funds by a vote of 26 to 4. The Senate then voted 17 to 12 to disqualify Mecham from holding state office again, but that was short of the two-thirds majority required for passage. Upon conviction, Mecham was removed from office and Mofford immediately became governor of Arizona. The recall election was canceled by the Arizona Supreme Court in a 4 to 1 ruling that the constitutionally mandated order of succession took precedence over the state's recall provisions.

=== Criminal acquittal ===
The criminal case against Mecham and his brother went to trial on June 2, 1988. Attorneys who analyzed the proceedings later concluded that the Mechams' lawyers' most successful strategy was keeping their clients off the witness stand. The jury found that prosecutors failed to prove that the Mechams knowingly erred on their campaign reports, and acquitted the brothers on all six felony charges on June 10, 1988.

== Later life and legacy ==
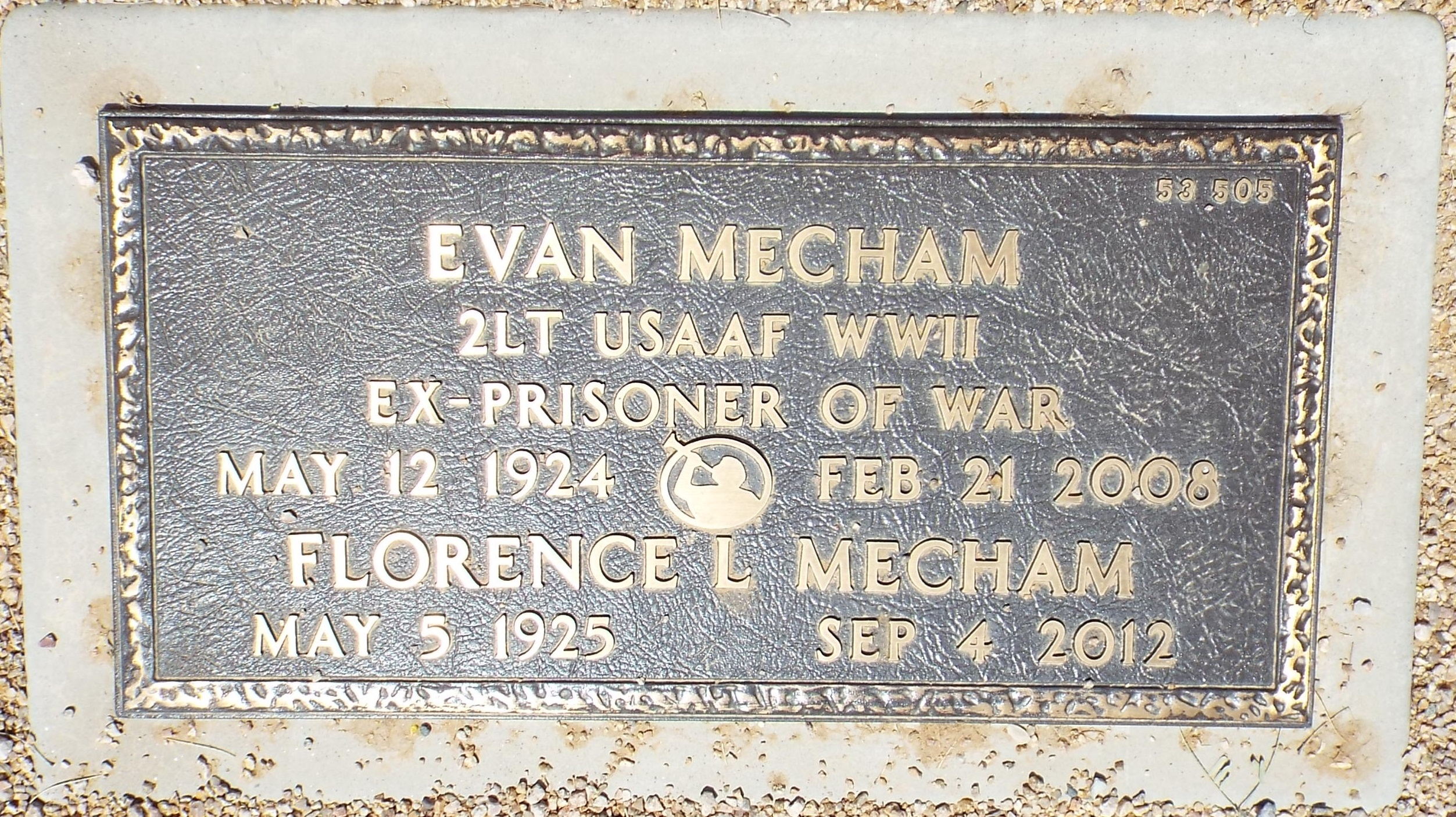
Grave site of Mecham (1924–2008) and his wife, Florence (1925–2012)

Following his removal from office and acquittal in his criminal trial, Mecham remained active in politics for several years. He served as an at-large delegate to the 1988 Republican National Convention at the Louisiana Superdome in New Orleans, Louisiana, in August 1988. Two years later in 1990, he made an unsuccessful attempt to regain the Arizona governor's office. In 1992, he received one nomination vote for President of the United States at the Constitution Party National Convention, and ran for the U.S. Senate as an independent against incumbent John McCain, receiving 145,361 votes (10.52%). In 1995, Mecham became chairman of the Constitutionalist Networking Center, a group attempting to create a grassroots organization called the Constitutionally Unified Republic for Everybody (CURE). CURE advocated political candidates supporting a strict interpretation of the United States Constitution.

Mecham spent several years attempting to start a new newspaper, but was unable to secure sufficient financial backing. In 1999, Mecham wrote his third book, Wrongful Impeachment. Declining health, including Alzheimer's disease and Parkinson's disease, first reported in 2004, forced Mecham's withdrawal from the public arena and his commitment to the dementia unit of the Arizona State Veterans' Home in Phoenix. He died on February 21, 2008, in Glendale, Arizona, four years after the diagnosis, and is interred at the National Memorial Cemetery of Arizona in Phoenix. His wife, who died four years later in 2012, was buried alongside him.

The canceled Martin Luther King Day served as a point of controversy for years following Mecham's removal from gubernatorial office. In 1989, the Arizona legislature designated a MLK holiday by canceling the state's Columbus Day holiday; this was challenged by two different groups, one a conservative group opposed to the King holiday due to King's communist ties and the other composed of Italian-Americans opposed to the removal of the Columbus Day holiday. So the new public holiday was forced to undergo a referendum of voter approval. Neither of the two competing ballot initiatives during the 1990 state election—one removing the Columbus Day holiday to make way for a new MLK day holiday, the other to add an extra paid holiday to the state calendar—obtained a required majority even though 65% of voters supported at least one form of the holiday. In response to the voters' rejection of a King holiday, the Arizona state tourism officials estimated that concert and convention business worth $190 million were canceled and the National Football League moved Super Bowl XXVII, worth an estimated $150 million that year, from the state, to Pasadena, California. Another initiative in 1992 succeeded in creation of a statewide MLK day holiday (without removing the earlier Columbus Day from the calendar). Afterwards, the NFL awarded the subsequent 1996 Super Bowl XXX to Arizona.

Arizona's election laws were also affected by Mecham's governorship legacy. In 1988, Arizona voters passed an election initiative that amended the Arizona state constitution to require a subsequent runoff election when no candidate received a majority of the votes cast in a general election. This runoff requirement came into play only two years later in the 1990 election of Fife Symington III, who received more votes than Democratic candidate Terry Goddard but fell just shy of a majority because of a minor independent candidate also on the ballot. The constitutional amendment requiring the runoff was repealed by the voters only two years later in 1992.

Former Governor Mecham's earlier press secretary argued, in retrospect, that his overriding legacy was unfair:

The tragic fact ... is that Mecham will be remembered as an incompetent, bumbling bigot who got what he deserved. But ... he had some charming personal qualities. He had a genuine interest in helping the disadvantaged. He understood economic development far better than his predecessor, Bruce Babbitt, or his successor, Rose Mofford. He believed in economic equality for all races and minorities, arguing this would be necessary before political and social equality could be achieved. He was deeply troubled by rampant drug abuse. And, his pet project this year [1988] would have been a statewide campaign to help illiterate adults learn to read. This side of Mecham was lost in a fog of controversy that he helped create.

== Publications ==
- Come Back America. Glendale, Ariz.: MP Press. 1982. OCLC 9589917.
- Impeachment: The Arizona Conspiracy. Glendale, Ariz.: MP Press. 1988. OCLC 18761566.
- Wrongful Impeachment. Prime News Press. 1999. ISBN 978-1-929360-00-0.

== Notes ==
Party political offices
Preceded by Ross F. Jones	Republican nominee for U.S. Senator from Arizona (Class 3); 1962	Succeeded by Barry Goldwater
Preceded by Russell Williams	Republican nominee for Governor of Arizona; 1978	Succeeded by Leo Corbet
Preceded by Leo Corbet	Republican nominee for Governor of Arizona; 1986	Succeeded by Fife Symington III
Political offices
Preceded by Bruce Babbitt	Governor of Arizona; 1987–1988	Succeeded by Rose Mofford
