= Don Owens =

Don Owens may refer to:

- Donald Owens (born 1926), American ordained minister in Missouri
- Don Owens (American football) (1932–1997), American football player
- Donald L. Owens (1930–2012), American military officer and aviator
