= 1984 Arizona House of Representatives election =

1984 Arizona House of Representatives elections
- November 6, 1984

All 60 seats in the Arizona House 31 seats needed for a majority
	Majority party	Minority party
Leader	Frank Kelley	Art Hamilton
Party	Republican	Democratic
Leader's seat	26th	22nd
Last election	39	21
Seats after	38	22
Seat change	▼1	▲1
Speaker before election
Frank Kelley
Republican
Elected Speaker
James J. Sossaman
Republican

The 1984 Arizona House of Representatives elections were held on November 6, 1984. Voters elected all 60 members of the Arizona House of Representatives in multi-member districts to serve a two-year term. The elections coincided with the elections for other offices, including U.S. House and State Senate. Primary elections were held on September 11, 1984.

Prior to the elections, the Republicans held a majority of 39 seats over the Democrats' 21 seats.

Following the elections, Republicans maintained control of the chamber, though their majority was reduced to 38 Republicans to 22 Democrats, a net gain of one seat for Democrats.

The newly elected members served in the 37th Arizona State Legislature, during which Republican James J. Sossaman was elected as Speaker of the Arizona House. (Note: Sossaman was elected as Speaker for the 37th legislature, defeating Democratic Leader Representative Art Hamilton, who was also nominated for Speaker. The vote tally for Speaker was: Sossaman-38 votes to Hamilton-22 votes.)

== Summary of Results by Arizona State Legislative District ==
District	Incumbent	Party	Elected Representative	Outcome
1st	Don Aldridge	Rep	Don Aldridge	Rep Hold
1st	Jerry Everall	Rep	Dave Carson	Rep Hold
2nd	Sam A. McConnell Jr.	Rep	Sam A. McConnell Jr. (Note: Republican Sam A. McConnell Jr. of District 2 died in office on July 21, 1986. Republican Verne Daniel Seidel Jr. was appointed on August 1, 1986. Representative Seidel was appointed to fill the vacancy by the supervisors of the five counties that made up District 2 at that time.)	Rep Hold
2nd	John Wettaw	Rep	John Wettaw	Rep Hold
3rd	Benjamin Hanley	Dem	Benjamin Hanley	Dem Hold
3rd	Daniel Peaches	Rep	Jack C. Jackson	Dem Gain
4th	E. C. "Polly" Rosenbaum	Dem	E. C. "Polly" Rosenbaum	Dem Hold
4th	Edward G. "Bunch" Guerrero	Dem	Edward G. "Bunch" Guerrero	Dem Hold
5th	Frank McElhaney	Dem	Frank McElhaney (Note: Democrat Herb Guenther was appointed on December 10, 1985 by the Yuma County Board of Supervisors to fill the unexpired term of Democratic Representative Frank McElhaney, deceased December 7, 1985.)	Dem Hold
5th	Robert J. "Bob" McLendon	Dem	Robert J. "Bob" McLendon	Dem Hold
6th	Jim Hartdegen	Rep	Jim Hartdegen	Rep Hold
6th	Henry Evans	Dem	Henry Evans	Dem Hold
7th	Richard "Dick" Pacheco	Dem	Richard "Dick" Pacheco	Dem Hold
7th	Roy Hudson	Dem	Roy Hudson	Dem Hold
8th	Joe Lane	Rep	Joe Lane	Rep Hold
8th	Steve J. Vukcevich	Dem	Gus Arzberger	Dem Hold
9th	Bill English	Rep	Bill English	Rep Hold
9th	Bart Baker	Rep	Bart Baker	Rep Hold
10th	Carmen Cajero	Dem	Carmen Cajero	Dem Hold
10th	Jesus "Chuy" Higuera	Dem	Jesus "Chuy" Higuera	Dem Hold
11th	Peter Goudinoff	Dem	Peter Goudinoff	Dem Hold
11th	John Kromko	Dem	John Kromko	Dem Hold
12th	Jack B. Jewett	Rep	Jack B. Jewett	Rep Hold
12th	Pete Hershberger	Rep	Reid Ewing	Dem Gain
13th	Larry Hawke	Rep	Larry Hawke	Rep Hold
13th	David C. Bartlett	Dem	David C. Bartlett	Dem Hold
14th	Jim Green	Rep	Jim Green	Rep Hold
14th	Cindy L. Resnick	Dem	Cindy L. Resnick	Dem Hold
15th	James B. Ratliff	Rep	James B. Ratliff	Rep Hold
15th	Bob Denny	Rep	Bob Denny	Rep Hold
16th	Bob Hungerford	Rep	Bob Hungerford	Rep Hold
16th	Rhonda Thomas	Rep	Karen Mills	Rep Hold
17th	Patricia "Pat" Wright	Rep	Patricia "Pat" Wright	Rep Hold
17th	Sterling Ridge	Rep	Sterling Ridge	Rep Hold
18th	Burton S. Barr	Rep	Burton S. Barr	Rep Hold
18th	Jane Dee Hull	Rep	Jane Dee Hull	Rep Hold
19th	Jan Brewer	Rep	Jan Brewer	Rep Hold
19th	Nancy Wessel	Rep	Nancy Wessel	Rep Hold
20th	Debbie McCune	Dem	Debbie McCune	Dem Hold
20th	Glenn Davis	Dem	Trent Franks	Rep Gain
21st	Henry H. Haws	Rep	Henry H. Haws	Rep Hold
21st	Leslie Whiting Johnson	Rep	Leslie Whiting Johnson	Rep Hold
22nd	Art Hamilton	Dem	Art Hamilton	Dem Hold
22nd	Earl V. Wilcox	Dem	Earl V. Wilcox	Dem Hold
23rd	Carolyn Walker	Dem	Carolyn Walker	Dem Hold
23rd	Armando Ruiz	Dem	Armando Ruiz	Dem Hold
24th	Chris Herstam	Rep	Chris Herstam	Rep Hold
24th	Cal Holman	Rep	Gary Giordano	Rep Hold
25th	Elizabeth Adams Rockwell	Rep	Elizabeth Adams Rockwell	Rep Hold
25th	Don Kenney	Rep	John King	Rep Hold
26th	Frank Kelley	Rep	Frank Kelley	Rep Hold
26th	Jim Meredith	Rep	Jim Meredith	Rep Hold
27th	Doug Todd	Rep	Doug Todd	Rep Hold
27th	Bev Hermon	Rep	Bev Hermon	Rep Hold
28th	Jim Skelly	Rep	Jim Skelly	Rep Hold
28th	Paul R. Messinger	Rep	Heinz R. Hink	Rep Hold
29th	Jim Cooper	Rep	Jim Cooper	Rep Hold
29th	Lela Steffey	Rep	Lela Steffey	Rep Hold
30th	James J. Sossaman	Rep	James J. Sossaman	Rep Hold
30th	Mark W. Killian	Rep	Mark W. Killian	Rep Hold

== Detailed Results ==
=== District 1 ===
Primary Election Results
Party	Candidate	Votes	%
Democratic Party Primary Results
Democratic	Kathy Laing	5,719	51.87%
Democratic	James Edwin Pryor	5,306	48.13%
Total votes		11,025	100.00%
Republican Party Primary Results
Republican	Don Aldridge (incumbent)	7,098	32.14%
Republican	Dave Carson	5,510	24.95%
Republican	Carol R. Mumford	4,653	21.07%
Republican	A. C. Williams	3,006	13.61%
Republican	John W. Cooper, Sr.	1,820	8.24%
Total votes		22,087	100.00%

General Election Results
Party	Candidate	Votes	%
Republican	Don Aldridge (incumbent)	25,848	34.20%
Republican	Dave Carson	23,293	30.82%
Democratic	Kathy Laing	15,394	20.37%
Democratic	James Edwin Pryor	11,034	14.60%
Total votes		75,569	100.00%
Republican hold			
Republican hold			

=== District 2 ===
Primary Election Results
Party	Candidate	Votes	%
Republican Party Primary Results
Republican	Sam A. McConnell Jr. (incumbent)	6,663	50.50%
Republican	John Wettaw (incumbent)	6,532	49.50%
Total votes		13,195	100.00%

General Election Results
Party	Candidate	Votes	%
Republican	John Wettaw (incumbent)	26,673	50.22%
Republican	Sam A. McConnell Jr. (incumbent)	26,443	49.78%
Total votes		53,116	100.00%
Republican hold			
Republican hold			

=== District 3 ===
Primary Election Results
Party	Candidate	Votes	%
Democratic Party Primary Results
Democratic	Jack C. Jackson	5,686	41.66%
Democratic	Benjamin Hanley (incumbent)	5,374	39.38%
Democratic	William P. Battles	1,508	11.05%
Democratic	Mac "Pooley" Stant	1,080	7.91%
Total votes		13,648	100.00%
Republican Party Primary Results
Republican	Daniel Peaches (incumbent)	1,832	100.00%
Total votes		1,832	100.00%

General Election Results
Party	Candidate	Votes	%
Democratic	Jack C. Jackson	11,242	37.20%
Democratic	Benjamin Hanley (incumbent)	10,223	33.83%
Republican	Daniel Peaches (incumbent)	8,757	28.98%
Total votes		30,222	100.00%
Democratic hold			
Democratic gain from Republican			

=== District 4 ===
Primary Election Results
Party	Candidate	Votes	%
Democratic Party Primary Results
Democratic	E. C. "Polly" Rosenbaum (incumbent)	9,405	33.12%
Democratic	Edward G. "Bunch" Guerrero (incumbent)	7,928	27.92%
Democratic	Louis B. Ellsworth Jr.	6,153	21.67%
Democratic	Mattie "Bea" Brannan	4,914	17.30%
Total votes		28,400	100.00%
Republican Party Primary Results
Republican	Clarence E. "Clancy" Finman	3,228	100.00%
Total votes		3,228	100.00%

General Election Results
Party	Candidate	Votes	%
Democratic	E. C. "Polly" Rosenbaum (incumbent)	19,386	40.22%
Democratic	Edward G. "Bunch" Guerrero (incumbent)	15,560	32.28%
Republican	Clarence E. "Clancy" Finman	13,251	27.49%
Total votes		48,197	100.00%
Democratic hold			
Democratic hold			

=== District 5 ===
Primary Election Results
Party	Candidate	Votes	%
Democratic Party Primary Results
Democratic	Robert J. "Bob" McLendon (incumbent)	6,199	40.87%
Democratic	Frank McElhaney (incumbent)	5,453	35.95%
Democratic	Travis "Bud" Yancey	3,516	23.18%
Total votes		15,168	100.00%
Republican Party Primary Results
Republican	Arnold E. "Arnie" Bulick	3,069	100.00%
Total votes		3,069	100.00%

General Election Results
Party	Candidate	Votes	%
Democratic	Robert J. "Bob" McLendon (incumbent)	15,450	40.38%
Democratic	Frank McElhaney (incumbent)	14,765	38.59%
Republican	Arnold E. "Arnie" Bulick	8,042	21.02%
Total votes		38,257	100.00%
Democratic hold			
Democratic hold			

=== District 6 ===
Primary Election Results
Party	Candidate	Votes	%
Democratic Party Primary Results
Democratic	Henry Evans (incumbent)	5,172	58.29%
Democratic	Bobby Raymond	3,701	41.71%
Total votes		8,873	100.00%
Republican Party Primary Results
Republican	Jim Hartdegen (incumbent)	2,598	100.00%
Total votes		2,598	100.00%

General Election Results
Party	Candidate	Votes	%
Republican	Jim Hartdegen (incumbent)	13,902	38.82%
Democratic	Henry Evans (incumbent)	11,929	33.31%
Democratic	Bobby Raymond	9,983	27.87%
Total votes		35,814	100.00%
Republican hold			
Democratic hold			

=== District 7 ===
Primary Election Results
Party	Candidate	Votes	%
Democratic Party Primary Results
Democratic	Richard "Dick" Pacheco (incumbent)	7,528	52.68%
Democratic	Roy Hudson (incumbent)	6,763	47.32%
Total votes		14,291	100.00%

General Election Results
Party	Candidate	Votes	%
Democratic	Roy Hudson (incumbent)	16,912	51.65%
Democratic	Richard "Dick" Pacheco (incumbent)	15,830	48.35%
Total votes		32,742	100.00%
Democratic hold			
Democratic hold			

=== District 8 ===
Primary Election Results
Party	Candidate	Votes	%
Democratic Party Primary Results
Democratic	T. J. "Jim" Willson	6,546	29.33%
Democratic	Gus Arzberger	6,124	27.44%
Democratic	Les Davis	5,362	24.03%
Democratic	William H. "Bill" Blazier	4,286	19.20%
Total votes		22,318	100.00%
Republican Party Primary Results
Republican	Joe Lane (incumbent)	2,940	52.52%
Republican	Arden J. Palmer	2,658	47.48%
Total votes		5,598	100.00%

General Election Results
Party	Candidate	Votes	%
Democratic	Gus Arzberger	13,115	27.38%
Republican	Joe Lane (incumbent)	12,351	25.78%
Democratic	T. J. "Jim" Willson	12,190	25.45%
Republican	Arden J. Palmer	10,247	21.39%
Total votes		47,903	100.00%
Democratic hold			
Republican hold			

=== District 9 ===
Primary Election Results
Party	Candidate	Votes	%
Democratic Party Primary Results
Democratic	William D. "Bill" Jones	6,241	100.00%
Total votes		6,241	100.00%
Republican Party Primary Results
Republican	Bill English (incumbent)	6,871	51.95%
Republican	Bart Baker (incumbent)	6,356	48.05%
Total votes		13,227	100.00%

General Election Results
Party	Candidate	Votes	%
Republican	Bill English (incumbent)	21,207	37.36%
Republican	Bart Baker (incumbent)	20,982	36.96%
Democratic	William D. "Bill" Jones	14,575	25.68%
Total votes		56,764	100.00%
Republican hold			
Republican hold			

=== District 10 ===
Primary Election Results
Party	Candidate	Votes	%
Democratic Party Primary Results
Democratic	Carmen Cajero (incumbent)	4,015	55.49%
Democratic	Jesus "Chuy" Higuera (incumbent)	3,221	44.51%
Total votes		7,236	100.00%

General Election Results
Party	Candidate	Votes	%
Democratic	Carmen Cajero (incumbent)	12,524	54.15%
Democratic	Jesus "Chuy" Higuera (incumbent)	10,604	45.85%
Total votes		23,128	100.00%
Democratic hold			
Democratic hold			

=== District 11 ===
Primary Election Results
Party	Candidate	Votes	%
Democratic Party Primary Results
Democratic	John Kromko (incumbent)	5,444	50.94%
Democratic	Peter Goudinoff (incumbent)	5,243	49.06%
Total votes		10,687	100.00%
Libertarian Party Primary Results
Libertarian	Randy Clamons (Note: Was a write-in candidate in the primary election.)	11	100.00%
Total votes		11	100.00%

General Election Results
Party	Candidate	Votes	%
Democratic	Peter Goudinoff (incumbent)	18,979	50.35%
Democratic	John Kromko (incumbent)	18,712	49.65%
Total votes		37,691	100.00%
Democratic hold			
Democratic hold			

=== District 12 ===
Primary Election Results
Party	Candidate	Votes	%
Democratic Party Primary Results
Democratic	Reid Ewing	6,297	59.74%
Democratic	Lonnie Capps	4,244	40.26%
Total votes		10,541	100.00%
Republican Party Primary Results
Republican	Pete Hershberger (incumbent)	6,277	50.44%
Republican	Jack B. Jewett (incumbent)	6,167	49.56%
Total votes		12,444	100.00%

General Election Results
Party	Candidate	Votes	%
Republican	Jack B. Jewett (incumbent)	23,882	30.36%
Democratic	Reid Ewing	21,528	27.37%
Republican	Pete Hershberger (incumbent)	20,712	26.33%
Democratic	Lonnie Capps	12,535	15.94%
Total votes		78,657	100.00%
Republican hold			
Democratic gain from Republican			

=== District 13 ===
Primary Election Results
Party	Candidate	Votes	%
Democratic Party Primary Results
Democratic	David C. Bartlett (incumbent)	5,236	55.19%
Democratic	Helen Grace Carlson	4,251	44.81%
Total votes		9,487	100.00%
Republican Party Primary Results
Republican	Larry Hawke (incumbent)	7,138	53.59%
Republican	Thomas Jay Lewellen	6,181	46.41%
Total votes		13,319	100.00%

General Election Results
Party	Candidate	Votes	%
Republican	Larry Hawke (incumbent)	26,225	32.95%
Democratic	David C. Bartlett (incumbent)	21,080	26.49%
Republican	Tom Lewellen	18,854	23.69%
Democratic	Helen Grace Carlson	13,431	16.88%
Total votes		79,590	100.00%
Republican hold			
Democratic hold			

=== District 14 ===
Primary Election Results
Party	Candidate	Votes	%
Democratic Party Primary Results
Democratic	Cindy L. Resnick (incumbent)	5,227	94.62%
Democratic	Dot Shuff	297	5.38%
Total votes		5,524	100.00%
Republican Party Primary Results
Republican	Jim Green (incumbent)	5,718	52.14%
Republican	Frank Evans	5,248	47.86%
Total votes		10,966	100.00%
Libertarian Party Primary Results
Libertarian	Tom R. Goodwin	4	100.00%
Total votes		4	100.00%

General Election Results
Party	Candidate	Votes	%
Republican	Jim Green (incumbent)	21,024	36.71%
Democratic	Cindy L. Resnick (incumbent)	19,303	33.70%
Republican	Frank Evans	16,949	29.59%
Total votes		57,276	100.00%
Republican hold			
Democratic hold			

=== District 15 ===
Primary Election Results
Party	Candidate	Votes	%
Democratic Party Primary Results
Democratic	Dana R. Peiffer	2,779	100.00%
Total votes		2,779	100.00%
Republican Party Primary Results
Republican	Bob Denny (incumbent)	5,131	50.35%
Republican	James B. Ratliff (incumbent)	5,059	49.65%
Total votes		10,190	100.00%

General Election Results
Party	Candidate	Votes	%
Republican	Bob Denny (incumbent)	20,789	39.95%
Republican	James B. Ratliff (incumbent)	19,837	38.12%
Democratic	Dana R. Peiffer	11,411	21.93%
Total votes		52,037	100.00%
Republican hold			
Republican hold			

=== District 16 ===
Primary Election Results
Party	Candidate	Votes	%
Democratic Party Primary Results
Democratic	Harold R. Miller	2,011	50.06%
Democratic	Frances Patricia Counts	2,006	49.94%
Total votes		4,017	100.00%
Republican Party Primary Results
Republican	Bob Hungerford (incumbent)	3,123	52.31%
Republican	Karen Mills	2,847	47.69%
Total votes		5,970	100.00%

General Election Results
Party	Candidate	Votes	%
Republican	Bob Hungerford (incumbent)	21,596	36.04%
Republican	Karen Mills	20,214	33.74%
Democratic	Harold R. Miller	9,192	15.34%
Democratic	Frances Patricia Counts	8,912	14.87%
Total votes		59,914	100.00%
Republican hold			
Republican hold			

=== District 17 ===
Primary Election Results
Party	Candidate	Votes	%
Republican Party Primary Results
Republican	Patricia "Pat" Wright (incumbent)	6,036	51.59%
Republican	Sterling Ridge (incumbent)	5,664	48.41%
Total votes		11,700	100.00%

General Election Results
Party	Candidate	Votes	%
Republican	Patricia "Pat" Wright (incumbent)	26,020	53.26%
Republican	Sterling Ridge (incumbent)	22,831	46.74%
Total votes		48,851	100.00%
Republican hold			
Republican hold			

=== District 18 ===
Primary Election Results
Party	Candidate	Votes	%
Democratic Party Primary Results
Democratic	Steven L. Berman	2,414	100.00%
Total votes		2,414	100.00%
Republican Party Primary Results
Republican	Burton S. Barr (incumbent)	4,550	51.34%
Republican	Jane Dee Hull (incumbent)	4,313	48.66%
Total votes		8,863	100.00%

General Election Results
Party	Candidate	Votes	%
Republican	Burton S. Barr (incumbent)	22,891	41.67%
Republican	Jane Dee Hull (incumbent)	20,915	38.08%
Democratic	Steven L. Berman	11,122	20.25%
Total votes		54,928	100.00%
Republican hold			
Republican hold			

=== District 19 ===
Primary Election Results
Party	Candidate	Votes	%
Democratic Party Primary Results
Democratic	William "Bill" E. Smith	2,156	51.63%
Democratic	Tim Rockey	2,020	48.37%
Total votes		4,176	100.00%
Republican Party Primary Results
Republican	Nancy Wessel (incumbent)	4,630	50.11%
Republican	Jan Brewer (incumbent)	4,609	49.89%
Total votes		9,239	100.00%

General Election Results
Party	Candidate	Votes	%
Republican	Nancy Wessel (incumbent)	26,800	36.09%
Republican	Jan Brewer (incumbent)	26,035	35.06%
Democratic	William "Bill" E. Smith	11,356	15.29%
Democratic	Tim Rockey	10,069	13.56%
Total votes		74,260	100.00%
Republican hold			
Republican hold			

=== District 20 ===
Primary Election Results
Party	Candidate	Votes	%
Democratic Party Primary Results
Democratic	Debbie McCune (incumbent)	2,978	52.55%
Democratic	Glenn Davis (incumbent)	2,689	47.45%
Total votes		5,667	100.00%
Republican Party Primary Results
Republican	Richard Adams	2,082	39.31%
Republican	Trent Franks	1,645	31.06%
Republican	Rex J. Farley	1,569	29.63%
Total votes		5,296	100.00%

General Election Results
Party	Candidate	Votes	%
Democratic	Debbie McCune (incumbent)	15,575	30.66%
Republican	Trent Franks	13,166	25.92%
Democratic	Glenn Davis (incumbent)	12,937	25.47%
Republican	Richard Adams	9,125	17.96%
Total votes		50,803	100.00%
Democratic hold			
Republican gain from Democratic			

=== District 21 ===
Primary Election Results
Party	Candidate	Votes	%
Republican Party Primary Results
Republican	Henry H. Haws (incumbent)	4,600	50.47%
Republican	Leslie Whiting Johnson (incumbent)	4,515	49.53%
Total votes		9,115	100.00%

General Election Results
Party	Candidate	Votes	%
Republican	Henry H. Haws (incumbent)	23,152	50.67%
Republican	Leslie Whiting Johnson (incumbent)	22,538	49.33%
Total votes		45,690	100.00%
Republican hold			
Republican hold			

=== District 22 ===
Primary Election Results
Party	Candidate	Votes	%
Democratic Party Primary Results
Democratic	Earl V. Wilcox (incumbent)	2,188	50.08%
Democratic	Art Hamilton (incumbent)	2,181	49.92%
Total votes		4,369	100.00%
Republican Party Primary Results
Republican	Shelley Vogel	851	100.00%
Total votes		851	100.00%

General Election Results
Party	Candidate	Votes	%
Democratic	Earl V. Wilcox (incumbent)	8,832	36.13%
Democratic	Art Hamilton (incumbent)	8,768	35.87%
Republican	Shelley Vogel	4,983	20.39%
Independent	Trinquilino T. Madrid	1,861	7.61%
Total votes		24,444	100.00%
Democratic hold			
Democratic hold			

=== District 23 ===
Primary Election Results
Party	Candidate	Votes	%
Democratic Party Primary Results
Democratic	Carolyn Walker (incumbent)	2,697	39.91%
Democratic	Armando Ruiz (incumbent)	2,154	31.88%
Democratic	Tony R. Abril, Sr.	1,399	20.70%
Democratic	Harold Lindmark	507	7.50%
Total votes		6,757	100.00%

General Election Results
Party	Candidate	Votes	%
Democratic	Carolyn Walker (incumbent)	10,881	55.31%
Democratic	Armando Ruiz (incumbent)	8,793	44.69%
Total votes		19,674	100.00%
Democratic hold			
Democratic hold			

=== District 24 ===
Primary Election Results
Party	Candidate	Votes	%
Democratic Party Primary Results
Democratic	Linda Becker Brickman	2,151	100.00%
Total votes		2,151	100.00%
Republican Party Primary Results
Republican	Chris Herstam (incumbent)	4,995	41.28%
Republican	Gary Giordano	4,644	38.38%
Republican	Cal Holman (incumbent)	2,460	20.33%
Total votes		12,099	100.00%

General Election Results
Party	Candidate	Votes	%
Republican	Chris Herstam (incumbent)	23,431	38.67%
Republican	Gary Giordano	22,239	36.70%
Democratic	Linda Becker Brickman	14,922	24.63%
Total votes		60,592	100.00%
Republican hold			
Republican hold			

=== District 25 ===
Primary Election Results
Party	Candidate	Votes	%
Democratic Party Primary Results
Democratic	Claire Sargent	3,405	100.00%
Total votes		3,405	100.00%
Republican Party Primary Results
Republican	Elizabeth Adams Rockwell (incumbent)	3,094	28.27%
Republican	John King	2,906	26.55%
Republican	Robert Updike	2,090	19.10%
Republican	Claire Duff	1,631	14.90%
Republican	Angela "Angie" Lohman	1,223	11.18%
Total votes		10,944	100.00%

General Election Results
Party	Candidate	Votes	%
Republican	Elizabeth Adams Rockwell (incumbent)	17,949	36.70%
Republican	John King	16,533	33.80%
Democratic	Claire Sargent	14,431	29.50%
Total votes		48,913	100.00%
Republican hold			
Republican hold			

=== District 26 ===
Primary Election Results
Party	Candidate	Votes	%
Republican Party Primary Results
Republican	Jim Meredith (incumbent)	4,790	51.31%
Republican	Frank Kelley (incumbent)	4,545	48.69%
Total votes		9,335	100.00%

General Election Results
Party	Candidate	Votes	%
Republican	Jim Meredith (incumbent)	25,501	52.85%
Republican	Frank Kelley (incumbent)	22,747	47.15%
Total votes		48,248	100.00%
Republican hold			
Republican hold			

=== District 27 ===
Primary Election Results
Party	Candidate	Votes	%
Democratic Party Primary Results
Democratic	Steve Ponton	2,371	50.18%
Democratic	Richard Keith Dagger	2,354	49.82%
Total votes		4,725	100.00%
Republican Party Primary Results
Republican	Doug Todd (incumbent)	4,791	51.25%
Republican	Bev Hermon (incumbent)	4,557	48.75%
Total votes		9,348	100.00%

General Election Results
Party	Candidate	Votes	%
Republican	Doug Todd (incumbent)	22,933	33.44%
Republican	Bev Hermon (incumbent)	22,790	33.23%
Democratic	Steve Ponton	10,939	15.95%
Democratic	Richard Keith Dagger	10,799	15.75%
Independent	Salvatore Galli (Note: Ran as a "Conservative Independent" candidate.)	1,112	1.62%
Total votes		68,573	100.00%
Republican hold			
Republican hold			

=== District 28 ===
Primary Election Results
Party	Candidate	Votes	%
Democratic Party Primary Results
Democratic	Roger Grody	1,756	100.00%
Total votes		1,756	100.00%
Republican Party Primary Results
Republican	Jim Skelly (incumbent)	4,599	50.90%
Republican	Heinz R. Hink	4,437	49.10%
Total votes		9,036	100.00%

General Election Results
Party	Candidate	Votes	%
Republican	Jim Skelly (incumbent)	30,329	42.06%
Republican	Heinz R. Hink	27,832	38.60%
Democratic	Roger Grody	13,940	19.33%
Total votes		72,101	100.00%
Republican hold			
Republican hold			

=== District 29 ===
Primary Election Results
Party	Candidate	Votes	%
Republican Party Primary Results
Republican	Jim Cooper (incumbent)	4,182	50.54%
Republican	Lela Steffey (incumbent)	4,092	49.46%
Total votes		8,274	100.00%

General Election Results
Party	Candidate	Votes	%
Republican	Jim Cooper (incumbent)	21,643	51.90%
Republican	Lela Steffey (incumbent)	20,056	48.10%
Total votes		41,699	100.00%
Republican hold			
Republican hold			

=== District 30 ===
Primary Election Results
Party	Candidate	Votes	%
Republican Party Primary Results
Republican	Mark W. Killian (incumbent)	4,467	50.16%
Republican	James J. Sossaman (incumbent)	4,439	49.84%
Total votes		8,906	100.00%

General Election Results
Party	Candidate	Votes	%
Republican	Mark W. Killian (incumbent)	29,385	50.14%
Republican	James J. Sossaman (incumbent)	29,219	49.86%
Total votes		58,604	100.00%
Republican hold			
Republican hold			
