= Arizona Proposition 100 =

Arizona Proposition 100 may refer to:

- Arizona Proposition 100 (2010), a 2010 ballot measure to temporarily raise the Arizona state sales tax by 1 cent per dollar.
- Arizona Proposition 100, any of several Arizona ballot propositions
