= 1982 Arizona House of Representatives election =

1982 Arizona House of Representatives elections
- November 2, 1982

All 60 seats in the Arizona House 31 seats needed for a majority
	Majority party	Minority party
Leader	Frank Kelley	Art Hamilton
Party	Republican	Democratic
Leader's seat	26th	22nd
Last election	43	17
Seats after	39	21
Seat change	▼4	▲4
Speaker before election
Frank Kelley
Republican
Elected Speaker
Frank Kelley
Republican

The 1982 Arizona House of Representatives elections were held on November 2, 1982. Voters elected all 60 members of the Arizona House of Representatives in multi-member districts to serve a two-year term. The elections coincided with the elections for other offices, including Governor, U.S. Senate, U.S. House, and State Senate. Primary elections were held on September 7, 1982.

Prior to the elections, the Republicans held a majority of 43 seats over the Democrats' 17 seats.

Following the elections, Republicans maintained control of the chamber, though their majority was reduced to 39 Republicans to 21 Democrats, a net gain of four seats for Democrats.

The newly elected members served in the 36th Arizona State Legislature, during which Republican Frank Kelley was re-elected as Speaker of the Arizona House. (Note: Kelley was re-elected as Speaker for the 36th legislature by acclamation.)

== Summary of Results by Arizona State Legislative District ==
District	Incumbent	Party	Elected Representative	Outcome
1st	Jerry Everall	Rep	Jerry Everall	Rep Hold
1st	John Hays	Rep	Don Aldridge	Rep Hold
2nd	Sam A. McConnell Jr.	Rep	Sam A. McConnell Jr.	Rep Hold
2nd	John Wettaw	Rep	John Wettaw	Rep Hold
3rd	Benjamin Hanley	Dem	Benjamin Hanley	Dem Hold
3rd	Daniel Peaches	Rep	Daniel Peaches	Rep Hold
4th	E. C. "Polly" Rosenbaum	Dem	E. C. "Polly" Rosenbaum	Dem Hold
4th	Edward G. "Bunch" Guerrero	Dem	Edward G. "Bunch" Guerrero	Dem Hold
5th	Frank McElhaney	Dem	Frank McElhaney	Dem Hold
5th	Morris "Court" Courtright	Rep	Robert J. "Bob" McLendon	Dem Gain
6th	Jim Hartdegen	Rep	Jim Hartdegen	Rep Hold
6th	Renz D. Jennings (Note: Redistricted from district 6 to 23.)	Dem	Henry Evans	Dem Hold
7th	Richard "Dick" Pacheco	Dem	Richard "Dick" Pacheco	Dem Hold
7th	George W. Kline	Rep	Roy Hudson	Dem Gain
8th	Steve J. Vukcevich	Dem	Steve J. Vukcevich	Dem Hold
8th	Joe Lane	Rep	Joe Lane	Rep Hold
9th	Bill English	Rep	Bill English	Rep Hold
9th	Bart Baker	Rep	Bart Baker	Rep Hold
10th	Carmen F. Cajero	Dem	Carmen F. Cajero	Dem Hold
10th	Jesus "Chuy" Higuera	Dem	Jesus "Chuy" Higuera	Dem Hold
11th	Peter Goudinoff	Dem	Peter Goudinoff	Dem Hold
11th	Mike Morales	Rep	John Kromko	Dem Gain
12th	Thomas N. "Tom" Goodwin	Rep	Pete Hershberger	Rep Hold
12th	Elmer D. "E.D." Jewett Jr.	Rep	Jack B. Jewett (Note: Representative Elmer D. "E.D." Jewett Jr. was the father of Representative Jack B. Jewett.)	Rep Hold
13th	Larry Hawke	Rep	Larry Hawke	Rep Hold
13th	David M. Rodriguez (Note: Democrat Clare Dunn of District 13 died in office on July 30, 1981. David M. Rodriguez was appointed on August 7, 1981 by the Pima County Board of Supervisors to fill the vacancy.)	Dem	David C. Bartlett	Dem Hold
14th	Elizabeth H. "Lew" Macy	Rep	Jim Green	Rep Hold
14th	William J. "Bill" De Long	Rep	Cindy L. Resnick	Dem Gain
15th	James B. Ratliff	Rep	James B. Ratliff	Rep Hold
15th	Bob Denny	Rep	Bob Denny	Rep Hold
16th	Bob Hungerford	Rep	Bob Hungerford	Rep Hold
16th	Rhonda Thomas	Rep	Rhonda Thomas	Rep Hold
17th	Patricia "Pat" Wright	Rep	Patricia "Pat" Wright	Rep Hold
17th	C. W. "Bill" Lewis	Rep	Sterling Ridge	Rep Hold
18th	Burton S. Barr	Rep	Burton S. Barr	Rep Hold
18th	Pete Dunn	Rep	Jane Dee Hull (Note: Redistricted from district 19 to 18.)	Rep Hold
19th	Tony West	Rep	Jan Brewer	Rep Hold
19th	Jane Dee Hull	Rep	Nancy Wessel	Rep Hold
20th	Debbie McCune	Dem	Debbie McCune	Dem Hold
20th	Lillian K. Jordan	Rep	Glenn Davis (Note: Redistricted from district 25 to 20.)	Dem Gain
21st	Elizabeth Adams Rockwell (Note: Redistricted from district 21 to 25.)	Rep	Henry H. Haws	Rep Hold
21st	Don Kenney (Note: Redistricted from district 21 to 25.)	Rep	Leslie Whiting Johnson	Rep Hold
22nd	Art Hamilton	Dem	Art Hamilton	Dem Hold
22nd	Earl V. Wilcox	Dem	Earl V. Wilcox	Dem Hold
23rd	Leon Thompson	Dem	Carolyn Walker	Dem Hold
23rd	Tony R. Abril	Dem	Armando Ruiz	Dem Hold
24th	Cal Holman	Rep	Cal Holman	Rep Hold
24th	Pete Corpstein	Rep	Chris Herstam	Rep Hold
25th	D. Lee Jones	Rep	Elizabeth Adams Rockwell	Rep Hold
25th	Glenn Davis	Dem	Don Kenney	Rep Gain
26th	Frank Kelley	Rep	Frank Kelley	Rep Hold
26th	Jim Meredith	Rep	Jim Meredith	Rep Hold
27th	Doug Todd	Rep	Doug Todd	Rep Hold
27th	Juanita Harelson	Rep	Bev Hermon	Rep Hold
28th	Jim Skelly	Rep	Jim Skelly	Rep Hold
28th	Paul R. Messinger	Rep	Paul R. Messinger	Rep Hold
29th	Jim Cooper	Rep	Jim Cooper	Rep Hold
29th	Donna Carlson West	Rep	Lela Steffey	Rep Hold
30th	James J. Sossaman	Rep	James J. Sossaman	Rep Hold
30th	Carl J. Kunasek	Rep	Mark W. Killian	Rep Hold

== Detailed Results ==
=== District 1 ===
Primary Election Results
Party	Candidate	Votes	%
Democratic Party Primary Results
Democratic	Jim Thomas	5,831	100.00%
Total votes		5,831	100.00%
Republican Party Primary Results
Republican	Jerry Everall (incumbent)	5,467	28.91%
Republican	Don Aldridge	3,723	19.68%
Republican	Maurice "Maury" Coburn	3,391	17.93%
Republican	Jesse "Jess" F. Thomas	3,265	17.26%
Republican	Dave Carson	3,067	16.22%
Total votes		18,913	100.00%

General Election Results
Party	Candidate	Votes	%
Republican	Jerry Everall (incumbent)	18,292	37.24%
Republican	Don Aldridge	17,455	35.53%
Democratic	Jim Thomas	13,374	27.23%
Total votes		49,121	100.00%
Republican hold			
Republican hold			

=== District 2 ===
Primary Election Results
Party	Candidate	Votes	%
Republican Party Primary Results
Republican	Sam A. McConnell Jr. (incumbent)	4,950	50.93%
Republican	John Wettaw (incumbent)	4,770	49.07%
Total votes		9,720	100.00%

General Election Results
Party	Candidate	Votes	%
Republican	Sam A. McConnell Jr. (incumbent)	18,697	50.29%
Republican	John Wettaw (incumbent)	18,484	49.71%
Total votes		37,181	100.00%
Republican hold			
Republican hold			

=== District 3 ===
Primary Election Results
Party	Candidate	Votes	%
Democratic Party Primary Results
Democratic	Benjamin Hanley (incumbent)	4,445	100.00%
Total votes		4,445	100.00%
Republican Party Primary Results
Republican	Daniel Peaches (incumbent)	1,441	100.00%
Total votes		1,441	100.00%

General Election Results
Party	Candidate	Votes	%
Democratic	Benjamin Hanley (incumbent)	12,165	63.01%
Republican	Daniel Peaches (incumbent)	7,140	36.99%
Total votes		19,305	100.00%
Democratic hold			
Republican hold			

=== District 4 ===
Primary Election Results
Party	Candidate	Votes	%
Democratic Party Primary Results
Democratic	E. C. "Polly" Rosenbaum (incumbent)	7,465	36.38%
Democratic	Edward G. "Bunch" Guerrero (incumbent)	6,665	32.49%
Democratic	Donna McKinney Patzke	3,666	17.87%
Democratic	Velasquez W. Sneezy, Sr.	2,721	13.26%
Total votes		20,517	100.00%
Republican Party Primary Results
Republican	Jack D. Brown	2,450	50.64%
Republican	John A. Collings	2,388	49.36%
Total votes		4,838	100.00%

General Election Results
Party	Candidate	Votes	%
Democratic	E. C. "Polly" Rosenbaum (incumbent)	13,410	33.06%
Democratic	Edward G. "Bunch" Guerrero (incumbent)	11,287	27.83%
Republican	John A. Collings	8,179	20.16%
Republican	Jack D. Brown	7,685	18.95%
Total votes		40,561	100.00%
Democratic hold			
Democratic hold			

=== District 5 ===
Primary Election Results
Party	Candidate	Votes	%
Democratic Party Primary Results
Democratic	Frank McElhaney (incumbent)	3,383	55.08%
Democratic	Robert J. "Bob" McLendon	2,759	44.92%
Total votes		6,142	100.00%
Republican Party Primary Results
Republican	Morris "Court" Courtright (incumbent)	2,295	100.00%
Total votes		2,295	100.00%

General Election Results
Party	Candidate	Votes	%
Democratic	Frank McElhaney (incumbent)	10,745	36.63%
Democratic	Robert J. "Bob" McLendon	9,428	32.14%
Republican	Morris "Court" Courtright (incumbent)	9,162	31.23%
Total votes		29,335	100.00%
Democratic hold			
Democratic gain from Republican			

=== District 6 ===
Primary Election Results
Party	Candidate	Votes	%
Democratic Party Primary Results
Democratic	Henry Evans	3,631	33.76%
Democratic	Enrique "Henry" Celaya	3,551	33.02%
Democratic	Guy H. McMurry	2,296	21.35%
Democratic	Robert Kamman	1,276	11.87%
Total votes		10,754	100.00%
Republican Party Primary Results
Republican	Jim Hartdegen (incumbent)	2,943	67.39%
Republican	A. Mac Carvalho	1,424	32.61%
Total votes		4,367	100.00%

General Election Results
Party	Candidate	Votes	%
Democratic	Henry Evans	9,364	30.81%
Republican	Jim Hartdegen (incumbent)	9,076	29.87%
Democratic	Enrique "Henry" Celaya	7,844	25.81%
Republican	A. Mac Carvalho	4,105	13.51%
Total votes		30,389	100.00%
Democratic hold			
Republican hold			

=== District 7 ===
Primary Election Results
Party	Candidate	Votes	%
Democratic Party Primary Results
Democratic	Richard "Dick" Pacheco (incumbent)	5,262	32.62%
Democratic	Roy Hudson	4,838	29.99%
Democratic	Hugh Smith	4,333	26.86%
Democratic	John Sigala	1,698	10.53%
Total votes		16,131	100.00%
Republican Party Primary Results
Republican	George W. Kline (incumbent)	2,494	100.00%
Total votes		2,494	100.00%

General Election Results
Party	Candidate	Votes	%
Democratic	Roy Hudson	10,815	36.37%
Democratic	Richard "Dick" Pacheco (incumbent)	10,802	36.32%
Republican	George W. Kline (incumbent)	8,122	27.31%
Total votes		29,739	100.00%
Democratic hold			
Democratic gain from Republican			

=== District 8 ===
Primary Election Results
Party	Candidate	Votes	%
Democratic Party Primary Results
Democratic	Steve J. Vukcevich (incumbent)	8,955	61.70%
Democratic	Gus Arzberger	5,558	38.30%
Total votes		14,513	100.00%
Republican Party Primary Results
Republican	Joe Lane (incumbent)	3,226	99.48%
Republican	Steven Porter (Note: Was a write-in candidate in the primary election.)	17	0.52%
Total votes		3,243	100.00%

General Election Results
Party	Candidate	Votes	%
Democratic	Steve J. Vukcevich (incumbent)	12,057	32.13%
Republican	Joe Lane (incumbent)	10,944	29.16%
Democratic	Gus Arzberger	9,227	24.59%
Republican	Steven Porter	5,303	14.13%
Total votes		37,531	100.00%
Democratic hold			
Republican hold			

=== District 9 ===
Primary Election Results
Party	Candidate	Votes	%
Democratic Party Primary Results
Democratic	Suzanne E. Caldarello	3,701	50.94%
Democratic	Mark O. Mills	3,564	49.06%
Total votes		7,265	100.00%
Republican Party Primary Results
Republican	Bill English (incumbent)	5,425	54.44%
Republican	Bart Baker (incumbent)	4,541	45.56%
Total votes		9,966	100.00%
Libertarian Party Primary Results
Libertarian	Richard G. Rose	21	100.00%
Total votes		21	100.00%

General Election Results
Party	Candidate	Votes	%
Republican	Bill English (incumbent)	15,199	31.25%
Republican	Bart Baker (incumbent)	13,019	26.77%
Democratic	Suzanne E. Caldarello	10,965	22.54%
Democratic	Mark O. Mills	8,129	16.71%
Libertarian	Richard G. Rose	1,328	2.73%
Total votes		48,640	100.00%
Republican hold			
Republican hold			

=== District 10 ===
Primary Election Results
Party	Candidate	Votes	%
Democratic Party Primary Results
Democratic	Carmen F. Cajero (incumbent)	3,072	32.43%
Democratic	Jesus "Chuy" Higuera (incumbent)	2,515	26.55%
Democratic	William "Bill" Corbett	2,332	24.61%
Democratic	Cora Esquibel	1,555	16.41%
Total votes		9,474	100.00%
Libertarian Party Primary Results
Libertarian	Terry J. Orgill	14	100.00%
Total votes		14	100.00%

General Election Results
Party	Candidate	Votes	%
Democratic	Carmen F. Cajero (incumbent)	10,151	46.10%
Democratic	Jesus "Chuy" Higuera (incumbent)	8,621	39.15%
Libertarian	Terry J. Orgill	3,249	14.75%
Total votes		22,021	100.00%
Democratic hold			
Democratic hold			

=== District 11 ===
Primary Election Results
Party	Candidate	Votes	%
Democratic Party Primary Results
Democratic	Peter Goudinoff (incumbent)	3,925	34.70%
Democratic	John Kromko	3,844	33.98%
Democratic	Michael Hansen	1,478	13.07%
Democratic	Richard C. Palmer	1,167	10.32%
Democratic	Ed Finkelstein	898	7.94%
Total votes		11,312	100.00%
Republican Party Primary Results
Republican	Mike Morales (incumbent)	2,508	100.00%
Total votes		2,508	100.00%

General Election Results
Party	Candidate	Votes	%
Democratic	Peter Goudinoff (incumbent)	12,791	37.04%
Democratic	John Kromko	11,559	33.47%
Republican	Mike Morales (incumbent)	10,183	29.49%
Total votes		34,533	100.00%
Democratic hold			
Democratic gain from Republican			

=== District 12 ===
Primary Election Results
Party	Candidate	Votes	%
Democratic Party Primary Results
Democratic	Gordon Fuller	4,249	55.78%
Democratic	William E. Minette	3,369	44.22%
Total votes		7,618	100.00%
Republican Party Primary Results
Republican	Pete Hershberger	4,584	36.50%
Republican	Jack B. Jewett	4,216	33.57%
Republican	Thomas N. "Tom" Goodwin (incumbent)	2,334	18.58%
Republican	Samuel Winchester Morey	1,426	11.35%
Total votes		12,560	100.00%

General Election Results
Party	Candidate	Votes	%
Republican	Pete Hershberger	14,722	26.42%
Republican	Jack B. Jewett	14,213	25.51%
Democratic	Gordon Fuller	13,729	24.64%
Democratic	William E. Minette	13,053	23.43%
Total votes		55,717	100.00%
Republican hold			
Republican hold			

=== District 13 ===
Primary Election Results
Party	Candidate	Votes	%
Democratic Party Primary Results
Democratic	David C. Bartlett	5,056	41.37%
Democratic	Andy Nichols	4,236	34.66%
Democratic	Helen Grace Carlson	2,209	18.08%
Democratic	Bodie Knecht	720	5.89%
Total votes		12,221	100.00%
Republican Party Primary Results
Republican	Larry Hawke (incumbent)	5,978	60.68%
Republican	Dave Noel	3,873	39.32%
Total votes		9,851	100.00%
Libertarian Party Primary Results
Libertarian	Herbert C. Johnson	21	100.00%
Total votes		21	100.00%

General Election Results
Party	Candidate	Votes	%
Republican	Larry Hawke (incumbent)	16,816	28.22%
Democratic	David C. Bartlett	14,786	24.81%
Republican	Dave Noel	13,446	22.56%
Democratic	Andy Nichols	12,921	21.68%
Libertarian	Herbert C. Johnson	1,626	2.73%
Total votes		59,595	100.00%
Republican hold			
Democratic hold			

=== District 14 ===
Primary Election Results
Party	Candidate	Votes	%
Democratic Party Primary Results
Democratic	Cindy L. Resnick	4,394	58.63%
Democratic	Terry James Lehrling	3,100	41.37%
Total votes		7,494	100.00%
Republican Party Primary Results
Republican	Elizabeth H. "Lew" Macy (incumbent)	3,023	23.79%
Republican	Jim Green	3,023	23.79%
Republican	Joe McKeon	2,487	19.57%
Republican	Frank Evans	2,136	16.81%
Republican	Thomas "Tam" Kincaid	2,037	16.03%
Total votes		12,706	100.00%

General Election Results
Party	Candidate	Votes	%
Republican	Jim Green	13,812	27.55%
Democratic	Cindy L. Resnick	13,230	26.39%
Republican	Elizabeth H. "Lew" Macy (incumbent)	13,214	26.36%
Democratic	Terry James Lehrling	9,881	19.71%
Total votes		50,137	100.00%
Republican hold			
Democratic gain from Republican			

=== District 15 ===
Primary Election Results
Party	Candidate	Votes	%
Democratic Party Primary Results
Democratic	J. Weatherby	110	53.66%
Democratic	D. R. Peiffer	95	46.34%
Total votes		205	100.00%
Republican Party Primary Results
Republican	James B. Ratliff (incumbent)	5,481	41.22%
Republican	Bob Denny (incumbent)	5,175	38.92%
Republican	Ray Stedron	2,640	19.86%
Total votes		13,296	100.00%

General Election Results
Party	Candidate	Votes	%
Republican	Bob Denny (incumbent)	15,129	33.73%
Republican	James B. Ratliff (incumbent)	14,796	32.99%
Democratic	J. Weatherby	7,631	17.02%
Democratic	D. R. Peiffer	7,291	16.26%
Total votes		44,847	100.00%
Republican hold			
Republican hold			

=== District 16 ===
Primary Election Results
Party	Candidate	Votes	%
Democratic Party Primary Results
Democratic	Don Michelsen	2,935	100.00%
Total votes		2,935	100.00%
Republican Party Primary Results
Republican	Bob Hungerford (incumbent)	4,314	50.40%
Republican	Rhonda Thomas (incumbent)	3,843	44.89%
Republican	Al "King Alfonso" Lizanetz	403	4.71%
Total votes		8,560	100.00%
Libertarian Party Primary Results
Libertarian	Stephen "Speedy" Clark	15	100.00%
Total votes		15	100.00%

General Election Results
Party	Candidate	Votes	%
Republican	Bob Hungerford (incumbent)	15,193	37.87%
Republican	Rhonda Thomas (incumbent)	14,507	36.16%
Democratic	Don Michelsen	8,561	21.34%
Libertarian	Stephen "Speedy" Clark	1,862	4.64%
Total votes		40,123	100.00%
Republican hold			
Republican hold			

=== District 17 ===
Primary Election Results
Party	Candidate	Votes	%
Democratic Party Primary Results
Democratic	Justin "Jed" Smith	3,039	100.00%
Total votes		3,039	100.00%
Republican Party Primary Results
Republican	Patricia "Pat" Wright (incumbent)	6,458	40.81%
Republican	Sterling Ridge	3,401	21.49%
Republican	C. W. "Bill" Lewis (incumbent)	2,765	17.47%
Republican	Robert E. Donovan	2,497	15.78%
Republican	Lenny G. Letcher	702	4.44%
Total votes		15,823	100.00%

General Election Results
Party	Candidate	Votes	%
Republican	Patricia "Pat" Wright (incumbent)	18,815	42.47%
Republican	Sterling Ridge	16,275	36.74%
Democratic	Justin "Jed" Smith	9,213	20.80%
Total votes		44,303	100.00%
Republican hold			
Republican hold			

=== District 18 ===
Primary Election Results
Party	Candidate	Votes	%
Democratic Party Primary Results
Democratic	Phyllis Hawkins	2,366	42.06%
Democratic	Terry Edward Choate	1,719	30.56%
Democratic	K. G. "Kenny" Hagin	1,540	27.38%
Total votes		5,625	100.00%
Republican Party Primary Results
Republican	Burton S. Barr (incumbent)	6,129	54.85%
Republican	Jane Dee Hull (incumbent)	5,046	45.15%
Total votes		11,175	100.00%

General Election Results
Party	Candidate	Votes	%
Republican	Burton S. Barr (incumbent)	16,859	34.90%
Republican	Jane Dee Hull (incumbent)	14,809	30.65%
Democratic	Phillis Hawkins	9,361	19.38%
Democratic	Terry Edward Choate	7,283	15.07%
Total votes		48,312	100.00%
Republican hold			
Republican hold			

=== District 19 ===
Primary Election Results
Party	Candidate	Votes	%
Democratic Party Primary Results
Democratic	Cindy Roberts	2,091	42.48%
Democratic	M. L. "Peggy" Horacek	1,537	31.23%
Democratic	Cyril "Cy" Wadzita	1,294	26.29%
Total votes		4,922	100.00%
Republican Party Primary Results
Republican	Nancy Wessel	5,158	46.21%
Republican	Jan Brewer	4,477	40.11%
Republican	Merle Wackerbarth	1,526	13.67%
Total votes		11,161	100.00%

General Election Results
Party	Candidate	Votes	%
Republican	Nancy Wessel	15,468	33.32%
Republican	Jan Brewer	15,394	33.16%
Democratic	Cindy Roberts	8,275	17.82%
Democratic	M. L. "Peggy" Horacek	7,290	15.70%
Total votes		46,427	100.00%
Republican hold			
Republican hold			

=== District 20 ===
Primary Election Results
Party	Candidate	Votes	%
Democratic Party Primary Results
Democratic	Debbie McCune (incumbent)	3,453	53.41%
Democratic	Glenn Davis (incumbent)	3,012	46.59%
Total votes		6,465	100.00%
Republican Party Primary Results
Republican	Royann Jordan	3,286	56.17%
Republican	Violet Gibbs	2,564	43.83%
Total votes		5,850	100.00%

General Election Results
Party	Candidate	Votes	%
Democratic	Debbie McCune (incumbent)	12,162	30.58%
Democratic	Glenn Davis (incumbent)	11,291	28.39%
Republican	Royann Jordan	9,140	22.99%
Republican	Violet Gibbs	7,172	18.04%
Total votes		39,765	100.00%
Democratic hold			
Democratic gain from Republican			

=== District 21 ===
Primary Election Results
Party	Candidate	Votes	%
Democratic Party Primary Results
Democratic	John Warren Foster	2,167	53.88%
Democratic	Russ Hanks	1,855	46.12%
Total votes		4,022	100.00%
Republican Party Primary Results
Republican	Henry H. Haws	4,812	34.27%
Republican	Leslie Whiting Johnson	3,609	25.70%
Republican	Bob Broughton	3,329	23.71%
Republican	Ron Griffith	2,291	16.32%
Total votes		14,041	100.00%
Libertarian Party Primary Results
Libertarian	Steve Machol	3	100.00%
Total votes		3	100.00%

General Election Results
Party	Candidate	Votes	%
Republican	Henry H. Haws	13,798	33.08%
Republican	Leslie Whiting Johnson	12,712	30.48%
Democratic	John Warren Foster	7,364	17.66%
Democratic	Russ Hanks	6,805	16.32%
Libertarian	Steve Machol	1,030	2.47%
Total votes		41,709	100.00%
Republican hold			
Republican hold			

=== District 22 ===
Primary Election Results
Party	Candidate	Votes	%
Democratic Party Primary Results
Democratic	Art Hamilton (incumbent)	2,660	51.82%
Democratic	Earl V. Wilcox (incumbent)	2,473	48.18%
Total votes		5,133	100.00%
Libertarian Party Primary Results
Libertarian	Jack Jones	10	100.00%
Total votes		10	100.00%

General Election Results
Party	Candidate	Votes	%
Democratic	Art Hamilton (incumbent)	7,960	45.82%
Democratic	Earl V. Wilcox (incumbent)	7,751	44.62%
Libertarian	Jack Jones	1,662	9.57%
Total votes		17,373	100.00%
Democratic hold			
Democratic hold			

=== District 23 ===
Primary Election Results
Party	Candidate	Votes	%
Democratic Party Primary Results
Democratic	Carolyn Walker	2,175	20.38%
Democratic	Armando Ruiz	2,126	19.93%
Democratic	Renz D. Jennings (incumbent)	1,759	16.49%
Democratic	Tony R. Abril, Sr. (incumbent)	1,697	15.90%
Democratic	Leon Thompson Jr.	1,118	10.48%
Democratic	Ossie Owens	1,075	10.07%
Democratic	Ben Moreno Jr.	720	6.75%
Total votes		10,670	100.00%
Republican Party Primary Results
Republican	Maxine Provost Brubaker	1,013	99.90%
Republican	Roderick A. Jacobsen	1	0.10%
Total votes		1,014	100.00%
Libertarian Party Primary Results
Libertarian	Karen Emden	23	85.19%
Libertarian	James Eric Weightman	4	14.81%
Total votes		27	100.00%

General Election Results
Party	Candidate	Votes	%
Democratic	Carolyn Walker	7,616	37.46%
Democratic	Armando Ruiz	6,998	34.42%
Republican	Maxine Provost Brubaker	2,311	11.37%
Republican	Roderick A. Jacobsen	2,076	10.21%
Libertarian	Karen Emden	738	3.63%
Libertarian	James Eric Weightman	590	2.90%
Total votes		20,329	100.00%
Democratic hold			
Democratic hold			

=== District 24 ===
Primary Election Results
Party	Candidate	Votes	%
Democratic Party Primary Results
Democratic	Lyn B. Hall	2,324	98.94%
Democratic	Linda Becker	25	1.06%
Total votes		2,349	100.00%
Republican Party Primary Results
Republican	Chris Herstam	3,779	39.13%
Republican	Cal Holman (incumbent)	3,036	31.44%
Republican	Gary S. Giordano	2,842	29.43%
Total votes		9,657	100.00%
Libertarian Party Primary Results
Libertarian	Kathy Harrer	18	52.94%
Libertarian	John Webster Harrer	16	47.06%
Total votes		34	100.00%

General Election Results
Party	Candidate	Votes	%
Republican	Chris Herstam	13,619	30.46%
Republican	Cal Holman (incumbent)	12,913	28.88%
Democratic	Linda Becker	7,935	17.75%
Democratic	Lyn B. Hall	7,089	15.86%
Libertarian	Kathy Harrer	1,730	3.87%
Libertarian	John Webster Harrer	1,423	3.18%
Total votes		44,709	100.00%
Republican hold			
Republican hold			

=== District 25 ===
Primary Election Results
Party	Candidate	Votes	%
Democratic Party Primary Results
Democratic	Steve Tidler	3,875	95.33%
Democratic	Wayne Doty	135	3.32%
Democratic	Jerry Denomme	55	1.35%
Total votes		4,065	100.00%
Republican Party Primary Results
Republican	Don Kenney (incumbent)	3,875	32.52%
Republican	Elizabeth Adams Rockwell (incumbent)	3,869	32.47%
Republican	Claire Duff	2,250	18.88%
Republican	W. Jack Kelly	1,923	16.14%
Total votes		11,917	100.00%
Libertarian Party Primary Results
Libertarian	Marjorie Groce	37	100.00%
Total votes		37	100.00%

General Election Results
Party	Candidate	Votes	%
Republican	Don Kenney (incumbent)	14,248	31.12%
Republican	Elizabeth Adams Rockwell (incumbent)	13,390	29.25%
Democratic	Steve Tidler	8,310	18.15%
Democratic	Wayne Doty	8,112	17.72%
Libertarian	Marjorie Groce	1,718	3.75%
Total votes		45,778	100.00%
Republican hold			
Republican gain from Democratic			

=== District 26 ===
Primary Election Results
Party	Candidate	Votes	%
Democratic Party Primary Results
Democratic	George Hetrick	3,476	100.00%
Total votes		3,476	100.00%
Republican Party Primary Results
Republican	Jim Meredith (incumbent)	6,899	50.74%
Republican	Frank Kelley (incumbent)	6,698	49.26%
Total votes		13,597	100.00%

General Election Results
Party	Candidate	Votes	%
Republican	Jim Meredith (incumbent)	18,336	40.51%
Republican	Frank Kelley (incumbent)	17,587	38.86%
Democratic	George Hetrick	9,338	20.63%
Total votes		45,261	100.00%
Republican hold			
Republican hold			

=== District 27 ===
Primary Election Results
Party	Candidate	Votes	%
Democratic Party Primary Results
Democratic	Jo Ann G. Pedrick	3,003	98.91%
Democratic	Dwight Langham	33	1.09%
Total votes		3,036	100.00%
Republican Party Primary Results
Republican	Doug Todd (incumbent)	6,091	54.63%
Republican	Bev Hermon	5,059	45.37%
Total votes		11,150	100.00%

General Election Results
Party	Candidate	Votes	%
Republican	Doug Todd (incumbent)	13,539	31.26%
Republican	Bev Hermon	13,146	30.35%
Democratic	Jo Ann G. Pedrick	10,353	23.90%
Democratic	Dwight Langham	6,274	14.49%
Total votes		43,312	100.00%
Republican hold			
Republican hold			

=== District 28 ===
Primary Election Results
Party	Candidate	Votes	%
Democratic Party Primary Results
Democratic	Fred E. Tenney	2,179	100.00%
Total votes		2,179	100.00%
Republican Party Primary Results
Republican	Paul R. Messinger (incumbent)	6,455	52.19%
Republican	Jim Skelly (incumbent)	5,913	47.81%
Total votes		12,368	100.00%
Libertarian Party Primary Results
Libertarian	Duncan Dodge	23	100.00%
Total votes		23	100.00%

General Election Results
Party	Candidate	Votes	%
Republican	Paul R. Messinger (incumbent)	21,069	40.86%
Republican	Jim Skelly (incumbent)	19,287	37.41%
Democratic	Fred E. Tenney	8,465	16.42%
Libertarian	Duncan Dodge	2,737	5.31%
Total votes		51,558	100.00%
Republican hold			
Republican hold			

=== District 29 ===
Primary Election Results
Party	Candidate	Votes	%
Democratic Party Primary Results
Democratic	Diane Swart Calderón	2,298	99.31%
Democratic	Jo Taft	16	0.69%
Total votes		2,314	100.00%
Republican Party Primary Results
Republican	Jim Cooper (incumbent)	6,362	40.46%
Republican	Lela Steffey	5,675	36.09%
Republican	Becky Buehl	3,689	23.46%
Total votes		15,726	100.00%

General Election Results
Party	Candidate	Votes	%
Republican	Jim Cooper (incumbent)	12,973	35.56%
Republican	Lela Steffey	12,645	34.66%
Democratic	Diane Swart Calderón	6,236	17.09%
Democratic	Jo Taft	4,631	12.69%
Total votes		36,485	100.00%
Republican hold			
Republican hold			

=== District 30 ===
Primary Election Results
Party	Candidate	Votes	%
Democratic Party Primary Results
Democratic	Wayne Thomas Pelzer	2,067	100.00%
Total votes		2,067	100.00%
Republican Party Primary Results
Republican	Mark W. Killian	3,818	27.37%
Republican	James J. Sossaman (incumbent)	3,805	27.28%
Republican	Dan Coury	2,534	18.16%
Republican	Morris P. Cooper	1,913	13.71%
Republican	Larry J. Chesley	1,880	13.48%
Total votes		13,950	100.00%

General Election Results
Party	Candidate	Votes	%
Republican	Mark W. Killian	14,690	41.61%
Republican	James J. Sossaman (incumbent)	14,394	40.78%
Democratic	Wayne Thomas Pelzer	6,216	17.61%
Total votes		35,300	100.00%
Republican hold			
Republican hold			
