= General Owens =

General Owens may refer to:

- Donald L. Owens (1930–2012), Arizona Air National Guard commanding general
- Ira C. Owens (born 1936), U.S. Army lieutenant general
- Robert G. Owens Jr. (1917–2007), U.S. Marine Corps major general

== See also ==
- General Owen (disambiguation)
