= General Owen =

General Owen may refer to:

- David Lloyd Owen (1917–2001), British Army major general
- John Owen (Royal Marines officer) (1777–1857), Royal Marines lieutenant general
- Joshua T. Owen (1822–1887), Union Army brigadier general

== See also ==
- General Owens (disambiguation)
