= 2010 Arizona Proposition 100 =

Ballot measure to raise the Arizona state sales tax

Arizona Proposition 100 (2010)
- May 18, 2010
- Arizona Sales Tax Increase
- Outcome: Pass

Results
Choice	Votes	%
Yes	750,850	64.32%
No	416,571	35.68%
County results
For
70–80%
60–70%
50–60%
Against
50–60%

Proposition 100 was a ballot measure to temporarily raise the Arizona state sales tax by 1 cent per dollar, with the proceeds going to education, public safety, and health and human services. The referendum was passed by voters in a special election on May 18, 2010. The measure amended Article IX of the Arizona State Constitution, raising the state sales tax from 5.6% to 6.6%, and included a clause which would automatically repeal the increase on May 31, 2013. Two-thirds of the revenue was designated for primary and secondary education, while one-third of the revenue was designated for both health and human services and public safety.

== History ==
The resolution to put Proposition 100 on the ballot was passed on February 4, 2010, as Senate Concurrent Resolution 1001 in the sixth special session of the 49th Arizona Legislature. The bill to hold the special election was sponsored by seven senators, four Republicans and three Democrats. The final vote was 20 to 8, with two members vacant. Arizona Governor Jan Brewer supported the bill.

== Results ==
Proposition 100
Choice	Votes	%
For	750,850	64.32
Against	416,571	35.68
Total	1,167,421	100.00
Registered voters/turnout		36.2

== Controversy ==
The potential effects of Proposition 100 were disputed at the time. The Arizona Education Network, a nonpartisan education advocacy organization, estimated that 15–20% of primary and secondary classroom teachers were likely to be eliminated if it did not pass. Economic analysis indicated passage would help save 13,000 jobs in both private and public sectors of the economy. Arizona's three state universities, Arizona State University, The University of Arizona, and Northern Arizona University, were estimated to face an additional budget cut of $107 million if Proposition 100 failed, along with a $15 million cut to community colleges.

Critics of Proposition 100, which included the West Valley Tea Party Patriots and the National Federation of Independent Business, argued that higher taxes would take away freedom. Americans for Prosperity, a taxpayer advocacy group, argued that the proposition was not enough to cover the state deficit and projected 10–11% cuts in K-12 education if Prop. 100 failed.

The Arizona Republic, in an unsigned editorial, noted that some groups traditionally opposing tax increases, such as the Arizona Chamber of Commerce and Arizona Tax Research Association, were in support of Prop. 100. The proposition was opposed by both of Arizona's U.S. Senators, Jon Kyl and John McCain.
