= Jan Brewer =

Governor of Arizona from 2009 to 2015

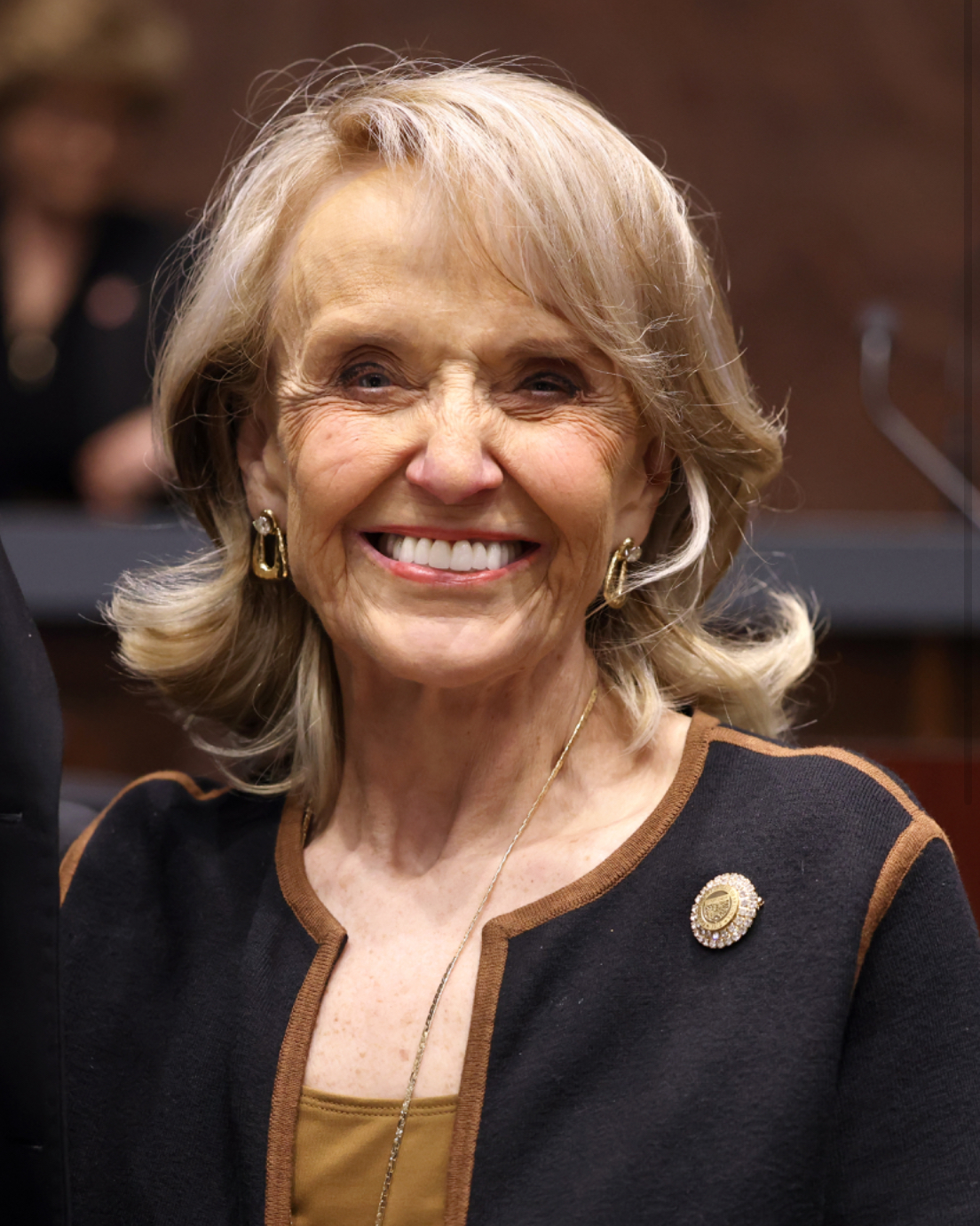
- Brewer in 2025

22nd Governor of Arizona
- In office January 21, 2009 – January 5, 2015
- Preceded by: Janet Napolitano
- Succeeded by: Doug Ducey

18th Secretary of State of Arizona
- In office January 6, 2003 – January 21, 2009
- Governor: Janet Napolitano
- Preceded by: Betsey Bayless
- Succeeded by: Ken Bennett

Member of the Maricopa County Board of Supervisors
- In office January 3, 1997 – January 6, 2003
- Preceded by: Ed King
- Succeeded by: Max Wilson

Member of the Arizona Senate from the 19th district
- In office January 6, 1987 – January 3, 1997
- Preceded by: Billy Davis
- Succeeded by: Scott Bundgaard

Member of the Arizona House of Representatives from the 19th district
- In office January 3, 1983 – January 6, 1987
- Preceded by: Jane Dee Hull
- Succeeded by: Don Kenney

Personal details
- Born: Janice Kay Drinkwine; September 26, 1944 (age 82) Los Angeles, California, U.S.
- Party: Republican
- Spouse: John Brewer (m. 1970)
- Children: 3
- Education: Glendale Community College (attended)

Janice Kay Brewer (née Drinkwine; born September 26, 1944) is an American politician who served as the 22nd governor of Arizona from 2009 to 2015, as a member of the Republican Party. Prior to this, Brewer was a member of the Arizona House of Representatives, Arizona Senate, and Maricopa County Board of Supervisors, and served as Secretary of State of Arizona from 2003 to 2009.

Born in California, Brewer graduated from Glendale Community College and moved to Arizona. She ran for a seat in the state house to influence education policy while her children were in school. In the Arizona Senate she became majority whip in 1993, and was known for her proposals to put content warnings on profane albums and to create a position of lieutenant governor so the secretary of state would not be next in line to the governorship. Brewer became chair of the Maricopa County Board of Supervisors in 1997, after campaigning on opposition to a tax it levied.

Elected as secretary of state in 2003, Brewer served until she assumed the governorship as part of the line of succession when Governor Janet Napolitano resigned to become U.S. Secretary of Homeland Security. Brewer was responsible for addressing the state's deficit. She authorized spending cuts and pushed for a sales tax that was unpopular with her party but approved by referendum. Brewer became a national political figure in 2010 when she signed SB 1070 into law, authorizing the strictest immigration policy in the United States. The law boosted her appeal within the Republican Party, and she was elected to a full term later that year. Brewer was a prominent opponent of President Barack Obama, especially on immigration and healthcare, such that an image of her waving her finger at Obama on an airport tarmac became an iconic representation of her political career. Despite opposing his Affordable Care Act, Brewer forced her party to pass its Medicaid expansion in Arizona by refusing to sign any laws until it was done. Brewer received national attention again when she vetoed SB 1062, which would have legalized discrimination on the basis of sexual orientation in Arizona. Other policies implemented by Brewer included performance-based funding for public schools, Child Protective Services reform, at-will employment for government employees, and loosened restrictions on concealed carry.

Brewer disputed that she was term limited in 2014 as she had only served part of her first term, but she chose not to run for reelection and was succeeded by Doug Ducey. During the 2016 presidential election she campaigned for Donald Trump and was considered a possible running mate for him. She distanced herself from Trumpism through her opposition to the American Health Care Act and the attempts to overturn the 2020 presidential election, but continued to endorse Trump.

== Early life, education and family ==
Jan Brewer was born Janice Kay Drinkwine on September 26, 1944, to Edna Clarice (née Bakken) and Perry Wilford Drinkwine in Hollywood, Los Angeles. Brewer's father worked at a United States Navy munitions depot in Hawthorne, Nevada, as a civilian supervisor. She lived with her parents and her brother Paul at the military base until she was ten years old, when her father was afflicted with lung cancer. They moved to Tujunga, Los Angeles, where her father died when she was eleven. Her mother opened a dress store to support the children, and Brewer helped her mother by cleaning, working the register, and keeping inventory. She graduated from Verdugo Hills High School in 1962.

Brewer attended Glendale Community College in California (Note: Brewer is sometimes described as attending Los Angeles Valley College.) and received a certificate as a radiological technician in 1963. Her decision to study radiology was influenced by her father's death from lung cancer. She married John Brewer in 1963 and they moved to Glendale, California. There she worked as an office manager to support John while he studied to become a chiropractor. The Brewers moved to Arizona in the early 1970s. They first resided in Phoenix, Arizona before settling in Glendale, Arizona, where John worked in chiropractic and real estate.

The Brewers had three children together: Ronald, John, and Michael. Brewer stayed home to raise them while John worked. Ronald was declared not guilty in a sexual assault case in 1989, and he was committed to a public mental health facility where he spent much of his life. His case file was sealed by a Phoenix judge shortly before Brewer became governor. John died of cancer during her second term as secretary of state in 2007, and Ronald died in 2018.

== Early political career ==
=== State legislature ===
Brewer began attending school board meetings in 1981. She wanted to take a more active role in how her children's education was governed, but she was unfamiliar with the political system and her husband explained to her how the school board worked. This sparked an interest in politics and she considered running for a school board seat in the Glendale Union High School District, feeling she could do better than the sitting members. When the seat for the 19th district of the Arizona House of Representatives became vacant, she decided this would give her a better position to affect education policy. She was elected to the seat in 1982. Brewer was one of several women, referred to as the "Republican wives", who were elected to the legislature this year. She was reelected in 1984 and was then elected to the Arizona Senate in 1986. Brewer was involved in a car crash in 1988, and was suspected of drunk driving, but she was not arrested because of legislative immunity. She became majority whip of the senate in 1993 and held this position until she left the senate in 1996.

As state senator, Brewer developed a reputation for bipartisanship and a willingness to pass legislation. Brewer favored tax cuts, opposed the creation of Martin Luther King Jr. Day, opposed the impeachment of Republican Governor Evan Mecham in 1988, and supported open enrollment for public schools as a form of school choice. Brewer pushed for a bill that would require albums to carry a warning if it contained obscene lyrics, but it was not passed. She also led a movement to block a monument for Vietnam War protesters which earned her the nickname Janbo, a reference to the film character John Rambo. She supported creating a position of lieutenant governor for Arizona so the Secretary of State of Arizona would not be next in line for the governorship. She argued that the secretary of state might not be qualified or might be a member of a different party.

=== Maricopa County Board of Supervisors ===
An unpopular sales tax increase to fund the construction of the Bank One Ballpark was passed by the Maricopa County Board of Supervisors. Brewer decided to run for a seat on the board in 1996, in response to this. She challenged the incumbent chair, Ed King, in a primary election and won his seat. Brewer supported a different sales tax to fund county jails and pushed for fiscal conservatism on the board as it addressed the county's $165 million debt that it had accumulated through bonds. She was the board chair for the mental health rehabilitation center Recovery Innovations of Arizona.

=== Secretary of State of Arizona ===
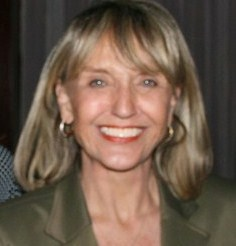
Brewer in 2008

In 2002, Brewer ran for secretary of state to replace outgoing secretary of state Betsey Bayless. She won the Republican primary election with 45% of the vote, defeating Phoenix councilman Sal DiCiccio and gubernatorial aide Sharon Collins, and defeated Democratic nominee Chris Cummiskey in the general election and was reelected in 2006.

As secretary of state, Brewer focused on voting reform. She came into conflict with Governor Janet Napolitano, who was a member of the Democratic Party. This included a dispute in 2003 when Napolitano tried to reallocate Brewer's office in Tucson. During the 2004 presidential election Brewer served as the co-chair of George W. Bush's campaign in Arizona.

== Governor of Arizona ==
=== Succession ===
Brewer became governor of Arizona on January 21, 2009. As secretary of state, Brewer was next in line for gubernatorial succession when Napolitano was confirmed as Secretary of Homeland Security in Barack Obama's administration. At the time, she was a political unknown. The Arizona legislature was controlled by Republicans affiliated with the Tea Party movement during Brewer's tenure. She rejected obstructionism as a political strategy and was willing to ignore the positions of the Republican's leadership if she felt it would be advantageous to implement a policy. Brewer's ascension to the governorship meant that the Republicans had a government trifecta. The change in power caused a shift in the state government's dynamic. Republican legislators had been willing to support their party on issues they disagreed with, knowing that Napolitano would veto these bills, but this was a riskier strategy under a Republican governor whose positions were not as well known.

Economic issues were Brewer's main focus when taking office. She became governor during the Great Recession, and Arizona had been heavily impacted by the collapse of the decade's housing bubble. It had become the poorest state in the nation along with Mississippi. In her inaugural address, Brewer promised to keep taxes low in Arizona, in an attempt to attract business from other states Despite this, she later decided that a raise in taxes was necessary to address the state's deficit. Two Republican legislators left the room in protest after she suggested this to the Arizona legislature. This fermented an adversarial relationship between Brewer and the legislature. The policy was criticized by both of Arizona's Republican U.S. Senators, John McCain and Jon Kyl. Anti-tax advocate Grover Norquist accused Brewer of using immigration to distract from her tax policy. It rejected her sales tax proposal in 2009, but then approved a referendum in February 2010. In response to the criticism from her party, she said it was more important to "do what was right" and impose the tax than to "be a politician" and "cover [her] backside". She was lambasted for calling the state's capital a "hellhole" out of frustration, not realizing she was on camera. By the time her sales tax was approved, Brewer's relations with the legislature had improved, and they agreed on a series of spending cuts. They revoked state health insurance for approximately 357,000 low-income Arizonans, closed state parks, and laid off hundreds of Arizona Motor Vehicle Department employees.

Brewer was at the center of several political conflicts between Arizona and the Obama administration. She criticized Obama on a personal level, feeling that his behavior toward her was condescending. She became an adversary of Obama, particularly in disputes over immigration policy. She made her opposition to Obama part of her political image to garner support among Republicans. Brewer had Arizona join other states in issuing a legal challenge against the Affordable Care Act (ACA).

=== 2010 election and SB 1070 ===
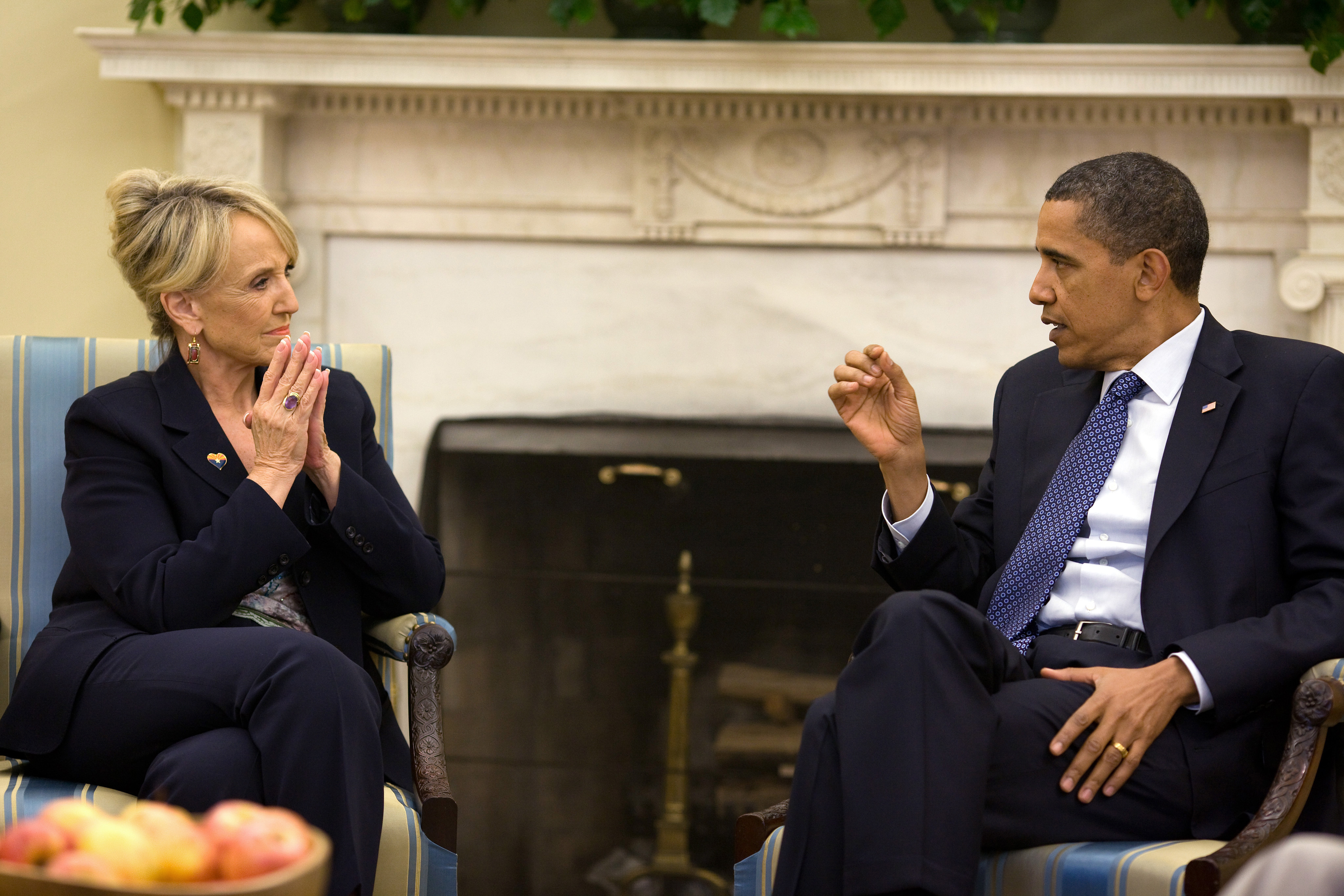
Governor Jan Brewer meeting with President Barack Obama in June 2010.

State treasurer Dean Martin launched a primary challenge against Brewer in the 2010 gubernatorial election in protest of her implementation of a sales tax. Polling by Rasmussen Reports found on March 23 that Martin was polling better than her in the Republican primary and that she was also polling poorly in the general election. She also faced a primary challenge from businessman Owen Mills.

The murder of Robert Krentz on March 27 triggered wide support for stronger immigration policy. Brewer made anti-immigration rhetoric a major aspect of her campaign. State legislator Russell Pearce took advantage of this to promote his immigration bill Arizona SB 1070. Though Brewer's office typically did not show interest in crafting legislation, it worked with Pearce to refine the bill. SB 1070 mandated that police check the residency status of anyone they suspect to be an undocumented immigrant, and it made it a crime for non-citizens to be in Arizona without carrying residency paperwork. SB 1070 received national media attention and was the subject of major protests as it went to Brewer for her to sign. Both Democrats and Republicans in Arizona were surprised by the sudden attention it received. Brewer was uncertain about whether to sign the bill and waited while political discourse took place. Her advisors warned her that vetoing the bill would likely cause her to lose her primary election, as she was already being criticized as not being conservative. She considered the issue for four days before deciding to sign the bill.

Brewer signed SB 1070 into law on April 23, codifying the strictest immigration laws in the United States. The bill became a national controversy. A majority of Americans supported the measure, while major opposition also emerged. Opponents launched nationwide protests and boycotts after it was signed, and lawsuits were filed against the bill shortly after. A court injunction blocked many of the bill's provisions. In an unsuccessful attempt to end the controversy, Brewer signed a follow-up bill days later that set new anti-discrimination standards for its enforcement. As the bill received national attention, Brewer became its main defender and emerged as one of the most prominent figures in the nation's immigration discourse. The bill's signature was followed by numerous television interviews for Brewer, including frequent appearances on the Fox News program On the Record with Greta Van Susteren. Brewer achieved more policy victories while the controversy went on: she signed several more immigration bills, and the referendum for her sales tax passed with 64% of the vote on May 18. She was invited to the White House for a discussion with President Obama on June 3 where they disagreed on state governments' role in immigration policy. Although she described the meeting in positive terms after it ended, she expressed her displeasure with it in her memoir.

In her memoir, Brewer described the resistance to her immigration policy as fighting a war and likened criticism of her to being waterboarded. She argued that the state government was rectifying failures of the federal government and was being unduly persecuted for its efforts. Brewer accused national critics of SB 1070 of wanting to see Arizona fail so they can "create headlines". When critics of the bill likened it to Nazism, Brewer falsely claimed that her father had died fighting Nazi Germany despite having lived for another ten years after the war. She received bipartisan backlash when she said without evidence that a majority of undocumented immigrants from Mexico were involved in drug trafficking. Brewer also alleged that violence from the Mexican drug war had become common in Arizona, saying that terrorist attacks were taking place and that there were numerous beheaded corpses found in Arizona. She retracted this statement, but unsubstantiated claims of beheadings continued to be invoked by anti-immigration advocates.

SB 1070 was popular in Arizona and brought a significant improvement for her approval rating. Previously at 40%, her statewide approval rose to 56% in the bill's aftermath. Many Arizonans felt resentment for being described as racist by commentators from other states, and they came to see Brewer as their defender, earning her further support. The popularity of SB 1070 assured that she was her party's nominee in the gubernatorial election. Brewer won her primary election with 82% of the vote and went on to face Terry Goddard, the Attorney General of Arizona, in the general election. SB 1070 complicated Goddard's campaign not only because it brought Brewer ahead in the polls, but because his role as attorney general required him to defend Arizonan law in court. Brewer ordered that his power to represent Arizona in court be removed, and he accepted this decision despite arguing that it was unconstitutional. Goddard attacked Brewer for the national image that SB 1070 gave Arizona. During the campaign, false rumors were spread that Brewer was having health issues and that she was receiving illegal campaign contributions from state legislatures. She was widely ridiculed for a moment in a debate against Goddard where she gave a lengthy pause while speaking.

Brewer was elected in her own right on November 2, 2010, to the office of governor in the state's general election. She won with 54% of the vote, defeating Goddard's 42%. She was sworn in for a full term on January 3, 2011, at the Arizona State Capitol in Phoenix. Arizona Senate President Russell Pearce credited SB 1070 as the deciding factor in Brewer's election, saying that she would have lost otherwise. Her support among Latino voters was low, receiving only 28% of the Latino vote compared to the 40% Republican John McCain received in the 2010 U.S. Senate election in Arizona.

=== Second term ===
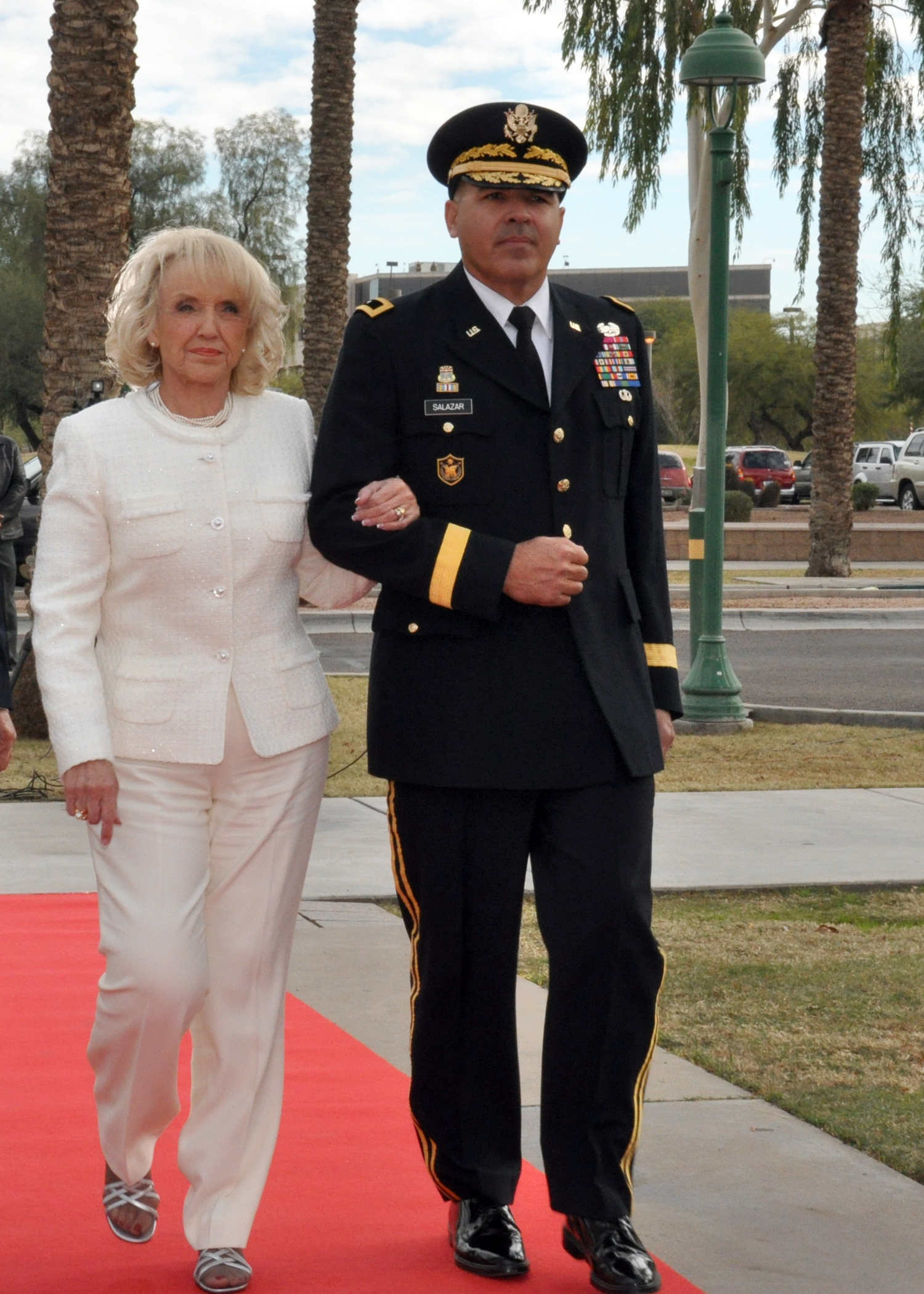
Brewer being escorted at her 2011 inauguration

Brewer appealed a court ruling against SB 1070 in 2011, petitioning the Supreme Court of the United States to hear the issue. This caused Arizona's immigration politics to become a national issue on the day of a Republican Party presidential debate. Arizona launched a countersuit against the federal government for failing to enforce immigration policy, but this was dismissed in October 2011. The court upheld the provision of SB 1070 requiring police to check for immigration status in June 2012. Time considered Brewer for its 2012 Time 100 list of influential figures for her role in the immigration debate, but she was not selected. As the controversy around SB 1070 faded, Brewer's approval rating fell to about 42%.

Arizona gained a seat in the U.S. House of Representatives after the 2010 United States census. The state's bipartisan redistricting commission—composed of two Democrats, two Republicans, and one independent member chosen by the other four to serve as chair—created a new electoral map for the state. Republicans criticized the new map as favoring the Democratic Party, so Brewer accused the independent chair Colleen Coyle Mathis of "gross misconduct" and refused to implement the redistricting. Brewer worked with the Arizona Senate to remove Mathis in November 2011. The commission took the issue to the Arizona Supreme Court, which ordered that Mathis be reinstated and rejected Brewer's attempt to void the electoral map.

Brewer wrote a memoir in 2011 titled Scorpions for Breakfast: My Fight Against Special Interests, Liberal Media, and Cynical Politicos to Secure America's Border. It was published November 2011 by Broadside Books. The majority of the book focused on her immigration policy and the controversy around SB 1070. Scorpions for Breakfast made her a New York Times Best Selling Author with the book reaching the New York Times Best Seller lists for e-book nonfiction and combined print and e-book nonfiction.

Brewer resumed her focus on Arizona's economy when she entered her second term, passing a budget with the Republican-controlled legislature in 2011 that cut spending by $1.1 billion. With the deficit resolved, she passed tax cuts in 2012 as a push to create new jobs. She vetoed many Republican bills in her second term, including a bill in 2011 that would have required presidential candidates to show a birth certificate to run in Arizona, which was supported by the Birther movement that accused Obama of secretly being a foreign national. The legislature refused to work with her on other issues because of these vetoes, rejecting her proposal to extend unemployment benefits. Brewer's 2010 sales tax expired in 2013.

Brewer wags her finger at Obama on a tarmac at Phoenix–Mesa Gateway Airport. This photo came to be seen as a defining moment of her governorship.

Brewer brought national attention to herself when she wagged her finger in Obama's face while speaking to him on an airport tarmac in January 2012. A photo of the incident was widely circulated and became an iconic image of her governorship. Brewer later said they were disagreeing over the contents of her book Scorpions for Breakfast, which caused sales to increase. During the 2012 Republican National Convention that August, Brewer caused shock when she accidentally stated that she hoped Obama would be reelected in the upcoming election. In another incident, she physically struck a reporter who asked her about climate change in December 2012. After this happened, she disappeared until it was found that she had taken an announced trip to Afghanistan with the Department of Defense.

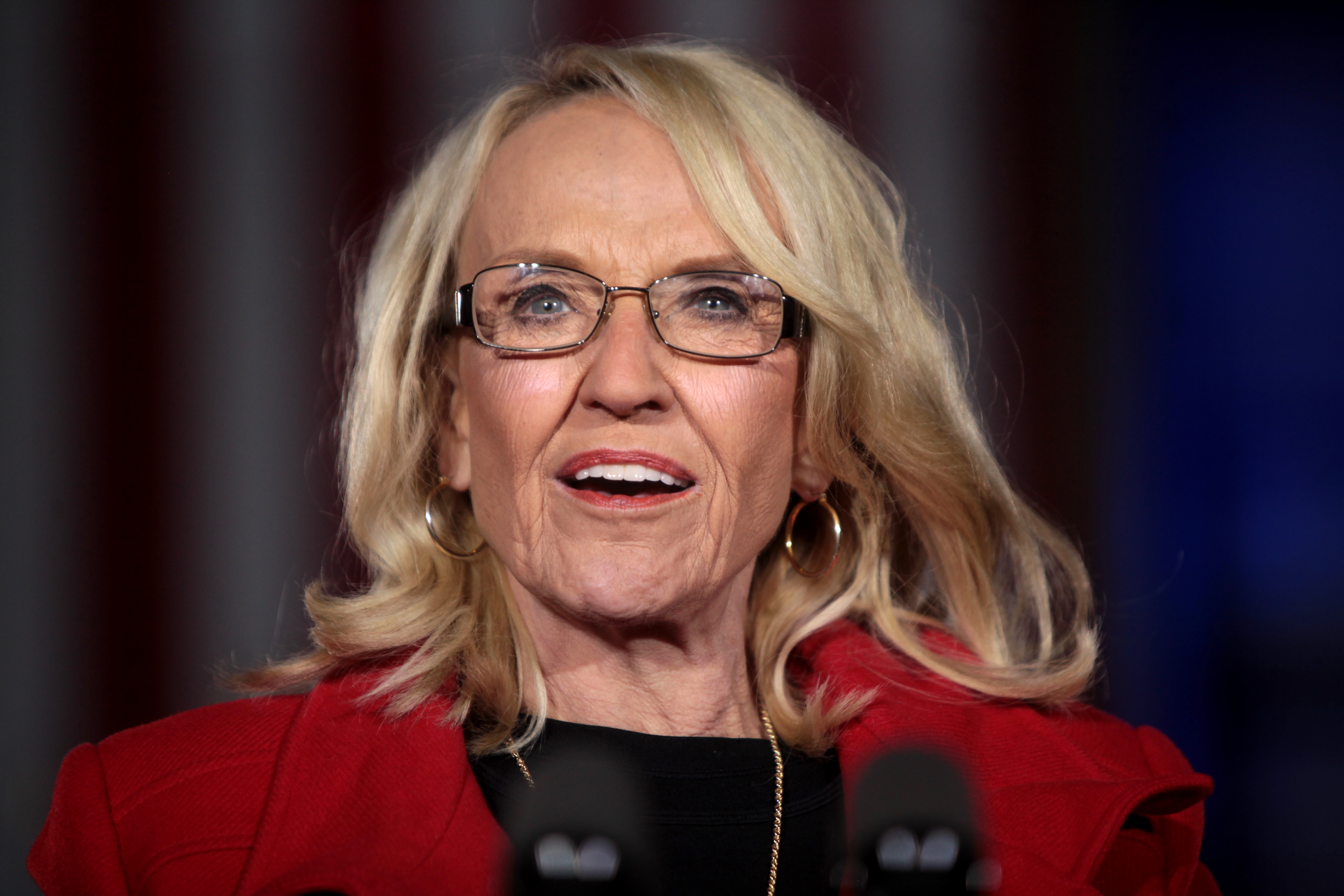
Brewer in 2014

Brewer challenged her own party on the issue of Medicaid expansion in early 2013. Many Republican governors rejected the expansion in the hope that it would limit the ACA's reach, but Brewer wished to accept it despite her opposition to the ACA. When the Republican-controlled Arizona State Legislature objected, Brewer began vetoing every bill they sent her until they approved the Medicaid expansion. This brought her in conflict with the Republican leader of the Arizona Senate, Andy Biggs, who was opposed by an alliance of Brewer's supporters and members of the Democratic Party. When negotiations failed, Brewer called a special session of the legislature in June 2013. Ten bills authorizing the expansion were passed, over the vocal objections from the Republican Party's conservative wing.

Arizona received wide attention with the passage of SB 1062, which would have made "sincerely held religious belief" a defense in discrimination lawsuits. It was criticized by supporters of gay rights and a controversy emerged. Two days after it was passed, Brewer held a press conference in the Rotunda of the Governor's Office and announced that she was vetoing the bill.

In November 2012, Brewer declared she was looking into what she called "ambiguity" in Arizona's term-limit law to seek a third term. Although the Constitution of Arizona sets term limits on the governor's office, Brewer argued that she was eligible for reelection because she only served a partial term before the 2010 election. She announced on March 12, 2014, that she would not seek a third term. Brewer endorsed Scott Smith, the mayor of Mesa, as her successor in the Republican gubernatorial primary election. Doug Ducey won the primary and then defeated Democrat Fred DuVal in the general election.

== Post-governorship ==
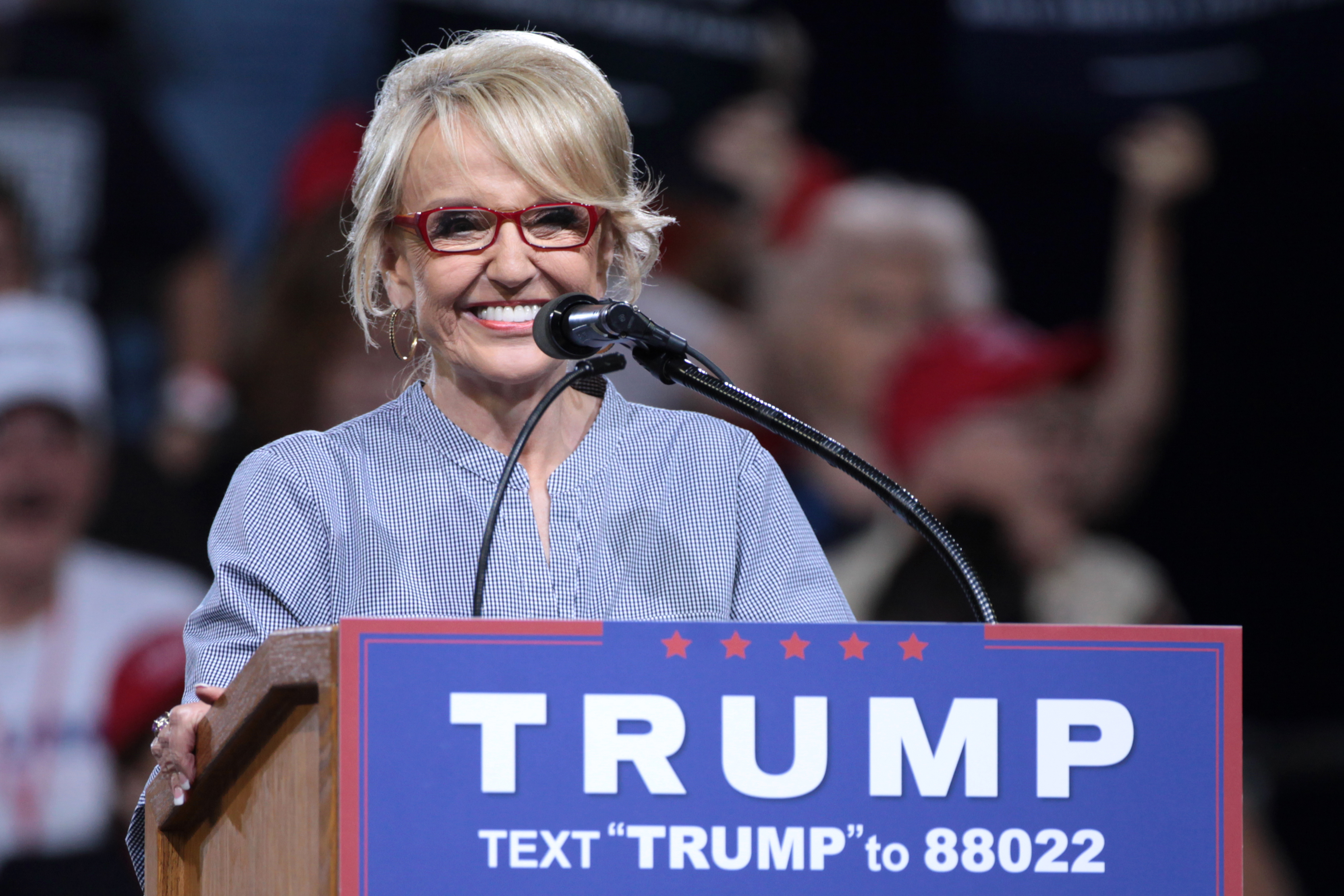
Brewer speaking at a 2016 campaign rally for Donald Trump and Mike Pence in Phoenix, Arizona

Brewer endorsed Donald Trump during his 2016 presidential campaign, praising his views on immigration. Her governorship has since been described as a precursor of Trump's presidency. Their immigration policies both shifted discourse toward treating illegal immigration as an emergency and appealing to public fear as a justification for more aggressive responses. Both shared an anti-establishment approach that rebutted the leadership of the Republican Party and rejected its platform of small government. There was speculation of Brewer being Trump's vice-presidential running mate in the 2016 presidential election. She was considered for a role in Trump's cabinet, and there were rumors that she was considered for Secretary of the Interior.

In late March 2017, during a phone interview, Brewer expressed opposition to President Trump's American Health Care Act: "This would devastate the most vulnerable, this would devastate rural hospitals, they will probably close down and those jobs would be lost". Immigration subsided as the top political issue in Arizona as Brewer's term ended. Her successor, Republican Doug Ducey, reversed her policy on banning drivers licenses for DACA recipients in 2019.

In the 2022 Arizona gubernatorial election, Brewer advised Republican nominee Kari Lake to stop discussing debunked claims of voter fraud in the 2020 United States presidential election and focus more on debating policy. Brewer preferred traditional conservative candidates in 2024 Republican primaries, endorsing them instead of candidates backed by Trump. She publicly rebuked Trump's false claims about election fraud but stated that she still intended to vote for him because she supported his other actions as president.

== Political positions ==
=== Economy ===
Brewer identified as a fiscal conservative during her political career. She became governor during the Great Recession and spent her governorship reversing Arizona's deficit of about $3 billion. To do this, she reduced spending by $1 billion, borrowed $1 billion in funding, and passed a sales tax to raise $1 billion. Although she was successful in eliminating the state's deficit, it returned toward the end of her term. Opponents blamed her support for SB 1070, her veto of a religious rights bill, and her corporate tax cuts for dissuading businesses from investing in the state.

Brewer supported an expansion of services while she was on the board of supervisors, and she directed funding toward medical facilities and homeless shelters. Her critics accused her of cutting funding for important services as governor, including education, mental health, and public safety, though she also vetoed the larger health and education cuts proposed by her party.

Brewer supported tax cuts as governor, and she was against raising taxes outside of her implementation of a sales tax that she deemed necessary. Brewer passed her economic development plan, titled the Arizona Competitiveness Package, in February 2011. It introduced tax cuts for businesses and replaced the Arizona Department of Commerce with a public-private Arizona Commerce Authority. Among other taxation policies, she enacted a tax cut for electric and natural gas companies, and she vetoed a bill in 2014 that would have expanded property tax exemptions for religious groups. After her governorship, Brewer opposed a 2021 bill that would have lowered income taxes with a permanent flat tax.

=== Education ===
Education was the issue that originally drew Brewer's interest to politics. She pushed for funding based on school performance based on a grading system, which her opponents said that this did not give enough funding to schools in poor communities. As part of her spending cuts at the beginning of her governorship, Brewer reduced spending on public schools by 2%. She vetoed any bills that would have made larger cuts to education spending. Brewer supported school choice in the form of open enrollment while she was in the state legislature and supported tax credits as governor so students can attend private schools, but she vetoed multiple school voucher bills out of concern that they would unduly influence the market.

Brewer signed HB 2881 on May 11, 2010, which withheld funding from any schools that taught resentment against a racial group or promoted the overthrow of the government. This was criticized as a means to attack ethnic studies in general, but the only race-based instruction challenged by the law was a program to support Mexican American students in the Tucson Unified School District.

In response to right-wing criticism of the federal Common Core curriculum, Brewer issued an executive order in 2013 saying that Arizona's school curriculum would be renamed to Arizona's College and Career Ready Standards. Although she said this was to retain state control over education, the same curriculum continued implementation.

=== Energy and environment ===
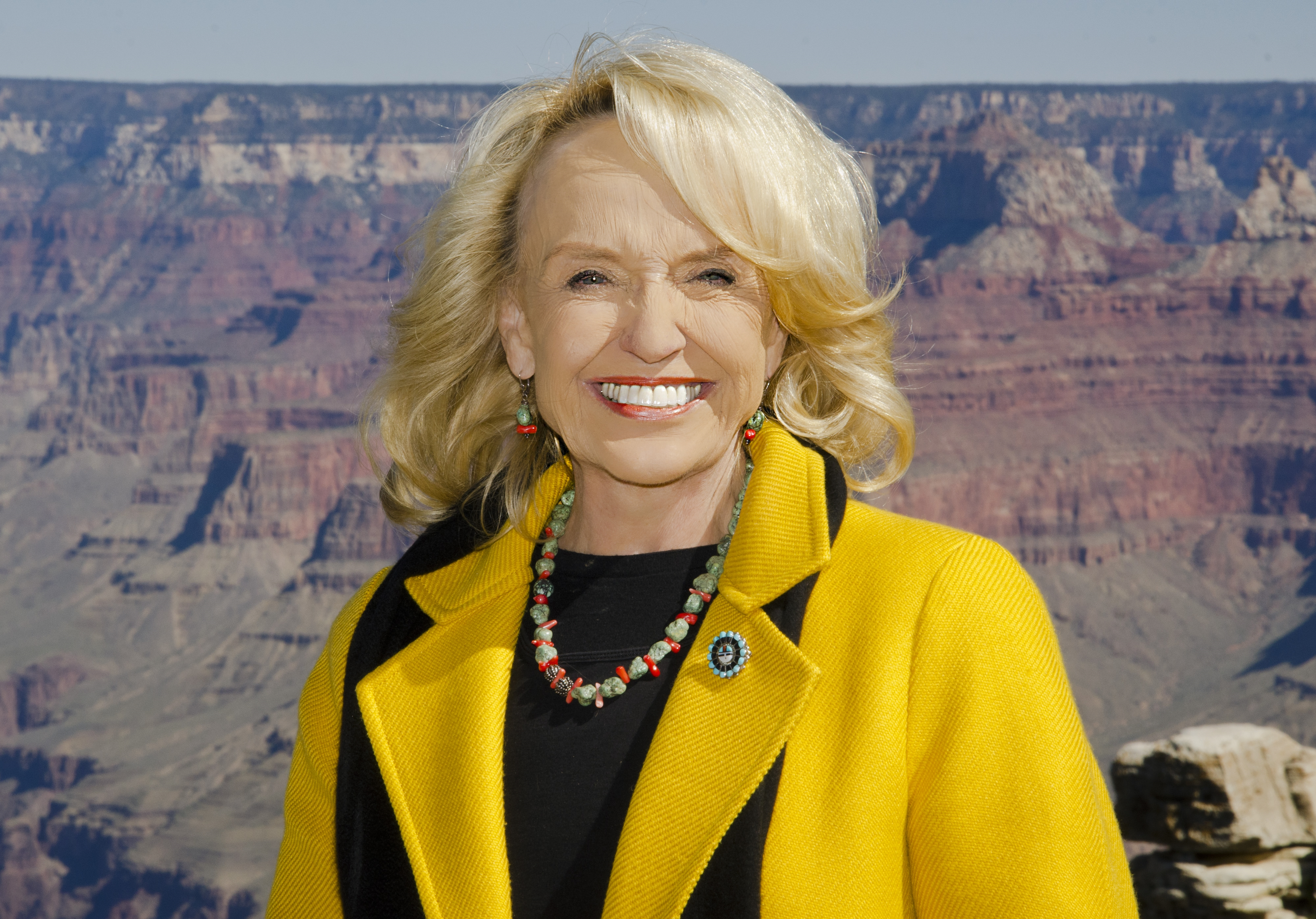
Brewer at the reopening of Grand Canyon National Park in 2013

Brewer said in 2012 that she did not believe the scientific consensus that global warming is man-made. She supported nature conservation and provided funding for this while she was on the Maricopa County Board of Supervisors. Brewer reduced environmental regulations as governor. She created an Environmental Audit Privilege that allowed companies to not disclose environmental violations, and she granted mining companies greater leeway in natural resource extraction. She abolished the State Parks Heritage Fund and opposed the creation of a Grand Canyon National Monument.

Brewer opposed the federal Endangered Species Act and supported an amendment to the Arizona Constitution that would guarantee the right to hunt, though she vetoed bills that threatened Mexican wolf populations. She opposed a Department of Homeland Security program that monitored the effect of a Mexico–United States border wall on jaguar populations.

Brewer issued an executive order on the environment on February 2, 2010, to establish Arizona's Policy on Climate Change. This set policy to reduce greenhouse gas emissions while also removing Arizona from the Western Climate Initiative. She argued that the Western Climate Initiative's cap-and-trade system would prevent economic recovery in Arizona. During the opening of a solar power plant in Phoenix, Brewer expressed support for a larger solar power industry in Arizona.

=== Gay rights ===
Brewer objected to a federal court decision the same year that ruled Arizona's ban on same-sex marriage unconstitutional, which she considered an encroachment of judicial authority. Brewer supported Arizona Proposition 107 as secretary of state in 2006, which would have defined marriage as between a man and a woman. She approved a budget that cut spousal benefits for domestic partners of government employees in 2009, reversing a policy implemented by Napolitano the previous year. In 2014, Brewer vetoed SB 1062 which would have made it legal for businesses to refuse service to gay customers. She explained this by saying non-discrimination exists as a right alongside religious freedom, warning that its passage risked social division and "unintended consequences".

=== Government and legal ===
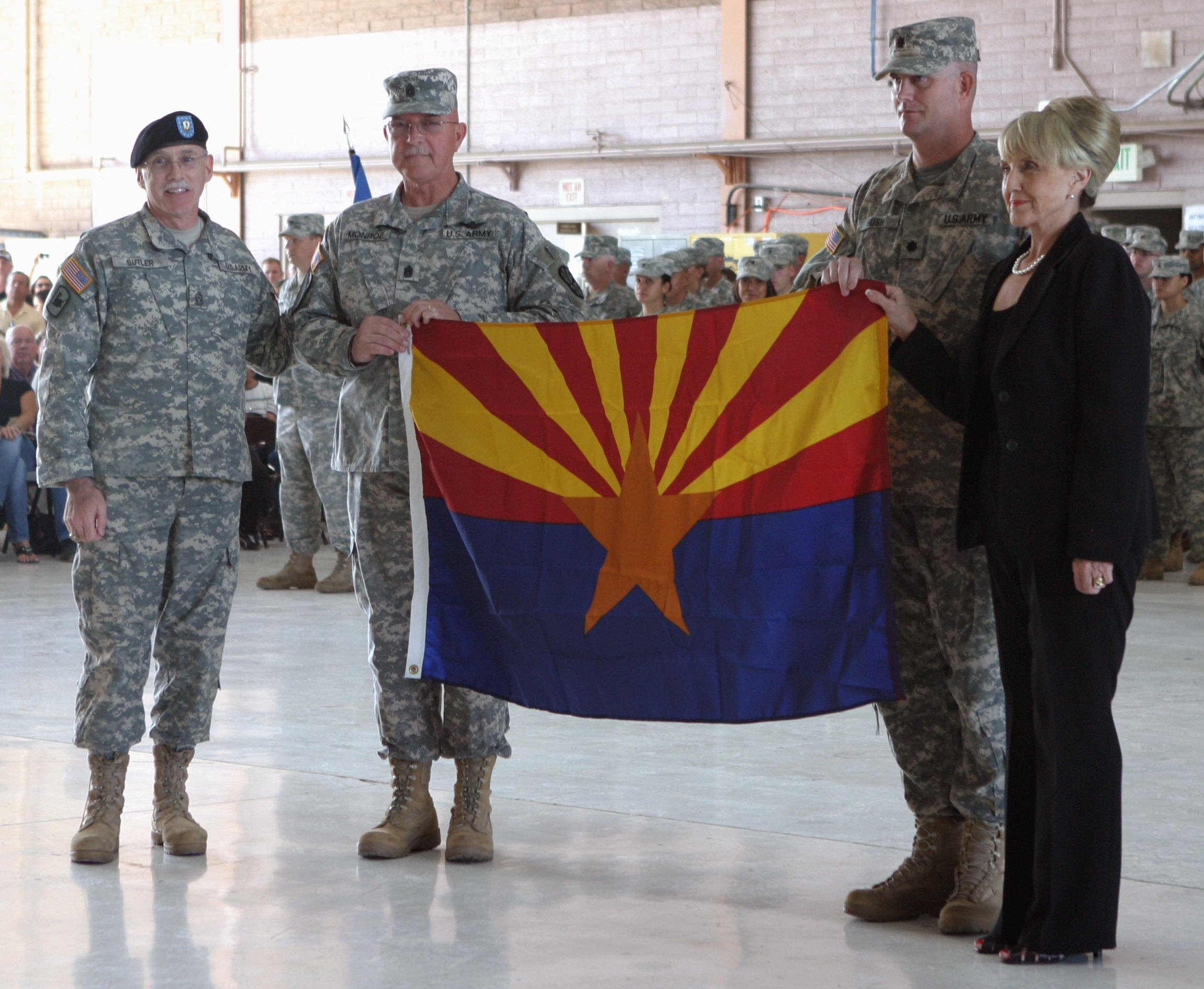
Brewer presenting the state flag in Phoenix to deploying units in 2009

Brewer opposed federal involvement in state politics. As governor, Brewer pushed for keeping Arizona military bases open, and vetoed a resolution in 2012, which declared that Arizona would fight any invading United Nations forces. After Arizona's Child Protective Services was found to have shelved 6,500 abuse tips without investigation, Brewer abolished it and replaced it with a cabinet-level Division of Child Safety that answered to the governor directly in 2014. Brewer also created a Task Force on Human Trafficking in April 2013 and implemented its recommendations by creating the Arizona Human Trafficking Council in March 2014. She frequently rejected recommendations for clemency, and she often did not provide a reason for commutations she granted. Her commutations were for typically for individuals who were near death or sentences that were "clearly excessive". Brewer vetoed a bill that would have expanded the death penalty out of concern that it would result in constitutional restrictions on capital punishment.

Brewer campaigned on voting reform when she ran to be secretary of state for Arizona, and she implemented several changes while in office. She launched a program for members of the United States Armed Forces deployed in other countries to vote through the internet or by fax machine. She had touch-screen voting made available for disabled voters, and to comply with federal law, she ended the use of punch-card ballots. Brewer vetoed a bill on April 18, 2011, that would have required anyone running for president to have proof of U.S. citizenship.

During Brewer's time as governor, she filled a number of vacancies in the courts. She appointed three State Supreme Court judges, Republicans Ann Timmer, John Pelander, and Robert M. Brutinel. She also appointed a number of Superior and Appellate Court judges. Her opponents criticized her for promoting judges primarily from the Republican Party. She reformed state employment in 2012 so that any new government employees after September 28 were under at-will employment. The bill also granted a temporary bonus for employees who switched to at-will employment. She argued that this would allow employees to be measured by merit instead of seniority and that it would make it easier to fire poorly-performing employees.

Brewer announced the closure of the Arizona Department of Juvenile Corrections in January 2010 so its $67 million budget could be saved. Juvenile inmates would instead be sent to facilities operated by the counties. She argued that this would allow the inmates to be closer to their homes. The decision was opposed by most county governments and sheriffs, and it was unpopular among the general public. Following backlash, she rescheduled the closure date from July 2010 to July 2011 and appointed a committee to create a plan for disbanding the department, providing it to her in November 2010. She canceled her plan to close the department in December 2010 without providing a reason for her change of position.

=== Gun laws ===
Brewer supported gun rights as governor, and was endorsed by the National Rifle Association in 2010. She signed the Firearms Freedom Act that exempted firearms and ammunition sold in Arizona from federal regulations if they were produced within the state, and she banned the destruction of guns that were legally seized or collected through gun buyback programs. She also signed a bill that banned the use of zoning ordinances to limit the use of firearms on private property.

Brewer expanded the right of concealed carry, abolishing the requirement for a permit, legalizing concealed carry in places that serve alcohol unless they display a no weapons sign, and reducing the minimum age of concealed carry from 21 to 19 for military personnel. She also signed a law that banned police from carrying firearms while consuming alcohol. Brewer signed a bill declaring the Colt revolver Arizona's official state firearm, which was criticized for its passage shortly after the 2011 Tucson shooting and by Native American groups whose tribes were historically in conflict with people armed with the revolver.

Despite her pro-gun stance, Brewer vetoed several laws supported by gun rights advocates. She vetoed bills legalizing the possession of a firearm in public buildings and one that would have allowed guns on college campuses—she justified the latter veto by saying that the bill was "poorly written". She also vetoed a bill that would have increased penalties on jurisdictions imposing gun laws that contradict state gun laws and one that would recognize an attempt to take another person's firearm as felony aggravated assault.

=== Health ===
Brewer was an opponent of the ACA and had Arizona join a coalition of 26 other states in a court challenge against the law. Though Brewer opposed the ACA, she deviated from her party by adopting the act's Medicaid expansion. She believed that taking the funding to support Arizona's poor was more pragmatic than rejecting it and letting the federal government allocate it elsewhere. She did not create the health care exchange authorized by the ACA, which she saw as too ambiguous. Brewer oversaw an enrollment freeze for the KidsCare healthcare program amid a lack of funding, and she supported a proposition to end the children's health program First Things First.

While she was in the state legislature, Brewer took on mental health as one of her main policy interests, spurred by her son's hospitalization for mental health reasons. Here she sponsored the first living will law in the United States. When she became secretary of state, she negotiated a public–private partnership that allowed advanced medical directives to be filed over the internet. As governor, Brewer cut funding for organ transplants in 2010 after the legislature determined that limited survival rates did not justify the cost. After criticism, the funding was restored.

Brewer opposes abortion except for cases of rape and incest. Shortly after becoming governor, Brewer implemented a 24-hour waiting period for women seeking abortion. She signed an abortion bill that banned abortions on the basis of a fetus's race or sex in March 2011. The following year, she signed a ban on abortions after 20 weeks and an exemption to religious organizations to provide contraception in the healthcare coverage. Other abortion laws implemented by Brewer include a law forbidding minors from having an abortion unless they have written and notarized permission from their parents or guardians, a ban on state funding for abortion providers, and authorization of warrantless inspections of abortion clinics. She signed a ban on abortions after 20 weeks of pregnancy in April 2012, but it was struck down by the Court of Appeals for the Ninth Circuit.

=== Immigration ===
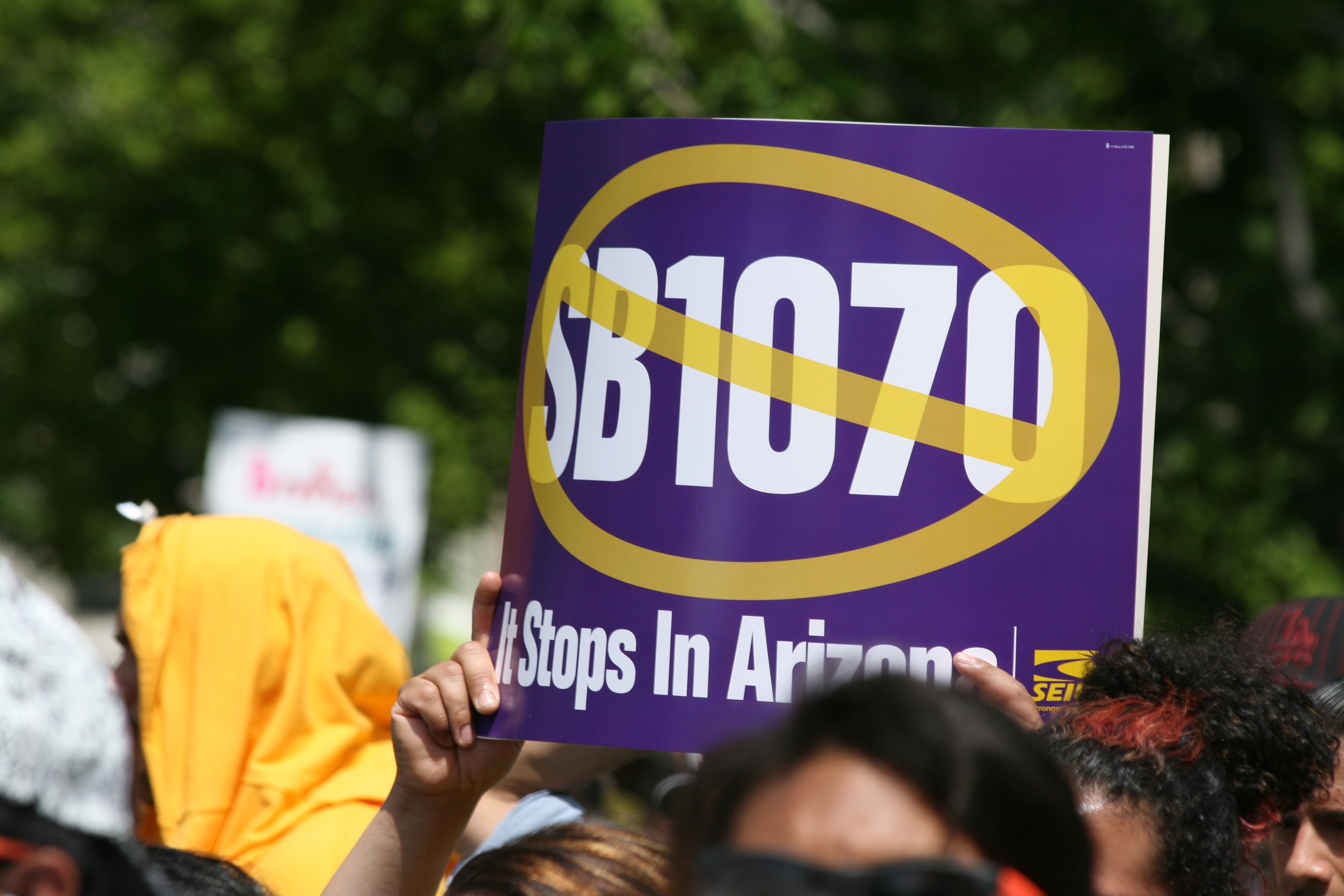
Brewer's support for SB 1070 galvanized both support and opposition on immigration policy.

Immigration became the issue most closely associated with Brewer during her time as governor. She became a leading figure in immigration discourse, and her strong positions against illegal immigration made her incredibly popular within the Republican Party. Brewer criticized the Obama administration's immigration policy as "backdoor amnesty", and she said that Arizona's immigration policy existed to correct the federal government's policy because it "refused to fix" what she described as a crisis. She opposed Obama's Deferred Action for Childhood Arrivals (DACA) policy that granted rights to non-citizens who arrived in the United States as children, and she issued an executive order saying that DACA recipients could not be issued drivers licenses in Arizona. Brewer supported the use of National Guard deployments to protect the Mexico–United States border, and she expressed support for the Border Security, Economic Opportunity, and Immigration Modernization Act of 2013 because it authorized $30 billion for border patrol, though she refused to endorse it because of its provision for a path to citizenship.

Brewer signed Arizona SB 1070 into law in 2010, causing national controversy. The bill made it a crime for non-citizens to be in Arizona without carrying paperwork that proves legal immigration or residency status. It also allowed law enforcement to ask about immigration status and required them to arrest anyone found to be in the United States illegally. Other provisions included restrictions on hiring undocumented immigrants and legalization of lawsuits against government agencies that prevent enforcement of immigration law. Brewer justified the policy by saying there were drug traffickers among undocumented immigrants. Civil rights groups opposed the bill out of fear that it would encourage racial profiling of Hispanic citizens. In response, Brewer created a program to train law enforcement when to ask about immigration status. While SB 1070 received national attention, Brewer signed several more immigration bills into law. These included bills that removed state recognition of consular cards as valid identification, retroactively applied a ban on undocumented immigrants claiming punitive damages in civil trials, made forgery a felony if it was done to establish a smuggling drop house, required that the state release children if the federal government issued a detainer, and required proof of legal status to obtain state identification. Before she was governor, Brewer was responsible for implementing Arizona Proposition 200 as secretary of state in 2004, which required citizens in the state to show proof of citizenship before registering to vote or applying for public benefits. Critics of the proposition argued that it was anti-immigrant and discriminated against Latino citizens.

== See also ==
- List of female secretaries of state in the United States

Political offices
Preceded by Betsey Bayless	Secretary of State of Arizona; 2003–2009	Succeeded by Ken Bennett
Preceded by Janet Napolitano	Governor of Arizona; 2009–2015	Succeeded by Doug Ducey
Party political offices
Preceded by Len Munsil	Republican nominee for Governor of Arizona; 2010	Succeeded by Doug Ducey
U.S. order of precedence (ceremonial)
Preceded by Fife Symington as Former Governor	Order of precedence of the United States	Succeeded by Doug Ducey as Former Governor
