= Donald L. Owens =

Arizona Air National Guard general (1930–2012)

- Born: April 13, 1930
- Died: May 2, 2012 (aged 82)
- Military career
- Allegiance: United States
- Rank: Major General
- Commands: Arizona Air National Guard

Maj. Gen. Donald L. Owens (April 13, 1930 – May 2, 2012) served as Arizona's Adjutant General and Director of the Arizona Department of Emergency and Military Affairs.

Maj. Gen. Owens joined the Arizona Air National Guard as a private in 1952. During his career, he served as Commanding General of the Arizona Air National Guard and Commander of the 161st Air Refueling Wing, among other positions. He was named Adjutant General in 1983, and faithfully served in this role until his retirement in 1994. Maj. Gen. Owens was inducted into the Arizona Aviation Hall of Fame in 2010.

Arizona Governor Jan Brewer ordered flags be lowered to half-staff on the date of his interment, May 10, 2012.
