= Cal Holman =

American politician

Calvin Morns Holman
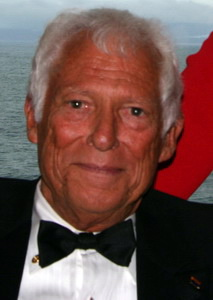

Member of the Arizona House of Representatives from the 24th district
- In office 1975–1985

Personal details
- Born: March 30, 1931 Topeka, Kansas, US
- Died: December 28, 2007 (aged 76) Scottsdale, Arizona, US
- Party: Republican
- Spouse: Elizabeth Jordan Holman
- Children: 2
- Education: Stanford and Harvard
- Profession: Banking
- Website: Friends of Cal

Calvin Holman served in the Arizona House of Representatives from 1975 to 1985. A Republican, Holman represented District 24 in the Paradise Valley, Arizona area.

== Early life and education ==
Holman was born in Topeka, Kansas, on March 30, 1931. Holman earned an undergraduate degree in American history from Harvard University in 1952. He then served in the United States Army Corps of Engineers. After being seriously injured while in the service, Holman earned an MBA from Stanford University in 1956. After college he began his career at the Northern Trust Company in Chicago.

== Career ==
Holman served for 10 years in the Arizona House of Representatives. During his tenure, he served as Chairman of the Banking and Insurance Committee and Chairman of the Administration Committee. He also maintained involvement with other committees, such as the Health and Aging Committee, Public Institutions Committee, Counties and Municipalities Committee, Joint Legislative Oversight Committee and permanent subcommittee on Insurance, Appropriations Committee, Transportation Committee, and the Joint Legislative Reapportionment and Redistricting Committee. He was also a member of the Legislative Council.

After leaving the Arizona House of Representatives, Holman served as the director of the Arizona Insurance Council for 10 years. He then served on the Arizona Council for the Hearing Impaired where he was chairman from 1998 to 2001.

After serving the Arizona Legislature, Holman served as a chairman of the District 24 and District 17 Republican Party and as president of the Scottsdale Republican Forum.

In January 2008, the Arizona Republican Party gave Holman a medal posthumously - For Untiring Work and Dedication in Legislative District 8. At the same time the Arizona Republican Party's annual award for volunteerism was named in honor of Holman.

== Personal ==
He was married to his wife, Elizabeth for 51 years and had two children, Calvin (Mark) on March 17, 1957, and Mary on September 30, 1958. Holman moved to Phoenix in 1961 to work at the Valley National Bank.

Holman was active in the community as president of the Homeowners Association and a member of Scottsdale Sunrise Rotary, where he was a Paul Harris Fellow. Holman had a perfect attendance record at Rotary International. His father was active in Rotary International as is his daughter, Mary, and daughter in law, Virginia Ann. In his honor Scottsdale Sunrise Rotary has established a scholarship for aspiring political leaders at Scottsdale Community College.

Holman was personally popular and media reports after his death quoted many friends praising his integrity and public service.

Holman was killed in an automobile accident on December 28, 2007. Two men were allegedly street racing and crashed into Holman's 1973 Camaro. They were subsequently arrested and charged with second degree murder.
