= 2025 Arizona's 7th congressional district special election =

Election following the death of Raúl Grijalva

- September 23, 2025

Arizona's 7th congressional district
- Turnout: 23.18%
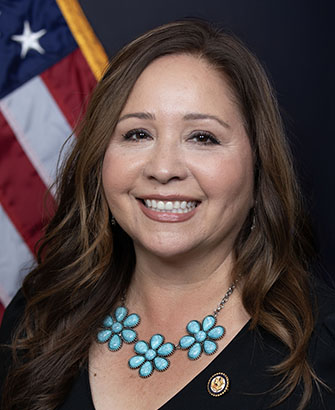

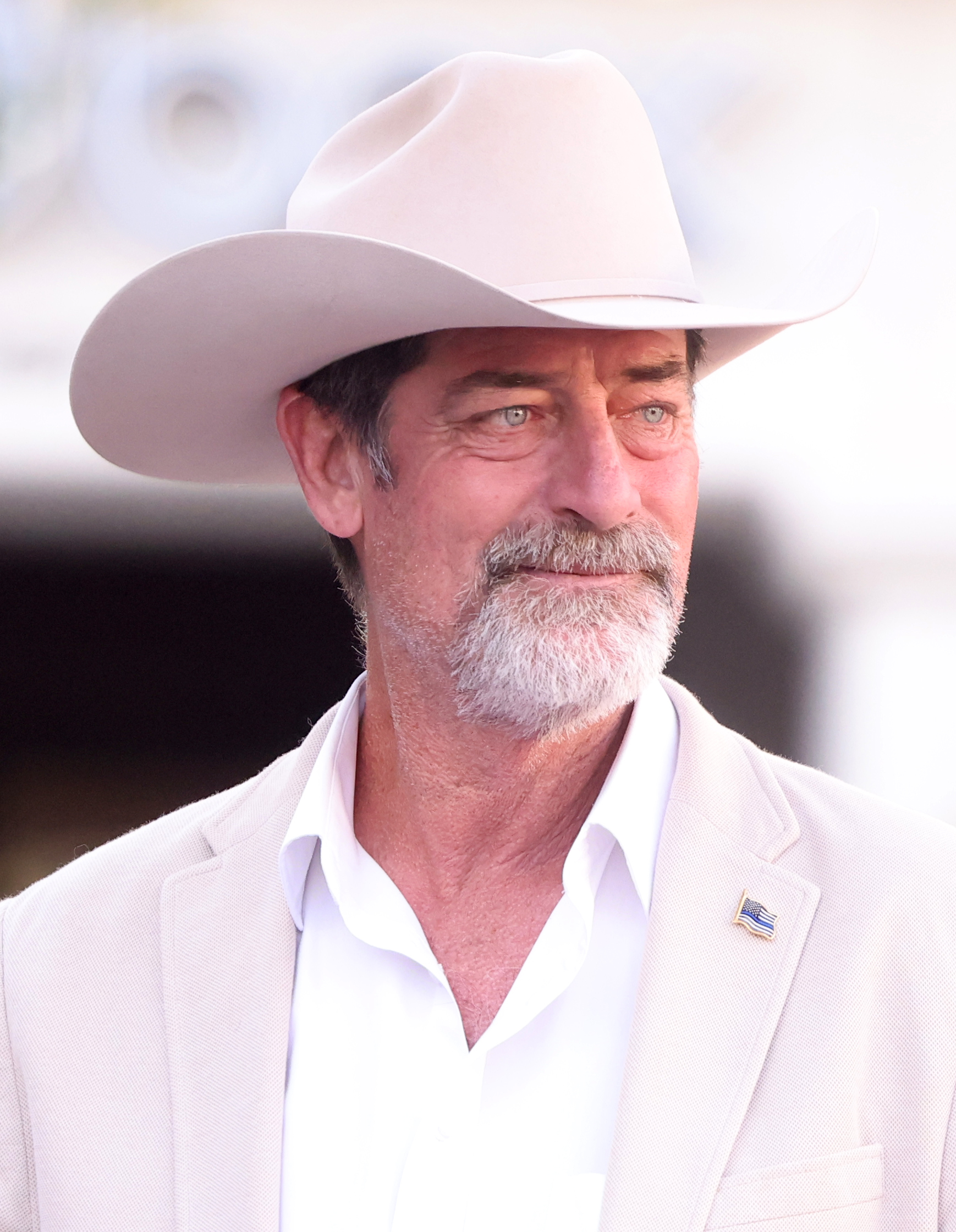
| Nominee | Adelita Grijalva | Daniel Butierez |
| Party | Democratic | Republican |
| Popular vote | 70,148 | 29,944 |
| Percentage | 68.92% | 29.42% |
- Grijalva: 40–50% 50–60% 60–70% 70–80% 80–90% >90% Butierez: 40–50% 50–60% 60–70% 70–80% 80–90% >90% Tie: 50%
U.S. Representative before election
Raúl Grijalva
Democratic
Elected U.S. Representative
Adelita Grijalva
Democratic

The 2025 Arizona's 7th congressional district special election was held on September 23, 2025, to fill Arizona's 7th congressional district for the remainder of the 119th United States Congress. The result was certified by the Arizona Secretary of State, Adrian Fontes, on October 14.

This followed the July 15, 2025, primary election, the results of which were certified by Fontes 16 days later on July 31.

The seat became vacant following the death of incumbent Democrat Raúl Grijalva on March 13, 2025.

The election was won by former Pima County supervisor Adelita Grijalva, Raúl Grijalva's daughter. The younger Grijalva won by 40%, a significant overperformance from Kamala Harris's 22% victory in the district in the 2024 presidential election.

== Background ==
Incumbent Congressman Raúl Grijalva was diagnosed with lung cancer on April 2, 2024, and died in office on March 13, 2025, from complications from cancer treatments, at age 77. Arizona Governor Katie Hobbs announced a special election to fill the vacancy would be held on September 23, 2025, with the primary set for July 15. Due to the districts partisan lean, it is considered a safe Democratic. Kamala Harris won the district by 22% in 2024, and the Democratic candidate was easily expected to win.

== Democratic primary ==
=== Candidates ===
- Adelita Grijalva, former Pima County supervisor (2020–2025) and daughter of deceased incumbent Raúl Grijalva
- Deja Foxx, organizer and social media influencer
- Patrick Harris, businessman
- Daniel Hernández Jr., former state representative from the 2nd district (2017–2023) and candidate for the 6th congressional district in 2022
- Jose Malvido Jr., nonprofit program officer

==== Declined ====
- Adrian Fontes, Arizona secretary of state (2023–present) (running for re-election)
- Alma Hernandez, state representative from the 20th district (2023–present) (endorsed Hernández)
- Consuelo Hernandez, state representative from the 21st district (2023–present) (endorsed Hernández)
- Regina Romero, mayor of Tucson (2019–present) (endorsed Grijalva)

=== Endorsements ===
Deja Foxx

U.S. representatives

- Marilyn Strickland, U.S. representative from Washington's 10th congressional district (2021–present)

Party officials

- David Hogg, former vice chair of the Democratic National Committee (2025)

Individuals

- Busy Philipps, actress

Organizations

- ASPIRE PAC
- Leaders We Deserve
- LPAC
Adelita Grijalva

U.S. senators

- Ruben Gallego, U.S. senator from Arizona (2025–present)
- Mark Kelly, U.S. senator from Arizona (2020–present)
- Bernie Sanders, U.S. senator from Vermont (2007–present) (Independent)

U.S. representatives

- Ron Barber, former U.S. representative from Arizona's 8th congressional district (2012–2015)
- Greg Casar, U.S. representative from Texas's 35th congressional district (2023–present)
- Veronica Escobar, U.S. representative from Texas's 16th congressional district (2019–present)
- Maxwell Frost, U.S. representative from Florida's 10th congressional district (2023–present)
- Gabby Giffords, former U.S. representative from Arizona's 8th congressional district (2007–2012)
- Pramila Jayapal, U.S. representative from Washington's 7th congressional district (2017–present)
- Ann Kirkpatrick, former U.S. representative from Arizona's 2nd congressional district (2009–2011, 2013–2017, 2019–2023)
- Alexandria Ocasio-Cortez, U.S. representative from New York's 14th congressional district (2019–present)
- Linda Sánchez, U.S. representative from California's 38th congressional district (2003–present)
- Nydia Velázquez, U.S. representative from New York's 7th congressional district (1993–present)

State legislators

- Cesar Aguilar, state representative from the 26th district (2023–present)
- Rosanna Gabaldón, state senator from the 21st district (2021–present)
- Nancy Gutierrez, state representative from the 18th district (2023–present)
- Christopher Mathis, state representative from the 18th district (2021–present)
- Mariana Sandoval, state representative from the 23rd district (2023–present)
- Stephanie Stahl Hamilton, state representative from the 21st district (2023–present)
- Priya Sundareshan, state senator from the 26th district (2023–present)
- Betty Villegas, state representative from the 20th district (2023–present)

Local officials

- Andrés Cano, Pima County supervisor (2025–present) and former state representative from the 20th district (2019–2023)
- Gabriella Cázares-Kelly, Pima County recorder (2021–present)
- Kate Gallego, mayor of Phoenix (2019–present)
- Regina Romero, mayor of Tucson (2019–present)

Labor unions

- Communications Workers of America Local 7000
- International Association of Machinists and Aerospace Workers
- International Brotherhood of Electrical Workers Local 570
- National Nurses United
- United Food and Commercial Workers Local 99

Organizations

- Center for Biological Diversity Action Fund
- Christopher Street Project
- Congressional Hispanic Caucus BOLD PAC
- Congressional Progressive Caucus PAC
- EMILY's List
- Giffords PAC
- Humane World Action Fund
- Latino Victory Fund
- League of Conservation Voters Action Fund PAC
- National Committee to Preserve Social Security and Medicare
- Our Revolution
- PODER PAC
- Reproductive Freedom for All
- Working Families Party

Tribal nations

- Tohono O'odham Nation
Daniel Hernández Jr.

Executive branch officials

- Marco López Jr., former chief of staff of U.S. Customs and Border Protection (2009–2011)

U.S. representatives

- Eric Sorensen, U.S. representative from Illinois's 17th congressional district (2023–present)
- Norma Torres, U.S. representative from California's 35th congressional district (2015–present)
- Ritchie Torres, U.S. representative from New York's 15th congressional district (2021–present)

State legislators

- Lupe Contreras, state representative from the 22nd district (2023–present)
- Eva Diaz, state senator from the 22nd district (2023–present)
- Sally Ann Gonzales, state senator from the 20th district (2019–present)
- Alma Hernandez, state representative from the 20th district (2023–present) (candidate's sister)
- Consuelo Hernandez, state representative from the 21st district (2023–present) (candidate's sister)
- Lydia Hernandez, state representative from the 24th district (2023–present)
- Evan Low, former California state assemblymember from the 26th district (2014–2024)
- Elda Luna-Nájera, state representative from the 22nd district (2024–present)
- Myron Tsosie, state representative from the 6th district (2019–present)

Individuals

- Shannon Watts, founder of Moms Demand Action

Labor unions

- Arizona Federation of Teachers
- International Association of Sheet Metal, Air, Rail and Transportation Workers Local 807
- International Brotherhood of Teamsters Local 104

Organizations

- Center for Freethought Equality
- Democratic Majority for Israel PAC
- Equality Arizona
- Equality PAC
- Freedom From Religion Foundation
- LGBTQ+ Victory Fund
- Stonewall Democrats of Arizona
Declined to endorse

Organizations

- AIPAC

=== Polling ===
| Poll source | Date(s) administered | Sample size (Note: Key: A – all adults RV – registered voters LV – likely voters V – unclear) | Margin of error | Deja Foxx | Adelita Grijalva | Daniel Hernández | Other | Undecided |
|---|---|---|---|---|---|---|---|---|
| Change Research (D) (Note: Poll sponsored by Foxx's campaign) | June 26–29, 2025 | 540 (LV) | ± 4.5% | 35% | 43% | 9% | 3% (Note: Malvido with 3%; Harris with 0%) | 11% |
| Change Research (D) | May 13–16, 2025 | 530 (LV) | ± 4.4% | 10% | 41% | 16% | 2% (Note: Harris and Malvido with 1%) | 32% |
| Public Policy Polling (D) (Note: Poll sponsored by Grijalva's campaign) | April 7–8, 2025 | 527 (LV) | ± 4.3% | 5% | 49% | 11% | – | 35% |

=== Debates ===
2025 Arizona's 7th congressional district special election Democratic primary debate
| No. | Date | Host | Moderator | Link | Democratic | Democratic | Democratic | Democratic | Democratic |
| Key: P Participant A Absent N Not invited I Invited W Withdrawn | | | | | | | | | |
| Key: P Participant A Absent N Not invited I Invited W Withdrawn | | | | | Foxx | Grijalva | Harris | Hernández | Malvido |
|---|---|---|---|---|---|---|---|---|---|
| 1 | May 27, 2025 | KAET | Ted Simons | | P | P | P | P | P |
| 2 | June 10, 2025 | Arizona Public Media | Steve Goldstein, Nohelani Graf | | P | P | P | P | P |

=== Campaign and results ===
Results by county Grijalva 50–60% 60–70%

Writing for The Arizona Republic in May, Laura Gersony believed that the leading candidates were former state Representative Daniel Hernández Jr., Grijalva's daughter Adelita Grijalva, and social media influencer Deja Foxx. Gersony noted that while Hernández held an initial lead in fundraising, which she attributed to his support for Israel, but that Grijalva would likely benefit from the campaign infrastructure built by her father. Grijalva received the endorsement of both of Arizona's U.S. Senators, Mark Kelly and Ruben Gallego, and a number of Democratic political organizations, including EMILYs List and Giffords.

Democratic primary results
| Party | Candidate | Votes | % |
|---|---|---|---|
| Democratic | Adelita Grijalva | 38,679 | 61.48% |
| Democratic | Deja Foxx | 14,078 | 22.38% |
| Democratic | Daniel Hernández Jr. | 8,541 | 13.58% |
| Democratic | Patrick Harris | 925 | 1.47% |
| Democratic | Jose Malvido Jr. | 687 | 1.09% |
| Total votes | | 62,910 | 100.00% |

Results by county
| County | Foxx | % | Grijalva | % | Harris | % | Hernández Jr. | % | Malvido Jr. | % | Total |
|---|---|---|---|---|---|---|---|---|---|---|---|
| Cochise | 646 | 22.17% | 1,888 | 64.79% | 35 | 1.20% | 326 | 11.19% | 19 | 0.65% | 2,914 |
| Maricopa | 1,122 | 21.69% | 2,739 | 52.95% | 109 | 2.11% | 1,167 | 22.56% | 36 | 0.70% | 5,173 |
| Pima | 10,880 | 23.93% | 27,923 | 61.42% | 622 | 1.37% | 5,512 | 12.12% | 525 | 1.16% | 45,462 |
| Pinal | 31 | 14.90% | 120 | 57.69% | 7 | 3.37% | 45 | 21.64% | 5 | 2.40% | 208 |
| Santa Cruz | 696 | 15.08% | 3,087 | 66.88% | 68 | 1.47% | 717 | 15.53% | 48 | 1.04% | 4,616 |
| Yuma | 703 | 15.50% | 2,922 | 64.40% | 84 | 1.85% | 774 | 17.06% | 54 | 1.19% | 4,537 |

== Republican primary ==
=== Candidates ===
- Daniel Butierez, painting contractor and nominee for this district in 2024
- Jorge Rivas, restaurant owner
- Jimmy Rodriguez, businessman

=== Endorsements ===
Jorge Rivas

Local officials

- Ross Teeple, Pinal County sheriff (2025–present)

=== Debates ===
2025 Arizona's 7th congressional district special election Republican primary debate
| No. | Date | Host | Moderator | Link | Republican | Republican | Republican |
| Key: P Participant A Absent N Not invited I Invited W Withdrawn | | | | | | | |
| Key: P Participant A Absent N Not invited I Invited W Withdrawn | | | | | Butierez | Rivas | Rodriguez |
|---|---|---|---|---|---|---|---|
| 1 | May 30, 2025 | KAET | Ted Simons | | P | P | A |
| 2 | June 9, 2025 | Arizona Public Media | Steve Goldstein, Nohelani Graf | | P | P | P |

=== Results ===
Republican primary results
| Party | Candidate | Votes | % |
|---|---|---|---|
| Republican | Daniel Butierez | 11,121 | 60.89% |
| Republican | Jorge Rivas | 4,594 | 25.15% |
| Republican | Jimmy Rodriguez | 2,549 | 13.96% |
| Total votes | | 18,264 | 100.00% |

Results by county
| Town | Butierez | | Rivas | | Rodriguez | | Total |
|---|---|---|---|---|---|---|---|
| Cochise | 446 | 51.86% | 303 | 35.23% | 111 | 12.91% | 860 |
| Maricopa | 824 | 46.29% | 603 | 33.88% | 353 | 19.83% | 1,780 |
| Pima | 7,309 | 62.15% | 2,871 | 24.41% | 1,580 | 13.44% | 11,760 |
| Pinal | 170 | 60.71% | 78 | 27.86% | 32 | 11.43% | 280 |
| Santa Cruz | 936 | 68.22% | 282 | 20.55% | 154 | 11.22% | 1,372 |
| Yuma | 1,434 | 64.89% | 457 | 20.68% | 319 | 14.43% | 2,210 |

== Third parties and independents ==
=== Green primary ===
==== Candidates ====
===== Declared =====
- Eduardo Quintana, former chair of the Pima County Green Party and nominee for U.S. Senate in 2024 (write-in)
- Gary Swing, organic produce clerk and perennial candidate (write-in)

==== Results ====
Green primary results
| Party | Candidate | Votes | % |
|---|---|---|---|
| Green | Eduardo Quintana (write-in) | 42 | 95.45% |
| Green | Gary Swing (write-in) | 2 | 4.55% |
| Total votes | | 44 | 100.00% |

=== Libertarian primary ===
==== Candidates ====
===== Declared =====
- Andy Fernandez (write-in)

==== Results ====
Libertarian primary results
| Party | Candidate | Votes | % |
|---|---|---|---|
| Libertarian | Andy Fernandez (write-in) | 19 | 100.00% |
| Total votes | | 19 | 100.00% |

=== No Labels primary ===
==== Candidates ====
===== Declared =====
- Richard Grayson, writer and perennial candidate (write-in)

==== Results ====
No Labels primary results
| Party | Candidate | Votes | % |
|---|---|---|---|
| No Labels | Richard Grayson (write-in) | 1 | 100.00% |
| Total votes | | 1 | 100.00% |

=== Write-in candidates ===
==== Declared ====
- Jeff Beasley (Republican)
- Avery Block (Republican)
- G. Seville Hatch (Republican)
- Nathaniel Irwin Sr. (No Labels)
- Trista di Genova (Independent)
- Cheval Lavers (Democratic)
- David McAllister (Republican)
- James Rose (DSA)
- Daniel Wood (Independent)

== General election ==
=== Predictions ===
| Source | Ranking | As of |
|---|---|---|
| The Cook Political Report | Solid D | August 13, 2025 |
| Inside Elections | Solid D | June 30, 2025 |
| Sabato's Crystal Ball | Safe D | August 14, 2025 |

2025 Arizona's 7th congressional district special election debate
| No. | Date | Host | Moderator | Link | Republican | Democratic |
| Key: P Participant A Absent N Not invited I Invited W Withdrawn | | | | | | |
| Key: P Participant A Absent N Not invited I Invited W Withdrawn | | | | | Butierez | Grijalva |
|---|---|---|---|---|---|---|
| 1 | August 26, 2025 | Arizona Public Media | Nohelani Graf | | P | P |

=== Results ===

2025 Arizona's 7th congressional district special election
| Party | Candidate | Votes | % | ±% |
|---|---|---|---|---|
| Democratic | Adelita Grijalva | 70,148 | 68.92% | +5.47% |
| Republican | Daniel Butierez | 29,944 | 29.42% | −7.13% |
| Green | Eduardo Quintana | 1,118 | 1.10% | N/A |
| No Labels | Richard Grayson | 537 | 0.53% | N/A |
| Republican | Jeff Beasley (write-in) | 9 | 0.01% | N/A |
| Independent | James Rose (write-in) | 8 | 0.01% | N/A |
| Independent | Trista di Genova (write-in) | 3 | 0.00% | N/A |
| Republican | G. Sevillr Hatch (write-in) | 3 | 0.00% | N/A |
| Republican | Avery Block (write-in) | 2 | 0.00% | N/A |
| Independent | Daniel Wood (write-in) | 2 | 0.00% | N/A |
| No Labels | Nathaniel James Irwin Sr. (write-in) | 1 | 0.00% | N/A |
| Democratic | Cheval Lavers (write-in) | 1 | 0.00% | N/A |
| Total votes | | 101,776 | 100.00% | N/A |
| Democratic hold | | | | |

==== By county ====
| County | Adelita Grijalva Democratic | | Daniel Butierez Republican | | Various candidates Other parties | | Margin | | Total votes cast |
| County | # | % | # | % | # | % | # | % | Total votes cast |
|---|---|---|---|---|---|---|---|---|---|
| Cochise (part) | 3,327 | 71.06% | 1,277 | 27.27% | 78 | 1.67% | 2,050 | 43.78% | 4,682 |
| Maricopa (part) | 6,221 | 67.80% | 2,800 | 30.52% | 154 | 1.68% | 3,421 | 37.29% | 9,175 |
| Pima (part) | 49,992 | 70.26% | 19,982 | 28.08% | 1,180 | 1.66% | 30,010 | 42.18% | 71,154 |
| Pinal (part) | 275 | 36.67% | 460 | 61.33% | 15 | 2.00% | -185 | -24.67% | 750 |
| Santa Cruz | 4,912 | 69.70% | 2,047 | 29.05% | 88 | 1.25% | 2,865 | 40.66% | 7,047 |
| Yuma (part) | 5,421 | 60.45% | 3,378 | 37.67% | 169 | 1.88% | 2,043 | 22.78% | 8,968 |
| Totals | 70,148 | 68.92% | 29,944 | 29.42% | 1,684 | 1.65% | 40,204 | 39.50% | 101,776 |

== Notes ==
Partisan clients
