= Deja Foxx =

American human rights activist (born 2000)

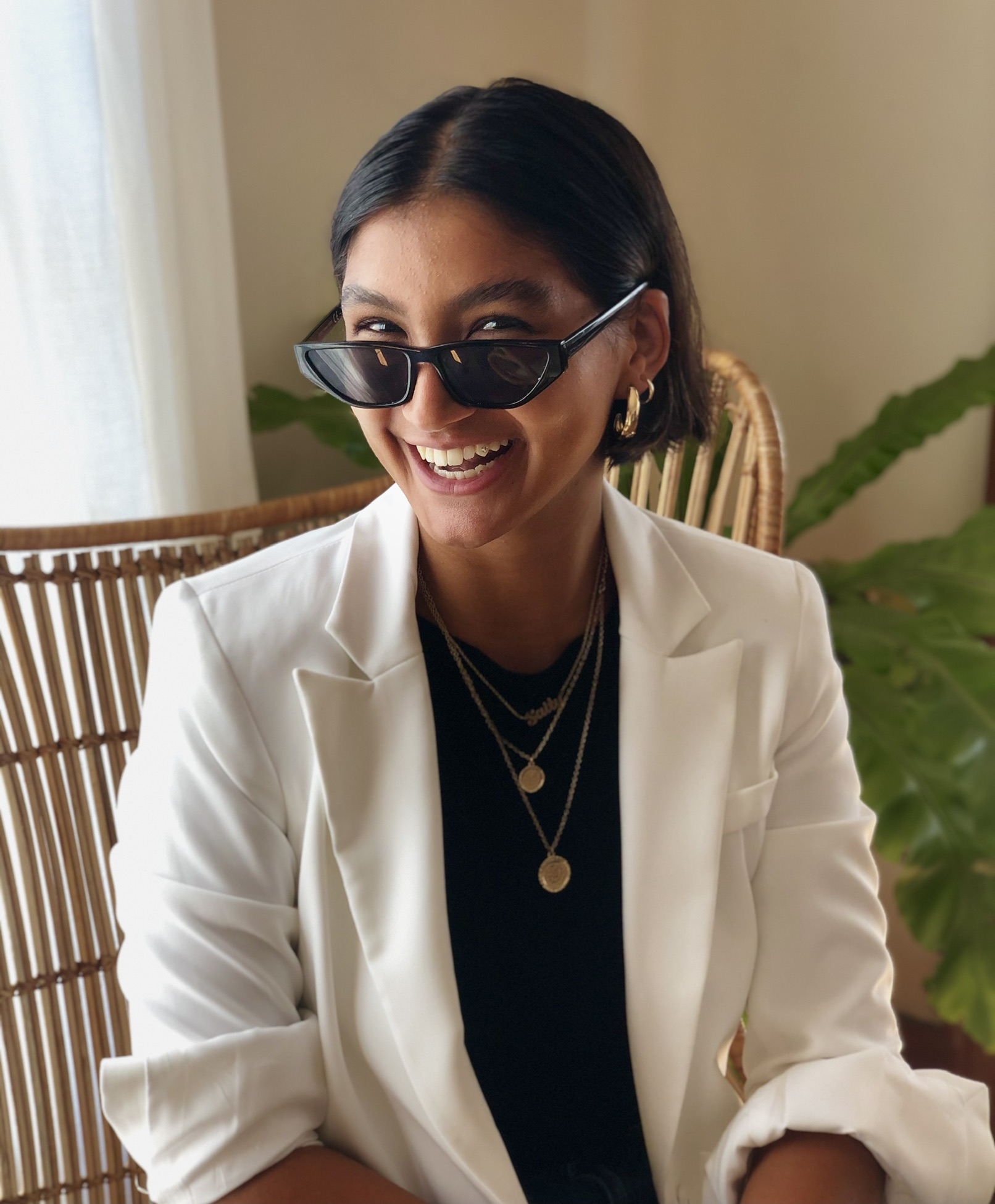
- Foxx in 2020
- Born: Deja Cherise Operana-Foxx; April 18, 2000 (age 26); Tucson, Arizona, U.S.
- Education: Columbia University (BA)
- Political party: Democratic
- Website: Official website

Deja Cherise Operana-Foxx (/ˈdeɪʒə/ DAY-zhə; born April 18, 2000) is an American political organizer and former model who was a candidate in the Democratic Party's primary election for Arizona's 7th congressional district in the 2025 special election, losing to Adelita Grijalva. She previously campaigned for Kamala Harris in her 2020 and 2024 presidential campaigns, having first come to national prominence as a supporter of Planned Parenthood.

== Early life and education ==
Foxx, a Filipina American, was born and raised in Tucson, Arizona, where she attended a magnet school, University High School. She was raised in Section 8 housing and her family relied on food stamps growing up. When she was 15, she stopped living with her mother, who struggled with mental illness and substance abuse, and stayed with friends. Foxx worked at a gas station for two years to help support her mother.

While at school, she successfully campaigned to change the sex education curriculum to increase its relevance. In her senior year, she became a founding member of El Rio Community Health Center's Reproductive Health Access Project, which provides reproductive health care to young people in the Tucson area. She won a Community Innovation Award from the Society for Science in 2018 for a study on the frequencies and relationships of age, race, insurer and BMI to rate of C-sections.

In 2018, Foxx began studying political science at Columbia University in New York City, where she had a full scholarship. Foxx made the dean's list for her academic performance. She later became a race and ethnicity major and graduated in 2023, the first in her family to attend and graduate from college.

== Political career ==
Foxx first came to national prominence in April 2017 when she challenged Senator Jeff Flake at a town hall meeting in Mesa, Arizona, over his plans to defund Planned Parenthood. In June 2017, when Foxx travelled to Washington, D.C., to campaign for the organization, The Washington Post called her "the new face of Planned Parenthood".

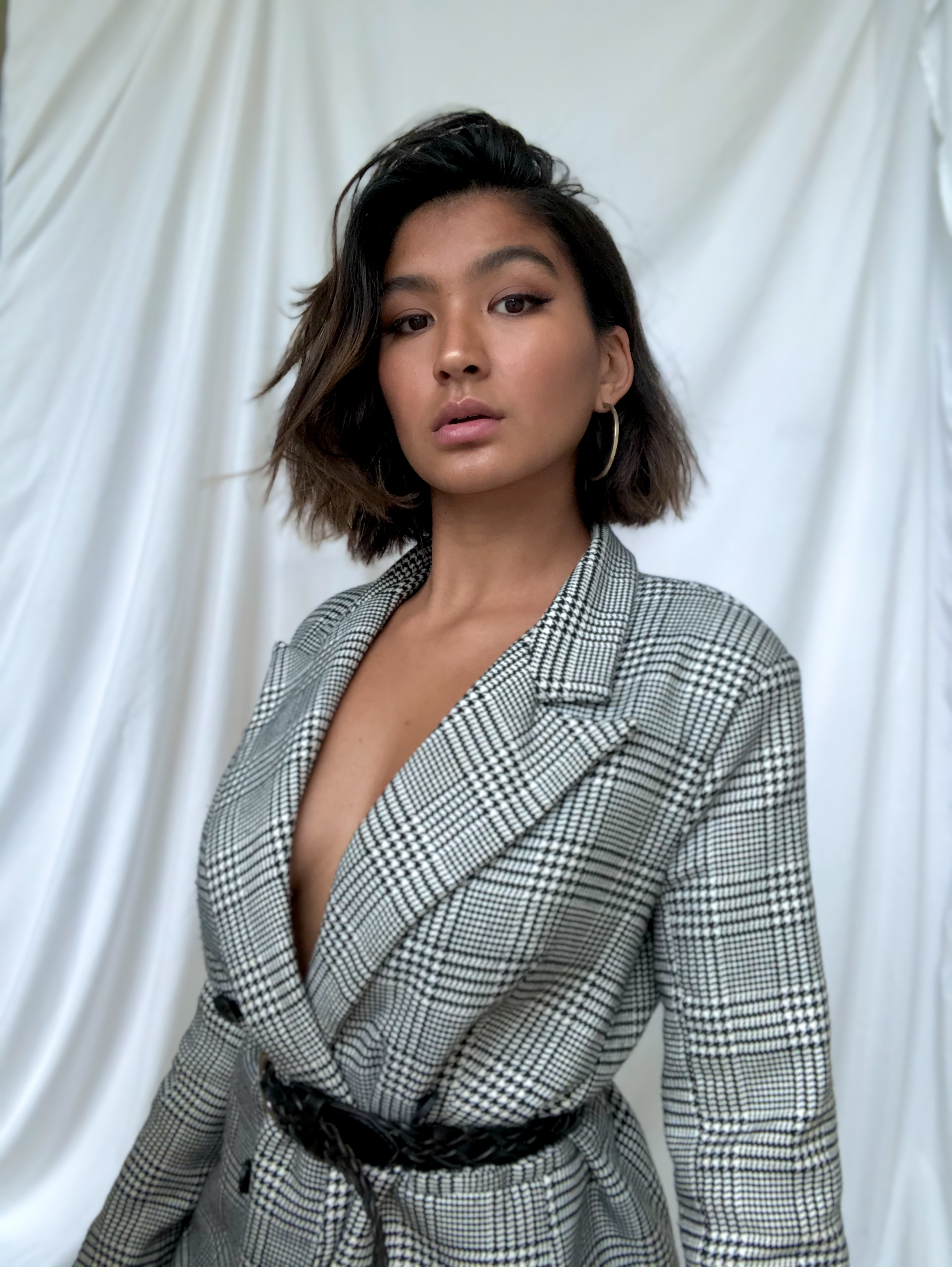
Foxx in 2020

Foxx founded GenZ Girl Gang, "an Instagram community determined to redefine sisterhood for a new generation", in April 2019. She later explained that one purpose of the organization was to "translate this idea of solidarity... into a digital space, because more and more that's where we're spending our time". In 2024, she won an award from the Muhammad Ali Center for founding GenZ Girl Gang.

In 2019, Foxx was invited to join the presidential campaign of Kamala Harris as a full-time staff member by Harris' niece, Meena Harris. Foxx took her sophomore year off college and moved to Baltimore, Maryland. She focused on digital organizing and messaging and described her own role as "influencer and surrogate strategist". After Harris withdrew from the election, Foxx created a digital campaign for Ignite the Vote, a get out the vote organization whose national bus tour was cancelled as a result of the COVID-19 pandemic.

On June 30, 2022, Foxx was arrested during a protest in Washington, D.C., against the reversal of Roe v. Wade by the Supreme Court six days earlier in the decision Dobbs v. Jackson Women's Health Organization. The protest was organized by the Center for Popular Democracy, Planned Parenthood Action Fund, and the Working Families Party. Foxx was arrested alongside 180 others. She featured in TikTok, Boom., a documentary that premiered in October 2022 about the social media platform TikTok. In 2023, she won a Global Citizen Prize for her "reproductive and sexual health advocacy".

Foxx spoke at the 2024 Democratic National Convention, where she was one of 200 content creators in attendance. In her speech, she focused on reproductive rights and student debt and proclaimed "we need Kamala Harris". On the second night of the convention, she hosted a party called "Hotties for Harris", attended by David Hogg and Maxwell Frost. In 2024, she also campaigned in support of Arizona Proposition 139, an amendment establishing a right to abortion in the Constitution of Arizona.

=== 2025 special election ===
On April 2, 2025, Foxx announced her candidacy for the special election in Arizona's 7th congressional district, vacant following the death of incumbent Raúl Grijalva. In an interview with Teen Vogue, she explained that she had been considering contesting the primary for the seat in 2026, but decided to run in the special election because her "lived experience differentiates me from people in the field" and because "we need young people with a real sense of urgency at this moment". She also explained her campaign as either "crashout or Congress". She participated in a televised debate with the other primary candidates on June 10, 2025.

Foxx's campaign was described as an "uphill climb" by The Washington Post, who noted that her "digital footprint exceeds her presence on the ground". The majority of her funding was from small donors, under $200, with the average about $29. This earned her comparisons to the campaigns of progressive politicians such as Alexandria Ocasio-Cortez and Bernie Sanders (though both endorsed her opponent Adelita Grijalva, Raúl's daughter). Foxx said she saw Ocasio-Cortez and Jasmine Crockett as leaders who "best represent the values of the party". Foxx was endorsed by LPAC, ASPIRE PAC, and Leaders We Deserve PAC, the latter of which is led by David Hogg. She raised more than $600,000 overall with 74.5% coming from unitemized individual contributions totalling less than $200 but only 16% from within the state of Arizona according to an analysis from Arizona Public Media.

On July 15, Foxx was defeated by Grijalva in the primary election and underperformed compared to the polls (one of which had her at 35%) finishing 42 points behind, at second, with 22.4% of the vote.

== Electoral history ==
=== 2025 ===
2025 Arizona's 7th congressional district special election Democratic primary
Party	Candidate	Votes	%
Democratic	Adelita Grijalva	38,679	61.5%
Democratic	Deja Foxx	14,078	22.4%
Democratic	Daniel Hernández Jr.	8,541	13.6%
Democratic	Patrick Harris	925	1.5%
Democratic	Jose Malvido Jr.	687	1.1%
Total votes		62,910	100.00%

== Modeling career ==
Foxx has said she uses style "as a way to push [against traditional notions of] respectability, professionalism, and what it means to really own my body." In 2018, she was named as a face of Rebecca Minkoff bags as part of the "I Am Many" campaign. In May 2019, Foxx was named a MAC Cosmetics Viva Glam ambassador, a lipstick brand that donates a portion of the proceeds of its sales to fighting HIV/AIDS. Foxx was signed to Ford Models as a digital creator after the 2020 presidential election campaign.
