= Consuelo Hernandez (politician) =

American politician

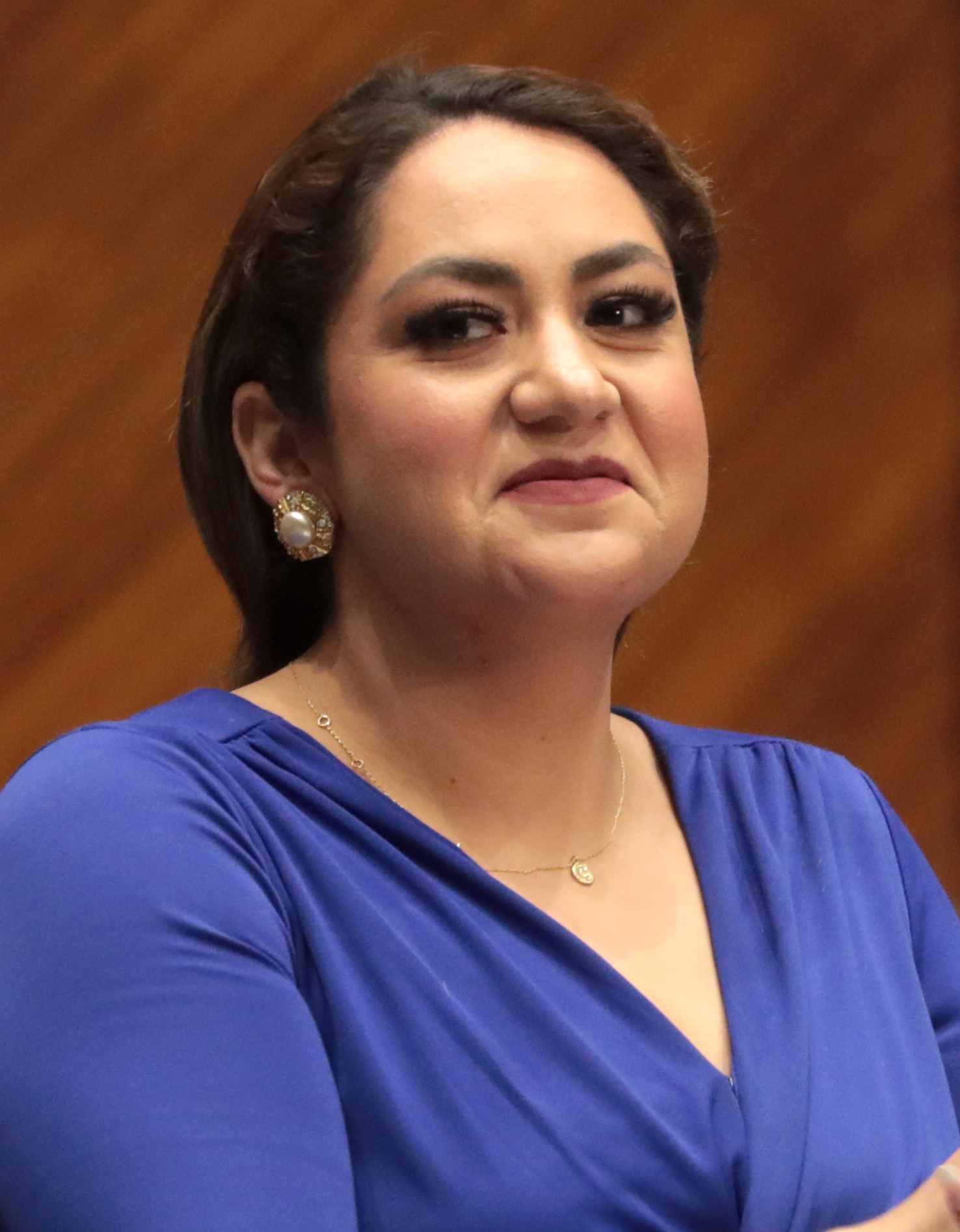
- Hernandez in 2023

Member of the Arizona House of Representatives from the 21st district
- Incumbent
- Assumed office January 9, 2023 Serving with Stephanie Stahl Hamilton
- Preceded by: Kevin Payne

Personal details
- Born: April 23, 1992 (age 34) Sunnyside, Arizona, U.S.
- Party: Democratic
- Relatives: Alma Hernandez (sister); Daniel Hernández Jr. (brother)
- Education: Arizona State University, Tempe (BA); University of Arizona (MA)

Consuelo Hernandez (born April 23, 1992) is an American politician. She is a Democratic member of the Arizona House of Representatives elected to represent District 21 in 2022. She is president of the Sunnyside Unified School District.

== Early life ==
Hernandez was raised in Pima County, Arizona, and attended Sunnyside schools. She completed a bachelor's degree in global health from the Arizona State University. Hernandez earned a master's in legal studies with a concentration in economics from the University of Arizona.

Hernandez is of Mexican-Jewish descent. She and her sister Alma Hernandez converted to Judaism after learning their maternal grandfather was Jewish. She attends Congregation Chaverim in Tucson, Arizona. Daniel Hernández Jr. is her brother.

Hernandez is president of the Sunnyside Unified School District.

== Career ==
In 2020, Consuelo unsuccessfully ran against Adelita Grijalva, the daughter of Congressman Raul Grijalva, for a seat on the Pima County Board of Supervisors.

In 2022, Consuelo successfully ran for the Arizona House of Representatives.

In April 2023, Hernandez was one of five House Democrats who voted to override Governor Katie Hobbs' veto of HB2509, a bill that would have legalized sales of "cottage foods" and became well-known nationally as the "Tamale Bill." The veto override failed by 5 votes, with 12 Democrats changing their vote from the original House vote to the override.
