= ASPIRE PAC =

Political action committee

- Formation: 2011
- Members: 19
- PAC Chair: Marilyn Strickland
- Affiliations: Democratic
- Website: aspirepac.org

The ASPIRE PAC (short for Asian Americans and Pacific Islanders Rising and Empowering Political Action Committee), formerly known as the Congressional Asian Pacific American Caucus Leadership PAC (CAPAC Leadership PAC), is an American political action committee focused on supporting Democratic-affiliated candidates of Asian American and Pacific Islander descent and those that support and promote the issues of the AAPI community. Founded in 2011, it is the political arm of the Congressional Asian Pacific American Caucus.

== History ==
=== 2012 ===
Through its support, the PAC welcomed six newly elected AAPI Members of Congress in the 2012 Elections: Mazie Hirono, Ami Bera, Tammy Duckworth, Tulsi Gabbard, Grace Meng and Mark Takano.

=== 2014 ===
In the 2014 Elections, the PAC supported and welcomed new members Ted Lieu and Mark Takai.

=== 2016 ===
In April 2016, Grace Meng was elected as PAC Chair, succeeding founder Judy Chu. Chu became Immediate Past PAC Chair and continued her duties as Chair of the Congressional Asian Pacific American Caucus, the official Congressional caucus.

==== Endorsed candidates ====
- Hillary Clinton for President of the United States
- Tammy Duckworth for Senate (IL)
- Chris Van Hollen for Senate (MD)
- Ami Bera for Congress (CA-07)
- Mike Honda for Congress (CA-17)
- Pramila Jayapal for Congress (WA-07)
- Raja Krishnamoorthi for Congress (IL-08)
- Grace Napolitano for Congress (CA-32)
- Scott Peters for Congress (CA-52)

=== 2020 ===
==== Endorsements ====
- Pritesh Gandhi (TX-10)
- Jackie Gordon (NY-2)
- Gina Ortiz Jones (TX-23)
- Kai Kahele (HI-2)
- Sri Preston Kulkarni (TX-22)
- Hiral Tipirneni (AZ-6)
- Candace Valenzuela (TX-24)
- Sima Ladjevardian (TX-2)

=== 2026 ===
==== Endorsements ====
In May 2025, ASPIRE PAC announced several endorsements in competitive primaries for the 2026 United States House of Representatives elections, including: Sanjyot Dunung, Eric Chung, Deja Foxx (for a 2025 special election), Anuj Dixit, Esther Kim Varet, and Amish Shah. It also backed Raja Krishnamoorthi in the primary election for Illinois' open U.S. Senate seat.

== Leadership ==
As of May 2025:

=== Board members ===
- Chair: Marilyn Strickland (D-WA-10)
- Immediate Past Chair: Grace Meng (D-NY-6)
- Vice-Chair: Jill Tokuda (D-HI-2)
- Judy Chu (D-CA-27)
- Tammy Duckworth (D-IL)
- Mazie Hirono (D-HI)
- Ami Bera (D-CA-7)
- Pramila Jayapal (D-WA-7)
- Ro Khanna (D-CA-17)
- Andy Kim (D-NJ)
- Raja Krishnamoorthi (D-IL-8)
- Ted Lieu (D-CA-33)
- Doris Matsui (D-CA-6)
- Bobby Scott (D-VA-3)
- Mark Takano (D-CA-41)
- Shri Thanedar (D-MI-13)
- Dave Min (D-CA-47)
- Derek Tran (D-CA-45)
- Suhas Subramanyam (D-VA-10)

=== List of chairs ===
- 2024-present: Marilyn Strickland (D-WA-10)
- (2016-2024): Grace Meng (D-NY-6)
- (2011-2016): Judy Chu (D-CA-27

== See also ==
- Asian Pacific Americans in the United States Congress
- Congressional Asian Pacific American Caucus
