= Adelita Grijalva =

American politician (born 1970)

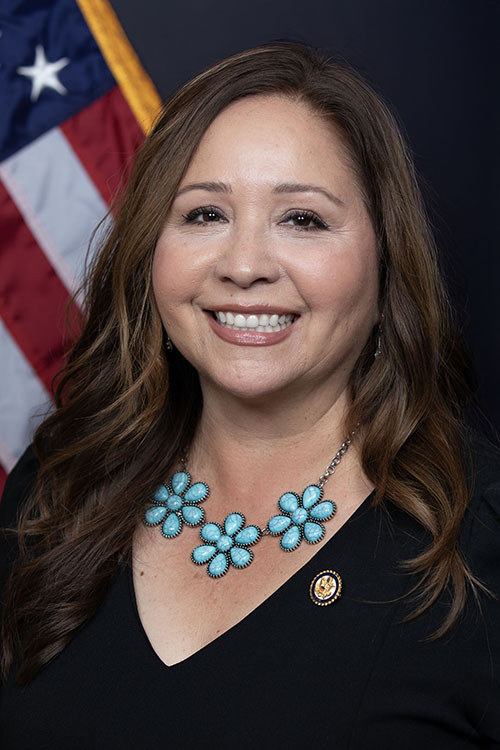
- Official portrait, 2025

Member of the U.S. House of Representatives from Arizona's 7th district
- Incumbent
- Assumed office November 12, 2025
- Preceded by: Raúl Grijalva

Member of the Pima County Board of Supervisors from the 5th district
- In office January 1, 2021 – April 4, 2025
- Preceded by: Betty Villegas
- Succeeded by: Andrés Cano

Personal details
- Born: Adelita Shirley Grijalva; October 30, 1970 (age 56) Tucson, Arizona, U.S.
- Party: Democratic
- Spouse: Sol Gómez
- Children: 3
- Relatives: Raúl Grijalva (father)
- Education: University of Arizona (BA)
- Website: House website Campaign website

Adelita Shirley Grijalva (born October 30, 1970) is an American politician who has served as the U.S. representative for Arizona's 7th congressional district since November 12, 2025. A member of the Democratic Party, she previously served as a member of the Pima County Board of Supervisors for District 5 from 2021 to 2025 and on the Tucson Unified School District Governing Board from 2002 to 2022. She is the daughter of former U.S. representative Raúl Grijalva, who represented the district from 2003 until his death in 2025.

On September 23, 2025, Grijalva was elected to the U.S. House of Representatives in a special election to succeed her father, defeating Republican nominee Daniel Butierez. In a move widely criticized by Democrats, the speaker of the House, Mike Johnson, refused to swear her in, promising to delay the swearing-in until the end of the 2025 United States federal government shutdown, which began the week after she won the special election. She was sworn in on November 12 after a seven-week delay, the longest in congressional history.

== Early life and education ==
Grijalva is a native Tucsonan, the granddaughter of a bracero who came to the United States from Mexico in 1945 and the eldest daughter of her congressional predecessor, former U.S. representative Raúl Grijalva. She graduated from Pueblo High School in 1989 and the University of Arizona with a Bachelor of Arts degree in political science in 1995.

Grijalva served as director of the non-profit juvenile diversion program Pima County Teen Court for 25 years.

== Earlier political career ==
=== Tucson Unified School District Governing Board ===
Grijalva was the youngest woman ever elected to the Tucson Unified School District Governing Board in 2002, serving for 18 years, making her one of the longest-serving TUSD Board members in history. In 2008 she received Advocate of the Year from the Arizona School Counselors Association for her tireless advocacy to keep counselors in schools. She voted against firing the co-founder and director of Tucson Unified School District's Mexican American Studies program, and was the only board member who voted against shutting down its Mexican American Studies classes in 2012.

=== Pima County Board of Supervisors ===
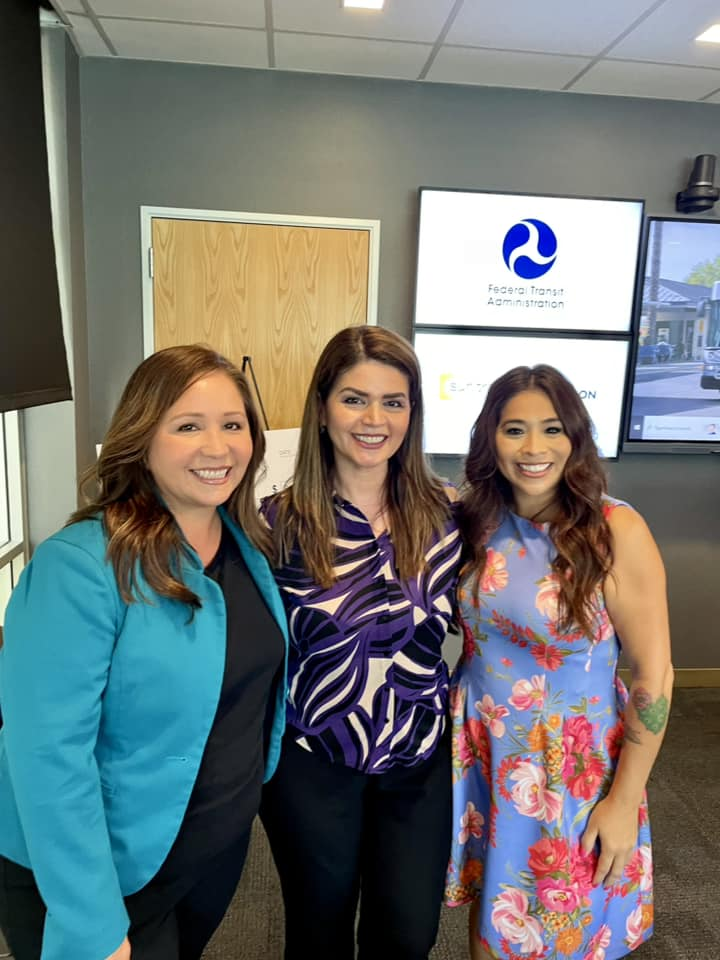
Grijalva (left) with Tucson mayor Regina Romero (center) in 2024

Grijalva was elected to the Pima County Board of Supervisors in 2020 with 73.60% of the vote. In office, she focused on recovering from the impacts of the COVID-19 pandemic; centering safety, affordable housing and strong job creation as key to recovery efforts. She served as Chair and Vice-Chair during her time on the board, making a strong commitment to working with community to create a coalition to address the biggest issues facing Pima County, particularly housing people can afford, education, climate, water resiliency, and healthy and safe communities.

Grijalva successfully pushed for the board to open meetings with a land acknowledgement to the indigenous Tohono O'odham Nation and Pascua Yaqui Tribe. She was appointed chair of the board in 2023, previously serving as vice chair for the two years prior, making her the first Latina to hold the position.

Due to Arizona's resign-to-run law, she announced her resignation from the Board effective April 4, 2025, to run for the U.S. House of Representatives. Andrés Cano was appointed by the board to succeed her.

== U.S. House of Representatives ==
=== Tenure ===
==== ICE pepper spray incident ====
On December 5, 2025, Grijalva was allegedly pepper sprayed by an ICE agent at the scene of an ICE raid on a Mexican restaurant in Tucson. Grijalva said she was making inquiries about the raid and identified herself as a member of Congress, but was still pepper sprayed by a "very aggressive" agent. Department of Homeland Security spokeswoman Tricia McLaughlin claimed that Grijalva was "in the vicinity" of a third party who was pepper sprayed for "obstructing and assaulting law enforcement".

=== Elections ===
==== 2025 special ====
On March 31, 2025, Grijalva announced that she was launching a campaign for the seat vacated by the death of her father, longtime U.S. Representative Raúl Grijalva, to pursue the Democratic nomination for Arizona's 7th congressional district in a 2025 special election. Grijalva met her signature goal in the first five hours of her congressional campaign, making her the first candidate to appear on the ballot. Grijalva said Congress should be reining in President Donald Trump as he cuts the federal government workforce, claws back grant dollars and guts agencies like the U.S. Department of Education. She criticized plans for a new copper mine at Oak Flat, a project that refused to consider concerns by the San Carlos Apache Tribe and others that the land was necessary for their ceremonies. She received endorsements from leaders including Bernie Sanders, the Congressional Progressive Caucus, and a number of Tucson City Council members, Pima County Supervisors, and state lawmakers.

On July 15, 2025, Grijalva won the Democratic primary, defeating Deja Foxx, Daniel Hernández Jr., and two other lesser known candidates.

On September 23, 2025, Grijalva won the special election by a 2–1 margin, defeating Republican Daniel Butierez (whom her father had defeated the previous November), Green Eduardo Quintana, and No Labels candidate Richard Grayson. She is the first Latina to represent Arizona in Congress.

===== Delayed swearing-in =====
Grijalva's swearing-in was delayed by 50 days, which set a new record for any member who entered the House after winning a special election. The previous record holder, Representative Jimmy Gomez who won a special election in 2017, requested to delay his swearing in due to family issues he was facing. He was sworn in 35 days after his election victory.

Speaker of the House Mike Johnson has given various reasons for the delay:

- Although the election result was not in dispute, Johnson's initial excuse for the delay was to wait until the election result was certified. Johnson did not use this excuse to delay swearing in James Walkinshaw, Jimmy Patronis, and Randy Fine, who, similarly to Grijalva, were elected in special elections during the 119th Congress, but were sworn in the day after their victories.
- Johnson then said she could not be sworn in until the House returned from recess, in spite of a precedent in the 119th Congress in which new members were sworn in the day after their special election, while the House was not in session.
  - Johnson extended the House recess for another week after the Senate failed to pass a continuing resolution to fund the government and end the federal government shutdown.
- Grijalva's swearing-in was scheduled for October 7 but was delayed when Johnson declared a "district work period" from October 7–13. The swearing-in was rescheduled for October 14 which he likewise postponed, even though, on this day Adrian Fontes, the Arizona Secretary of State, certified the election result, satisfying Johnson's original criterion.
  - On October 16, Johnson said he would not bring the House back into session until the government shutdown was over. On November 12, a few hours ahead of a vote in the Senate bill to end the government shutdown, Johnson finally allowed Grijalva to be sworn in.

====== Democratic response ======
Democrats have criticized the delay as political and specifically motivated by Grijalva's promise to sign the discharge petition to force a vote on the Epstein Files Transparency Act as her signature would be the 218th signature, which is the minimum number of signatures required for the petition to go into effect and force a vote. (Note: When Grijalva was eventually sworn in on November 12, she had Elizabeth Stein and Jessica Michaels, two victims of Epstein's abuse, as her guests sitting in the House gallery. Grijalva then immediately signed the discharge petition.)

On October 16, Grijalva posted a video to X in which she reported that she had received the keys to her office, but had not received passcodes to her government computers nor a government email address. On the same day that Grijalva posted the video, Johnson responded that he will not swear her in until the government shutdown is over, adding that "she should be working for her constituents. I don't know what she's doing. I keep seeing their political stunt videos, and they're knocking on the door, and she's not there. She should be in her office."

On October 21, Arizona Attorney General Kris Mayes, a Democrat, filed a lawsuit against Johnson, seeking to force him to swear in Grijalva under the rationale that the delay is depriving the residents of Grijalva's district of congressional representation. Grijalva joined the lawsuit.

On November 6, Grijalva penned an editorial published by USA Today in which she criticized Johnson for keeping the House adjourned as a justification to delay her swearing-in.

==== 2026 ====
On September 24, 2025, the day after winning the special election, she announced on Major Garrett's podcast, The Takeout, that she will run for election to a full term in 2026.

=== Committee assignments ===
Upon her swearing-in, Rep. Grijalva was appointed to the following committees:

- Committee on Education and Workforce
  - Subcommittee on Early Childhood, Elementary, and Secondary Education
  - Subcommittee on Higher Education and Workforce Development
- Committee on Natural Resources
  - Subcommittee on Energy and Mineral Resources
  - Subcommittee on Indian and Insular Affairs

=== Caucus memberships ===
- Congressional Equality Caucus
- Congressional Progressive Caucus
- Congressional Hispanic Caucus

== Political positions ==
=== Healthcare ===
Grijalva is a supporter of a single-payer Medicare for All program.

=== Israel–Palestine ===
In October 2023, the Pima County Board of Supervisors was presented with two resolutions regarding the Gaza war. One motion reaffirmed Israel's right to self-defense and stood with their retaliatory efforts, while the other mirrored the same type of language, except showed support for the Palestinian people. Although Grijalva attempted to add language around supporting civilians and humanitarian aid, it was "respectfully declined" by Sharon Bronson and Steve Christy, two other Pima County Supervisors.

In a debate with her Republican opponent for the 2025 special election, Grijalva accused the Israeli government of committing genocide against Palestinians in Gaza.

Upon taking office, Grijalva co-sponsored the Block the Bombs Act, which would halt military aid to Israel.

=== Rural funding ===
On December 9, 2025, Grijalva voted in favor of the Secure Rural Schools Reauthorization Act of 2025. The act passed overwhelmingly in the chamber, passing in a vote of 399–5. The act extends federal payments to rural counties to support schools, roads, and local services.

== Personal life ==
Grijalva lives in Tucson with her husband Sol Gómez, a librarian, and their three children.

== Electoral history ==
=== 2020 ===
2020 Pima County Board of Supervisors 5th district election
Primary election
Party	Candidate	Votes	%
Democratic	Adelita Grijalva	18,834	67.3%
Democratic	Consuelo Hernandez	9,066	32.4%
Write-in		73	0.3%
Total votes		27,973	100.0%
General election
Democratic	Adelita Grijalva	56,266	73.5%
Republican	Fernando Gonzales	20,179	26.3%
Write-in		143	0.2%
Total votes		76,588	100.0%

=== 2024 ===
2024 Pima County Board of Supervisors 5th district election
Primary election
Party	Candidate	Votes	%
Democratic	Adelita Grijalva (incumbent)	19,418	99.0%
Write-in		196	1.0%
Total votes		19,614	100.0%
General election
Democratic	Adelita Grijalva (incumbent)	54,700	73.3%
Independent	Val Romero	19,524	26.2%
Write-in		375	0.5%
Total votes		74,599	100.0%

=== 2025 ===
2025 Arizona's 7th congressional district special election
Primary election
Party	Candidate	Votes	%
Democratic	Adelita Grijalva	38,679	61.5%
Democratic	Deja Foxx	14,078	22.4%
Democratic	Daniel Hernández Jr.	8,541	13.6%
Democratic	Patrick Harris	925	1.5%
Democratic	Jose Malvido Jr.	687	1.1%
Total votes		62,910	100.0%
General election
Democratic	Adelita Grijalva	70,148	68.9%
Republican	Daniel Butierez	29,944	29.4%
Green	Eduardo Quintana	1,118	1.1%
No Labels	Richard Grayson	537	0.5%
Total votes		101,747	100.0%
Democratic hold			

== Notes ==
U.S. House of Representatives
Preceded by Raúl Grijalva	Member of the U.S. House of Representatives from Arizona's 7th congressional district 2025–present	Incumbent
U.S. order of precedence (ceremonial)
Preceded by James Walkinshaw	United States representatives by seniority 426th	Succeeded by Matt Van Epps
