= Arizona's 21st legislative district =

American legislative district

- Map of District 21: Approved January 21, 2022
- Senator: Rosanna Gabaldón (D)
- House members: Consuelo Hernandez (D); Stephanie Stahl Hamilton (D)
- Registration: 39.50% Democratic; 22.37% Republican; 36.59% Other
- Demographics: 31% White; 5% Black/African American; 2% Native American; 3% Asian; 58% Hispanic
- Population: 244,412
- Voting-age population: 182,589
- Registered voters: 130,490

Arizona's 21st legislative district is one of 30 in the state, consisting of sections of Cochise County, Pima County, and Santa Cruz County. As of 2023, there are 70 precincts in the district, with a total registered voter population of 130,490. The district has an overall population of 244,412.

Following the 2020 United States redistricting cycle, the Arizona Independent Redistricting Commission (AIRC) redrew legislative district boundaries in Arizona. The 21st district was drawn as a majority Latino constituency, with 58% of residents being Hispanic or Latino. According to the AIRC, the district is outside of competitive range and considered leaning Democratic.

== Political representation ==
The district is represented in the 56th Arizona State Legislature, which convenes from January 1, 2023, to December 31, 2024, by Rosanna Gabaldón (D-Sahuarita) in the Arizona Senate and by Consuelo Hernandez (D-Sunnyside) and Stephanie Stahl Hamilton (D-Tucson) in the Arizona House of Representatives.

Name	Image	Residence	Office	Party
Rosanna Gabaldón		Sahuarita	State senator	Democrat
Consuelo Hernandez		Sunnyside	State representative	Democrat
Stephanie Stahl Hamilton		Tucson	State representative	Democrat

== Election results ==
The 2022 elections were the first in the newly drawn district.

=== Arizona Senate ===
2022 Arizona's 21st Senate district election
Party	Candidate	Votes	%
Democratic	Rosanna Gabaldón (incumbent)	40,312	64.07
Republican	Jim Cleveland	22,604	35.93
Total votes		62,916	100
Democratic hold			

=== Arizona House of Representatives ===
2022 Arizona House of Representatives election, 21st district
Party	Candidate	Votes	%
Democratic	Consuelo Hernandez	36,567	33.12
Democratic	Stephanie Stahl Hamilton	33,231	30.10
Republican	Deborah McEwen	20,484	18.55
Republican	Damien Kennedy	20,125	18.23
Total votes		110,407	100.00
Democratic hold			
Democratic hold			

== See also ==
- List of Arizona legislative districts
- Arizona State Legislature
