= Congressional Progressive Caucus =

Caucus within the Democratic Party in the US Congress

- Abbreviation: CPC
- Chair: Greg Casar (TX–35)
- Founded: 1991; 35 years ago
- Ideology: Progressivism
- National affiliation: Democratic Party
- Colors: Blue; gold
- Seats in the Senate Democratic Caucus: 1 / 47
- Seats in the Senate: 1 / 100
- Seats in the House Democratic Caucus: 99 / 214 (Note: This figure does not include Eleanor Holmes Norton, a non-voting delegate who is a member of the caucus.)
- Seats in the House: 99 / 435

Website
- progressives.house.gov

The Congressional Progressive Caucus (CPC) is a congressional caucus affiliated with the Democratic Party in the United States Congress. The CPC represents the progressive faction of the Democratic Party. It was founded in 1991 and has grown since then, becoming the second-largest Democratic caucus in the House of Representatives.

As of September 25, 2026, the CPC has 101 members (99 voting representatives, one non-voting delegate, and one senator), making it the second-largest ideological caucus in the House Democratic Caucus by voting members, behind the New Democrat Coalition (which 30 members of the caucus are also members of). The CPC is chaired by U.S. representative Greg Casar (D-TX). In addition, the CPC is affiliated with the Congressional Progressive Caucus PAC, a political action committee which is led by members of the caucus.

== History ==
The CPC was established in 1991 by U.S. representatives Ron Dellums (D-CA), Lane Evans (D-IL), Thomas Andrews (D-ME), Peter DeFazio (D-OR), Maxine Waters (D-CA) and Bernie Sanders (I-VT). Additional representatives joined soon thereafter, including Major Owens (D-NY), Nydia Velázquez (D-NY), David Bonior (D-MI), Bob Filner (D-CA), Barney Frank (D-MA), Maurice Hinchey (D-NY), Jim McDermott (D-WA), Jerry Nadler (D-NY), Patsy Mink (D-HI), George Miller (D-CA), Pete Stark (D-CA), John Olver (D-MA), Nancy Pelosi (D-CA), and Lynn Woolsey (D-CA). Sanders was the first CPC chairman.

The founding CPC members were concerned about the economic hardship imposed by the deepening recession and the growing inequality brought about by the timidity of the Democratic Party response in the early 1990s. On January 3, 1995, at a standing room only news conference on Capitol Hill, they were the first group inside Congress to chart a comprehensive legislative alternative to U.S. speaker Newt Gingrich and the Republican Contract with America. The CPC's agenda was framed as "The Progressive Promise: Fairness".

=== List of chairs ===
Start	End	Co-Chair	Co-Chair
July 26, 1991	January 3, 1999	Bernie Sanders (VT)	
January 3, 1999	January 3, 2003	Dennis Kucinich (OH)	
January 3, 2003	January 3, 2005	Pete DeFazio (OR)	
January 3, 2005	January 3, 2009	Barbara Lee (CA)	Lynn Woolsey (CA)
January 3, 2009	January 3, 2011	Raúl Grijalva (AZ)	Lynn Woolsey (CA)
January 3, 2011	January 3, 2017	Raúl Grijalva (AZ)	Keith Ellison (MN)
January 3, 2017	January 3, 2019	Raúl Grijalva (AZ)	Mark Pocan (WI)
January 3, 2019	January 3, 2021	Pramila Jayapal (WA)	Mark Pocan (WI)
January 3, 2021	January 3, 2025	Pramila Jayapal (WA)	
January 3, 2025	present	Greg Casar (TX)	

== Leadership ==
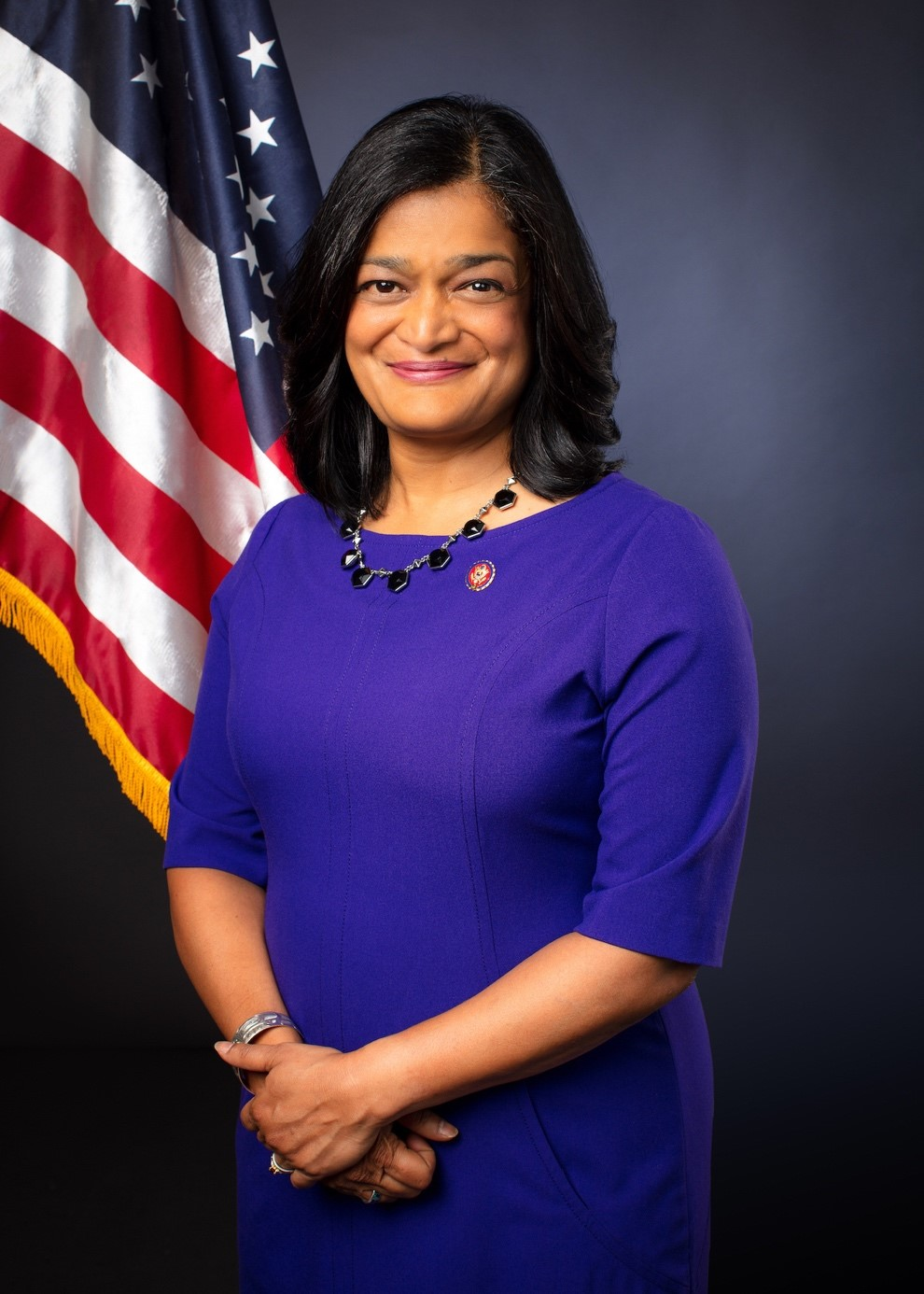
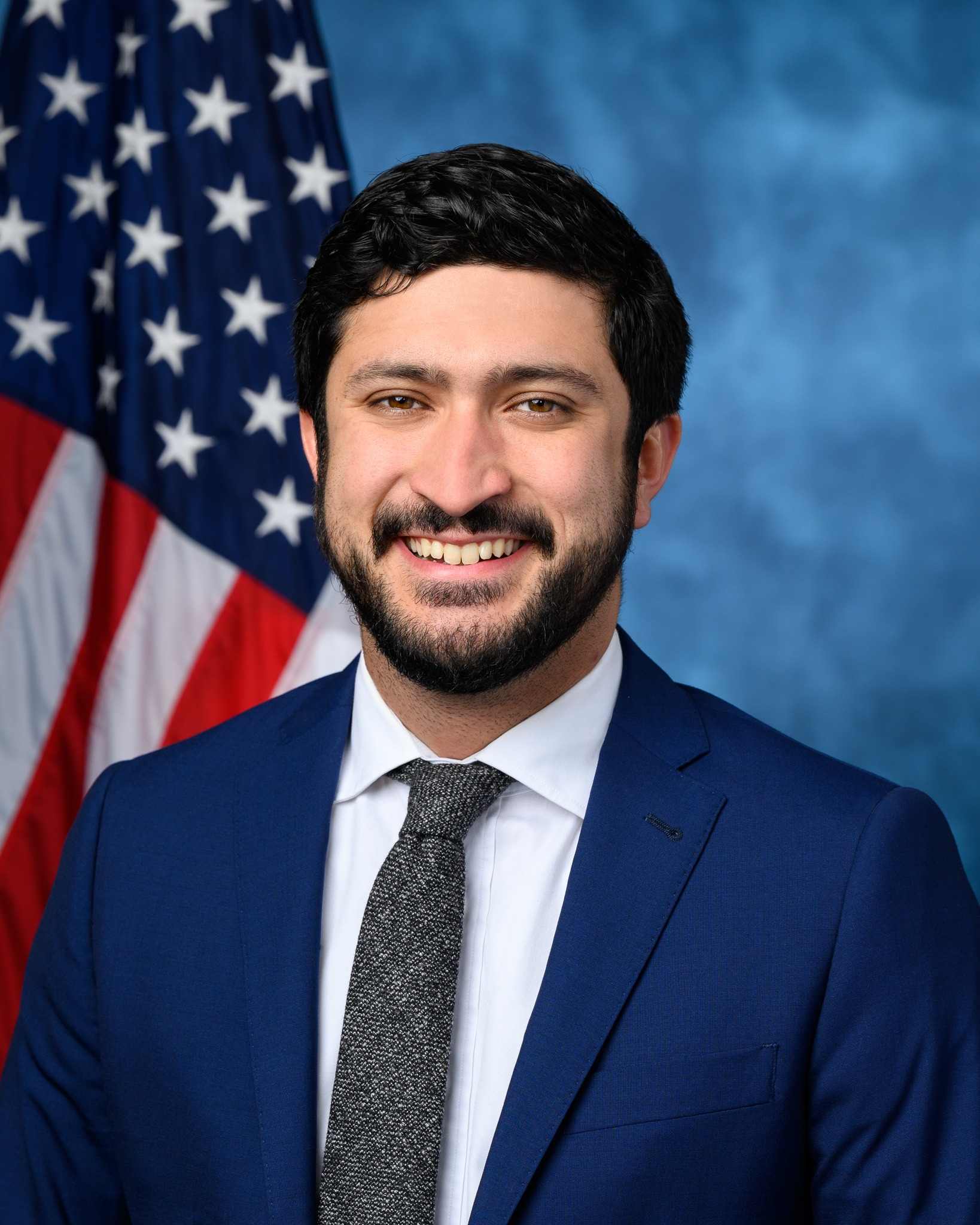
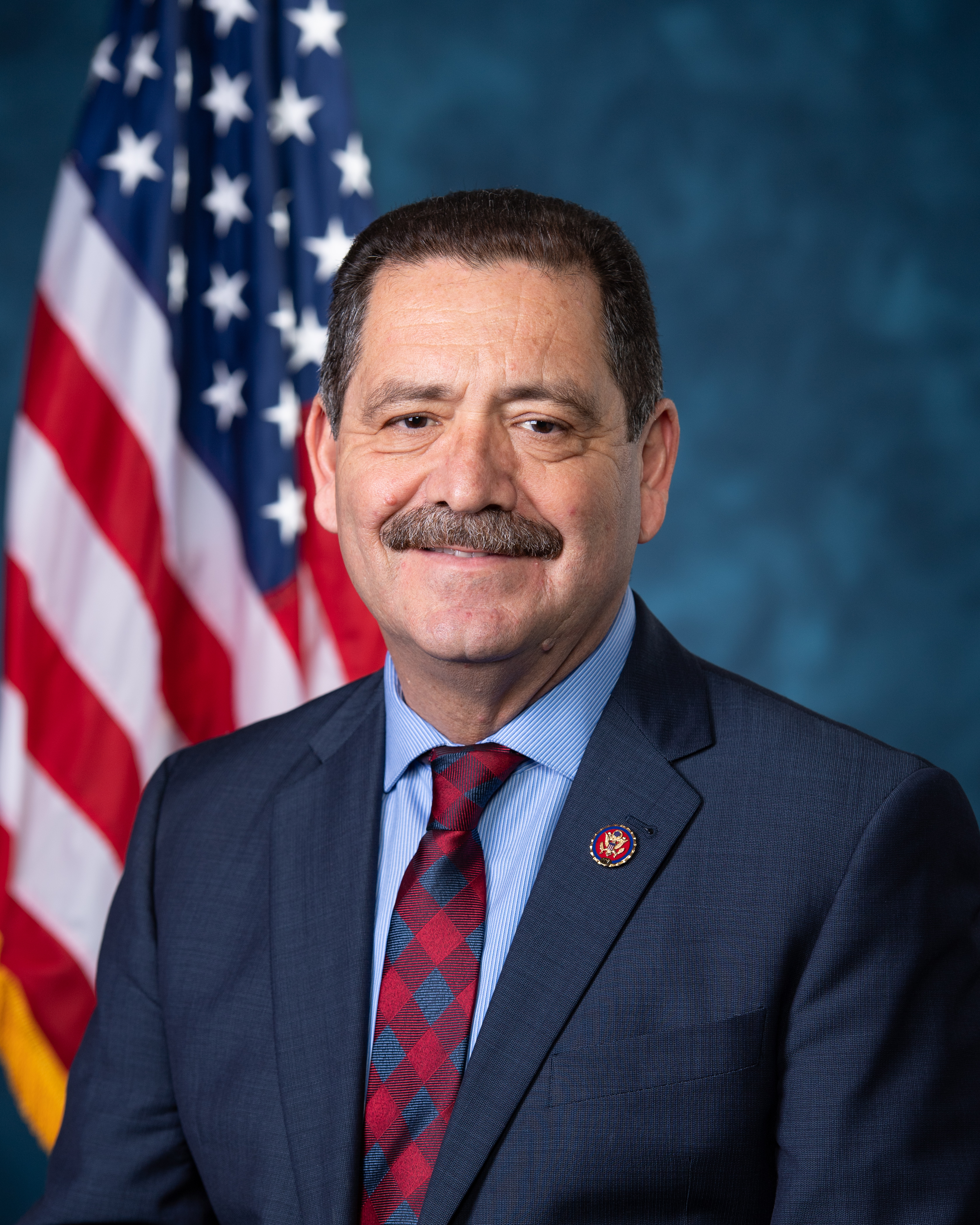
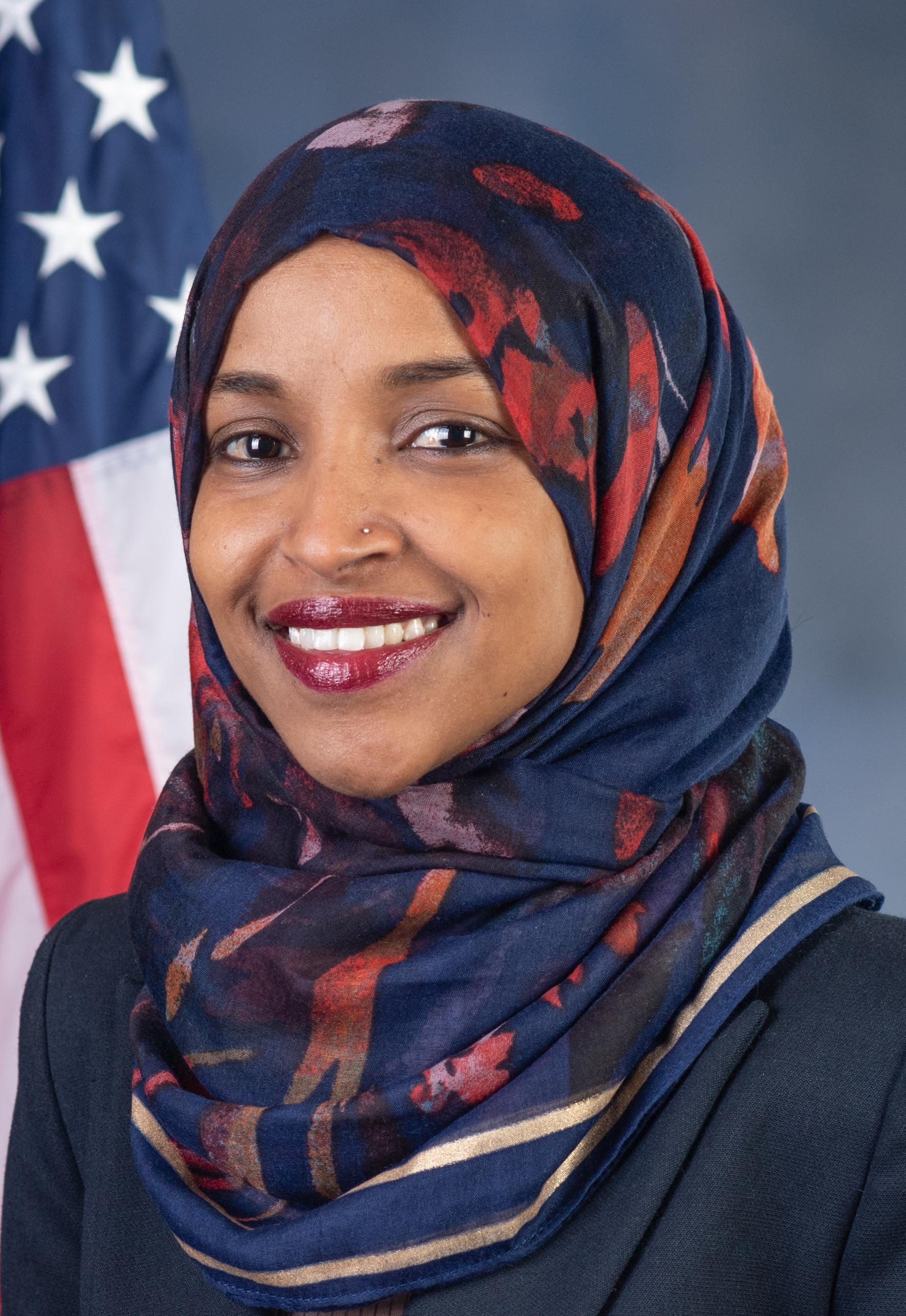
Chairwoman Pramila Jayapal (2019-2025), from Washington's 7th congressional district (top-left).
Current chairman Greg Casar, from Texas' 35th congressional district (top-middle).
Whip Chuy Garcia in 2019 (bottom-left).
Ilhan Omar in 2018 (bottom-right).

Chair: Greg Casar (D‑TX‑35)

Deputy Chair: Ilhan Omar (D‑MN‑5)

Whip: Chuy García (D‑IL‑4)

Chair Emeriti: Pramila Jayapal (D‑WA‑7) and Mark Pocan (D‑WI‑2)

Vice Chairs:

- Lloyd Doggett (D‑TX‑37)
- Maxwell Frost (D‑FL‑10)
- Jared Huffman (D‑CA‑2)
- Ro Khanna (D‑CA‑17)
- Morgan McGarvey (D‑KY‑3)
- Delia Ramirez (D‑IL‑3)
- Jan Schakowsky (D‑IL‑9)
- Lateefah Simon (D‑CA‑12)
- Mark Takano (D‑CA‑39)
- Rashida Tlaib (D‑MI‑12)

Executive Board Members at Large:

- Chris Deluzio (D‑PA‑17)
- Veronica Escobar (D‑TX‑16)
- Summer Lee (D‑PA‑12)
- Alexandria Ocasio-Cortez (D‑NY‑14)
- Bonnie Watson Coleman (D‑NJ‑12)

== Policy positions ==
The CPC advocates "a universal, high-quality, Medicare for All health care system for all", living wage laws, reductions in military expenditure, increased corporate regulation and taxes, ending mass incarceration, strong measures to reverse climate change, immigration reform and reparations. In March 2026, the CPC and NDC announced joint opposition to House Republican positions on social security benefits and health care coverage.

=== Economy ===
In April 2011, the CPC released a proposed "People's Budget" for fiscal year 2012. Two of its proponents stated: "By implementing a fair tax code, by building a resilient American economy, and by bringing our troops home, we achieve a budget surplus of over $30 billion by 2021 and we end up with a debt that is less than 65% of our GDP. This is what sustainability looks like".

In 2019, the Democratic-controlled House of Representatives passed H.R.582, The Raise the Wage Act, which would have gradually raised the minimum wage to $15 per hour. It was not taken up in the Republican-controlled Senate. In January 2021, Democrats in the Senate and House of Representatives reintroduced the bill. In February 2021, the Congressional Budget Office released a report on the Raise the Wage Act of 2021 which estimated that incrementally raising the federal minimum wage to $15 an hour by 2025 would benefit 17 million workers, but would also reduce employment by 1.4 million people. On February 27, 2021, the Democratic-controlled House passed the American Rescue Plan pandemic relief package, which included a gradual minimum wage increase to $15 per hour. The measure was ultimately removed from the Senate version of the bill due to violating the rules of budget reconciliation.

==== 2024 elections ====
Five weeks after the 2024 elections, Caucus chair-elect Greg Casar connected "serious discontent" with the Democratic Party to the "2008 housing crash", as manifested in Occupy Wall Street and certain aims for movements such as Black Lives Matter. According to Casar, Democratic Party leaders must redirect voter attentions away from the specter of "an asylum seeker trying to raise your rent" to "hedge funds just buying up neighborhoods, jacking up the rent and being deregulated by the Republicans." In a subsequent interview, the Texas labor advocate admitted that "the Democratic brand has been damaged" and outlined the Progressive Caucus strategy for a "rebrand".

Casar observed that, during the 2024 electoral campaigns, Republicans focused on "targeting and scapegoating a group of vulnerable people in order to make it sound like, in Middle America, that is all the Democratic Party works on and cares about." Casar pointed out that Nancy Mace, for instance, had already announced plans to regulate "which marble bathroom certain people can and can’t use, because she wants to distract the American people from the billionaire tax cut that she’s about to work on with Donald Trump." But he added that Democrats should not support "fighting for working people first" as an avenue for "throwing [another group of] vulnerable people under the bus."

In narrating authenticity, "what works is if we tell a clear and authentic story to the American people about why they feel screwed over." In response to such stories promulgated across the aisle, "We should point out that it wasn’t a trans person that denied your health insurance claim; it was a gigantic corporation that went unregulated by the Republicans. It’s not an undocumented immigrant raising your rent; it’s a Wall Street hedge fund that’s doing it, and Trump is appointing those guys to his Cabinet. I think the Progressive Caucus is ready to tell that kind of story."

Three months after the elections, the New Democrat Coalition expressed concerns about increasing numbers of Congressional Progressive Caucus members pursuing concurrent membership in the NDC. New Democrats did not address the number of previous and current members of the NDC attempting to maintain seats in both caucuses as well.

=== Health care ===
The Medicare for All Act is a bill first introduced in the United States House of Representatives by Representative John Conyers (D-MI) in 2003, with 38 co-sponsors. In 2019, the original 16-year-old proposal was renumbered, and Pramila Jayapal (D-WA) introduced a broadly similar but more detailed bill, HR 1384, in the 116th Congress. As of November 3, 2019, it had 116 co-sponsors still in the House at the time, or 49.8% of House Democrats.

The act would establish a universal single-payer health care system in the United States, the rough equivalent of Canada's Medicare and Taiwan's Bureau of National Health Insurance, among other examples. Under a single-payer system, most medical care would be paid for by the federal government, ending the need for private health insurance and premiums, and re-casting private insurance companies as providing purely supplemental coverage, to be used when non-essential care is sought. The national system would be paid for in part through taxes replacing insurance premiums, but also by savings realized through the provision of preventive universal health care and the elimination of insurance company overhead and hospital billing costs. On September 13, 2017, Senator Bernie Sanders (I-VT) introduced a parallel bill in the United States Senate, with 16 co-sponsors. The act would establish a universal single-payer health care system in the United States.

In 2019, the CPC challenged House speaker Nancy Pelosi regarding the details of a drug-pricing bill, the Elijah Cummings Lower Drug Costs Now Act. The final version was the result of extensive negotiations between House Democratic leadership and members of the CPC. The bill was introduced into the House of Representatives on September 19, 2019, during the 116th Congress by Rep. Frank Pallone (D-NJ). The bill received 106 co-sponsors. It passed the House on December 12, 2019, by a vote of (230-192). All Democrats voted for the measure, and all but 2 Republicans voted against it. The bill was then sent to the Senate. The Senate, having been controlled by Republicans, did not bring the bill up for a vote.

==== Abortion rights ====
During the 117th United States Congress, Congresswoman Judy Chu (CA-27) introduced the Women's Health Protection Act. The act would expand abortion rights and codify Roe v. Wade. It was introduced in response to the Texas Heartbeat Act. It passed House of Representatives (218–211), but was defeated in the Senate on a 46–48 vote in February 2022.

=== Climate change ===
A prominent 2019 attempt to get legislation passed for a Green New Deal was sponsored by Rep. Alexandria Ocasio-Cortez (D-NY) and Sen. Ed Markey (D-MA) during the 116th United States Congress, though it failed to advance in the Senate. Green New Deal proposals call for public policy to address climate change along with achieving other social aims like job creation and reducing economic inequality. The name refers back to the New Deal, a set of social and economic reforms and public works projects undertaken by President Franklin D. Roosevelt in response to the Great Depression. The Green New Deal combines Roosevelt's economic approach with modern ideas such as renewable energy and resource efficiency.

=== LGBTQ rights ===
In July 2022, the House Judiciary Committee chairman Jerrold Nadler (D-NY), Senator Dianne Feinstein (D-CA), Congressional LGBTQ+ Equality caucus chairman David Cicilline (D-RI), Senator Tammy Baldwin (D-WI) and Senator Susan Collins (R-ME) announced the re-introduction of the Respect for Marriage Act, which was revised to include protections for interracial marriages to codify Loving v. Virginia. The act passed the House (267–157) on July 19, 2022, with 47 Republicans joining all Democrats in voting in the affirmative.

The Senate considered the bill, but it was initially unclear if it would receive enough votes to end debate. On November 14, 2022, a group of bipartisan senators, including Rob Portman (R-OH), Kyrsten Sinema (D-AZ), Thom Tillis (R-NC), Tammy Baldwin (D-WI), and Susan Collins (R-ME) announced they had reached an amendment compromise to include language for religious protections and clarify that the bill did not legalize polygamy. The amendment specifies that nonprofit religious organizations will not be required to provide services for the solemnization or celebration of a marriage. Shortly after, Senate majority leader Chuck Schumer announced the Respect for Marriage Act would be put up for a full vote.

On November 16, 2022, the Senate invoked cloture on the motion to proceed (62–37) to the amended bill. All 50 Democratic senators and 12 Republicans (Roy Blunt, Richard Burr, Shelley Moore Capito, Susan Collins, Joni Ernst, Cynthia Lummis, Lisa Murkowski, Rob Portman, Mitt Romney, Dan Sullivan, Thom Tillis, and Todd Young) voted in favor of advancing the bill. On November 29, 2022, the Senate voted 61–36 to pass the bill. Voting in favor of the bill were 49 Democrats and the same 12 Republicans who had voted to advance it. Two Republicans (Ben Sasse and Patrick Toomey) and one Democrat (Raphael Warnock, who co-sponsored the bill) did not vote.

=== Foreign policy ===
==== Israel and Palestine ====
Representative Lois Frankel (FL-22) left the caucus on November 20, 2023, and Ritchie Torres (NY-15) left the caucus on February 21, 2024; both left over disagreements regarding support for Israel in the Gaza war. Both are described as staunch supporters of Israel. Twenty Democrats led by Summer Lee and Greg Casar, who was elected to lead the Congressional Caucus in 2025, are calling for support for U.S. legislation that would ban arming countries that block humanitarian aid.

==== 2022 Russian invasion of Ukraine ====
In October 2022, 30 members of the caucus urged the Biden administration to seek a negotiated, diplomatic end to the Russian invasion of Ukraine while advocating for continued economic and military support to Ukraine. The next day, after a wave of criticism, the letter was swiftly withdrawn on the basis that peaceful negotiations with Putin in current situation are "nearly impossible". Jayapal reasserted the Democrats' support for Ukraine and said the letter had been drafted several months ago and "released by staff without vetting".

== Membership ==
=== Electoral results ===
Congressional Progressive Caucus from the United States House of Representatives in the 119th United States Congress

Election year	Senate			House of Representatives		
Election year	Democratic Caucus	±	%	Democratic Caucus	±	%
2010	2 / 53		3.8%	77 / 193		39.9%
2012	1 / 55	▼1	1.8%	68 / 200	▼9	34.0%
2014	1 / 46	Steady	2.2%	68 / 188	Steady	36.2%
2016	1 / 48	Steady	2.1%	78 / 193	▲10	40.4%
2018	1 / 47	Steady	2.1%	96 / 233	▲18	41.2%
2020	1 / 50	Steady	2.0%	95 / 220	▼1	43.2%
2022	1 / 51	Steady	2.0%	100 / 213	▲5	46.9%
2024	1 / 47	Steady	2.13%	96 / 215	▼4	44.7%
2026	1 / 56	Steady	1.79%	107 / 260	▲11	41.2%

All members are Democrats or caucus with the Democratic Party. In the 119th Congress, there are currently 101 declared progressives, including 99 voting representatives, 1 non-voting delegate, and 1 senator.

=== Current members ===
==== Senate ====
State	Party	CPVI	Member
Vermont	Independent	D+17	Bernie Sanders

==== House ====
State	District	CPVI	Member	Also a member of	Notes
Arizona	AZ-3	D+22	Yassamin Ansari		
Arizona	AZ-7	D+13	Adelita Grijalva		
California	CA-2	D+13	Jared Huffman		
California	CA-8	D+19	John Garamendi		
California	CA-10	D+18	Mark DeSaulnier		
California	CA-12	D+39	Lateefah Simon		
California	CA-14	D+19	Aisha Wahab		
California	CA-15	D+26	Kevin Mullin	New Democrat Coalition	
California	CA-17	D+21	Ro Khanna		
California	CA-19	D+18	Jimmy Panetta	New Democrat Coalition	
California	CA-28	D+14	Judy Chu		
California	CA-29	D+19	Luz Rivas		
California	CA-30	D+21	Laura Friedman		
California	CA-32	D+14	Brad Sherman	New Democrat Coalition	
California	CA-34	D+28	Jimmy Gomez		
California	CA-36	D+21	Ted Lieu		
California	CA-37	D+33	Sydney Kamlager-Dove		
California	CA-38	D+9	Linda Sánchez		
California	CA-39	D+7	Mark Takano		
California	CA-42	D+8	Robert Garcia		
California	CA-43	D+27	Maxine Waters		
California	CA-44	D+20	Nanette Barragán		
California	CA-47	D+6	Dave Min		
California	CA-49	D+7	Mike Levin	New Democrat Coalition	
California	CA-51	D+10	Sara Jacobs	New Democrat Coalition	
California	CA-52	D+11	Juan Vargas	New Democrat Coalition	
Colorado	CO-1	D+29	Diana DeGette		Lost renomination
Colorado	CO-2	D+20	Joe Neguse		
Connecticut	CT-3	D+8	Rosa DeLauro		
Delaware	DE-AL	D+8	Sarah McBride	New Democrat Coalition	
District of Columbia	DC-AL	D+44	Eleanor Holmes Norton		Retiring
Florida	FL-9	R+8	Darren Soto	New Democrat Coalition	
Florida	FL-10	D+13	Maxwell Frost		
Florida	FL-24	D+22	Frederica Wilson		Retiring
Georgia	GA-4	D+27	Hank Johnson		
Georgia	GA-5	D+36	Nikema Williams	New Democrat Coalition	
Georgia	GA-13	D+21	Everton Blair		Lost renomination
Hawaii	HI-2	D+12	Jill Tokuda		
Illinois	IL-1	D+18	Jonathan Jackson		
Illinois	IL-3	D+17	Delia Ramirez	The Squad	
Illinois	IL-4	D+17	Jesús García		Retiring
Illinois	IL-7	D+34	Danny Davis		Retiring
Illinois	IL-9	D+19	Jan Schakowsky		Retiring
Indiana	IN-7	D+21	André Carson	New Democrat Coalition	
Kentucky	KY-3	D+10	Morgan McGarvey	New Democrat Coalition	
Louisiana	LA-2	D+25	Troy Carter	New Democrat Coalition	
Maine	ME-1	D+11	Chellie Pingree		
Maryland	MD-7	D+31	Kweisi Mfume		
Maryland	MD-8	D+30	Jamie Raskin		
Massachusetts	MA-2	D+13	Jim McGovern		
Massachusetts	MA-3	D+11	Lori Trahan	New Democrat Coalition	
Massachusetts	MA-7	D+34	Ayanna Pressley	The Squad	
Michigan	MI-6	D+12	Debbie Dingell		
Michigan	MI-12	D+21	Rashida Tlaib	The Squad	
Michigan	MI-13	D+22	Shri Thanedar	New Democrat Coalition	Lost renomination
Minnesota	MN-5	D+32	Ilhan Omar	The Squad	
Nevada	NV-4	D+2	Steven Horsford	New Democrat Coalition	
New Jersey	NJ-1	D+10	Donald Norcross	New Democrat Coalition	
New Jersey	NJ-6	D+5	Frank Pallone		
New Jersey	NJ-9	D+2	Nellie Pou	New Democrat Coalition	
New Jersey	NJ-10	D+27	LaMonica McIver		
New Jersey	NJ-11	D+7	Analilia Mejia		
New Jersey	NJ-12	D+13	Bonnie Watson Coleman		Retiring
New Mexico	NM-1	D+7	Melanie Stansbury		
New Mexico	NM-3	D+3	Teresa Leger Fernandez		
New York	NY-6	D+6	Grace Meng		
New York	NY-7	D+25	Nydia Velázquez		Retiring
New York	NY-9	D+22	Yvette Clarke		
New York	NY-10	D+32	Dan Goldman	New Democrat Coalition	Lost renomination
New York	NY-12	D+33	Jerry Nadler		Retiring
New York	NY-13	D+32	Adriano Espaillat		Lost renomination
New York	NY-14	D+19	Alexandria Ocasio-Cortez	The Squad	
New York	NY-20	D+8	Paul Tonko		
North Carolina	NC-4	D+23	Valerie Foushee	New Democrat Coalition	
North Carolina	NC-12	D+24	Alma Adams		
Ohio	OH-11	D+28	Shontel Brown	New Democrat Coalition	
Oregon	OR-1	D+20	Suzanne Bonamici		
Oregon	OR-3	D+24	Maxine Dexter		
Oregon	OR-4	D+6	Val Hoyle	New Democrat Coalition	
Oregon	OR-6	D+6	Andrea Salinas	New Democrat Coalition	
Pennsylvania	PA-2	D+19	Brendan Boyle	New Democrat Coalition	
Pennsylvania	PA-3	D+40	Dwight Evans		Retiring
Pennsylvania	PA-4	D+8	Madeleine Dean	New Democrat Coalition	
Pennsylvania	PA-5	D+15	Mary Gay Scanlon	New Democrat Coalition	
Pennsylvania	PA-12	D+10	Summer Lee	The Squad	
Pennsylvania	PA-17	D+3	Chris Deluzio		
Texas	TX-16	D+11	Veronica Escobar	New Democrat Coalition	
Texas	TX-18	D+29	Christian Menefee		
Texas	TX-20	D+16	Joaquin Castro	New Democrat Coalition	
Texas	TX-30	D+25	Jasmine Crockett		Retiring
Texas	TX-37	D+30	Greg Casar	The Squad	
Texas	TX-37	D+30	Lloyd Doggett		Retiring
Vermont	VT-AL	D+17	Becca Balint		
Virginia	VA-4	D+17	Jennifer McClellan	New Democrat Coalition	
Virginia	VA-8	D+26	Don Beyer	New Democrat Coalition	
Washington	WA-6	D+10	Emily Randall	New Democrat Coalition	
Washington	WA-7	D+39	Pramila Jayapal		
Washington	WA-9	D+22	Adam Smith	New Democrat Coalition	
Wisconsin	WI-2	D+21	Mark Pocan		
Wisconsin	WI-4	D+26	Gwen Moore		

== Affiliate organizations ==
The CPC is affiliated with the Congressional Progressive Caucus PAC, a political action committee which was established in 2009 and is led by members of the caucus to endorse and fundraise for candidates. In 2018, the caucus established the Congressional Progressive Caucus Center and Progressive Caucus Action Fund, a 501(c)(3) and 501(c)(4), respectively, to coordinate messaging and policy initiatives between the caucus and supportive organizations.

== See also ==
- Blue Dog Coalition
- Democratic Socialists of America
- Factions in the Democratic Party (United States)
- Fight Club (U.S. Senate)
- New Democrat Coalition
- Progressive Democrats of America
- Republican Main Street Partnership
- Republican Governance Group
- Problem Solvers Caucus
- The Squad (United States Congress)
- Progressivism in the United States
