= Daniel Hernández Jr. =

American politician (born 1990)

Daniel Hernández
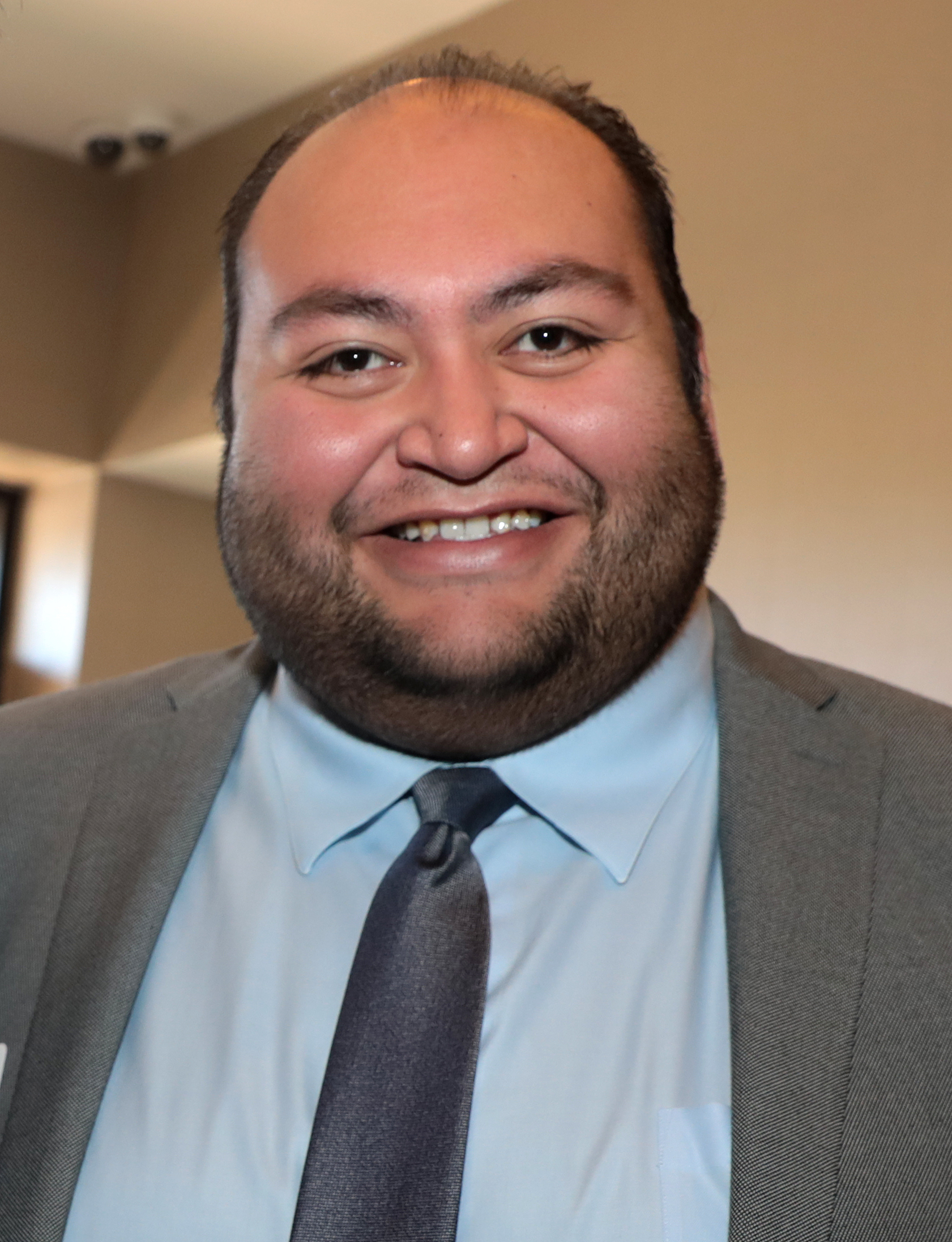
- Hernández in 2020

Member of the Arizona House of Representatives from the 2nd district
- In office January 9, 2017 – January 9, 2023
- Preceded by: J. Christopher Ackerley
- Succeeded by: Justin Wilmeth

Personal details
- Born: January 25, 1990 (age 36) Tucson, Arizona, U.S.
- Party: Democratic
- Relatives: Alma Hernandez (sister); Consuelo Hernandez (sister)
- Education: University of Arizona (BA, MLS)

Daniel Hernández Jr. (born January 25, 1990) is an American politician and former member of the Arizona House of Representatives. A member of the Arizona Democratic Party, he served alongside Rosanna Gabaldón in Legislative District 2. Hernández interned for U.S. Representative Gabby Giffords and was present when she was shot during a 2011 constituent meeting. He has been credited with helping to save Giffords's life after the incident. Hernandez has served as vice president of political programs at LGBTQ+ Victory Fund since January 2026 and, from 2017 to 2025, he served as the Government Affairs Director at Stand for Children of Arizona.

== Early life and education ==
Hernández was born in 1990 to Daniel Hernández Sr. and Consuelo Quiñones Hernández, a working-class family in Tucson, Arizona. He has two younger sisters, Consuelo and Alma Hernández.

In 2008, Hernández volunteered for the Hillary Clinton 2008 presidential campaign and Gabby Giffords' re-election campaign. He graduated from Sunnyside High School in 2008. Hernández earned a Bachelor of Arts degree in political science and a Master of Legal Studies from the University of Arizona.

== Career ==
In 2011, while a student at the University of Arizona, Hernández worked as an intern in the office of Gabby Giffords. During the first week of his internship, Hernández helped organize a "Congress on your Corner" event, which was the site of the 2011 Tucson shooting. After Giffords was shot in the head, Hernández held her up and stanched the bleeding with his hand until employees from the nearby grocery store brought him clean smocks. In doing so, he is credited with saving the congresswoman's life. Later that year, he was elected to the board of the Sunnyside Unified School District.

=== Arizona Legislature ===
In 2016, Hernández ran for the Arizona House of Representatives. He defeated Republican incumbent J. Christopher Ackerley in the general election alongside Democratic incumbent Rosanna Gabaldón. Together, Hernández and Gabaldon won the two seats of the Arizona House's 2nd District, with Hernández receiving 32,651 votes. Hernández and Gabaldon had previously defeated Aaron Baumann in the Democratic primary.

He was one of three openly gay members of the Arizona State Legislature, alongside Cesar Chavez and Robert Meza and is a co-founder of the LGBTQ Caucus in Arizona.

Hernández endorsed a 2016 ballot measure to legalize recreational marijuana in Arizona.

=== Congressional campaigns ===
On May 20, 2021, Hernández announced his candidacy in the 2022 United States House of Representatives elections in Arizona in the 6th congressional district. He lost to Kirsten Engel in the Democratic primary.

In 2025, he announced his candidacy in the 2025 Arizona's 7th congressional district special election. He placed third in the Democratic primary with 13.6% of the vote, losing to Adelita Grijalva.

== Political positions ==
Hernández has described himself as "pragmatic" and has expressed willingness to collaborate with Republicans.

The Arizona Sierra Club gave Hernández's voting record an A rating from 2017 to 2019 and a B rating from 2020 to 2021.

Hernández is strongly supportive of Israel and has described himself as a "pro-Israel activist."

Hernández has expressed support for increasing government presence at the Mexico–United States border through the use of drones sensors, and law enforcement officers (such as those of the United States Border Patrol).

== Personal life ==
Hernandez's maternal grandfather was a Mexican Jew. His family are members of a synagogue. Hernández is openly gay.
