= Sunnyside, Arizona =

- Populated place
- Location within the state of Arizona Sunnyside (the United States)
- Coordinates: 31°26′02″N 110°24′18″W
- Country: United States
- State: Arizona
- County: Cochise
- Elevation: 5,814 ft (1,772 m)
- Time zone: UTC-7 (Mountain (MST))
  - Summer (DST): UTC-7 (MST)
- Area code: 520
- FIPS code: 04-70575
- GNIS feature ID: 34962

Sunnyside is a populated place situated in the far west of Cochise County, Arizona, United States, located just north of the international border with Mexico. It has an estimated elevation of 5,814 feet (1,772 m) above sea level.

== History ==
Sunnyside was founded as a religious commune by Samuel Donnelly. Donnelly also co-founded the Copper Glance Mine. Donnelly's followers were known as Donnellites, a term Donnelly himself disliked. In 1900, Donnelly became sick with Bright's disease and died on April 14, 1901. By 1903, nearly everyone had left Sunnyside. Around 1912, the camp was revived as a ranching community.

Sunnyside's population in 1940 was 2 residents.

Although designated officially as a 'populated place', there are no inhabitants, and Sunnyside is known locally as a ghost town.
