= Raúl Grijalva =

American politician (1948–2025)

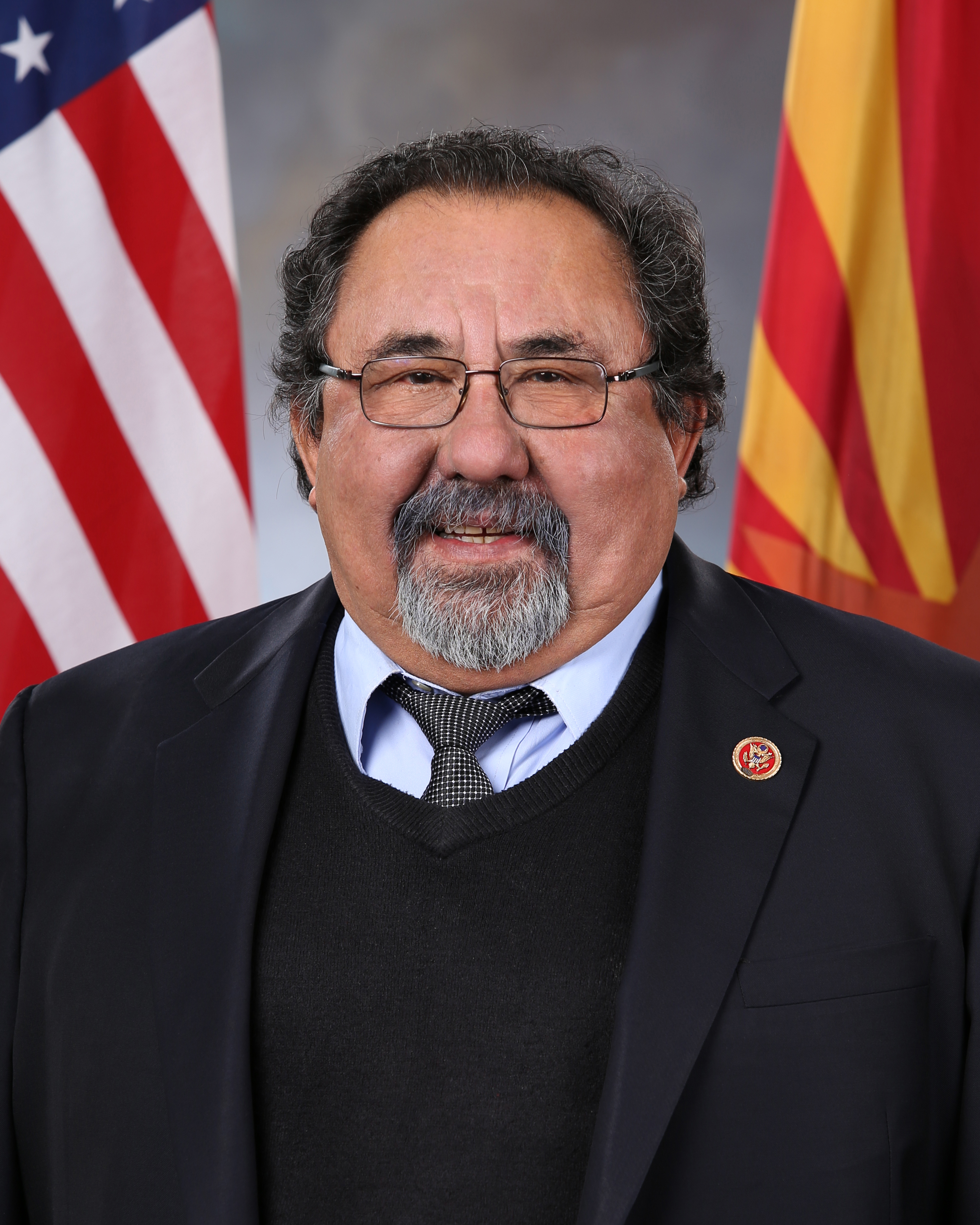
- Official portrait, 2014

Ranking Member of the House Natural Resources Committee
- In office January 3, 2023 – January 3, 2025
- Preceded by: Bruce Westerman
- Succeeded by: Jared Huffman
- In office January 3, 2015 – January 3, 2019
- Preceded by: Peter DeFazio
- Succeeded by: Rob Bishop

Chair of the House Natural Resources Committee
- In office January 3, 2019 – January 3, 2023
- Preceded by: Rob Bishop
- Succeeded by: Bruce Westerman

Co-Chair of the Congressional Progressive Caucus
- In office January 3, 2009 – January 3, 2019
- Preceded by: Barbara Lee
- Succeeded by: Pramila Jayapal

Member of the U.S. House of Representatives from Arizona
- In office January 3, 2003 – March 13, 2025
- Preceded by: Constituency established
- Succeeded by: Adelita Grijalva
- Constituency: 7th district (2003–2013); 3rd district (2013–2023); 7th district (2023–2025)

Personal details
- Born: Raúl Manuel Grijalva; February 19, 1948 Canoa Ranch, near Green Valley, Arizona, U.S.
- Died: March 13, 2025 (aged 77) Tucson, Arizona, U.S.
- Party: Raza Unida (before 1974); Democratic (1974–2025)
- Spouse: Ramona Grijalva (m. 1971)
- Children: 3, including Adelita
- Education: University of Arizona (BA)
- Grijalva's voice Grijalva on voting rights. Recorded September 20, 2012

Raúl Manuel Grijalva (/rɑːˈuːl ɡrɪˈhælvə/ rah-OOL grih-HAL-və; February 19, 1948 – March 13, 2025) was an American politician and activist who served as a member of the United States House of Representatives from Arizona from 2003 until his death in 2025. As member of the Democratic Party, Grijalva represented Arizona's 7th congressional district from 2003 to 2013, Arizona's 3rd congressional district from 2013 to 2023, and the 7th district again from 2023 to 2025. The two districts included the western third of Tucson, part of Yuma and Nogales, and some peripheral parts of metropolitan Phoenix.

In October 2024, Grijalva announced that he would not run for re-election in 2026, amid treatments for lung cancer, but died before he could complete his final term. The 2025 Arizona's 7th congressional district special election was held on September 23, 2025, in which Adelita Grijalva, his daughter, was elected to serve the remainder of his term.

== Early life, education and career ==
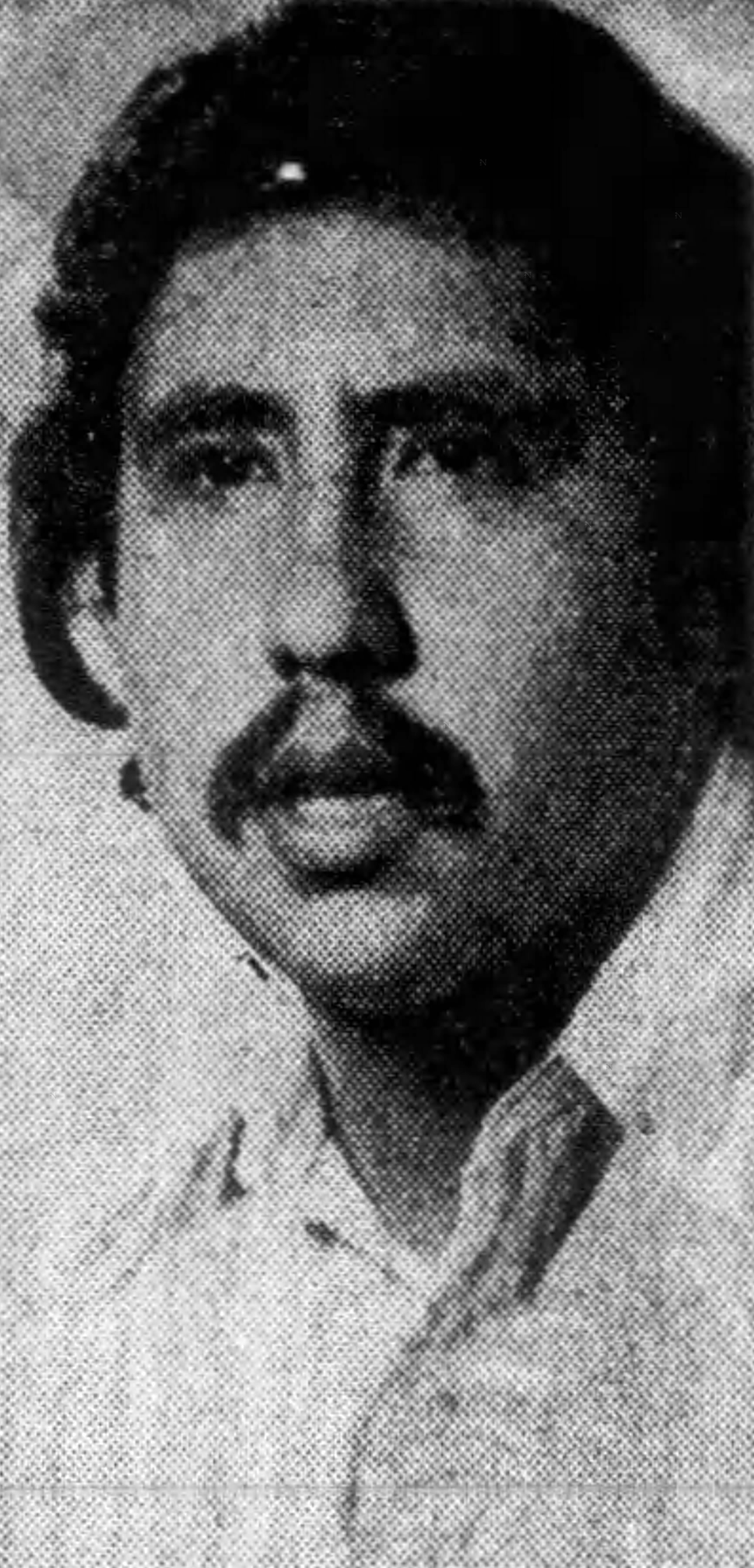
Grijalva as a candidate for Tucson School Board District 1, 1972

Grijalva was born on February 19, 1948, in Canoa Ranch, 30 mi (50 km) south of Tucson, the son of Rafaela and Raúl Grijalva. His father was a migrant worker from Mexico who entered the United States in 1945 through the Bracero Program and labored on southern Arizona ranches. He graduated from Sunnyside High School in 1967 and was a 2004 inductee to the Sunnyside High School Alumni Hall of Fame. He attended the University of Arizona and earned a bachelor's degree in sociology.

Grijalva was an Arizona leader of the Raza Unida Party. According to Armando Navarro's history of the party, "Grijalva was so militant that he alienated some members of Tucson's Mexican-American community. After losing his first bid for elective office, a 1972 run for a seat on the school board, he began cultivating a less radical image."

In 1974, Grijalva was elected to the Tucson Unified School District board and served until 1986. Grijalva Elementary School in Tucson was named for him in 1987. From 1975 to 1986, Grijalva was the director of the El Pueblo Neighborhood Center, and in 1987, he was Assistant Dean for Hispanic Student Affairs at the University of Arizona. Grijalva was a member of the Pima County Board of Supervisors from the 5th district from January 1, 1989 to February 6, 2002 and served as chair from 2000 to 2002. He resigned as a supervisor in 2002 to run for Congress.

== U.S. House of Representatives ==
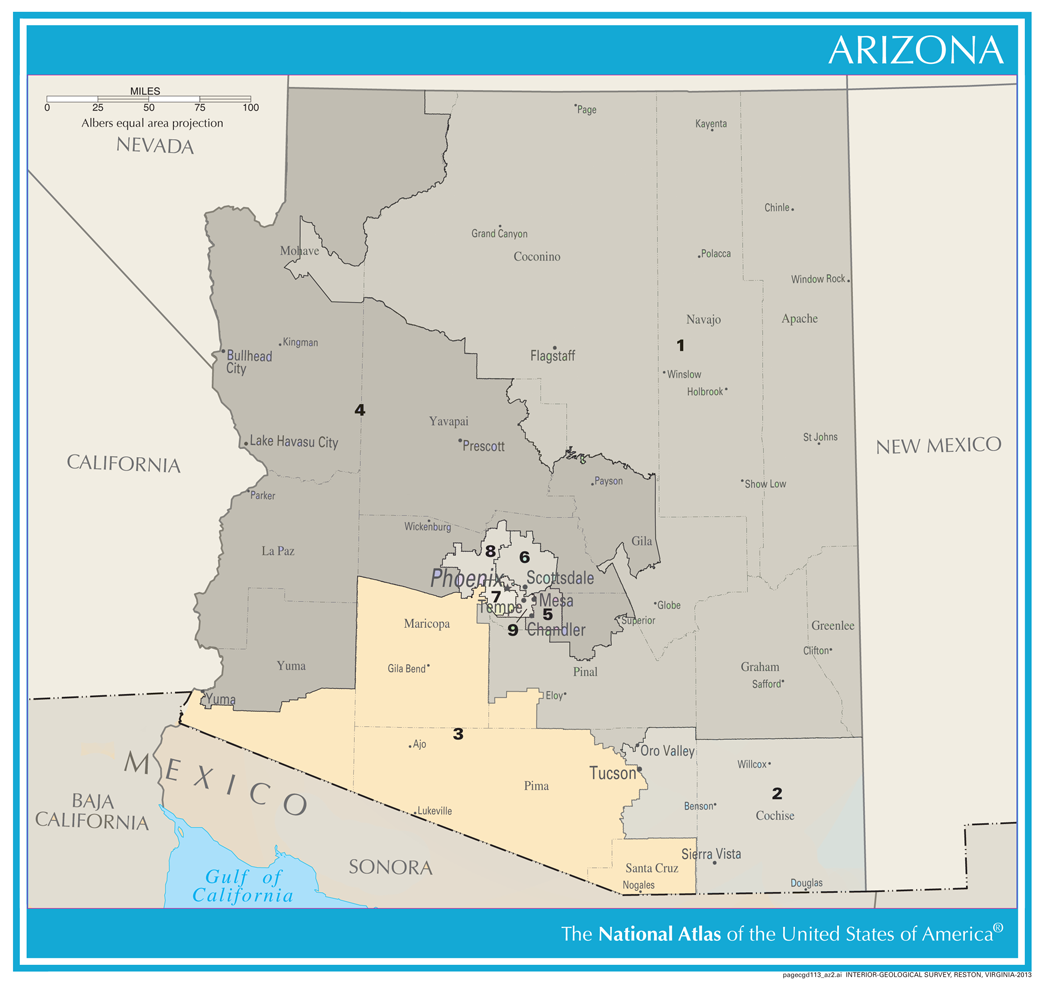
Arizona's 3rd congressional district, which Grijalva represented from 2013 to 2023

=== Tenure ===
==== 108th Congress (2003–2005) ====
Grijalva was elected as a Democrat to the 108th Congress in 2002, representing Arizona's seventh congressional district. As a freshman congressman, the first bill he sponsored was H.R. 731, the Tohono O'odham Citizenship Act of 2003. Although the bill was not passed into law, it sought to grant American citizenship to all members of the Tohono Oʼodham. This federally recognized tribe has land that stretches from their reservation in Arizona across the U.S.–Mexico border into the Mexican state of Sonora, resulting in some of its members not being U.S. citizens.

==== 114th Congress (2015–2017) ====
In 2015, Grijalva settled a complaint accusing him of drunkenness and a "hostile workplace environment" with a female staffer who had been at her job for three months. The $48,000 payment was made from House of Representatives funds.

==== 116th Congress (2019–2021) ====
For his tenure as the chair of the House Natural Resources Committee in the 116th Congress, Grijalva earned an "A" grade from the nonpartisan Lugar Center's Congressional Oversight Hearing Index.

In 2019, Grijalva was the subject of an Ethics Committee probe relating to his alcoholism and creating a "hostile workplace." He repeatedly came under fire for alcohol use, but denied alcoholism.

==== 117th Congress (2021–2023) ====
Grijalva was at the U.S. Capitol on January 6, 2021, to certify the 2020 presidential electoral college votes when the Capitol was attacked by Donald Trump supporters. Moments after Grijalva finished speaking in support of certifying Arizona's votes, rioters started banging on the doors of the House chambers. He called the attack "one of the darkest and most shameful days of our republic" and the perpetrators "domestic terrorists." Grijalva blamed President Donald Trump for inciting the attack and called for the 25th Amendment to be invoked to remove Trump from office. After the 25th Amendment was not invoked, Grijalva supported impeaching Trump a second time. He voted to impeach Trump again on January 13, 2021.

In February, Grijalva voted in support of the American Rescue Plan, which included a nationwide $15 federal minimum wage increase. However, the Senate Parliamentarian removed the increase from the bill. As a result, Grijalva joined a group of progressive Democrats in calling to overturn the Parliamentarian's ruling.

Grijalva voted with President Joe Biden's stated position 100% of the time in the 117th Congress, according to a FiveThirtyEight analysis.

==== 118th Congress (2023–2025) ====
During the 118th Congress, Grijalva returned to serve as the ranking member of the House Natural Resources Committee.

==== 119th Congress (2025) ====
Only three months into his 12th term in Congress, Grijalva died after battling lung cancer. He was succeeded by his daughter, Adelita Grijalva in a special election later that year to serve out the remainder of his term.

=== Committee assignments ===
For the 118th Congress:

- Committee on Education and the Workforce
  - Subcommittee on Early Childhood, Elementary, and Secondary Education
  - Subcommittee on Higher Education and Workforce Development
- Committee on Natural Resources (Ranking Member)
  - In addition to the below, Rep. Grijalva was entitled to sit as an ex officio member in all subcommittee meetings per the committee rules.
  - Subcommittee on Energy and Mineral Resources

=== Caucus memberships ===
Grijalva was a member of several dozen caucuses. A full list is available at his website.

- Congressional Progressive Caucus
- Congressional Hispanic Caucus
- Congressional Equality Caucus
- Congressional Arts Caucus
- Congressional NextGen 9-1-1 Caucus
- Congressional Voting Rights Caucus
- Congressional Wildlife Refuge Caucus
- Blue Collar Caucus
- House Pro-Choice Caucus
- Congressional Coalition on Adoption
- Rare Disease Caucus

== Political positions ==
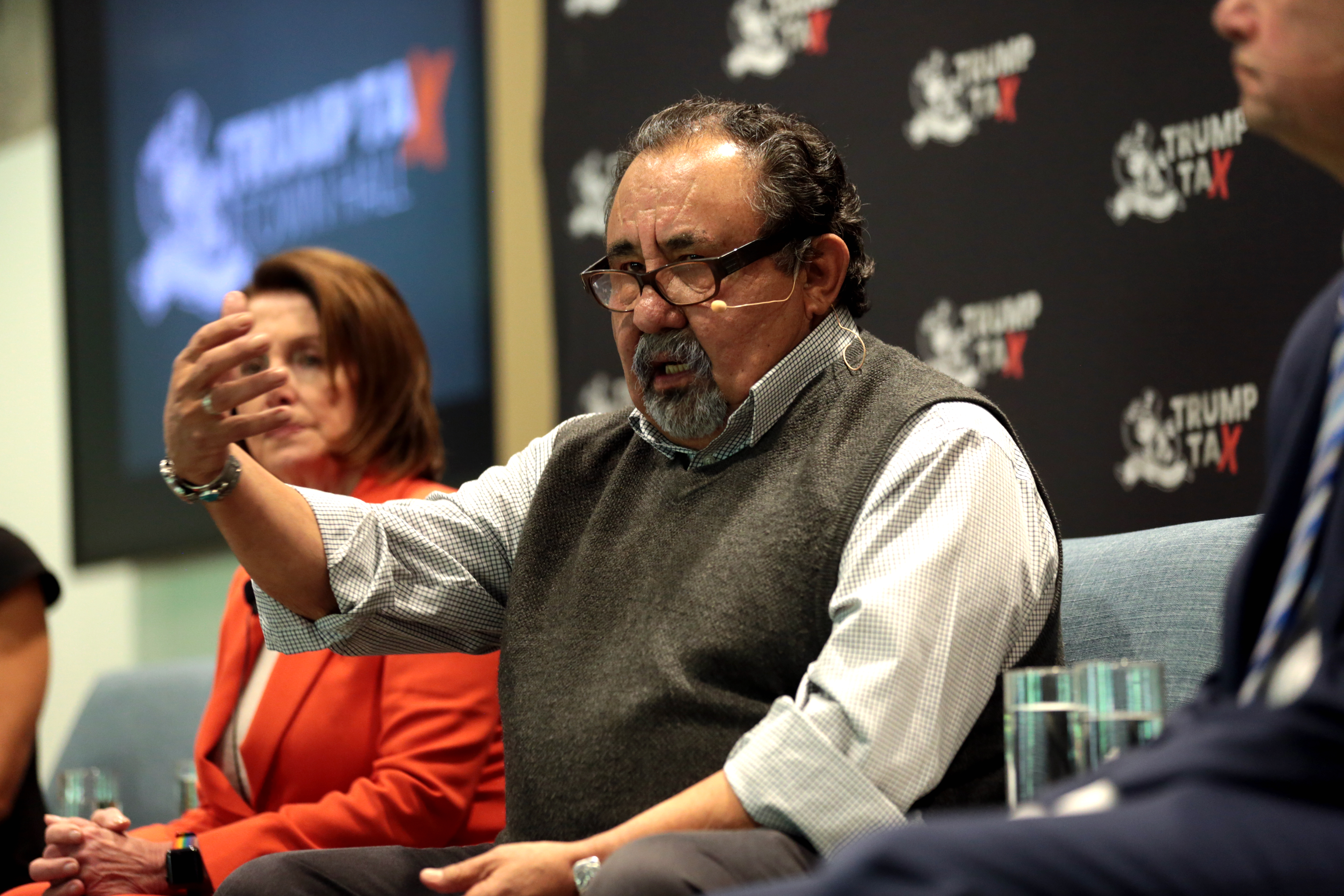
Grijalva speaking at a tax policy event in Phoenix, Arizona, February 2018

Grijalva formerly co-chaired the Congressional Progressive Caucus with Mark Pocan, having been replaced by Pramila Jayapal after stepping down in order to chair the House Committee on Natural Resources. In 2008, he was among 12 members rated by National Journal as tied for most liberal overall. On the ideological map of all House members at GovTrack's website, Grijalva had been ranked furthest to the left. Liberal and progressive activist groups routinely gave him high marks for his voting record. Grijalva received a 100% score from Americans for Democratic Action, Peace Action, the League of Conservation Voters, the Leadership Conference on Civil and Human Rights, NARAL Pro-Choice America, Arab American Institute, and several other notable groups. At the start of the 114th Congress, Grijalva became the ranking member of the House Committee on Natural Resources. As of 2023, the AFL-CIO labor union federation gave Grijalva a 100% score, with a lifetime score of 99%.

Grijalva was an advocate of mining law reform and many other environmental causes. From his position on the House Committee on Natural Resources—where he had been the top Democrat on the Subcommittee on National Parks, Forests and Public Lands since 2007—he had led Democratic efforts to strengthen federal offshore oil drilling oversight since before the 2010 Deepwater Horizon oil spill and introduced a successful bill to create a permanent National Landscape Conservation System at the Bureau of Land Management. He was a leading candidate for Secretary of the Interior when President Barack Obama was elected, but the job eventually went to Ken Salazar; according to The Washington Post, Obama made the decision in part because of Grijalva's stated preference for more environmental analysis before approving offshore drilling projects.

Grijalva was a vocal opponent of Arizona's SB 1070 law, which mandates police checks of citizenship documentation for anyone subjected to a legitimate law enforcement stop, detention or arrest as long as the officer does not consider race, color or national origin during the stop, detention or arrest. Shortly after Arizona governor Jan Brewer signed the measure, Grijalva called on legal, political, activist and business groups not to hold their conventions or conferences in Arizona, a position he said quickly became misconstrued as a call for a general boycott of Arizona's economy. In response, the Arizona Republican Party handed out bumper stickers reading "Boycott Grijalva, Not Arizona". After a federal judge stopped implementation of most of SB 1070, Grijalva withdrew the boycott, saying that he had reacted to it "very personally". In an interview, he said, "to all of a sudden have a law that separates me from the whole I found very offensive and demeaning."

Grijalva criticized the 2010 deployment of 1,200 National Guard troops to the U.S.–Mexico border as "political symbolism" that he believed would not adequately address the issues of immigration and border security.

Grijalva often called for a withdrawal of troops from Afghanistan and Iraq, and supported the wider implementation of the National Solidarity Program as a way to improve Afghans' economic and educational infrastructure. The group Iraq and Afghanistan Veterans of America gave him an "A" rating for the 2007–08 congressional session and a "C" for 2009–10.

=== Abortion ===
Grijalva had a pro-choice voting record and voted against the Partial-Birth Abortion Ban Act. He was strongly critical of the Stupak-Pitts Amendment, which sought to place limits on taxpayer-funded abortions in the Affordable Health Care for America Act. Grijalva opposed the 2022 overturning of Roe v. Wade, calling it "about control" and "mostly men forcing women to carry a child against their will. It is about trapping women in our society in cycles of poverty, so that they cannot easily rise to challenge these men who fear their success."

=== Budget proposals ===
As co-chair of the Congressional Progressive Caucus, Grijalva took a leading role in shaping CPC "alternative budgets"—budget bills offered by various groups and caucuses in Congress other than the official majority or minority party plan. In 2011 the CPC introduced what it called the People's Budget, which reached budget balance in 10 years according to an assessment by the Economic Policy Institute based on nonpartisan government data. The proposal was noted approvingly by some of the world's leading economists, including Jeffrey Sachs—who called it "a bolt of hope ... humane, responsible, and most of all sensible"—and Paul Krugman, who called it "genuinely courageous" for achieving budget balance "without dismantling the legacy of the New Deal".

In 2012, again with Grijalva as co-chair, the Progressive Caucus introduced the Budget for All, which is similar to the People's Budget and includes several new features, including a novel proposal to institute a small personal wealth tax above $10 million in net worth phased in over a period of five years. The proposal received 78 votes, all from Democrats, when the House considered it on March 29, 2012.

Grijalva was among the 46 Democrats who voted against final passage of the Fiscal Responsibility Act of 2023 in the House.

=== Deepwater Horizon and oil rig safety ===
On February 24, 2010, Grijalva wrote a letter signed by 18 other representatives calling for an investigation of the BP Atlantis offshore drilling platform due to whistleblower allegations that it was operating without approved safety documents. He called for Atlantis to be shut down. After the Deepwater Horizon oil spill on April 20, 2010, Grijalva wrote letters to the Minerals Management Service and the Department of the Interior questioning current offshore drilling regulations and calling for stronger oversight of the oil industry.

Grijalva gained prominence as an outspoken critic of what he calls lax federal oversight of the oil drilling industry, and in late 2010 launched an investigation of the White House's handling of the Horizon spill and its aftermath. That investigation revealed that scientists at the Environmental Protection Agency and elsewhere in the federal government had voiced concerns about drafts of an official government report on the cause and scope of the spill, but were overruled because the report was meant as a "communications document".

In 2010, Grijalva introduced H.R. 5355 to eliminate the cap on oil company liability for the cost of environmental cleanups of spills.

=== Education ===
Grijalva sponsored numerous education bills, including the Success in the Middle Act and the Graduation for All Act. Grijalva served as an elected member of the Tucson Unified School District Governing Board from 1974 to 1986, and served as its chairman for six years. During his time in the school board, Grijalva pushed for improvements to bilingual education programs. During the 118th Congress, Grijalva was a member of the Committee on Education and Workforce, as well as the subcommittees on early childhood education and higher education.

=== Environment ===
As a member and chair of the Pima County Board of Supervisors, Grijalva was widely regarded as a central figure behind the Sonoran Desert Conservation Plan, an ambitious county program for planned land-use and biodiversity conservation. He consistently supported endangered species and wilderness conservation on the Board of Supervisors and continued to do so in Congress, introducing a bill in 2009 to make permanent the National Landscape Conservation System within the Bureau of Land Management. In 2008, Grijalva released a report, The Bush Administration's Assaults on Our National Parks, Forests and Public Lands, that accused the Bush administration of mismanaging public land and reducing barriers to commercial access.

The Trump administration proposed changes to "the way it enforces the Endangered Species Act" in 2018. Among other things, the proposal would facilitate delisting endangered species and "streamline interagency consultations". A ranking member of the House Natural Resources Committee at the time, Grijalva called the proposal "a favor to industry" and said the administration "doesn't seem to know any other way to handle the environment" than "as an obstacle to industry profits".

=== Foreign policy ===
In 2011, Grijalva and representatives Barbara Lee, Mike Honda, and Lynn Woolsey criticized Obama for failing to seek congressional authorization for military intervention in Libya, and was one of the 70 Democrats to vote to defund the Libyan war. In 2013, he opposed intervening in Syria.

On April 25, 2018, 57 U.S. representatives, including Grijalva, released a condemnation of Holocaust distortion in Poland and Ukraine. They criticized Poland's new Holocaust law, which would criminalize accusing Poland of complicity in the Holocaust, and Ukraine's 2015 memory laws glorifying the Ukrainian Insurgent Army (UPA) and its leaders, such as Roman Shukhevych.

In July 2019, Grijalva voted against a House resolution condemning the Global Boycott, Divestment, and Sanctions Movement targeting Israel. The resolution passed 398–17.

In 2021, Grijalva was one of eight Democrats to vote against the funding of the Iron Dome in Israel. Grijalva voted to support Israel following the October 7 attacks.

=== Fossil fuel industry funding of climate change studies ===
On February 24, 2015, as the ranking Democratic member of the United States House Committee on Natural Resources, Grijalva sent letters to seven institutions employing scientists who disagree with most other climate scientists on manmade climate change. The letters requested information on any funding from fossil fuel companies as well as copies of all emails about the content of their congressional testimony. One of the recipients, University of Colorado professor Roger Pielke Jr., responded that he had already testified to Grijalva's committee that he has received no funding from fossil fuel interests, and characterized the letter as part of a politically motivated "witch-hunt".

The heads of some mainstream scientific organizations criticized Grijalva's letters. Margaret Leinen, the president of the American Geophysical Union, posted on her AGU blog that in requiring information of only a few scientists, based only on their scientific views, Grivalja's action was contrary to academic freedom: "We view the singling out of any individual or group of scientists by any entity – governmental, corporate or other – based solely on their interpretations of scientific research as a threat to that freedom." The executive director of the American Meteorological Society wrote to Grijalva that his action "sends a chilling message to all academic researchers" and "impinges on the free pursuit of ideas that is central to the concept of academic freedom". In response to criticism that requesting communications was counter to principles of academic freedom, Grijalva said he was willing to eliminate that part of the request.

=== Gun control ===
Grijalva supported increasing restrictions on the purchase and possession of guns and increasing enforcement of existing restrictions on gun purchase and possession. He was one of the 67 co-sponsors of the 2007 Assault Weapons Ban, HR 1022. Grijalva had an F rating from the NRA Political Victory Fund.

=== Health care ===
As co-chair of the Progressive Caucus, Grijalva was a prominent supporter of a public option throughout the debate over the Patient Protection and Affordable Care Act. The House-approved Affordable Health Care for America Act included a public option, but the Senate version did not, and it was ultimately not a part of the final package. Grijalva was largely supportive of the ACA from its passage and argued the Supreme Court should not overturn it during a segment with Representative Peter Roskam, who opposed the law, on the PBS NewsHour on March 28, 2012.

Grijalva had a long history in community health activism as an early supporter of Tucson's El Rio Community Health Center. He supported single-payer health care, but voted for the ACA because he felt it was a major improvement over the status quo.

=== Immigration ===
Grijalva supported the DREAM Act and the Comprehensive Immigration Reform for America's Security and Prosperity Act of 2009 ("CIR ASAP") and had come to prominence because of his role in promoting immigration reform. He opposed the expansion of a border fence, citing cost effectiveness concerns and potential damage to sensitive wildlife habitats. In 2013, Grijalva reintroduced the CIR ASAP bill in the 113th Congress, but the bill did not receive a floor vote.

During the 109th United States Congress, Grijalva voted against H.R. 4437 and the Secure Fence Act. Grijalva opposed Arizona Proposition 200 in 2004.

Grijalva criticized armed civilian groups that patrol the Mexican border, accusing them of racism, and reportedly used demeaning language to describe them. In return, some supporters of the armed patrols have called him "MEChA boy" in retaliation.

=== Native Americans ===
When elected in 2002, Grijalva's seventh Congressional district included seven sovereign Native American tribes: the Tohono O’odham Nation, Pascua Yaqui Tribe, Gila River Indian Community, Ak-Chin Indian Community, Cocopah Tribe, Colorado River Indian Tribes and the Quechan Tribe. After the redistricting based on the 2020 census, the seventh district includes the Tohono O’odham Nation, Pascua Yaqui Tribe, Cocopah Tribe, and Quechan Tribe. Grijalva supported the sovereignty of Native American governments and advocates for a strong government-to-government relationship between Tribal Nations and the United States. He believed that Tribal Nations should receive the respect and authority they deserve in managing their lands and protecting their sacred and cultural sites.

In April 2010, Grijalva introduced the "Requirements, Expectations, and Standard Procedures in Effective Consultation with Tribes Act," known as the RESPECT Act, which ultimately did not pass into law. The bill aimed to establish into law a Clinton-era executive order that lacked the force of law. It would require the federal government to consult with tribal governments before initiating any proposed federal activities or finalizing regulatory actions that could impact tribal communities. Additionally, the Act mandated consultations for all activities that may affect federal land adjacent to Indian land.

=== SB 1070 and the boycott controversy ===
After the passage in April 2010 of Arizona's controversial SB 1070 law, which Grijalva saw as opening the door to racial profiling and granting traditionally federal immigration enforcement powers to local authorities, he suggested that civic, religious, labor, Latino, and other like-minded organizations refrain from using Arizona as a convention site until the law was repealed. His opposition to SB 1070 and his suggestion of a boycott of Arizona were widely viewed as the reason for multiple subsequent death threats against him and his staff, which led to several office closures in 2010.

When Judge Susan Ritchie Bolton of the Arizona District Court enjoined major parts of the law in July 2010, Grijalva ended his call for economic sanctions. As he told the Arizona Daily Star, the largest paper in Tucson:

After this ruling, everybody has some responsibility to pause, and that includes me ... The issue of economic sanctions is a moot point now and I will encourage national organizations I'm in contact with to come and lend a hand—not just economically, but to help us begin to educate people about how we need to fix this broken system.

He subsequently said that his economic strategy was not as effective as he hoped in changing other state lawmakers' minds, and that he would focus on legal remedies in the future.

=== Presidential election objections ===
Concerned about allegations of voting irregularities purportedly leading to disenfranchisement in the 2004 United States presidential election between incumbent Republican George W. Bush and Democratic candidate John Kerry, Grijalva joined Representative Eddie Bernice Johnson and several other House Democrats in requesting that the United Nations observe and certify elections in the United States. After the 2004 general election, Grijalva was one of 31 representatives to vote not to count Ohio's electoral votes. President George W. Bush won Ohio by 118,457 votes.

Grijalva objected to North Carolina's electoral votes in the 2016 presidential election, which Donald Trump won by over 150,000 votes. Because no senator joined his objection, it was dismissed.

=== Giffords shooting ===
After the shooting of Gabby Giffords, Grijalva called it a consequence of the violent rhetoric that had been used by Tea Party members. He singled out Sarah Palin's rhetoric as "contributing to this toxic climate" and said she needed to monitor her words and actions.

=== Puerto Rico statehood ===
In June 2023, Raul Grijalva traveled to Puerto Rico to discuss the prospects for statehood and energy issues in Puerto Rico with Governor of Puerto Rico Pedro Pierluisi. In 2022, as chairman of the Natural Resources Committee, Grijalva shepherded the Puerto Rico Status Act to final passage in the House of Representatives.

== Political campaigns ==
During the 2008 Democratic Party presidential primaries, Grijalva initially supported former senator from North Carolina John Edwards, but later switched to supporting Barack Obama's campaign.

During the 2016 primaries, Grijalva – then the co-chair of the Congressional Progressive Caucus – broke from many of his colleagues and announced his support for Democratic presidential candidate Bernie Sanders on October 9, 2015, at Sanders campaign rally in Tucson.

On July 3, 2024, Grijalva became the second House Democrat to publicly call for Joe Biden to withdraw from the 2024 United States presidential election.

== Electoral history ==
Raúl Grijalva electoral history

2002 Arizona 7th congressional district election
Primary election
Party	Candidate	Votes	%
Democratic	Raúl Grijalva	14,835	40.85
Democratic	Elaine Richardson	7,589	20.89
Democratic	Jaime P. Gutierrez	5,401	14.87
Democratic	Lisa Otondo	2,302	6.34
Democratic	Luis Armando Gonzales	2,105	5.80
Democratic	Mark Fleisher	2,022	5.57
Democratic	Sherry Smith	1,058	2.91
Democratic	Jésus Romo	1,008	2.78
Total votes		36,320	100.00
General election
Democratic	Raúl Grijalva	61,256	59.00
Republican	Ross Hieb	38,474	37.06
Libertarian	John L. Nemeth	4,088	3.94
Total votes		103,818	100.00
Democratic win (new seat)			

2004 Arizona 7th congressional district election
Primary election
Party	Candidate	Votes	%
Democratic	Raúl Grijalva (incumbent)	26,450	100.00
Total votes		26,450	100.00
General election
Democratic	Raúl Grijalva (incumbent)	108,868	62.06
Republican	Joseph Sweeney	59,066	33.67
Libertarian	Dave Kaplan	7,503	4.28
Total votes		175,437	100.00
Democratic hold			

2006 Arizona 7th congressional district election
Primary election
Party	Candidate	Votes	%
Democratic	Raúl Grijalva (incumbent)	26,604	100.00
Total votes		26,604	100.00
General election
Democratic	Raúl Grijalva (incumbent)	80,354	61.09
Republican	Ron Drake	46,498	35.35
Libertarian	Joe Cobb	4,673	3.55
Total votes		131,525	100.00
Democratic hold			

2008 Arizona 7th congressional district election
Primary election
Party	Candidate	Votes	%
Democratic	Raúl Grijalva (incumbent)	30,630	100.00
Total votes		30,630	100.00
General election
Democratic	Raúl Grijalva (incumbent)	124,304	63.26
Republican	Ron Drake	64,425	32.79
Libertarian	Joe Cobb	7,755	3.95
Independent	Harley Meyer (write-in)	5	0.00
Total votes		196,489	100.00
Democratic hold			

2010 Arizona 7th congressional district election
Primary election
Party	Candidate	Votes	%
Democratic	Raúl Grijalva (incumbent)	33,931	100.00
Total votes		33,931	100.00
General election
Democratic	Raúl Grijalva (incumbent)	79,935	50.23
Republican	Ruth McClung	70,385	44.23
Independent	Harley Meyer	4,506	2.83
Libertarian	George Keane	4,318	2.71
Total votes		159,144	100.00
Democratic hold			

2012 Arizona 3rd congressional district election
Primary election
Party	Candidate	Votes	%
Democratic	Raúl Grijalva (incumbent)	24,044	65.63
Democratic	Amanda Aguirre	9,484	25.89
Democratic	Manny Arreguin	3,105	8.48
Total votes		36,633	100.00
General election
Democratic	Raúl Grijalva (incumbent)	98,468	58.37
Republican	Gabriela Saucedo Mercer	62,663	37.15
Libertarian	Blanca Guerra	7,567	4.49
Total votes		168,698	100.00
Democratic hold			

2014 Arizona 3rd congressional district election
Primary election
Party	Candidate	Votes	%
Democratic	Raúl Grijalva (incumbent)	28,758	100.00
Total votes		28,758	100.00
General election
Democratic	Raúl Grijalva (incumbent)	58,192	55.72
Republican	Ron Drake	46,185	44.23
Independent	F. Sanchez (write-in)	43	0.04
Independent	Lee Thompson (write-in)	8	0.01
Total votes		104,428	100.00
Democratic hold			

2016 Arizona 3rd congressional district election
Primary election
Party	Candidate	Votes	%
Democratic	Raúl Grijalva (incumbent)	35,844	100.00
Total votes		35,844	100.00
General election
Democratic	Raúl Grijalva (incumbent)	148,973	98.63
Independent	Bill Abatecola (write-in)	1,303	0.86
Independent	Jaime Vasquez (write-in)	332	0.22
Independent	Harvey Martin (write-in)	283	0.19
Independent	Federico A. Sanchez (write-in)	144	0.10
Total votes		151,035	100.00
Democratic hold			

2018 Arizona 3rd congressional district election
Primary election
Party	Candidate	Votes	%
Democratic	Raúl Grijalva (incumbent)	45,186	99.82
Democratic	Joshua Garcia (write-in)	81	0.18
Total votes		45,267	100.00
General election
Democratic	Raúl Grijalva (incumbent)	114,650	63.87
Republican	Nick Pierson	64,868	36.13
Total votes		179,518	100.00
Democratic hold			

2020 Arizona 3rd congressional district election
Primary election
Party	Candidate	Votes	%
Democratic	Raúl Grijalva (incumbent)	63,290	100.00
Total votes		63,290	100.00
General election
Democratic	Raúl Grijalva (incumbent)	174,243	64.57
Republican	Daniel Wood	95,594	35.43
Total votes		269,837	100.00
Democratic hold			

2022 Arizona 7th congressional district election
Primary election
Party	Candidate	Votes	%
Democratic	Raúl Grijalva (incumbent)	62,547	100.00
Total votes		62,547	100.00
General election
Democratic	Raúl Grijalva (incumbent)	126,418	64.54
Republican	Luis Pozzolo	69,444	35.46
Total votes		195,862	100.00
Democratic hold			

2024 Arizona 7th congressional district election
Primary election
Party	Candidate	Votes	%
Democratic	Raúl Grijalva (incumbent)	55,133	100.00
Total votes		55,133	100.00
General election
Democratic	Raúl Grijalva (incumbent)	171,954	63.45
Republican	Daniel Francis Butierez Sr.	99,057	36.55
Total votes		271,011	100.00
Democratic hold			

Table of Results 2002–2024: Arizona's 7th congressional district (2002–10, 2022–24); 3rd congressional district (2012–2020)
Year	Democratic	Votes	Pct	Republican	Votes	Pct	3rd party	Party	Votes	Pct	3rd party	Party	Votes	Pct
2002	Raúl Grijalva	61,256	59.0%	Ross Hieb	38,474	37.1%	John L. Nemeth	Libertarian	4,088	3.9%				
2004	Raúl Grijalva (incumbent)	108,868	62.1%	Joseph Sweeney	59,066	33.7%	Dave Kaplan	Libertarian	7,503	4.3%				
2006	Raúl Grijalva (incumbent)	80,354	61.1%	Ron Drake	46,498	35.4%	Joe Michael Cobb	Libertarian	4,673	3.6%				
2008	Raúl Grijalva (incumbent)	124,304	63.3%	Joseph Sweeney	64,425	32.8%	Raymond Patrick Petrulsky	Libertarian	7,755	4.0%	Harley Meyer	Write-in	5	0.0%
2010	Raúl Grijalva (incumbent)	79,935	50.2%	Ruth McClung	70,385	44.2%	Harley Meyer	Independent	4,506	2.8%	George Keane	Libertarian	4,318	2.7%
2012	Raúl Grijalva (incumbent)	98,468	58.4%	Gabriela Saucedo Mercer	62,663	37.1%	Bianca Guerra	Libertarian	7,567	4.5%				
2014	Raúl Grijalva (incumbent)	58,192	55.7%	Gabriela Saucedo Mercer	46,185	44.3%	F. Sanchez	Write-in	43	0.0%	Lee Thompson	Write-in	8	0.0%
2016	Raúl Grijalva (incumbent)	148,973	98.6%				Write-ins		2,062	1.4%				
2018	Raúl Grijalva (incumbent)	114,650	63.9%	Nicolas Pierson	64,868	36.1%								
2020	Raúl Grijalva (incumbent)	165,452	76.7%	Josh Barnett	50,226	23.3%								
2022	Raúl Grijalva (incumbent)	126,418	64.5%	Luis Pozzolo	69,444	35.5%								
2024	Raúl Grijalva (incumbent)	171,954	63.5%	Daniel Butierez	99,057	36.5%								

== Personal life and death ==
Grijalva and his wife, Ramona, had three daughters, including Pima County supervisor and former Tucson Unified School District board member and U.S. representative for Arizona's 7th congressional district Adelita Grijalva. Grijalva identified as Roman Catholic.

Grijalva was a hiker and a fan of the Arizona Wildcats men's basketball team.

On April 2, 2024, Grijalva announced that he had been diagnosed with unspecified cancer initially diagnosed as pneumonia (but which he later announced to be lung cancer), and was beginning a "vigorous course of treatment". Prior to his diagnosis, Grijalva was a heavy cigarette smoker. On March 13, 2025, Grijalva died in Tucson from complications of cancer treatment, at the age of 77.

Grijalva was cremated and his funeral mass was held at the Cathedral of Saint Augustine in Tucson. Speakers at his funeral who eulogized him included Governor Katie Hobbs and Representative Alexandria Ocasio Cortez.

His eldest daughter, Adelita Grijalva, won the election to succeed him.

== See also ==
- List of Hispanic and Latino Americans in the United States Congress
- List of members of the United States Congress who died in office (2000–present)

U.S. House of Representatives
New constituency	Member of the U.S. House of Representatives from Arizona's 7th congressional district 2003–2013	Succeeded by Ed Pastor
Preceded by Ben Quayle	Member of the U.S. House of Representatives from Arizona's 3rd congressional district 2013–2023	Succeeded by Ruben Gallego
Preceded by Peter DeFazio	Ranking Member of the House Natural Resources Committee; 2015–2019	Succeeded by Rob Bishop
Preceded by Rob Bishop	Chair of the House Natural Resources Committee; 2019–2023	Succeeded by Bruce Westerman
Preceded by Ruben Gallego	Member of the U.S. House of Representatives from Arizona's 7th congressional district 2023–2025	Succeeded by Adelita Grijalva
Preceded by Bruce Westerman	Ranking Member of the House Natural Resources Committee; 2023–2025	Succeeded by Jared Huffman
Party political offices
Preceded by Barbara Lee	Chair of the Congressional Progressive Caucus; 2009–2019; Served alongside: Lynn Woolsey, Keith Ellison, Mark Pocan	Succeeded by Pramila Jayapal
