= Public Law 113-127 =

2014 United States federal law

- Long title: To authorize the Secretary of the Interior to take certain Federal lands located in El Dorado County, California, into trust for the benefit of the Shingle Springs Band of Miwok Indians, and for other purposes.
- Announced in: the 113th United States Congress
- Sponsored by: Rep. Tom McClintock (R, CA-4)
- Number of co-sponsors: 0

Citations
- Public law: Pub. L. 113–127 (text) (PDF)

Codification
- U.S.C. sections affected: 25 U.S.C. § 2701 et seq.
- Agencies affected: United States Department of the Interior, Bureau of Land Management

Legislative history
- Introduced in the House as H.R. 2388 by Rep. Tom McClintock (R, CA-4) on June 14, 2013; Committee consideration by United States House Committee on Natural Resources, United States House Natural Resources Subcommittee on Public Lands and Environmental Regulation, United States House Natural Resources Subcommittee on Indian and Alaska Native Affairs, United States Senate Committee on Indian Affairs; Passed the House on December 3, 2013 (voice vote); Passed the Senate on June 26, 2014 (unanimous consent); Signed into law by President Barack Obama on July 16, 2014

Pub. L. 113–127 (text) (PDF) (H.R. 2388) is a United States public law that would take specified federal land in El Dorado County, California, into trust for the Shingle Springs Band of Miwok Indians. The United States Secretary of the Interior would be responsible for carrying this out.

The bill passed both the United States House of Representatives and the United States Senate during the 113th United States Congress. President Barack Obama signed into law on July 16, 2014, making it Pub. L. 113–127 (text) (PDF).

== Background ==
The United States Department of the Interior provided the following background information about the situation when it testified about the bill before the Subcommittee on Indian and Alaska Native Affairs of the House Natural Resources Committee: "On December 16, 1916, the Secretary of the Interior purchased the 160-acre Shingle Springs Rancheria east of Sacramento in El Dorado County, California at the request of the Sacramento-Verona Band of Miwok Indians. Today's members of the Shingle Springs Rancheria are descendants of the Miwok and Maidu Indians who once lived in this region. Currently, there are approximately 500 enrolled members of the Tribe, with about 140 living on the Rancheria.The tribe has expressed an interest in expanding the Rancheria by adding adjacent BLM-managed lands for improved access and additional residential housing for the tribe."

== Provisions of the bill ==
This summary is based largely on the summary provided by the Congressional Research Service, a public domain source.

H.R. 2388 would take specified federal land in El Dorado County, California, into trust for the Shingle Springs Band of Miwok Indians.

The bill would describe that land as the approximately 40.852 acres of federal land under the administrative jurisdiction of the Bureau of Land Management (BLM) identified as "Conveyance boundary" on the map titled "Shingle Springs Land Conveyance/Draft" and dated June 7, 2012, including improvements and appurtenances thereto.

The bill would prohibit class II and III gaming on such lands.

== Congressional Budget Office report ==
This summary is based largely on the summary provided by the Congressional Budget Office, as ordered reported by the Senate Committee on Indian Affairs on May 21, 2014. This is a public domain source.

H.R. 2388 would take about 40 acres of federal land in El Dorado County, California, into trust for the benefit of the Shingle Springs Band of Miwok Indians. Based on information provided by the United States Department of the Interior, the Congressional Budget Office (CBO) estimates that implementing H.R. 2388 would have no significant effect on the federal budget because the cost of administering the lands would not change significantly. Enacting H.R. 2388 would not affect direct spending or revenues; therefore, pay-as-you-go procedures do not apply.

H.R. 2388 contains no intergovernmental or private-sector mandates as defined in the Unfunded Mandates Reform Act.

On August 29, 2013, CBO transmitted a cost estimate for H.R. 2388 as ordered reported by the House Committee on Natural Resources on July 31, 2013. The two versions of the legislation are similar, and the CBO cost estimates are the same.

== Procedural history ==
H.R. 2388 was introduced into the United States House of Representatives on June 14, 2013 by Rep. Tom McClintock (R, CA-4). The bill was referred to the United States House Committee on Natural Resources, the United States House Natural Resources Subcommittee on Public Lands and Environmental Regulation, and the United States House Natural Resources Subcommittee on Indian and Alaska Native Affairs. The bill was reported (amended) alongside House Report 113-195. The House voted on December 3, 2013 to pass the bill in a voice vote.

The bill was received in the United States Senate on December 9, 2013 and referred to the United States Senate Committee on Indian Affairs. The Senate had a hearing about the bill on May 21, 2014. The Senate voted on June 26, 2014 to pass the bill by unanimous consent. President Barack Obama signed the bill into law on July 16, 2014.

== Debate and discussion ==
The Department of the Interior supported the bill.

== See also ==
- List of bills in the 113th United States Congress
- Native American gaming
- Impact of Native American gaming
- Indian Gaming Regulatory Act
