= United States House Natural Resources Subcommittee on Water, Wildlife and Fisheries =

Subcommittee of Committee on Natural Resources
- Active United States House of Representatives; 119th Congress

Leadership
- Chair: Harriet Hageman (R)
- Ranking Member: Val Hoyle (D)

Structure
- Seats: 26 (26 currently filled) 14/14 12/12
- Political parties: Majority (14): Republican (14); Minority (12): Democratic (12)

Meeting place
- 1522, Longworth House Office Building; Washington, D.C. 20515

Phone number
- (202)-225-8331

The United States House Natural Resources Subcommittee on Water, Wildlife and Fisheries is one of the five subcommittees within the House Natural Resources Committee. It was previously known as the Subcommittee on Water, Oceans and Wildlife.

== Jurisdiction ==
In accordance with Rule 6. of the Committee on Natural Resources, the Subcommittee on Water, Oceans, and Wildlife has the following jurisdiction:

1. All measures and matters concerning water resources planning conducted pursuant to the Water Resources Planning Act, water resource research and development programs, and saline water research and development.
2. Compacts relating to the use and apportionment of interstate waters, water rights, and major interbasin water or power movement programs.
3. All measures and matters pertaining to irrigation and reclamation projects and other water resources development and recycling programs, including policies and procedures.
4. Indian water rights and settlements.
5. Activities and programs of the Water Resources Division or its successor within the U.S. Geological Survey.
6. The Endangered Species Act.
7. Fisheries management and fisheries research generally, including the management of all commercial and recreational fisheries (including the reauthorization of the Magnuson Stevens Fishery Conservation and Management Act), interjurisdictional fisheries, international fisheries agreements, aquaculture, seafood safety, and fisheries promotion.
8. All matters pertaining to the protection of coastal and marine environments, estuarine protection, and coastal barriers.
9. Oceanography.
10. Ocean engineering, including materials, technology, and systems.
11. Marine sanctuaries.
12. U.N. Convention on the Law of the Sea.
13. All matters regarding Antarctica within the Committee’s jurisdiction.
14. Sea Grant programs and marine extension services.
15. Cooperative efforts to encourage, enhance and improve international programs for the protection of the environment and the conservation of natural resources otherwise within the jurisdiction of the Subcommittee.
16. Coastal zone management.
17. Wildlife resources, including research, restoration, and conservation.
18. Measures and matters related to the U.S. Fish and Wildlife Service, including ecological services, fish and aquatic conservation, international affairs, migratory birds, national wildlife refuge system, wildlife and sport fish restoration, and the Lacey Act.
19. General and continuing oversight and investigative authority over activities, policies, and programs within the jurisdiction of the Subcommittee.

== Members, 119th Congress ==
Majority	Minority
Harriet Hageman, Wyoming, Chair; Rob Wittman, Virginia; Tom McClintock, California; Amata Coleman Radewagen, American Samoa; Doug LaMalfa, California; Daniel Webster, Florida; Lauren Boebert, Colorado; Cliff Bentz, Oregon; Jen Kiggans, Virginia; Tim Walberg, Michigan; Mike Ezell, Mississippi, Vice Chair; Celeste Maloy, Utah; Addison McDowell, North Carolina; Jeff Crank, Colorado	Val Hoyle, Oregon, Ranking Member; Seth Magaziner, Rhode Island; Debbie Dingell, Michigan; Melanie Stansbury, New Mexico; Jared Golden, Maine; Dave Min, California; Sarah Elfreth, Maryland; Adam Gray, California; Luz Rivas, California; Darren Soto, Florida; Julia Brownley, California; Joe Neguse, Colorado
Ex officio
Bruce Westerman, Arkansas	Jared Huffman, California

== Historical membership rosters ==
=== 118th Congress ===
Majority	Minority
Cliff Bentz, Oregon, Chair; Jen Kiggans, Virginia, Vice Chair; Rob Wittman, Virginia; Tom McClintock, California; Garret Graves, Louisiana; Amata Coleman Radewagen, American Samoa; Doug LaMalfa, California; Daniel Webster, Florida; Jenniffer González-Colón, Puerto Rico; Jerry Carl, Alabama; Lauren Boebert, Colorado; Anna Paulina Luna, Florida; John Duarte, California; Harriet Hageman, Wyoming	Jared Huffman, California, Ranking Member; Grace Napolitano, California; Mike Levin, California; Mary Peltola, Alaska; Kevin Mullin, California; Val Hoyle, Oregon; Seth Magaziner, Rhode Island; Debbie Dingell, Michigan; Ruben Gallego, Arizona; Joe Neguse, Colorado; Katie Porter, California; Ed Case, Hawaii
Ex officio
Bruce Westerman, Arkansas	Raúl Grijalva, Arizona

=== 117th Congress ===
Majority	Minority
Jared Huffman, California, Chair; Grace Napolitano, California; Jim Costa, California; Mike Levin, California; Debbie Dingell, Michigan; Ed Case, Hawaii; Doris Matsui, California; Alan Lowenthal, California; Steve Cohen, Tennessee; Darren Soto, Florida; Raúl Grijalva, Arizona; Nydia Velázquez, New York; Melanie Stansbury, New Mexico (since June 15, 2021)	Cliff Bentz, Oregon, Ranking Member; Jerry Carl, Alabama, Vice Ranking Member; Don Young, Alaska (until March 18, 2022); Rob Wittman, Virginia; Tom McClintock, California; Garret Graves, Louisiana; Amata Coleman Radewagen, American Samoa; Daniel Webster, Florida; Jenniffer González, Puerto Rico; Russ Fulcher, Idaho; Lauren Boebert, Colorado
Ex officio
Raúl Grijalva, Arizona	Bruce Westerman, Arkansas

=== 116th Congress ===
Majority	Minority
Jared Huffman, California, Chair; Grace Napolitano, California; Jim Costa, California; Gregorio Sablan, Northern Mariana Islands; Nydia Velázquez, New York; Anthony Brown, Maryland; Ed Case, Hawaii; Alan Lowenthal, California; TJ Cox, California; Joe Neguse, Colorado; Mike Levin, California; Joe Cunningham, South Carolina	Tom McClintock, California, Ranking Member; Doug Lamborn, Colorado; Rob Wittman, Virginia; Garret Graves, Louisiana; Jody Hice, Georgia; Amata Coleman Radewagen, American Samoa; Daniel Webster, Florida; Mike Johnson, Louisiana; Jenniffer González, Puerto Rico; Russ Fulcher, Idaho; Jeff Van Drew (Note: Van Drew left the Democratic Party on December 19, 2019, to join Republicans.), New Jersey
Ex officio
Raúl Grijalva, Arizona	Rob Bishop, Utah

=== 115th Congress ===
Majority	Minority
Doug Lamborn, Colorado, Chairman; Rob Wittman, Virginia; Tom McClintock, California; Paul Gosar, Arizona; Doug LaMalfa, California; Jeff Denham, California; Garret Graves, Louisiana; Jody Hice, Georgia; Daniel Webster, Florida, Vice Chair; David Rouzer, North Carolina; Mike Johnson, Louisiana	Jared Huffman, California, Ranking Member; Grace Napolitano, California; Jim Costa, California; Don Beyer, Virginia; Nanette Barragán, California; Madeleine Bordallo, Guam; Gregorio Sablan, Northern Mariana Islands; Jimmy Gomez, California; Vacancy
Ex officio
Rob Bishop, Utah	Raúl Grijalva, Arizona
