= United States House Natural Resources Subcommittee on Oversight and Investigations =

Subcommittee of Committee on Natural Resources
- Active United States House of Representatives; 119th Congress

Leadership
- Chair: Paul Gosar (R)
- Ranking Member: Maxine Dexter (D)

Structure
- Seats: 9 (8 currently filled) 5/5 3/4
- Political parties: Majority (5): Republican (5); Minority (3): Democratic (3)

Meeting place
- 1330, Longworth House Office Building; Washington, D.C. 20515

Phone number
- (202)-225-0500

The United States House Natural Resources Subcommittee on Oversight and Investigations is one of the five subcommittees within the House Natural Resources Committee. It was established in 2015 by Chairman Rob Bishop of Utah.

The Subcommittee on Oversight and Investigations has primary and general oversight and investigative authority on all activities, policies and programs within the jurisdiction of the Committee.

== Members, 119th Congress ==
Majority	Minority
Paul Gosar, Arizona, Chair; Lauren Boebert, Colorado, Vice Chair; Mike Collins, Georgia; Mark Amodei, Nevada; Nick Begich III, Alaska	Maxine Dexter, Oregon, Ranking Member; Yassamin Ansari, Arizona; Pablo Hernández Rivera, Puerto Rico
Ex officio
Bruce Westerman, Arkansas	Jared Huffman, California

== Historical membership rosters ==
=== 115th Congress ===
Majority	Minority
Raúl Labrador, Idaho, Chairman; Louie Gohmert, Texas; Amata Coleman Radewagen, American Samoa; Jack Bergman, Michigan; Mike Johnson, Louisiana, Vice Chairman; Jenniffer Gonzalez, Puerto Rico	Donald McEachin, Virginia, Ranking Member; Ruben Gallego, Arizona; Jared Huffman, California; Darren Soto, Florida; Lacy Clay, Missouri
Ex officio
Rob Bishop, Utah	Raúl Grijalva, Arizona

=== 116th Congress ===
Majority	Minority
TJ Cox, California, Chair; Debbie Dingell, Michigan; Donald McEachin, Virginia; Michael San Nicolas, Guam; Vacancy	Louie Gohmert, Texas, Ranking member; Paul Gosar, Arizona; Mike Johnson, Louisiana; Jenniffer Gonzalez, Puerto Rico
Ex officio
Raúl Grijalva, Arizona	Rob Bishop, Utah

=== 117th Congress ===
Majority	Minority
Katie Porter, California, Chair; Nydia Velázquez, New York; Chuy Garcia, Illinois; Steve Cohen, Tennessee; Jared Huffman, California	Blake Moore, Utah, Ranking Member; Louie Gohmert, Texas; Jody Hice, Georgia
Ex officio
Raúl Grijalva, Arizona	Bruce Westerman, Arkansas

=== 118th Congress ===
Majority	Minority
Paul Gosar, Arizona, Chair; Mike Collins, Georgia, Vice Chair; Matt Rosendale, Montana; Wesley Hunt, Texas; Anna Paulina Luna, Florida	Melanie Stansbury, New Mexico, Ranking Member; Ed Case, Hawaii; Ruben Gallego, Arizona; Susie Lee, Nevada
Ex officio
Bruce Westerman, Arkansas	Raúl Grijalva, Arizona
