= Yassamin Ansari =

American politician (born 1992)

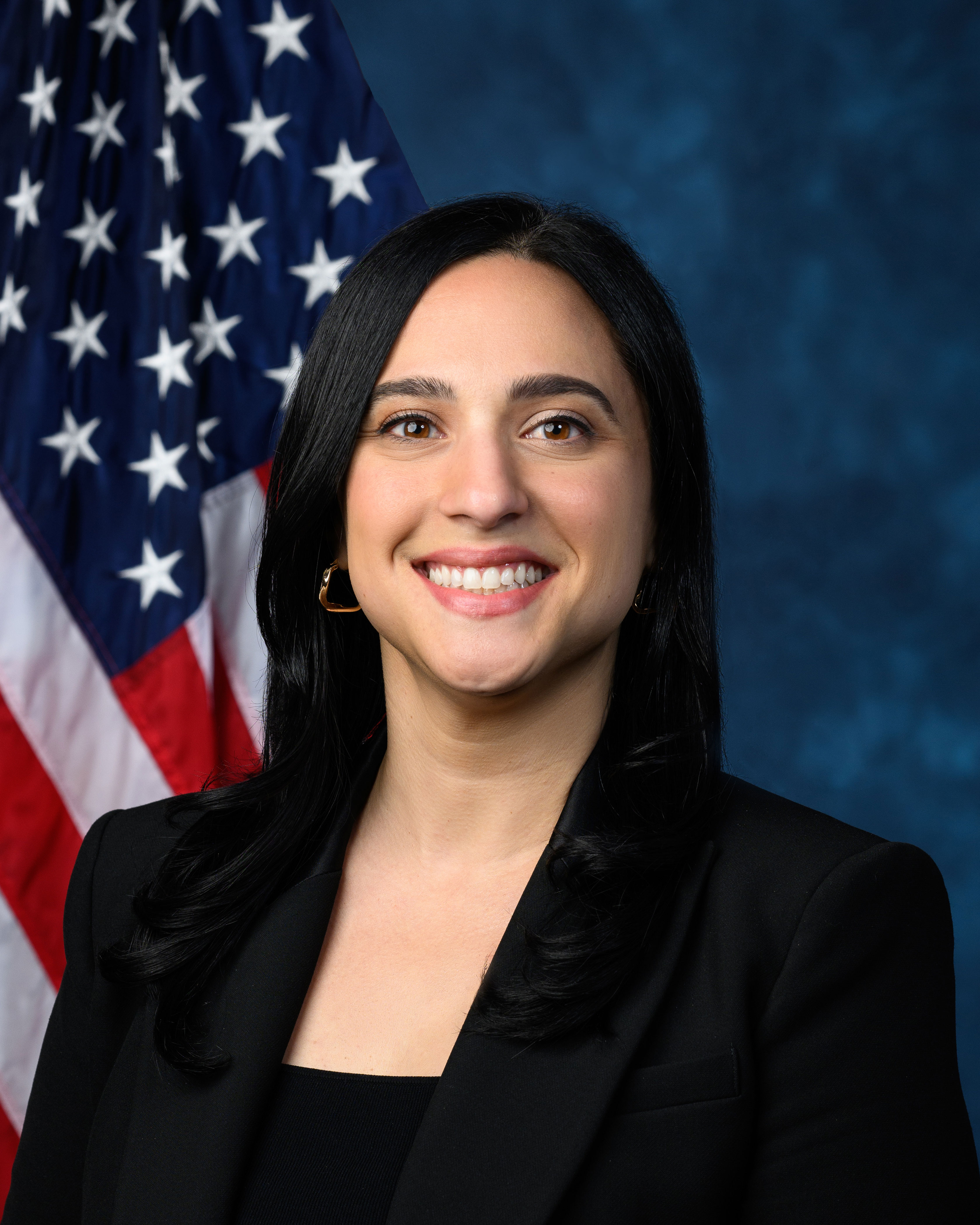
- Official portrait, 2025

Member of the U.S. House of Representatives from Arizona's 3rd district
- Incumbent
- Assumed office January 3, 2025
- Preceded by: Ruben Gallego

Member of the Phoenix City Council from the 7th district
- In office April 19, 2021 – March 28, 2024
- Preceded by: Michael Nowakowski
- Succeeded by: Carlos Galindo-Elvira

Personal details
- Born: April 7, 1992 (age 34) Seattle, Washington, U.S.
- Party: Democratic
- Education: Stanford University (BA); St. John's College, Cambridge (MPhil)
- Website: House website Campaign website

Yassamin Ansari (/ˈjɑːsəmɪn ænˈsɑːri/ YAH-sə-min an-SAH-ree, born April 7, 1992) is an American politician who serves as the U.S. representative for Arizona's 3rd congressional district since 2025. A progressive Democrat, she previously served on the Phoenix City Council from 2021 to 2024.

At the time of her election to the Phoenix City Council, Ansari was the youngest person to be elected to the council and the first Iranian American elected to public office in Arizona. In 2024, she was elected to the House to succeed Ruben Gallego, who was elected in the 2024 Senate election. Ansari is also the youngest female member of Congress. During her tenure, she has specialized on issues related to artificial intelligence, and favors a ban on superintelligence to prevent existential risks to humanity.

== Early life and education ==
Ansari was born in Seattle, Washington, to parents who immigrated to the United States after fleeing Iran following the Islamic Revolution. Ansari grew up in Scottsdale, Arizona and attended Chaparral High School. In high school, she organized with the Arizona Democratic Party in support of Barack Obama's 2008 presidential campaign and worked with her mother to tutor Somali refugees. Ansari attended Stanford University, and received a bachelor's degree in international relations. During college, Ansari interned for Nancy Pelosi.

== Early career ==
After graduation, she was selected for The John Gardner Fellowship Program and started working in the office of UN Secretary-General Ban Ki-moon. She worked as a senior policy advisor with Ban, spending a year working on the Paris Agreement, and later worked in the same role with Ban's successor, António Guterres. She started working towards a master's degree in international relations and politics from St. John's College, Cambridge in 2016 as a Gates Cambridge Scholar, which she ultimately received. She continued to be involved in promoting climate action, helping plan the Climate Action 2016 Summit, the Global Climate Action Summit, and the first U.N. Youth Climate Summit.

=== Phoenix City Council ===
Ansari ran in a November 2020 election to fill the seat vacated by Michael Nowakowski, representing Phoenix's 7th District. The top two of the five contenders in the general election, Ansari and Cinthia Estela, continued to a runoff election that took place on March 9, 2021. Ansari took office as a council member on April 19, 2021.

While in office, she created an Office of Heat Response and Mitigation. It has sought to plant trees, reduce pavement heat absorption, educate residents, and distribute resources including water. She helped develop a plan to promote use of electric vehicles, and advocated for the city to purchase hydrogen fuel cell and battery electric public buses. She attended the 2021 United Nations Climate Change Conference with Phoenix mayor Kate Gallego, as well as the 2022 United Nations Climate Change Conference.

Along with other Phoenix City Council members, Ansari was criticized in 2022 for using a suite at Footprint Center, a sports venue owned by the city, to watch games and concerts; following the criticism, the council voted to review its economic development efforts and consider leasing out the suite.

Ansari resigned her City Council seat on March 28, 2024, to focus on her congressional campaign. Former Hayden Mayor Carlos Galindo-Elvira was appointed to fill the remainder of her term.

== U.S. House of Representatives ==
=== Elections ===
==== 2024 ====
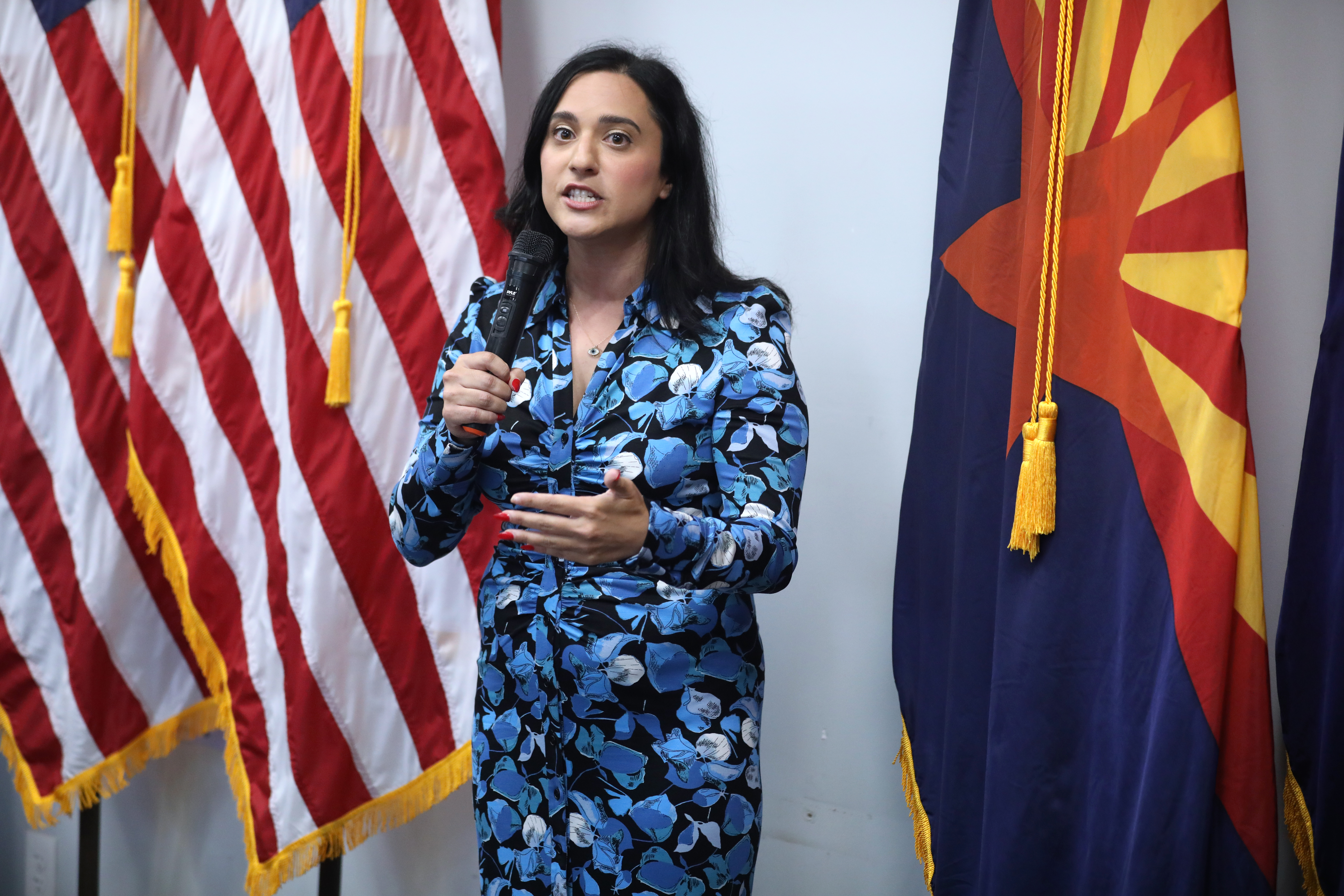
Ansari in 2024

Ansari had been considered a potential 2024 contender for Arizona's 3rd congressional district. She announced her candidacy for the seat on April 4, 2023, and led early fundraising in the race. In September 2023, Axios reported that Ansari and Raquel Terán would likely dominate the race. Ansari raised over $325,000 in the first quarter of 2024, bringing her total raised to more than $1.35 million. In August 2024, Ansari won the primary by 39 votes, and won the general election in the deep-blue district, winning nearly 71% of the vote.

=== Tenure ===
In November 2024, Ansari was elected the Democratic freshman class president. In April 2025, she joined a group of Democratic colleagues in the House in traveling to El Salvador to investigate the condition of Kilmar Abrego Garcia. Ansari appointed Sarah Ghermay to serve as her chief of staff.

==== Impeachment resolution against Pete Hegseth ====
On April 6, 2026, Ansari announced her intent to introduce articles of impeachment against Defense Secretary Pete Hegseth, citing the 2026 Iran war and repeated perceived violations of his oath of office and the Constitution. On April 15, she introduced a six-article resolution accusing Hegseth of waging an unauthorized war against Iran, violating the laws of armed conflict and targeting civilians, mishandling sensitive military information, obstructing congressional oversight, abusing power and politicizing the armed forces, and bringing discredit on the United States and its military. The resolution had 12 Democratic cosponsors, including Shri Thanedar.

=== Committee assignments ===
- Committee on Natural Resources
  - Subcommittee on Energy and Mineral Resources (Ranking Member)
  - Subcommittee on Oversight and Investigations
- Committee on Oversight and Government Reform
  - Subcommittee on Cybersecurity, Information Technology, and Government Innovation
  - Subcommittee on Economic Growth, Energy Policy, and Regulatory Affairs

=== Caucus memberships ===
- Congressional Asian Pacific American Caucus
- Congressional Progressive Caucus
- Congressional Labor Caucus
- Congressional Freethought Caucus

== Political positions ==
Ansari is a progressive Democrat.

=== Artificial intelligence ===
Ansari supports a ban on superintelligence. She believes that the rapid development of artificial intelligence is the world's most important issue, saying in November 2026 that: "Top of the Democratic agenda on day 1 needs to be a pause on advanced AI development, regulation of this out of control industry, and a ban on artificial superintelligence".

=== Climate change ===
Ansari has advocated for climate action and sustainability efforts.

=== Labor unions ===
Ansari supports labor unions.

=== LGBT ===
She supports LGBTQ rights.

=== Homelessness ===
In 2022, Ansari supported expanding temporary and affordable housing options to help address homelessness in Phoenix.

=== ICE ===
Following the killing of Alex Pretti by agents of the United States Custom and Border Patrol (CBP) in Minneapolis in January 2026, Ansari called for abolishing ICE.

=== Foreign policy ===
Ansari was endorsed by the pro-Israel lobby group Democratic Majority for Israel (DMFI), and supported continued U.S. military aid to Israel "without additional conditions" along with the expansion of the Abraham Accords during her 2024 election campaign. In November 2024, Ansari criticized a proposal by Senator Bernie Sanders that would block $20 billion in arm sales to Israel amid the Gaza war, saying, "this resolution will attempt to deprive Israel of the materials needed for deterrence and defense while also accomplishing nothing to improve the situation in Gaza."

In January 2025, Ansari was among a minority of House Democrats who voted for legislation rebuking and sanctioning the International Criminal Court (ICC) and its officials over arrest warrants issued against Israeli leaders. Ansari said that the ICC's actions were inappropriate and "as a liberal democracy with an independent judiciary, Israel has the responsibility of investigating allegations of wrongdoing".

In June 2025, Ansari expressed support for the now-defunct Iran nuclear deal and opposed U.S. military intervention in Iran. She condemned the 2026 Iran war, calling for an immediate end to the conflict in April 2026. In 2026, Ansari signed onto the Block the Bombs Act which intends to block the transfer and sale of offensive weaponry to Israel.

In July 2026, Ansari voted for an amendment introduced by Thomas Massie that would end all regularly appropriated aid to Israel, stating "Netanyahu’s campaigns in Gaza, Lebanon, the West Bank, and Iran have been horrific. Not one more taxpayer dollar should fund war and destruction instead of lowering costs for Americans."

In September 2026, it was reported she was involved in the second Epstein Files Transparency Act.

== Personal life ==
Ansari is agnostic.

According to financial disclosures, Ansari's father lent her between $250,000 and $500,000 for a condo payment. Ansari's financial disclosures from October 2023 showed that she owns two properties in downtown Phoenix and made between $15,000 and $50,000 in 2023 by renting one. Ansari also estimated in the disclosure that her assets were worth between $2.5 million and $8.3 million.

== Awards and honors ==
In 2019, Ansari was selected for the Grist 50, an annual list of people taking environmental action. In 2020, Ansari was selected for the Forbes 30 Under 30: Policy and Law list.

== Electoral history ==
=== Phoenix City Council elections ===
==== 2020 general election ====
Phoenix City Council District 7, November 3, 2020 general election
Candidate	Votes	%
Cinthia Estela	15,929	32.33
Yassamin Ansari	15,813	32.09
Francisca Montoya	8,897	18.06
G. Grayson Flunoy	4,301	8.73
Susan Mercado-Gudino	4,051	8.22
Write-in	282	0.57
Total votes	49,272	100.00

==== 2021 runoff election ====
Phoenix City Council District 7, March 9, 2021 runoff election
Candidate	Votes	%
Yassamin Ansari	7,850	58.33
Cinthia Estela	5,609	41.67
Total votes	13,459	100.0

=== 2024 U.S. House election ===
==== Democratic primary ====
July 30, 2024 Democratic primary results
Party	Candidate	Votes	%
Democratic	Yassamin Ansari	19,087	44.6
Democratic	Raquel Terán	19,045	44.5
Democratic	Duane Wooten	4,687	10.9
Total votes		42,819	100.0

==== General election ====
2024 Arizona's 3rd congressional district election
Party	Candidate	Votes	%
Democratic	Yassamin Ansari	143,336	70.9
Republican	Jeff Zink	53,705	26.6
Green	Alan Aversa	5,008	2.5
Write-in		16	0.0
Total votes		202,065	100.0

U.S. House of Representatives
Preceded by Ruben Gallego	Member of the U.S. House of Representatives from Arizona's 3rd congressional district 2025–present	Incumbent
U.S. order of precedence (ceremonial)
Preceded by Gil Cisneros	United States representatives by seniority 364th	Succeeded by Tom Barrett
