= Carlos Méndez Martínez =

Puerto Rican politician (born 1943)

Carlos Méndez

Chair of the Puerto Rico Republican Party
- In office 2007 – November 1, 2015
- Preceded by: Tiody de Jesús Ferré
- Succeeded by: Jenniffer González

Mayor of Aguadilla
- In office January 2, 1997 – January 27, 2020
- Preceded by: Agnes Bermúdez Acevedo
- Succeeded by: Yanitsia Irizarry

Personal details
- Born: Carlos Méndez Martínez; June 26, 1943 (age 82) Aguadilla, Puerto Rico
- Party: New Progressive Party (PNP)
- Other political affiliations: Republican
- Spouse(s): Heidi Mayer (1977–1998); Mildred Cortes Ramos
- Children: 1
- Education: University of Washington (BA)

Military service
- Allegiance: United States
- Branch/service: United States Army

Carlos Méndez Martínez (born June 26, 1943) is a Puerto Rican politician and former mayor of Aguadilla, Puerto Rico, for 24 years.

== Early life and education ==
Carlos Méndez-Martínez was born in Aguadilla, Puerto Rico, to Pablo Méndez-Ellinger, a tobacconist from Aguadilla, Puerto Rico, and Rosa Martínez-Rosa, a housewife from Rincón, Puerto Rico. His father died when Méndez was one year old and his mother died when he was nine years old. Without having graduated from high school, at the age of 17, he joined the United States Army, becoming a veteran at the age of 19. He studied silversmithing and gemology and worked in both. He also worked in the real estate business.

At the age of 45, Méndez took the GED and studied an Associate of Arts in Political Science at a community college, and continued to study for a Bachelor of Arts in Political Science at the University of Washington, graduating in 1992. Méndez wrote a book titled Tuve que contar mi historia, which was published in 2009 by Editorial Tiempo Nuevo.

== Political career ==
In 1995, he returned to Puerto Rico, and ran for mayor of Aguadilla at the 1996 general elections. He has been reelected in 2000, 2004, 2008, 2012 and 2016. In the 2008 elections, he received almost 70% of the votes. His margin of victory was one of the largest among elected mayors in that election. He was the president of the Republican Party of Puerto Rico from 2007 to 2015 and president of the Puerto Rico Mayors Federation. In 2012, Méndez endorsed the nomination of Mitt Romney for president of the United States in the 2012 Republican National Convention. After 24 years as mayor, Méndez announced he would not seek re-election in 2020.

Among his notable works as mayor is the Aguadilla Ice Skating Arena, Ramey Base Bowling Alley, Aguadilla Electronic Library, Atlantic Garden Veterans Cemetery, Paseo Real Marina, Las Cascadas Hotel, Aguadilla City Center, Skate and Splash Park, and Tres Palmas Park.

While the "Las Cascadas Hotel" was constructed the hotel was not completed under the mayor's tenure and in 2019 reports indicated the mayor placed the property along with the Aguadilla Ice Skating Arena for sale.

In 2019, Aguadilla received the City Livability Award from the United States Conference of Mayors and honored the efforts spearheaded by Carlos Méndez Martínez.

== Personal life ==
He was married on January 1, 1977, to Heidi G. Méndez (née Mayer) at Seattle in King County, Washington. They had a son, Mark A. Méndez. Méndez divorced in 1998, after 21 years of marriage. In 1999, he met his current wife Mildred Cortes-Ramos.

Political offices
Preceded by Agnes Bermúdez Acevedo	Mayor of Aguadilla; 1997–2020	Succeeded by Yanitsia Irizarry
Party political offices
Preceded by Tiody de Jesús Ferré	Chair of the Puerto Rico Republican Party; 2007–2015	Succeeded by Jenniffer González
