= United States House Natural Resources Subcommittee on Energy and Mineral Resources =

Subcommittee of Committee on Natural Resources
- Active United States House of Representatives; 119th Congress

Leadership
- Chair: Pete Stauber (R)
- Ranking Member: Yassamin Ansari (D)

Structure
- Seats: 26 (24 currently filled) 14/14 10/12
- Political parties: Majority (14): Republican (14); Minority (10): Democratic (10)

Meeting place
- 1333, Longworth House Office Building; Washington, D.C. 20515

Phone number
- (202)-225-9297

The United States House Natural Resources Subcommittee on Energy and Mineral Resources is one of the five subcommittees within the House Natural Resources Committee.

== Jurisdiction ==
1. All measures and matters concerning the U.S. Geological Survey, except for the activities and programs of the Water Resources Division or its successor.
2. All measures and matters affecting geothermal resources.
3. Conservation of United States uranium supply.
4. Mining interests generally, including all matters involving mining regulation and enforcement, including the reclamation of mined lands, the environmental effects of mining, and the management of mineral receipts, mineral land laws and claims, long-range mineral programs and deep seabed mining.
5. Mining schools, experimental stations and long-range mineral programs.
6. Mineral resources on public lands.
7. Conservation and development of oil and gas resources of the Outer Continental Shelf.
8. Petroleum conservation on the public lands and conservation of the radium supply in the United States.
9. Measures and matters concerning the transportation of natural gas from or within Alaska and disposition of oil transported by the trans-Alaska oil pipeline.
10. Rights of way over public lands for underground energy-related transportation.
11. Cooperative efforts to encourage, enhance and improve international programs for the protection of the environment and the conservation of natural resources otherwise within the jurisdiction of the Subcommittee.
12. General and continuing oversight and investigative authority over activities, policies and programs within the jurisdiction of the Subcommittee.
13. Coastal zone management.
14. General and continuing oversight and investigative authority over activities policies and programs within the jurisdiction of the Subcommittee.

== Members, 119th Congress ==
Majority	Minority
Pete Stauber, Minnesota, Chair; Rob Wittman, Virginia; Paul Gosar, Arizona; Daniel Webster, Florida; Russ Fulcher, Idaho; Tom Tiffany, Wisconsin; Jen Kiggans, Virginia; Wesley Hunt, Texas; Mike Collins, Georgia; Harriet Hageman, Wyoming; Mike Ezell, Mississippi; Jeff Crank, Colorado; Nick Begich III, Alaska, Vice Chair; Jeff Hurd, Colorado	Yassamin Ansari, Arizona, Ranking Member; Seth Magaziner, Rhode Island; Dave Min, California; Sarah Elfreth, Maryland; Luz Rivas, California; Debbie Dingell, Michigan; Jared Huffman, California; Jared Golden, Maine; Nydia Velázquez, New York
Ex officio
Bruce Westerman, Arkansas	

== Historical membership rosters ==
=== 115th Congress ===
Majority	Minority
Paul Gosar, Arizona, Chairman; Louie Gohmert, Texas; Doug Lamborn, Colorado; Rob Wittman, Virginia; Steve Pearce, New Mexico; Glenn Thompson, Pennsylvania; Scott Tipton, Colorado; Paul Cook, California, Vice Chair; Bruce Westerman, Arkansas; Garret Graves, Louisiana; Jody Hice, Georgia; Darin LaHood, Illinois; Liz Cheney, Wyoming	Alan Lowenthal, California, Ranking Member; Anthony Brown, Maryland; Jim Costa, California; Niki Tsongas, Massachusetts; Jared Huffman, California; Don Beyer, Virginia; Darren Soto, Florida; Nanette Barragán, California; Nydia Velázquez, New York; Vacancy
Ex officio
Rob Bishop, Utah	Raúl Grijalva, Arizona

=== 116th Congress ===
Majority	Minority
Alan Lowenthal, California, Chair; Mike Levin, California; Joe Cunningham, South Carolina; Donald McEachin, Virginia; Diana Degette, Colorado; Anthony Brown, Maryland; Jared Huffman, California; Vacancy	Paul Gosar, Arizona, Ranking Member; Doug Lamborn, Colorado; Bruce Westerman, Arkansas; Garret Graves, Louisiana; Liz Cheney, Wyoming; Kevin Hern, Oklahoma
Ex officio
Raúl Grijalva, Arizona	Rob Bishop, Utah

=== 117th Congress ===
Majority	Minority
Alan Lowenthal, California, Chair; Donald McEachin, Virginia; Mike Levin, California; Katie Porter, California; Diana Degette, Colorado; Betty McCollum, Minnesota; Jared Huffman, California; Debbie Dingell, Michigan	Pete Stauber, Minnesota, Ranking Member; Yvette Herrell, New Mexico, Vice Ranking Member; Doug Lamborn, Colorado; Garret Graves, Louisiana; Tom Tiffany, Wisconsin
Ex officio
Raúl Grijalva, Arizona	Bruce Westerman, Arkansas

=== 118th Congress ===
Majority	Minority
Pete Stauber, Minnesota, Chair; Wesley Hunt, Texas, Vice Chair; Doug Lamborn, Colorado; Rob Wittman, Virginia; Paul Gosar, Arizona; Garret Graves, Louisiana; Daniel Webster, Florida; Russ Fulcher, Idaho; John Curtis, Utah; Tom Tiffany, Wisconsin; Matt Rosendale, Montana; Lauren Boebert, Colorado; Mike Collins, Georgia; John Duarte, California	Alexandria Ocasio-Cortez, New York, Ranking Member; Jared Huffman, California; Kevin Mullin, California; Sydney Kamlager-Dove, California; Seth Magaziner, Rhode Island; Nydia Velázquez, New York; Debbie Dingell, Michigan; Raúl Grijalva, Arizona; Grace Napolitano, California; Susie Lee, Nevada
Ex officio
Bruce Westerman, Arkansas	
