= United States House Natural Resources Subcommittee on Federal Lands =

Subcommittee of Committee on Natural Resources
- Active United States House of Representatives; 119th Congress

Leadership
- Chair: Tom Tiffany (R)
- Ranking Member: Joe Neguse (D)

Structure
- Seats: 16 (16 currently filled) 9/9 7/7
- Political parties: Majority (9): Republican (9); Minority (7): Democratic (7)

Meeting place
- 1329, Longworth House Office Building; Washington, D.C. 20515

Phone number
- (202)-226-7736

The United States House Natural Resources Subcommittee on Federal Lands is one of the five subcommittees within the House Natural Resources Committee. Until the 118th Congress, it was known as the Subcommittee on National Parks, Forests and Public Lands.

== Jurisdiction ==
1. Measures and matters related to the National Park System and its units, including Federal reserved water rights.
2. The National Wilderness Preservation System.
3. Wild and Scenic Rivers System, National Trails System, national heritage areas and other national units established for protection, conservation, preservation or recreational development, other than coastal barriers.
4. Military parks and battlefields, national cemeteries administered by the Secretary of the Interior, parks in the within the vicinity of the District of Columbia and the erection of monuments to the memory of individuals.
5. Federal and non-Federal outdoor recreation plans, programs and administration including the Land and Water Conservation Fund Act of 1965 and the Outdoor Recreation Act of 1963.
6. Preservation of prehistoric ruins and objects of interest on the public domain and other historic preservation programs and activities, including national monuments, historic sites and programs for international cooperation in the field of historic preservation.
7. Matters concerning the following agencies and programs: Urban Parks and Recreation Recovery Program, Historic American Buildings Survey, Historic American Engineering Record, and the U.S. Holocaust Memorial Museum.
8. Public lands generally, including measures or matters relating to entry, easements, withdrawals, grazing and Federal reserved water rights.
9. Forfeiture of land grants to alien ownership, including alien ownership of mineral lands.
10. Cooperative efforts to encourage, enhance and improve international programs for the protection of the environment and the conservation of natural resources otherwise within the jurisdiction of the Subcommittee.
11. Forest reservations, including management thereof, created from the public domain.
12. Public forest lands generally, including measures or matters related to entry, easements, withdrawals, grazing and Federal reserved water rights.
13. Wildlife resources, including research, restoration, refuges and conservation, including National Wildlife Refuges.
14. General and continuing oversight and investigative authority over activities, policies and programs within the jurisdiction of the Subcommittee.

== Members, 119th Congress ==
Majority	Minority
Tom Tiffany, Wisconsin, Chair; Tom McClintock, California; Russ Fulcher, Idaho; Pete Stauber, Minnesota; Cliff Bentz, Oregon; Wesley Hunt, Texas; Mark Amodei, Nevada; Celeste Maloy, Utah; Mike Kennedy, Utah, Vice Chair	Joe Neguse, Colorado, Ranking Member; Raúl Grijalva, Arizona (until March 13, 2025); Teresa Leger Fernandez, New Mexico; Melanie Stansbury, New Mexico; Jared Golden, Maine; Maxine Dexter, Oregon; Emily Randall, Washington
Ex officio
Bruce Westerman, Arkansas	Jared Huffman, California

== Historical membership rosters ==
=== 117th Congress ===
Majority	Minority
Joe Neguse, Colorado, Chair; Gregorio Sablan, N. Mariana Islands; Diana DeGette, Colorado; Paul Tonko, New York; Rashida Tlaib, Michigan; Lori Trahan, Massachusetts; Ruben Gallego, Arizona; Teresa Leger Fernandez, New Mexico; Debbie Dingell, Michigan; Ed Case, Hawaii; Michael San Nicolas, Guam; Katie Porter, California	Russ Fulcher, Idaho, Ranking Member; Tom Tiffany, Wisconsin, Vice Ranking Member; Louie Gohmert, Texas; Doug Lamborn, Colorado; Tom McClintock, California; Don Young, Alaska (until March 18, 2022); Jody Hice, Georgia; Matt Rosendale, Montana; Blake Moore, Utah; Yvette Herrell, New Mexico; Jay Obernolte, California
Ex officio
Raúl Grijalva, Arizona	Bruce Westerman, Arkansas

=== 116th Congress ===
Majority	Minority
Deb Haaland, New Mexico, Chair; Joe Neguse, Colorado; Debbie Dingell, Michigan; Steven Horsford, Nevada; Jared Huffman, California; Ruben Gallego, Arizona; Alan Lowenthal, California; Ed Case, Hawaii; Paul Tonko, New York; Vacancy	Don Young, Alaska, Ranking Member; Louie Gohmert, Texas; Tom McClintock, California; Paul Cook, California; Bruce Westerman, Arkansas; Jody Hice, Georgia; Daniel Webster, Florida; John Curtis, Utah; Russ Fulcher, Idaho
Ex officio
Raúl Grijalva, Arizona	Rob Bishop, Utah

=== 115th Congress ===
Majority	Minority
Tom McClintock, California, Chairman; Don Young, Alaska; Steve Pearce, New Mexico; Glenn Thompson, Pennsylvania; Raúl Labrador, Idaho; Scott Tipton, Colorado; Bruce Westerman, Arkansas, Vice Chair; Darin LaHood, Illinois; Daniel Webster, Florida; David Rouzer, North Carolina; Jack Bergman, Michigan; Liz Cheney, Wyoming	Colleen Hanabusa, Hawaii, Ranking Member; Niki Tsongas, Massachusetts; Alan Lowenthal, California; Norma Torres, California; Ruben Gallego, Arizona; Don McEachin, Virginia; Anthony Brown, Maryland; Jimmy Gomez, California; 2 Vacancies
Ex officio
Rob Bishop, Utah	Raúl Grijalva, Arizona

=== 118th Congress ===
Majority	Minority
Tom Tiffany, Wisconsin, Chair; John Curtis, Utah, Vice Chair; Doug Lamborn, Colorado; Tom McClintock, California; Russ Fulcher, Idaho; Pete Stauber, Minnesota; Cliff Bentz, Oregon; Jen Kiggans, Virginia; James Moylan, Guam	Joe Neguse, Colorado, Ranking Member; Katie Porter, California; Sydney Kamlager-Dove, California; Gregorio Sablan, N. Mariana Islands; Mike Levin, California; Teresa Leger Fernandez, New Mexico; Mary Peltola, Alaska
Ex officio
Bruce Westerman, Arkansas	Raúl Grijalva, Arizona
