= United States House Committee on Natural Resources =

Standing committee of the United States House of Representatives

House Natural Resources Committee
Standing committee
- Active United States House of Representatives; 119th Congress

History
- Formed: 1991
- Succeeded: Committee on Interior and Insular Affairs
- Formerly known as: Committee on Resources

Leadership
- Chair: Bruce Westerman (R); Since January 3, 2023
- Ranking Member: Jared Huffman (D); Since January 4, 2025

Structure
- Seats: 45 (45 currently filled) 25/25 20/20
- Political parties: Majority (25): Republican (25); Minority (20): Democratic (20)

Jurisdiction
- Policy areas: Energy development, mining, mineral rights, wildlife, fisheries, public lands, oceans, Native Americans
- Oversight authority: Department of Energy
- Senate counterpart: Senate Committee on Energy and Natural Resources

Subcommittees
- Energy and Mineral Resources; Federal Lands; Water, Wildlife and Fisheries; Oversight and Investigations; Indian and Insular Affairs

Meeting place
- 1324A, Longworth House Office Building; Washington, D.C. 20515

Website
- naturalresources.house.gov (Republican) democrats-naturalresources.house.gov (Democratic)

Phone number
- (202)-225-2761

Rules
- Rule X.1(m), Rules of the House of Representatives (118th Congress); Rules for the Committee on Natural Resources (118th Congress)

The U.S. House Committee on Natural Resources or Natural Resources Committee (often referred to as simply Resources) is a Congressional committee of the United States House of Representatives. Originally called the Committee on Interior and Insular Affairs (1951), the name was changed to the Committee on Natural Resources in 1991. The name was shortened to the Committee on Resources in 1995 by the new chair, Don Young (at the same time, the committee took over the duties of the now-defunct Merchant Marine and Fisheries Committee). Following the Democratic takeover of the House of Representatives in 2006, the name of the committee was changed back to its title used between 1991 and 1995.

== Jurisdiction ==
1. Fisheries and wildlife, including research, restoration, refuges, and conservation.
2. Forest reserves and national parks created from the public domain.
3. Forfeiture of land grants and alien ownership, including alien ownership of mineral lands.
4. Geological Survey.
5. International fishing agreements.
6. Interstate compacts relating to apportionment of waters for irrigation purposes.
7. Irrigation and reclamation, including water supply for reclamation projects and easements of public lands for irrigation projects; and acquisition of private lands when necessary to complete irrigation projects.
8. Native Americans generally, including the care and allotment of Native American lands and general and special measures relating to claims that are paid out of Native American funds.
9. Insular areas of the United States generally (except those affecting the revenue and appropriations).
10. Military parks and battlefields, national cemeteries administered by the Secretary of the Interior, parks within the District of Columbia, and the erection of monuments to the memory of individuals.
11. Mineral land laws and claims and entries thereunder.
12. Mineral resources of public lands.
13. Mining interests generally.
14. Mining schools and experimental stations.
15. Marine affairs, including coastal zone management (except for measures relating to oil and other pollution of navigable waters).
16. Oceanography.
17. Petroleum conservation on public lands and conservation of the radium supply in the United States.
18. Preservation of prehistoric ruins and objects of interest on the public domain.
19. Public lands generally, including entry, easements, and grazing thereon.
20. Relations of the United States with Native Americans and Native American tribes.
21. Trans-Alaska Oil Pipeline (except ratemaking).

== Members, 119th Congress ==
Majority	Minority
Bruce Westerman, Arkansas, Chair; Rob Wittman, Virginia, Vice Chair; Tom McClintock, California; Paul Gosar, Arizona; Amata Coleman Radewagen, American Samoa; Doug LaMalfa, California (until January 6, 2026); Daniel Webster, Florida; Russ Fulcher, Idaho; Pete Stauber, Minnesota; Tom Tiffany, Wisconsin; Lauren Boebert, Colorado; Cliff Bentz, Oregon; Jen Kiggans, Virginia; James Moylan, Guam; Wesley Hunt, Texas; Mike Collins, Georgia; Harriet Hageman, Wyoming; Mark Amodei, Nevada; Tim Walberg, Michigan; Mike Ezell, Mississippi; Celeste Maloy, Utah; Addison McDowell, North Carolina; Jeff Crank, Colorado; Nick Begich III, Alaska; Jeff Hurd, Colorado; Mike Kennedy, Utah; Troy Downing, Montana (from March 25, 2026)	Jared Huffman, California, Ranking Member; Raúl Grijalva, Arizona (until March 13, 2025), Ranking Member Emeritus; Joe Neguse, Colorado; Teresa Leger Fernandez, New Mexico; Melanie Stansbury, New Mexico; Val Hoyle, Oregon; Seth Magaziner, Rhode Island; Jared Golden, Maine; Dave Min, California; Maxine Dexter, Oregon; Pablo Hernández Rivera, Puerto Rico; Emily Randall, Washington; Yassamin Ansari, Arizona; Sarah Elfreth, Maryland, Vice Ranking Member; Adam Gray, California; Luz Rivas, California; Adelita Grijalva, Arizona (from November 18, 2025); Nydia Velázquez, New York; Debbie Dingell, Michigan; Darren Soto, Florida; Julia Brownley, California; Susie Lee, Nevada (from May 20, 2025)

Resolutions electing members: H.Res. 13 (Chair), H.Res. 14 (Ranking Member), H.Res. 42 (R), H.Res. 44 (D), H.Res. 55 (D), H.Res. 430 (Lee), H.Res. 887 (Grijalva), H.Res. 1135 (Downing)

== Subcommittees ==
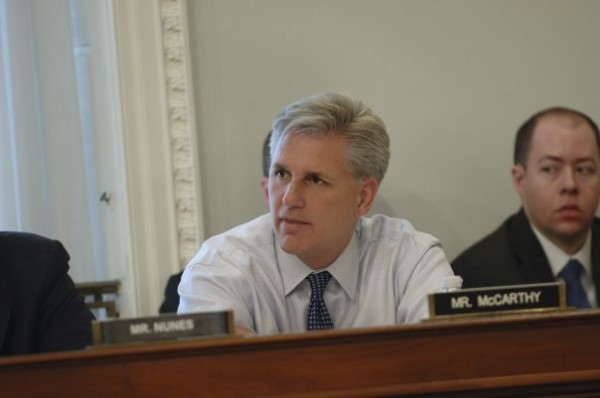
Representative Kevin McCarthy (R) at an oversight hearing of the House Natural Resources Subcommittee on Water and Power

In the 111th Congress, the number of subcommittees was reduced from 5 to 4. The Subcommittees on Insular Affairs and Fisheries, Wildlife and Oceans were merged into the Subcommittee on Insular Affairs, Oceans and Wildlife. In the 112th Congress, the number was again increased to 5, adding the Subcommittee on Indian and Alaska Native Affairs.

During the committee's official reorganization for the 113th Congress, the Subcommittee on National Parks, Forests and Public Lands was renamed the Subcommittee on Public Lands and Environmental Regulation

When former Chair Doc Hastings of Washington retired from Congress, Rob Bishop of Utah took over as the committee's new chair at the beginning of the 114th Congress. Congressman Bishop began the process of hiring new staff and reorganized the committee's structure as his predecessors had done. The chair eliminated the Fisheries, Wildlife, Oceans and Insular Affairs subcommittee and split its duties between the renamed Indian, Insular and Alaska Native Affairs and Water, Power and Oceans subcommittees. The chair also created a new Subcommittee on Oversight and Investigations, keeping the total number of subcommittees at five

The chair also transferred jurisdiction over the National Environmental Policy Act and the Endangered Species Act from the former Public Lands and Environmental Regulation and established a renamed the Subcommittee on Federal Lands.

=== Current subcommittees ===
Subcommittee	Chair	Ranking Member
Energy and Mineral Resources	Pete Stauber (R-MN)	Yassamin Ansari (D-AZ)
Federal Lands	Tom Tiffany (R-WI)	Joe Neguse (D-CO)
Indian and Insular Affairs	Jeff Hurd (R-CO)	Teresa Leger Fernandez (D-NM)
Oversight and Investigations	Paul Gosar (R-AZ)	Maxine Dexter (D-OR)
Water, Wildlife and Fisheries	Harriet Hageman (R-WY)	Val Hoyle (D-OR)

== Leadership ==
Former chairs and ranking members are listed below.

=== Committee on Public Lands ===
Chairs
Name	Party	State	Start	End
Andrew Gregg	Democratic-Republican	Pennsylvania	1805	1806
John Boyle	Democratic-Republican	Kentucky	1806	1807
Andrew Gregg	Democratic-Republican	Pennsylvania	1807	
John Boyle	Democratic-Republican	Kentucky	1807	1808
Jeremiah Morrow	Democratic-Republican	Ohio	1808	1813
Samuel McKee	Democratic-Republican	Kentucky	1813	1815
Thomas Robertson	Democratic-Republican	Louisiana	1815	1818
George Poindexter	Democratic-Republican	Mississippi	1818	1819
Richard Anderson	Democratic-Republican	Kentucky	1819	1821
Christopher Rankin	Jacksonian	Mississippi	1821	1826
John Scott	Anti-Jacksonian	Missouri	1826	1827
Jacob Isacks	Jacksonian	Tennessee	1827	1830
Charles Wickliffe	Jacksonian	Kentucky	1830	1833
Clement Clay	Democratic	Alabama	1833	1835
Ratliff Boon	Democratic	Indiana	1835	1838
Zadok Casey	Democratic	Illinois	1838	1839
Thomas Corwin	Whig	Ohio	1839	1840
Samson Mason	Whig	Ohio	1840	
Jeremiah Morrow	Whig	Ohio	1840	1841
William Johnson	Whig	Maryland	1841	
Jeremiah Morrow	Whig	Ohio	1841	1842
Reuben Chapman	Democratic	Alabama	1842	
Jeremiah Morrow	Whig	Ohio	1842	1843
John Davis	Democratic	Indiana	1843	1845
John McClernand	Democratic	Illinois	1845	1847
Jacob Collamer	Whig	Vermont	1847	1849
James Bowlin	Democratic	Missouri	1849	1851
Willard Hall	Democratic	Missouri	1851	1853
David Disney	Democratic	Ohio	1853	1855
Henry Bennett	Opposition	New York	1855	1857
Williamson Cobb	Democratic	Alabama	1857	1859
Eli Thayer	Republican	Massachusetts	1859	1861
John Potter	Republican	Wisconsin	1861	1863
George Julian	Republican	Indiana	1863	1871
John Ketcham	Republican	New York	1871	1873
Washington Townsend	Republican	Pennsylvania	1873	1875
Milton Sayler	Democratic	Ohio	1875	1877
William Morrison	Democratic	Illinois	1877	1879
George Converse	Democratic	Ohio	1879	1881
Thaddeus Pound	Republican	Wisconsin	1881	1883
Thomas Cobb	Democratic	Indiana	1883	1887
William Holman	Democratic	Indiana	1887	1889
Lewis Payson	Republican	Illinois	1889	1891
Thomas McRae	Democratic	Arkansas	1891	1895
John Lacey	Republican	Iowa	1895	1907
Franklin Mondell	Republican	Wyoming	1907	1911
Joseph Robinson	Democratic	Arkansas	1911	1912
Scott Ferris	Democratic	Oklahoma	1912	1919
Nicholas Sinnott	Republican	Oregon	1919	1928
Don Colton	Republican	Utah	1928	1931
John Evans	Democratic	Montana	1931	1933
René De Rouen	Democratic	Louisiana	1933	1940
James Robinson	Democratic	Utah	1940	1943
Hardin Peterson	Democratic	Florida	1943	1947
Richard Welch	Republican	California	1947	1949
Andrew Somers	Democratic	New York	1949	
Hardin Peterson	Democratic	Florida	1949	1951

Ranking members
Name	Party	State	Start	End
Andrew Somers	Democratic	New York	1947	1949
Richard Welch	Republican	California	1949	
Fred Crawford	Republican	Michigan	1949	1951

=== Committee on Interior and Insular Affairs ===
Chairs
Name	Party	State	Start	End
John Murdock	Democratic	Arizona	1951	1953
Arthur Miller	Republican	Nebraska	1953	1955
Clair Engle	Democratic	California	1955	1959
Wayne Aspinall	Democratic	Colorado	1959	1973
James Haley	Democratic	Florida	1973	1977
Mo Udall	Democratic	Arizona	1977	1991

Ranking members
Name	Party	State	Start	End
Fred Crawford	Republican	Michigan	1951	1953
Clair Engle	Democratic	California	1953	1955
Arthur Miller	Republican	Nebraska	1955	1959
John Saylor	Republican	Pennsylvania	1959	1973
Craig Hosmer	Republican	California	1973	1974
Joe Skubitz	Republican	Kansas	1975	1978
Don Clausen	Republican	California	1978	1981
Manuel Lujan	Republican	New Mexico	1981	1985
Don Young	Republican	Alaska	1985	1991

=== Committee on Natural Resources ===
Chair
Name	Party	State	Start	End
George Miller	Democratic	California	1991	1995

Ranking member
Name	Party	State	Start	End
Don Young	Republican	Alaska	1991	1995

=== Committee on Resources ===
Chairs
Name	Party	State	Start	End
Don Young	Republican	Alaska	1995	2001
James Hansen	Republican	Utah	2001	2003
Richard Pombo	Republican	California	2003	2007

Ranking members
Name	Party	State	Start	End
George Miller	Democratic	California	1995	2001
Nick Rahall	Democratic	West Virginia	2001	2007

=== Committee on Natural Resources ===
Chairs
Name	Party	State	Start	End
Nick Rahall	Democratic	West Virginia	2007	2011
Doc Hastings	Republican	Washington	2011	2015
Rob Bishop	Republican	Utah	2015	2019
Raúl Grijalva	Democratic	Arizona	2019	2023
Bruce Westerman	Republican	Arkansas	2023	present

Ranking members
Name	Party	State	Start	End
Don Young	Republican	Alaska	2007	2009
Doc Hastings	Republican	Washington	2009	2011
Ed Markey	Democratic	Massachusetts	2011	2013
Pete DeFazio	Democratic	Oregon	2013	2015
Raúl Grijalva	Democratic	Arizona	2015	2019
Rob Bishop	Republican	Utah	2019	2021
Bruce Westerman	Republican	Arkansas	2021	2023
Raúl Grijalva	Democratic	Arizona	2023	2025
Jared Huffman	Democratic	California	2025	present

== Historical membership rosters ==
=== 118th Congress ===
Majority	Minority
Bruce Westerman, Arkansas, Chair; Doug Lamborn, Colorado, Vice Chair; Rob Wittman, Virginia; Tom McClintock, California; Paul Gosar, Arizona; Garret Graves, Louisiana; Amata Coleman Radewagen, American Samoa; Daniel Webster, Florida; Jenniffer González, Puerto Rico; Russ Fulcher, Idaho; Pete Stauber, Minnesota; John Curtis, Utah; Tom Tiffany, Wisconsin; Jerry Carl, Alabama; Matt Rosendale, Montana; Lauren Boebert, Colorado; Cliff Bentz, Oregon; Jen Kiggans, Virginia; James Moylan, Guam; Wesley Hunt, Texas; Mike Collins, Georgia; Anna Paulina Luna, Florida; John Duarte, California; Harriet Hageman, Wyoming	Raúl Grijalva, Arizona, Ranking Member; Grace Napolitano, California; Jim Costa, California (until February 27, 2023); Gregorio Sablan, Northern Mariana Islands; Jared Huffman, California; Ruben Gallego, Arizona; Joe Neguse, Colorado; Mike Levin, California; Katie Porter, California; Teresa Leger Fernandez, New Mexico; Melanie Stansbury, New Mexico; Mary Peltola, Alaska; Alexandria Ocasio-Cortez, New York; Kevin Mullin, California; Val Hoyle, Oregon; Sydney Kamlager-Dove, California, Vice Ranking Member; Seth Magaziner, Rhode Island; Nydia Velázquez, New York; Ed Case, Hawaii; Debbie Dingell, Michigan; Susie Lee, Nevada (from February 23, 2023)

Resolutions electing members: H.Res. 14 (Chair), H.Res. 15 (Ranking Member), H.Res. 79 (D), H.Res. 80 (R), H.Res. 164 (D)

Subcommittees

Subcommittee	Chair	Ranking Member
Energy and Mineral Resources	Pete Stauber (R-MN)	Alexandria Ocasio-Cortez (D-NY)
Federal Lands	Tom Tiffany (R-WI)	Joe Neguse (D-CO)
Indian and Insular Affairs	Harriet Hageman (R-WY)	Teresa Leger Fernandez (D-NM)
Oversight and Investigations	Paul Gosar (R-AZ)	Melanie Stansbury (D-NM)
Water, Wildlife and Fisheries	Cliff Bentz (R-OR)	Jared Huffman (D-CA)

=== 117th Congress ===
Majority	Minority
Raúl Grijalva, Arizona, Chair; Grace Napolitano, California; Jim Costa, California; Gregorio Sablan, N. Mariana Islands, Vice Chair (Insular Affairs); Jared Huffman, California; Alan Lowenthal, California; Ruben Gallego, Arizona; Joe Neguse, Colorado; Mike Levin, California; Katie Porter, California; Teresa Leger Fernandez, New Mexico; Melanie Stansbury, New Mexico (since June 15, 2021); Mary Peltola, Alaska (since September 14, 2022); Nydia Velázquez, New York; Diana DeGette, Colorado; Julia Brownley, California; Debbie Dingell, Michigan; Donald McEachin, Virginia; Darren Soto, Florida; Michael San Nicolas, Guam; Chuy García, Illinois, Vice Chair; Ed Case, Hawaii; Betty McCollum, Minnesota; Steven Cohen, Tennessee; Paul Tonko, New York; Rashida Tlaib, Michigan; Doris Matsui, California; Lori Trahan, Massachusetts (until September 14, 2022)	Bruce Westerman, Arkansas, Ranking Member; Don Young, Alaska (until March 18, 2022); Louie Gohmert, Texas, Vice Ranking Member; Doug Lamborn, Colorado; Rob Wittman, Virginia; Tom McClintock, California; Paul Gosar, Arizona (until November 17, 2021); Garret Graves, Louisiana; Jody Hice, Georgia; Amata Coleman Radewagen, Am. Samoa, Vice Ranking Member (Insular Affairs); Daniel Webster, Florida; Jenniffer González, Puerto Rico; Russ Fulcher, Idaho; Pete Stauber, Minnesota; Tom Tiffany, Wisconsin; Jerry Carl, Alabama; Matt Rosendale, Montana; Blake Moore, Utah; Yvette Herrell, New Mexico; Lauren Boebert, Colorado; Jay Obernolte, California; Cliff Bentz, Oregon; Connie Conway, California (since June 22, 2022)

Resolutions electing members: H.Res. 9 (Chair), H.Res. 10 (Ranking Member), H.Res. 62 (D), H.Res. 63 (R), H.Res. 92 (D), H.Res. 111 (D), H.Res. 475 (D), H.Res. 789 (Removing Gosar), H.Res. 1197 (R), H.Res. 1347 (D)

Subcommittees

Subcommittee	Chair	Ranking Member
Energy and Mineral Resources	Alan Lowenthal (D-CA)	Pete Stauber (R-MN)
Indigenous Peoples of the United States	Teresa Leger Fernandez (D-NM)	Don Young (R-AK)
National Parks, Forests and Public Lands	Joe Neguse (D-CO)	Russ Fulcher (R-ID)
Oversight and Investigations	Katie Porter (D-CA)	Blake Moore (R-UT)
Water, Oceans and Wildlife	Jared Huffman (D-CA)	Cliff Bentz (R-OR)

=== 116th Congress ===
Majority	Minority
Raúl Grijalva, Arizona, Chair; Grace Napolitano, California; Jim Costa, California; Gregorio Sablan, N. Mariana Islands, Vice Chair (Insular Affairs); Jared Huffman, California; Alan Lowenthal, California; Ruben Gallego, Arizona; TJ Cox, California; Joe Neguse, Colorado; Mike Levin, California; Deb Haaland, New Mexico, Vice Chair; Joe Cunningham, South Carolina; Nydia Velázquez, New York; Diana DeGette, Colorado; Lacy Clay, Missouri; Debbie Dingell, Michigan; Anthony Brown, Maryland; Donald McEachin, Virginia; Darren Soto, Florida; Ed Case, Hawaii; Steven Horsford, Nevada; Michael San Nicolas, Guam; Matt Cartwright, Pennsylvania; Paul Tonko, New York; Chuy García, Illinois (since January 14, 2020); Nanette Barragán, California (since September 22, 2020)	Rob Bishop, Utah, Ranking Member; Don Young, Alaska; Louie Gohmert, Texas; Doug Lamborn, Colorado; Rob Wittman, Virginia; Tom McClintock, California; Paul Gosar, Arizona; Paul Cook, California; Bruce Westerman, Arkansas; Garret Graves, Louisiana; Jody Hice, Georgia; Amata Coleman Radewagen, American Samoa; Daniel Webster, Florida, Vice Ranking Member; Liz Cheney, Wyoming; Mike Johnson, Louisiana; Jenniffer González, Puerto Rico, Vice Ranking Member (Insular Affairs); John Curtis, Utah; Kevin Hern, Oklahoma; Russ Fulcher, Idaho; Jeff Van Drew, (Note: Van Drew left the Democratic Party on December 19, 2019, to join Republicans.) New Jersey; Pete Stauber, Minnesota (since July 30, 2020)

Sources: H.Res. 24 (Chair), H.Res. 25 (Ranking Member), H.Res. 73 (D), H.Res. 74 (R), H.Res. 125 (D), H.Res. 148 (D), H.Res. 793 (D), H.Res. 1072 (R), H.Res. 1135 (D)

Subcommittees

Subcommittee	Chair	Ranking Member
Energy and Mineral Resources	Alan Lowenthal (D-CA)	Paul Gosar (R-AZ)
Indigenous Peoples of the United States	Ruben Gallego (D-AZ)	Paul Cook (R-CA)
National Parks, Forests and Public Lands	Deb Haaland (D-NM)	Don Young (R-AK)
Oversight and Investigations	TJ Cox (D-CA)	Louie Gohmert (R-TX)
Water, Oceans and Wildlife	Jared Huffman (D-CA)	Tom McClintock (R-CA)

=== 115th Congress ===
Majority	Minority
Rob Bishop, Utah, Chair; Don Young, Alaska; Louie Gohmert, Texas, Vice Chair; Doug Lamborn, Colorado; Rob Wittman, Virginia; Tom McClintock, California; Steve Pearce, New Mexico; Glenn Thompson, Pennsylvania; Paul Gosar, Arizona; Raúl Labrador, Idaho; Scott Tipton, Colorado; Doug LaMalfa, California; Jeff Denham, California; Paul Cook, California; Bruce Westerman, Arkansas; Garret Graves, Louisiana; Jody Hice, Georgia; Amata Coleman Radewagen, American Samoa; Darin LaHood, Illinois; Daniel Webster, Florida; David Rouzer, North Carolina; Jack Bergman, Michigan; Liz Cheney, Wyoming; Mike Johnson, Louisiana; Jenniffer González, Puerto Rico; Greg Gianforte, Montana	Raúl Grijalva, Arizona, Ranking Member; Grace Napolitano, California; Madeleine Bordallo, Guam; Jim Costa, California; Gregorio Sablan, Northern Mariana Islands; Niki Tsongas, Massachusetts; Jared Huffman, California, Vice Ranking Member; Don Beyer, Virginia; Norma Torres, California; Ruben Gallego, Arizona; Colleen Hanabusa, Hawaii; Nanette Barragán, California; Darren Soto, Florida; Jimmy Panetta, California (until April 2017); Donald McEachin, Virginia; Anthony Brown, Maryland; Alan Lowenthal, California; Lacy Clay, Missouri; Jimmy Gomez, California; Nydia Velázquez, New York (since April 2018)

== See also ==
- List of United States House of Representatives committees
