= Ruben Gallego =

American politician (born 1979)

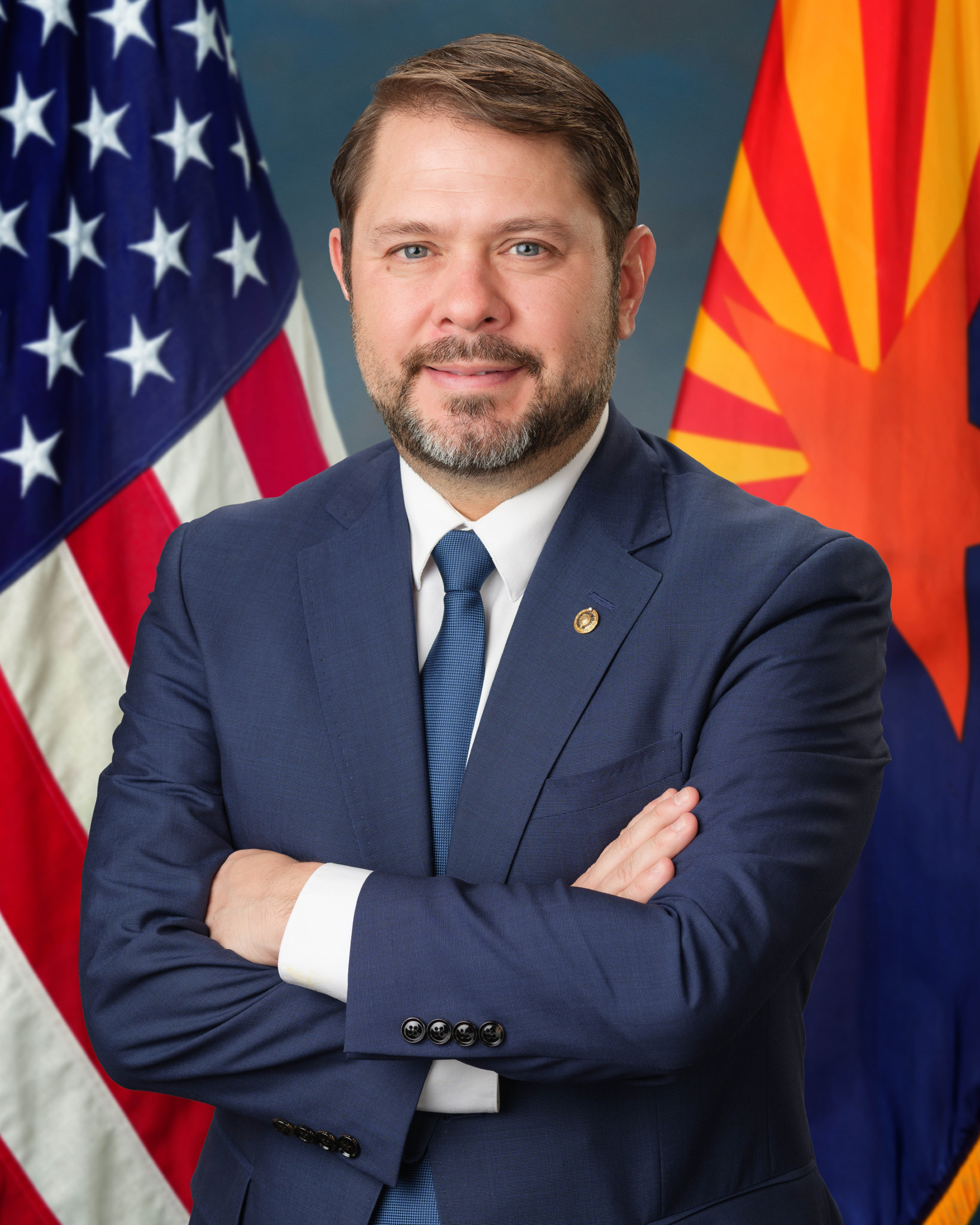
- Official portrait, 2025

United States Senator from Arizona
- Incumbent
- Assumed office January 3, 2025 Serving with Mark Kelly
- Preceded by: Kyrsten Sinema

Member of the U.S. House of Representatives from Arizona
- In office January 3, 2015 – January 3, 2025
- Preceded by: Ed Pastor
- Succeeded by: Yassamin Ansari
- Constituency: 7th district (2015–2023); 3rd district (2023–2025)

Member of the Arizona House of Representatives
- In office January 10, 2011 – March 14, 2014 Serving with Catherine Miranda
- Preceded by: Cloves Campbell Jr.
- Succeeded by: Norma Muñoz
- Constituency: 16th district (2011–2013); 27th district (2013–2014)

Personal details
- Born: Ruben Marinelarena; November 20, 1979 (age 46) Chicago, Illinois, U.S.
- Party: Democratic
- Spouses: Kate Widland (m. 2010; div. 2017); Sydney Barron (m. 2021)
- Children: 3
- Education: Harvard University (BA)
- Website: Senate website Campaign website

Military service
- Branch/service: United States Marine Corps; Marine Corps Reserve
- Years of service: 2002–2006
- Rank: Corporal
- Unit: 3rd Battalion, 25th Marines
- Battles/wars: Iraq War
- Gallego's voice Gallego supporting the PAVA Program Inclusion Act. Recorded September 29, 2022

Ruben Marinelarena Gallego (/ˈruːbən ɡaɪˈɛɡoʊ/ ROO-bən gah-YAY-goh; né Marinelarena; born November 20, 1979) is an American politician serving since 2025 as the junior United States Senator from Arizona. A member of the Democratic Party, he served from 2011 to 2014 as a member of the Arizona House of Representatives and from 2015 to 2025 as a member of the U.S. House of Representatives.

Gallego was elected to Congress in 2014 as a progressive and drew attention for his combative social media presence, including criticism of Arizona senator Kyrsten Sinema, who opposed efforts to abolish the Senate filibuster to pass Democratic legislation. Democrats and progressive organizations encouraged him to challenge Sinema in the Democratic primary. In 2023, Gallego announced his candidacy for the 2024 U.S. Senate election in Arizona. Sinema later registered as an independent and chose not to seek reelection. Gallego rebranded himself as a moderate Democrat and defeated Republican nominee Kari Lake in the general election.

Gallego is the first Hispanic to be elected to represent Arizona in the United States Senate. After taking office, he became one of the first two Colombian American U.S. senators, along with Republican Bernie Moreno of Ohio.

== Early life and education ==
Gallego was born in Chicago, Illinois, and is a first-generation American, with a Colombian mother and a Mexican father. He and his three sisters were raised solely by their mother, Elisa Gallego, who was from Antioquia Department, Colombia.

The family moved to the Chicago suburb of Evergreen Park, and Gallego graduated from Evergreen Park Community High School in 1998.

Gallego attended Harvard College, where he became a member of Sigma Chi fraternity and graduated in 2004 with a bachelor's degree in government.

== Early career ==
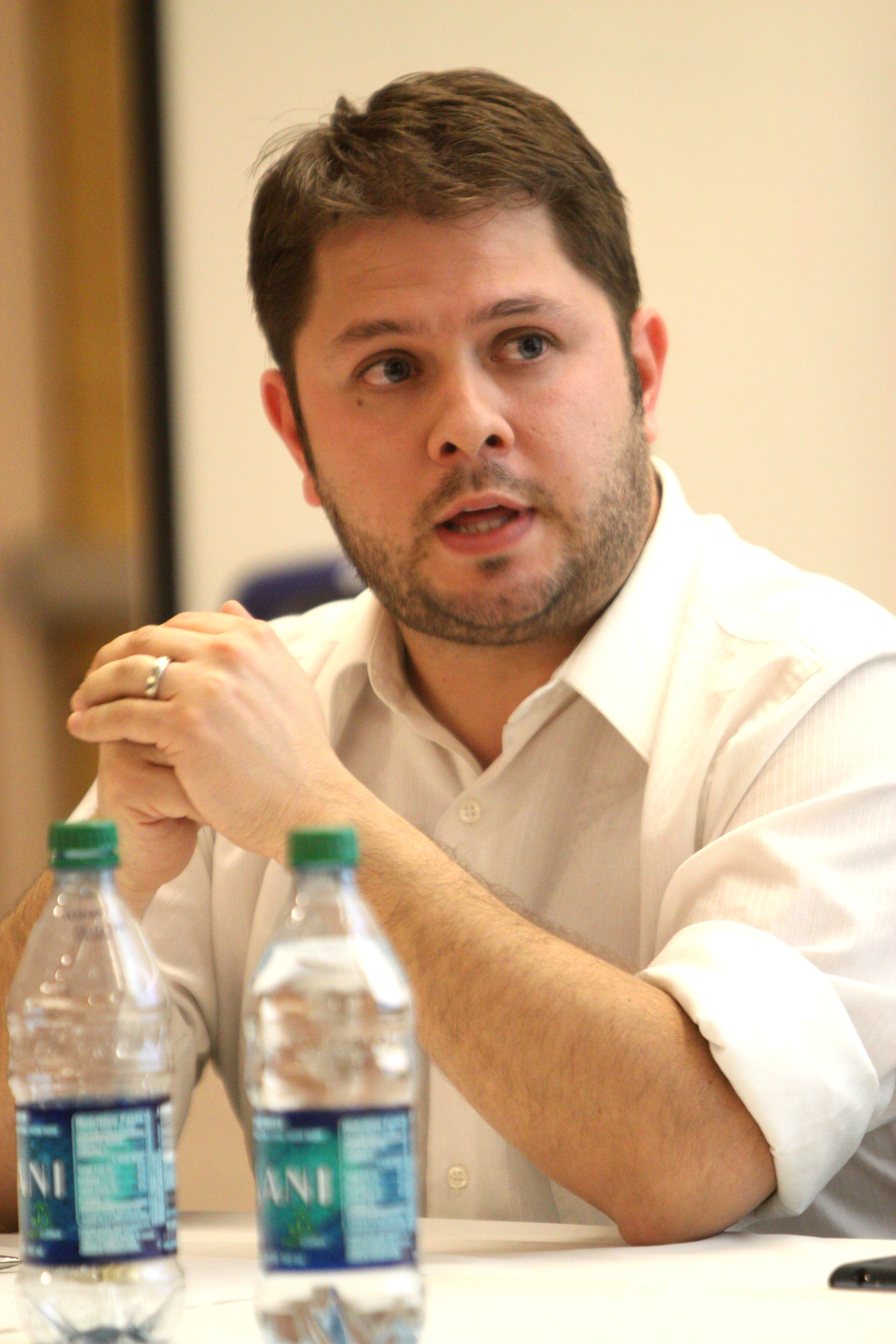
Gallego in 2013

Gallego served in the Marines from 2002 to 2006. After completing training in the School of Infantry (SOI), he was deployed to Iraq with Lima Company, 3rd Battalion, 25th Marines. Gallego served as a lance corporal. The 3/25 lost 46 marines and one Navy corpsman between January 2005 and January 2006. Gallego's best friend died during combat operations in Iraq.

In 2007, Gallego led District 7 Phoenix City Council candidate Michael Nowakowski's successful campaign before serving as Nowakowski's chief of staff. In 2009, he stepped down as chief of staff to focus on his campaign for the Arizona State House in District 16, which he won in 2010.

In 2011, The Arizona Republic named Gallego a distinguished freshman lawmaker. His first successful bill granted in-state tuition status to veterans residing in Arizona. Gallego supported the repeal of Arizona SB 1070. In 2012, Gallego was elected assistant minority leader.

Gallego founded the group Citizens for Professional Law Enforcement to recall Maricopa County sheriff Joe Arpaio, citing Arpaio's immigration policies and his use of taxpayer money to investigate Barack Obama's citizenship. The recall failed; Arpaio remained in office until losing reelection in 2016. Gallego worked for Strategies 360 as Director of Latino and New Media operations. He also worked for RIESTER, one of Arizona's largest public relations firms.

== U.S. House of Representatives ==
=== Elections ===
==== 2014 ====
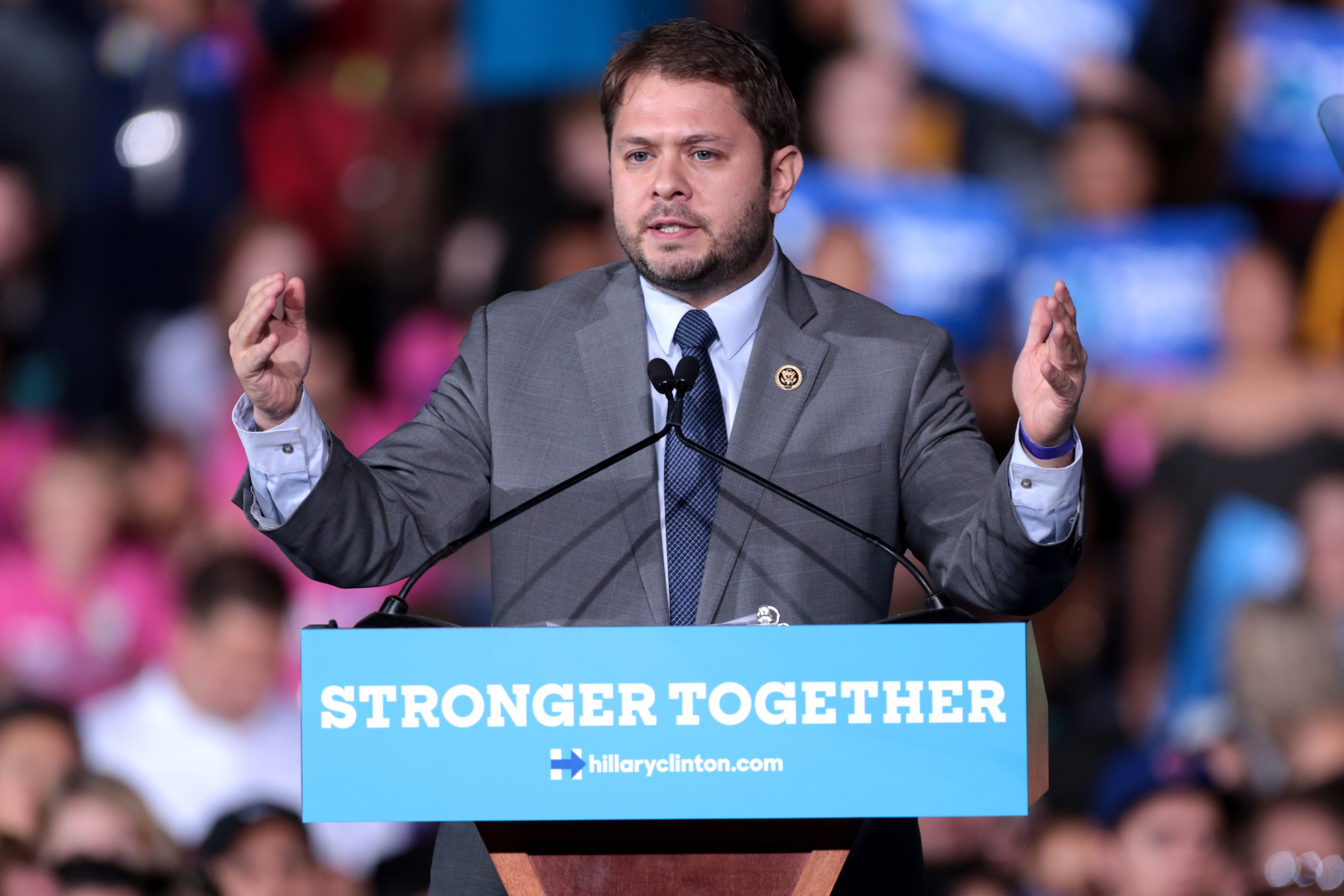
Gallego speaking at a rally for presidential candidate Hillary Clinton in 2016

On February 27, 2014, Gallego announced his candidacy for Congress in Arizona's 7th congressional district. Although not required to give up his seat under Arizona's resign-to-run laws (since he was in the final year of his state House term), Gallego resigned from the Arizona House in March 2014.

Gallego won a five-way Democratic primary with 48.9% of the vote, defeating Mary Rose Wilcox, who was retiring congressman Ed Pastor's choice to succeed him and was backed by a number of progressive groups. Gallego went on to win the general election with 74.9% of the vote. He is the second Colombian American elected to the U.S. House, after Scott Perry.

==== 2016 ====
Gallego won the Democratic nomination unopposed and was reelected in 2016 with 75.3% of the vote.

==== 2018 ====
Facing a primary challenge from state senator Catherine Miranda, Gallego campaigned as the "real progressive" in the race. He won with approximately 74.8% of the vote, and was reelected in the general election with 85.6% of the vote.

==== 2020 ====
Considered a "rising progressive star" in the party, Gallego was encouraged by several progressive groups to run for Senate by challenging Mark Kelly in the Democratic primary. Although he expressed interest, he ultimately chose to seek reelection to his House seat, later endorsing Kelly.

Gallego won the Democratic nomination unopposed and was reelected to the House with 76.7% of the vote.

In 2019, Gallego served as the national chair of Eric Swalwell's presidential campaign. He endorsed Kamala Harris after Swalwell dropped out, and Joe Biden after Harris dropped out.

==== 2021 ====
In July 2021, it was reported that a corporate lobbying group called the U.S.–Qatar Business Council paid for a $22,000 trip to Qatar for Gallego and his wife, who is a lobbyist for the National Association of Realtors.

In the 117th United States Congress, Gallego voted in line with Joe Biden's stated position 100% of the time.

==== 2022 ====
In 2022, Gallego ran in the newly redrawn Arizona District 3 and was reelected with 77% of the vote. Gallego, a major critic of Senator Kyrsten Sinema, was encouraged by several progressive organizations to run against her in the 2024 election. He announced his candidacy on January 23, 2023.

=== Committee assignments ===
For the 118th Congress:

- Committee on Armed Services
  - Subcommittee on Intelligence and Special Operations (Ranking Member)
  - Subcommittee on Tactical Air and Land Forces
- Committee on Natural Resources
  - Subcommittee on Indian and Insular Affairs
  - Subcommittee on Oversight and Investigations
  - Subcommittee on Water, Wildlife and Fisheries

=== Caucus memberships ===
- Congressional Arts Caucus
- Congressional Hispanic Caucus
- Congressional Ukraine Caucus
- Congressional Progressive Caucus (until late 2023)
- Rare Disease Caucus
- Congressional Coalition on Adoption

== U.S. Senate ==
=== Elections ===
==== 2024 ====
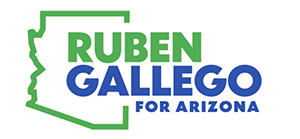
Gallego's Senate campaign logo

On January 22, 2023, Gallego announced his candidacy for the United States Senate in 2024. The seat was then held by Kyrsten Sinema, an independent who was first elected as a Democrat in 2018, and who angered members of the party due to her opposition to filibuster reform and some major Democratic legislation. After Gallego entered the race, and with Sinema not polling well, she chose not to run for reelection. Gallego had raised more money than Sinema in the first two quarters of 2023.

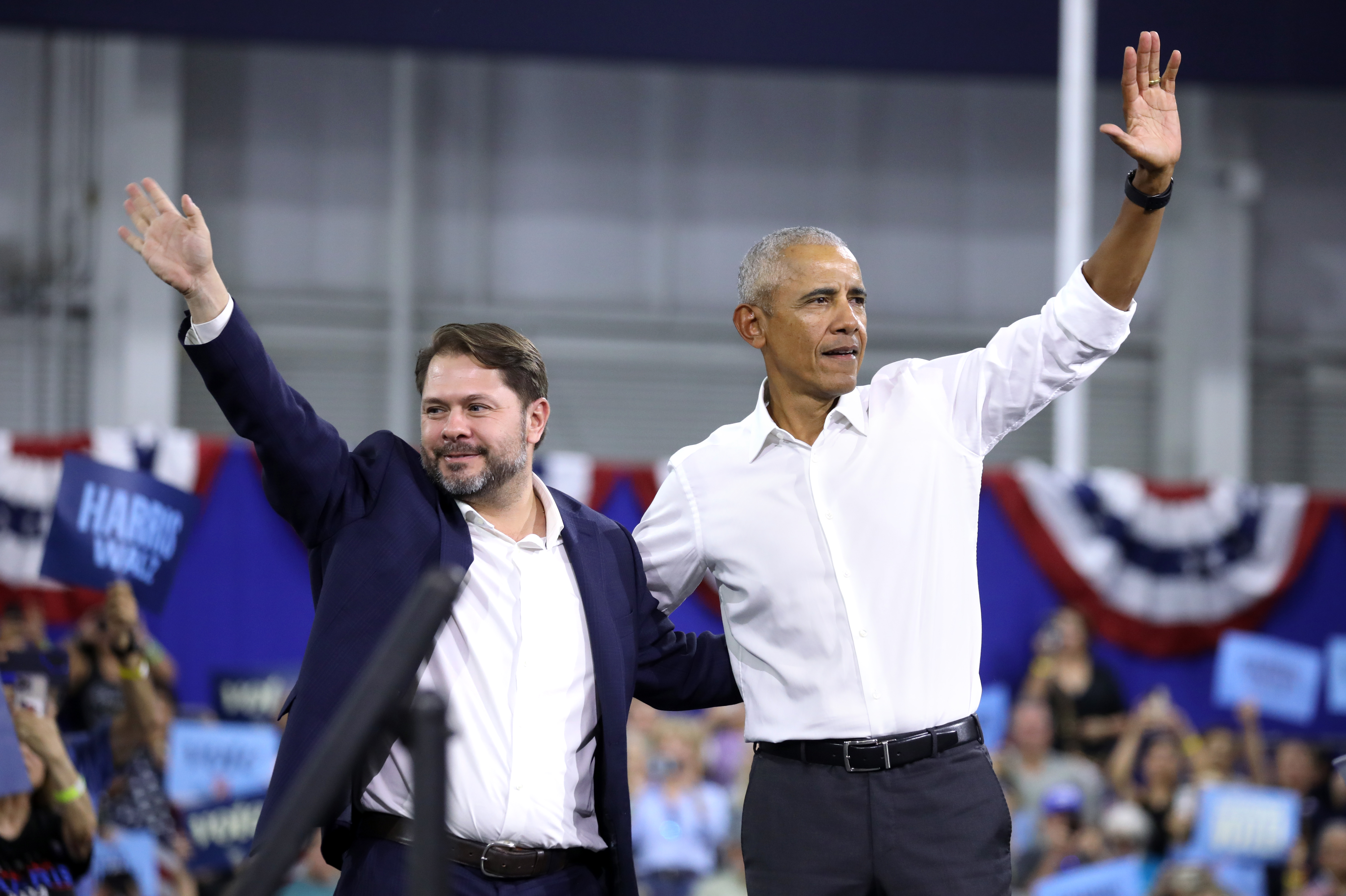
Gallego with Barack Obama

In 2022, Gallego bought a home near Capitol Hill using a special mortgage loan program for military veterans. He claimed the District of Columbia home as his primary residence although his campaign maintains that he resides in his Phoenix home. Gallego receives a homeowner rebate in Arizona that lowers the tax burdens for residents who primarily live in the state. Politico noted that Gallego "may have to explain why he declared he was primarily a resident of the nation's capital".

Although he had previously embraced his progressive background as "a fierce liberal combatant", he moved to the political center in his 2024 campaign to woo swing voters. He once called Donald Trump's border wall plans "stupid" and accused Trump of "scapegoating immigrants". His campaign emphasized his Marine Corps service and combat experience in Iraq, positioning him as a moderate voice on national security issues to appeal to independent voters. He distanced himself from progressive positions he had held in his House career, focusing instead on economic issues and border security. The New York Times wrote, "Gallego has built a reputation as a blunt-spoken liberal who is politically in tune with young progressives and lacerates his opponents with profane social media posts." Republicans in Arizona highlighted his co-sponsorship of the Medicare for All Act, his support for ending the Senate filibuster, and his suggestion to "take a scalpel" to military spending. In 2018, Gallego rallied alongside Bernie Sanders, and in 2022 he called himself "a true progressive voice in Congress". By 2024, he no longer embraced the label "progressive". He let his membership in the Congressional Progressive Caucus lapse, which he claimed was a financial decision.

On November 9, 2024, Decision Desk HQ projected that Gallego had beaten Lake in the Senate election in Arizona. On November 12, the Associated Press also projected that he had defeated Lake. Gallego significantly outperformed Kamala Harris, winning by 2.4% while Harris lost the 2024 United States presidential election in Arizona by 5.5%.

=== Tenure ===
In February 2025, Gallego used $9,161 from his leadership PAC to pay for a trip to Miami to celebrate his wife's birthday.

In summer 2025, Gallego participated in an official CODEL to Bogota, Colombia, during which, despite being notified by the U.S. embassy of a credible death threat against him, he partied at a nightclub until 3 a.m. and invited multiple female embassy staffers to join him.

In 2025, Gallego was one of 12 Senate Democrats who joined all Republicans to vote for the Laken Riley Act.

During the 2026 partial government shutdown, Gallego used several thousand dollars of campaign funds to travel with his wife to Saint Barthélemy.

In March 2026, Gallego became a prominent early endorser of Maine U.S. Senate candidate Graham Platner. Gallego's endorsement came the week after Platner had retweeted a post by a neo-Nazi influencer, and Gallego stood by Platner during previous controversies, including a Nazi Schutzstaffel tattoo and the discovery of old online comments that contained homophobic slurs and dismissed military sexual assaults. In July 2026, Gallego withdrew his endorsement of Platner following allegations of sexual assault.

=== Committee assignments ===
- Committee on Banking, Housing, and Urban Affairs
  - Subcommittee on Digital Assets (Ranking Member)
  - Subcommittee on Financial Institutions and Consumer Protection
  - Subcommittee on Housing, Transportation, and Community Development
- Committee on Energy and Natural Resources
  - Subcommittee on Energy (Ranking Member)
  - Subcommittee on National Parks
  - Subcommittee on Water and Power
- Committee on Homeland Security and Governmental Affairs
  - Permanent Subcommittee on Investigations
  - Subcommittee on Border Management, Federal Workforce, and Regulatory Affairs
- Committee on Veterans' Affairs

=== Caucus memberships ===
- Congressional Hispanic Caucus

=== Relationship with Eric Swalwell ===
In early 2026, Gallego came under scrutiny when Representative Eric Swalwell, who had been his roommate and described as his best friend, was accused of sexual assault. Gallego and Swalwell, who denied the allegations but resigned from Congress and ended his gubernatorial campaign, were viewed as unusually close. When the allegations, which included harassment, assault, rape, drugging, and inappropriate conduct involving staff or former staff, came to light, Gallego initially defended Swalwell before distancing himself.

The New York Times described Gallego's actions as supporting a "culture of silence" around sexual assault. Semafor described it as his first stress test. Gallego said that, with "100%" certainty, he had never blacked out, but acknowledged his "reputation" for late nights and drinking.

After the allegations against Swalwell, Representative Anna Paulina Luna accused Gallego of sexual misconduct. He met with the Senate Ethics Committee to defend himself and hired former Biden spokesperson Andrew Bates to deal with crisis communication from the fallout.

== Political positions ==
Gallego entered politics as a progressive in 2014, but since his 2024 Senate campaign, he has distanced himself from the "progressive" label and embraced a centrist platform. Gallego is a founding member of the centrist Majority Democrats PAC, along with Senators Elissa Slotkin and Michael Bennet. During his time in the House, he was a member of the Congressional Progressive Caucus.

=== Abortion ===
Gallego opposed the U.S. Supreme Court's 2022 ruling Dobbs v. Jackson Women's Health Organization, which upheld state abortion bans. He called for enshrining abortion rights in the Constitution of Arizona, which was implemented in 2024 through 2024 Arizona Proposition 139.

=== Filibuster ===
In May 2022, Gallego advocated breaking the Senate filibuster to pass gun control measures. He criticized Kyrsten Sinema's refusal to change the rule, saying, "Unless you are willing to break the filibuster to actually pass sensible gun control measures you might as well just say 'thoughts and prayers'".

=== Foreign policy ===
In February 2022, following the Russian invasion of Ukraine, Gallego joined Representative Eric Swalwell in calling for expelling Russian university students from the U.S., prompting criticism of these remarks as bigoted and xenophobic.

In August 2025, during the Gaza famine, Gallego opposed conditioning offensive military aid and blocking the sale of bombs and ammunition to Israel, but he later said his position was "evolving".

=== Gun policy ===
Gallego supported stronger gun control as of 2023. In May 2022, after the Uvalde school shooting in Texas, Gallego drew attention for his reply to Senator Ted Cruz after Cruz called gun control proposals an attempt to politicize the tragedy. Gallego wrote: "Fuck you @tedcruz you care about a fetus but you will let our children get slaughtered. Just get your ass to Cancun. You are useless."

=== Immigration ===
Opposed to the costs and skeptical of its efficacy, Gallego opposed the construction of the Mexico–United States border wall, calling it "stupid", "dumb", and "pointless" in 2017.

In 2025, Gallego co-sponsored the Laken Riley Act, saying he was breaking with his party because it was "largely out of touch" with the "average Latino". In February and March of that year, Gallego expressed support for deporting "dangerous" migrants to El Salvador and Guantánamo Bay and called Trump's deportations to the country a "political trap" for Democrats.

During the government shutdown of October 2025, Vice President JD Vance called for "revisiting" the Emergency Medical Treatment and Active Labor Act of 1986, which mandates that hospital emergency rooms provide care regardless of a patient's immigration status, claiming that many Americans had experienced emergency room visits where "illegal aliens" unable to speak English received care before citizens. In response, Gallego told Semafor, "We are open to passing laws that deny benefits, subsidies, or any assistance to individuals in the country illegally", but he raised concerns about the practical implications, saying that if emergency rooms were forced to turn away patients who couldn't provide identification, the people most likely to be denied care would be those who appear Latino or Asian.

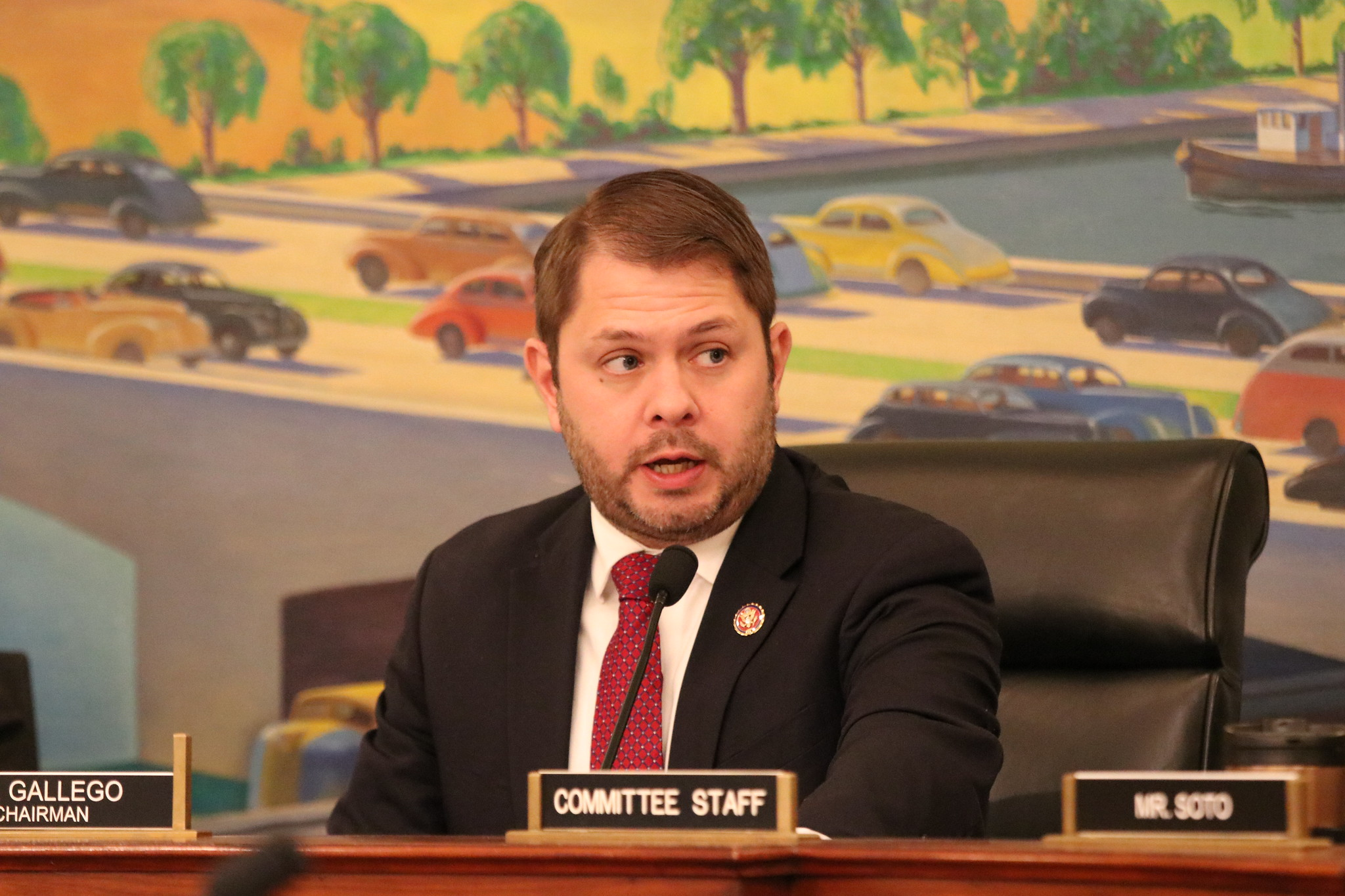
Gallego during a Natural Resources Committee meeting in 2020

In 2026, after Renée Good was killed by ICE agent Jonathan Ross on January 7 during Operation Metro Surge in Minneapolis, Gallego opposed abolishing ICE, comparing it to defunding the police. He said Americans "want a slimmed-down ICE that is truly focused on security". Just over two weeks later, federal immigration agents in Minneapolis fatally shot Alex Pretti. Gallego then announced he would vote against the upcoming Department of Homeland Security funding bill. After voting against the bill, he said in a statement, "I cannot vote to give ICE and Border Patrol more money to terrorize our communities until we see significant changes to how these agencies operate."

=== Native American social services ===
Gallego has sponsored or co-sponsored several bills funding social services for Native Americans. In September 2023, the House passed Gallego's bill, the Native American Child Protection Act, which aims to set up a National Indian Child Resource and Family Services Center to assist and train tribes, tribal organizations, and urban Indian organizations, and to forge state-tribe agreements to prevent, investigate, and prosecute family violence.

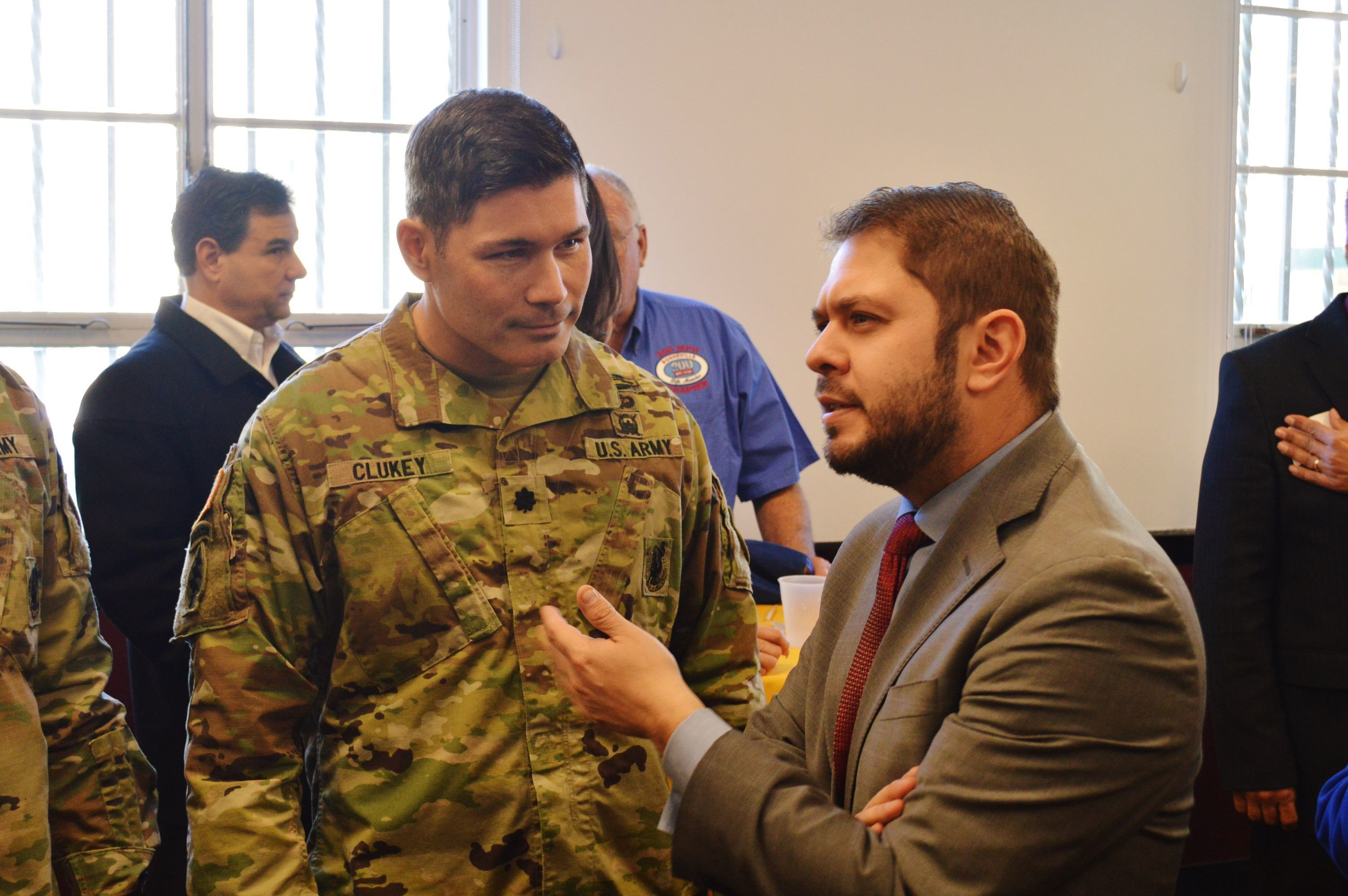
Gallego speaking to a U.S. Army officer in 2017

== Personal life ==
On August 7, 2008, Gallego changed his name from Ruben Marinelarena to Ruben Marinelarena Gallego to honor his mother, Elisa Gallego, who raised him and his three siblings on her own after his father abandoned the family in his childhood. In 2010, Gallego married Kate Widland Gallego, who was later elected mayor of Phoenix. They divorced in 2017 and have one child together.

Gallego married Sydney Barron in 2021. Barron is a lobbyist for the National Association of Realtors. Gallego and Barron have two children together.

In 2021, Gallego and Jim DeFelice wrote They Called Us "Lucky": The Life and Afterlife of the Iraq War's Hardest Hit Unit, a memoir of Gallego's service in the war as a member of the U.S. Marines Third Battalion, Twenty-Fifth Marine Regiment, Lima Company.

== Electoral history ==
=== 2010 ===
2010 Arizona House of Representatives Democratic primary, 16th district
Party	Candidate	Votes	%
Democratic	Ruben Gallego	4,149	26.12
Democratic	Catherine Miranda	3,476	21.88
Democratic	Cloves Campbell Jr. (incumbent)	3,182	20.03
Democratic	Jim Munoz Jr.	2,281	14.36
Democratic	Sandra Gonzales	1,955	12.31
Democratic	Cristy Lopez	842	5.30

2010 Arizona House of Representatives election, 16th district
Party	Candidate	Votes	%
Democratic	Catherine Miranda	19,197	39.46
Democratic	Ruben Gallego	18,365	37.75
Republican	Michael Gular	8,551	17.58
Green	Angel Torres	2,532	5.21

=== 2012 ===
2012 Arizona House of Representatives election, 27th district
Party	Candidate	Votes	%
Democratic	Catherine Miranda (incumbent)	28,683	40.98
Democratic	Ruben Gallego (incumbent)	27,522	39.32
Republican	Daniel Coleman	10,088	14.41
Green	Angel Torres	3,702	5.29

=== 2014 ===
2014 U.S. House Democratic primary, Arizona's 7th congressional district
Party	Candidate	Votes	%
Democratic	Ruben Gallego	14,936	48.90
Democratic	Mary Rose Wilcox	11,077	36.27
Democratic	Randy Camacho	2,330	7.63
Democratic	Jarrett Maupin	2,199	7.20

2014 U.S. House election, Arizona's 7th congressional district
Party	Candidate	Votes	%
Democratic	Ruben Gallego	54,235	74.85
Libertarian	Joe Cobb	10,715	14.79
Americans Elect	Rebecca DeWitt	3,858	5.32
Independent	José Peñalosa	3,496	4.83
Write-in		150	0.21

=== 2016 ===
2016 U.S. House election, Arizona's 7th congressional district
Party	Candidate	Votes	%
Democratic	Ruben Gallego (incumbent)	119,465	75.2
Republican	Eve Nunez	39,286	24.7
Write-in		60	< 0.01

=== 2018 ===
2018 U.S. House election, Arizona's 7th congressional district
Party	Candidate	Votes	%
Democratic	Ruben Gallego (incumbent)	113,044	85.6
Green	Gary Swing	18,706	14.1
Write-in		301	< 0.01

=== 2020 ===
2020 U.S. House election, Arizona's 7th congressional district
Party	Candidate	Votes	%
Democratic	Ruben Gallego (incumbent)	165,452	75.7%
Republican	Josh Barnett	50,226	23.3%
Write-in		54	0.0%
Total votes		215,732	100%
Democratic hold			

=== 2022 ===
2022 U.S. House election, Arizona's 3rd congressional district
Party	Candidate	Votes	%
Democratic	Ruben Gallego (incumbent)	108,599	77.0%
Republican	Jeff Zink	32,475	23.0%
Total votes		141,074	100%
Democratic hold			

=== 2024 ===
2024 United States Senate election in Arizona
Party	Candidate	Votes	%
Democratic	Ruben Gallego	1,676,335	50.1%
Republican	Kari Lake	1,595,761	47.7%
Green	Eduardo Heredia Quintana	75,868	2.3%
Write-in		850	0.0%
Total votes		3,348,814	100%
Democratic gain from Independent			

== See also ==
- List of Harvard University politicians
- List of Hispanic and Latino Americans in the United States Congress
- List of new members of the 119th United States Congress

U.S. House of Representatives
Preceded by Ed Pastor	Member of the U.S. House of Representatives from Arizona's 7th congressional district 2015–2023	Succeeded by Raúl Grijalva
Preceded by Raúl Grijalva	Member of the U.S. House of Representatives from Arizona's 3rd congressional district 2023–2025	Succeeded by Yassamin Ansari
Party political offices
Preceded by Kyrsten Sinema	Democratic nominee for U.S. Senator from Arizona (Class 1); 2024	Most recent
U.S. Senate
Preceded by Kyrsten Sinema	U.S. Senator (Class 1) from Arizona; 2025–present Served alongside: Mark Kelly	Incumbent
U.S. order of precedence (ceremonial)
Preceded by John Curtis	Order of precedence of the United States as United States Senator	Succeeded by Jim Justice
Preceded by Andy Kim	United States senators by seniority 87th	Succeeded by Jim Banks
