= United States House Natural Resources Subcommittee on Indian and Insular Affairs =

Subcommittee of Committee on Natural Resources
- Active United States House of Representatives; 119th Congress

Leadership
- Chair: Jeff Hurd (R)
- Ranking Member: Teresa Leger Fernandez (D)

Structure
- Seats: 11 (11 currently filled) 6/6 5/5
- Political parties: Majority (6): Republican (6); Minority (5): Democratic (5)

Meeting place
- 1328, Longworth House Office Building; Washington, D.C. 20515

Phone number
- (202)-226-9725

The United States House Natural Resources Subcommittee on Insular and Indian Affairs is one of the five subcommittees within the House Natural Resources Committee. It was known until the 118th Congress as the Subcommittee on Indigenous Peoples of the United States.

== Jurisdiction ==
1. Measures relating to the welfare of Native Americans, including management of Indian lands in general and special measures relating to claims which are paid out of Indian funds.
2. All matters regarding the relations of the United States with Native Americans and Native American tribes, including special oversight functions under House Rule X.
3. All matters regarding Native Alaskans.
4. All matters related to the Federal trust responsibility to Native Americans and the sovereignty of Native Americans.
5. General and continuing oversight and investigative authority over activities policies and programs within the jurisdiction of the Subcommittee.
6. All matters regarding insular areas of the United States.
7. All measures or matters regarding the Freely Associated States.
8. All matters regarding Native Hawaiians.

== Members, 119th Congress ==
Majority	Minority
Jeff Hurd, Colorado, Chair; Amata Coleman Radewagen, American Samoa, Vice Chair; Doug LaMalfa, California; Tim Walberg, Michigan; Addison McDowell, North Carolina; Mike Kennedy, Utah	Teresa Leger Fernandez, New Mexico, Ranking Member; Nydia Velázquez, New York (until c. November 2025); Val Hoyle, Oregon; Pablo Hernández Rivera, Puerto Rico; Emily Randall, Washington; Adelita Grijalva, Arizona (from November 19, 2025)
Ex officio
Bruce Westerman, Arkansas	Jared Huffman, California

== Historical membership rosters ==
=== 118th Congress ===
Majority	Minority
Harriet Hageman, Wyoming, Chair; Jenniffer González-Colón, Puerto Rico, Vice Chair; Amata Coleman Radewagen, American Samoa; Jerry Carl, Alabama; Doug LaMalfa, California; James Moylan, Guam	Teresa Leger Fernandez, New Mexico, Ranking Member; Gregorio Sablan, N. Mariana Islands; Ruben Gallego, Arizona; Nydia Velázquez, New York; Ed Case, Hawaii
Ex officio
Bruce Westerman, Arkansas	Raúl Grijalva, Arizona

=== 117th Congress ===
Majority	Minority
Teresa Leger Fernandez, New Mexico, Chair; Ruben Gallego, Arizona; Darren Soto, Florida; Betty McCollum, Minnesota; Michael San Nicolas, Guam; Ed Case, Hawaii; Alan Lowenthal, California; Chuy García, Illinois	Don Young, Alaska, Ranking Member (until March 18, 2022); Jay Obernolte, California, Vice Ranking Member; Amata Coleman Radewagen, American Samoa; Jerry Carl, Alabama; Matt Rosendale, Montana; Lauren Boebert, Colorado; Cliff Bentz, Oregon
Ex officio
Raúl Grijalva, Arizona	Bruce Westerman, Arkansas

=== 116th Congress ===
Majority	Minority
Ruben Gallego, Arizona, Chair; Darren Soto, Florida; Michael San Nicolas, Guam; Deb Haaland, New Mexico; Ed Case, Hawaii; Matt Cartwright, Pennsylvania	Paul Cook, California, Ranking Member; Don Young, Alaska; Amata Coleman Radewagen, American Samoa; John Curtis, Utah; Kevin Hern, Oklahoma
Ex officio
Raúl Grijalva, Arizona	Rob Bishop, Utah

=== 115th Congress ===
Majority	Minority
Doug LaMalfa, California, Chairman; Don Young, Alaska; Jeff Denham, California; Paul Cook, California; Amata Coleman Radewagen, American Samoa; Darin LaHood, Illinois; Jack Bergman, Michigan; Jenniffer Gonzalez, Puerto Rico, Vice Chair	Ruben Gallego, Arizona, Ranking Member; Madeleine Bordallo, Guam; Gregorio Sablan, Northern Mariana Islands; Darren Soto, Florida; Colleen Hanabusa, Hawaii; Nydia Velázquez, New York
Ex officio
Rob Bishop, Utah	Raúl Grijalva, Arizona
