= Jenniffer González-Colón =

Governor of Puerto Rico since 2025

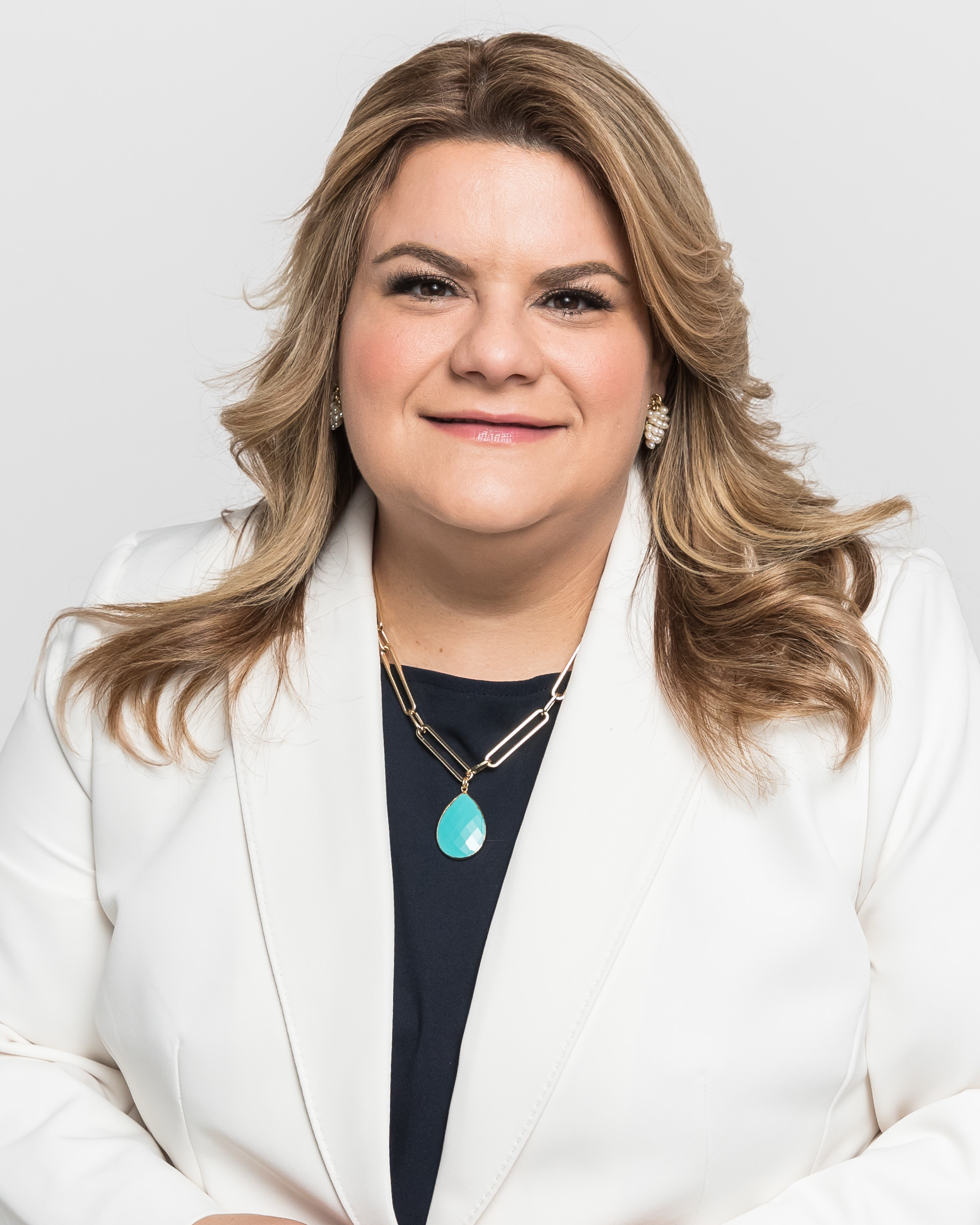
- González-Colón in 2025

Governor of Puerto Rico
- Incumbent
- Assumed office January 2, 2025
- Preceded by: Pedro Pierluisi

20th Resident Commissioner of Puerto Rico
- In office January 3, 2017 – January 2, 2025
- Preceded by: Pedro Pierluisi
- Succeeded by: Pablo Hernández Rivera

Chair of the Puerto Rico Republican Party
- In office November 15, 2015 – May 7, 2021
- Preceded by: Carlos Méndez
- Succeeded by: Ángel Cintrón

Minority Leader of the Puerto Rico House of Representatives
- In office January 12, 2013 – January 2, 2017
- Preceded by: Luis Raúl Torres
- Succeeded by: Tatito Hernández

29th Speaker of the Puerto Rico House of Representatives
- In office January 2, 2009 – January 2, 2013
- Preceded by: José Aponte Hernández
- Succeeded by: Jaime Perelló

Member of the Puerto Rico House of Representatives from the at-large district
- In office January 2, 2005 – January 2, 2017

Member of the Puerto Rico House of Representatives from the 4th district
- In office February 28, 2002 – January 2, 2005
- Preceded by: Edison Misla Aldarondo
- Succeeded by: Liza Fernández Rodríguez

Personal details
- Born: Jenniffer Aydin González Colón; August 5, 1976 (age 50) San Juan, Puerto Rico
- Party: New Progressive
- Other political affiliations: Republican
- Spouse: José Yovín Vargas Llavona (m. 2022)
- Children: 2
- Education: University of Puerto Rico, Río Piedras (BA); Interamerican University of Puerto Rico (JD, LLM)
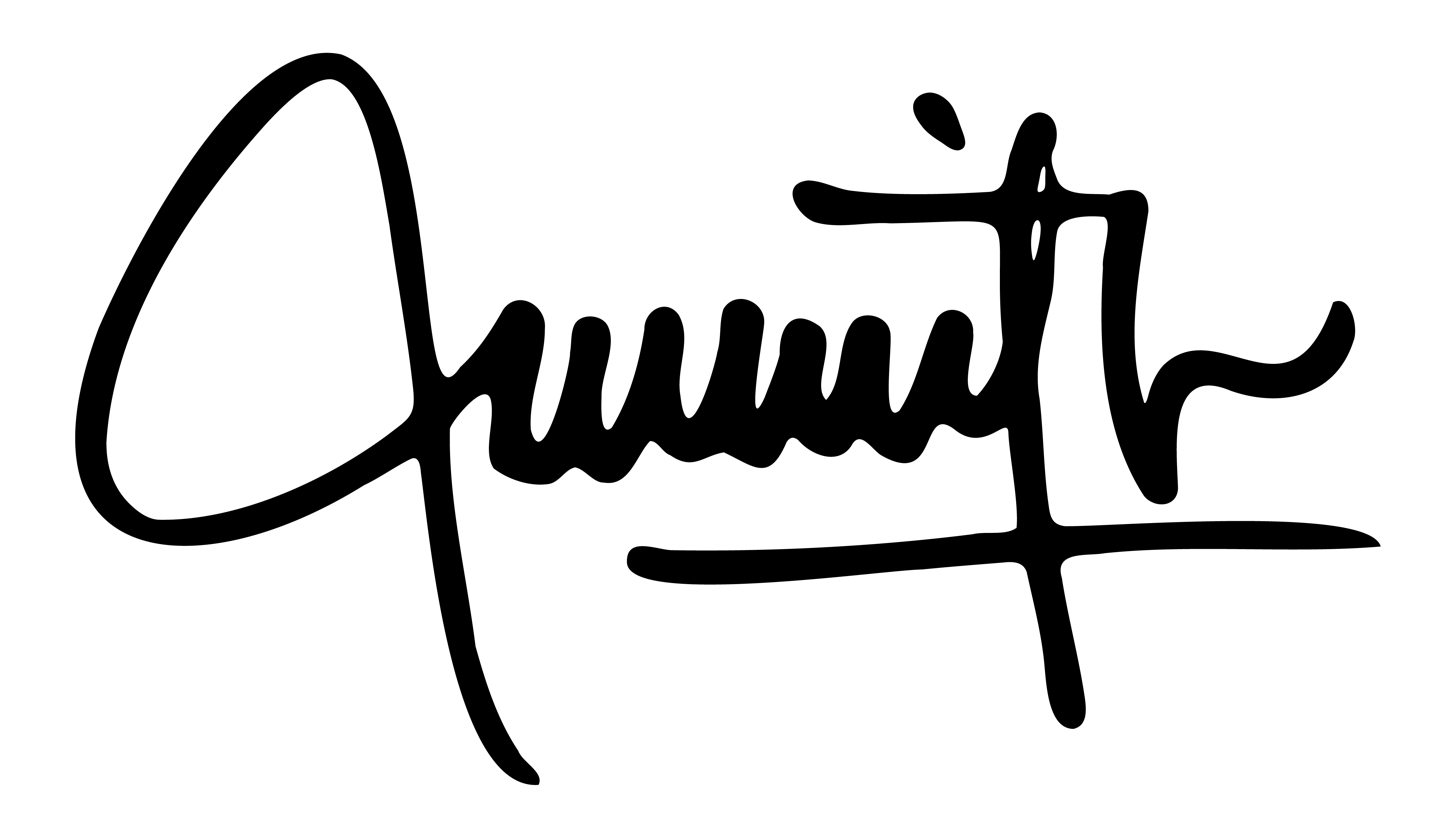
- Signature
- Website: jenniffer.com (in Spanish); Government website (in Spanish)
- González-Colón’s voice González-Colón speaks against calls for Puerto Rican independence and in favor of Puerto Rican statehood at the United Nations. Recorded June 23, 2023.

Jenniffer Aydin González Colón (born August 5, 1976), also colloquially known as JGo, is a Puerto Rican politician who is serving as the governor of Puerto Rico since 2025, having previously served as the 20th resident commissioner of Puerto Rico from 2017 to 2025.

She is the second elected and third serving female governor, after Sila María Calderón and Wanda Vázquez Garced, and she is also the first and only woman to be elected or serve as Resident Commissioner.

González Colón has also held leadership positions in the New Progressive Party of Puerto Rico (PNP) and the Republican Party of the United States, including being chair of the Puerto Rico Republican Party, speaker and minority leader of the House of Representatives of Puerto Rico, and vice-chair of the PNP.

== Early life and education ==
González was born in San Juan to the late Jorge González Santiago and Nydia Colón Zayas. Her father was a public school teacher from Naguabo, and her mother was a public sector administrator from Coamo. Her maternal grandmother María Aurora Zayas López was born in Coamo, and her paternal grandmother Engracia Santiago was born in Naguabo. She graduated from University Gardens High School and then received a bachelor's degree in political science from the University of Puerto Rico's Río Piedras campus. During these years she served as the executive director of the Young Republican Federation of Puerto Rico.

She obtained both a Juris Doctor and an LL.M. from the Interamerican University of Puerto Rico School of Law, but she has yet to be admitted to the bar of any jurisdiction.

== Early political career ==
=== Representative ===
González was first elected to the House of Representatives of Puerto Rico in a special election held on February 24, 2002, to fill the vacancy left by former House speaker Edison Misla Aldarondo, after his resignation as representative from San Juan's 4th District. She was the first female elected representative of San Juan's Fourth District, the youngest member of the 14th Legislative Assembly, and the youngest woman ever to be elected to the Puerto Rico Legislative Assembly. Before being elected as representative, González served as chairwoman of the San Juan New Progressive Party Youth Organization and was very active in the pro-statehood student movement while attending college.

González was re-elected in the 2004 Puerto Rico general elections, this time as an at-large representative. She served as chairwoman of the House Government Affairs Committee and as ranking member of the Budget, San Juan Development, Women's Affairs, and Internal Affairs Committees, as well as the Joint Commission for the Revision of the Civil Code of Puerto Rico.

=== Speaker of the House ===
González was re-elected to another term in the 2008 Puerto Rico general elections obtaining the most votes from her party, and the second most votes overall. At the age of 32, she was elected House speaker by members of her New Progressive Party delegation during a caucus held on November 7, 2008. González defeated incumbent House Speaker José Aponte Hernández in his bid for re-election to that post, becoming the youngest person in Puerto Rican history to be elected Speaker of the House, and the third woman to hold that seat.

=== Chairwoman of the Republican Party of Puerto Rico ===
In November 2015, González was unanimously elected as chairwoman of the Republican Party of Puerto Rico after being the party's vice-chair for eight years. She succeeded Aguadilla mayor Carlos Méndez in the position that once was held by former governor Don Luis A. Ferré, founder of the New Progressive Party, and Jose Celso Barbosa the founder of both the Republican Party and the statehood movement in Puerto Rico. During the 2020 Republican National Convention, she was unable to travel to the convention venue due to the fact that she was in self-quarantine after having tested positive to the novel coronavirus or COVID-19. She delegated her role of delegation chair at the 2020 convention in Kevin Romero, who became the youngest delegation chair and roll call participant in 2020. In September 2023, Jennifer González announced that she would run in the 2024 primary for the Puerto Rico gubernatorial elections.

=== House Minority Leader ===
In 2012, González was again re-elected, this time gathering the most votes overall, despite the fact that her party lost the majority of seats. The same night of the election, she was selected to become minority leader of her party.

== Resident Commissioner of Puerto Rico ==
=== Elections ===
==== 2016 ====
On September 14, 2015, González announced her candidacy to succeed Pedro Pierluisi as Resident Commissioner of Puerto Rico. Six days later, one of Pierluisi's rivals for the gubernatorial nomination, Ricardo Rosselló, agreed with her to become running mates for the June 5, 2016, primary and the November 8, 2016, general election. During the ten months the primary race lasted, various public opinion polls consistently showed González to have over 70% approval ratings of the electorate, making her the most popular politician of any political party on the island.

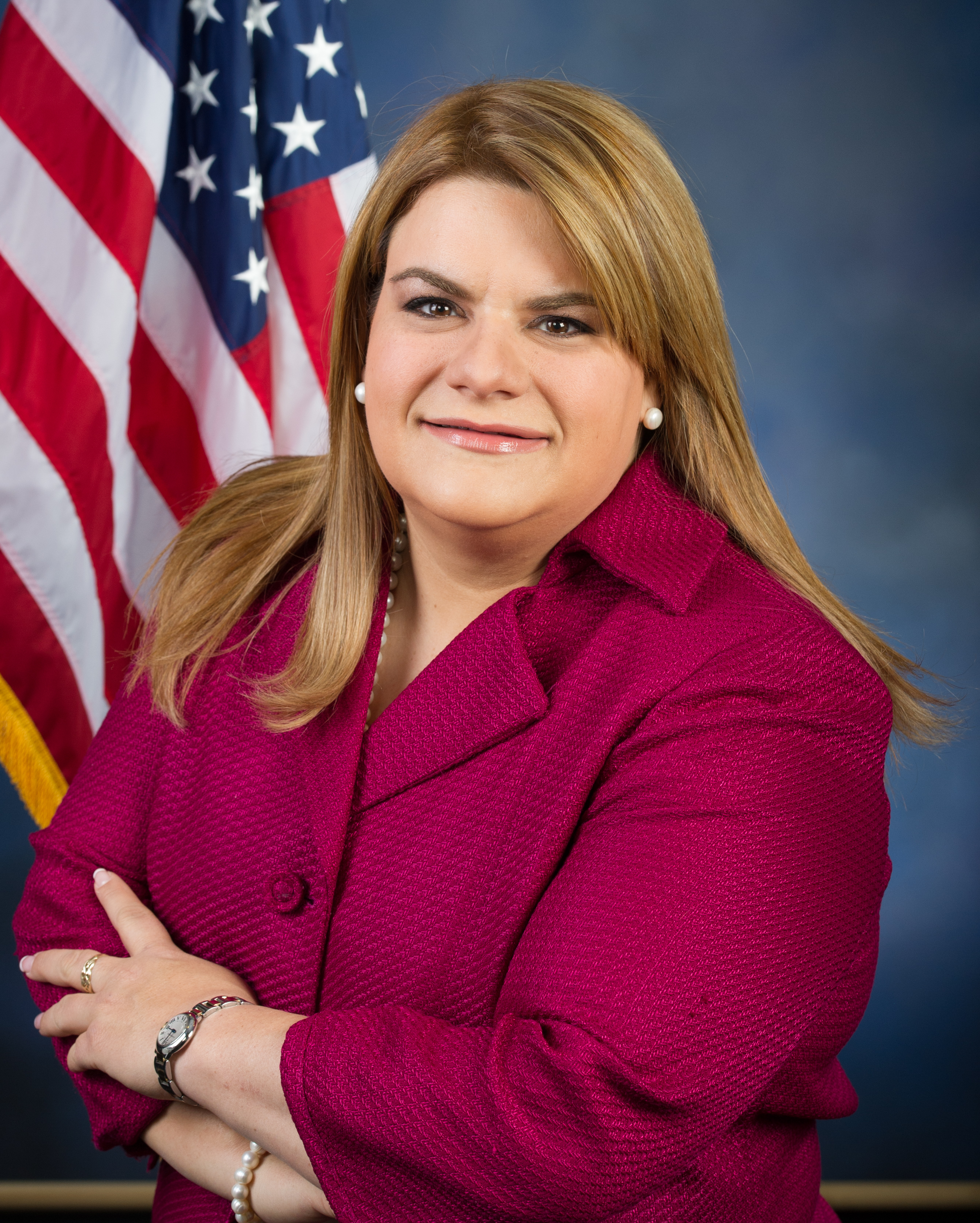
González-Colón's official portrait as resident commissioner, 2016

On June 5, 2016, González won the NPP primary by a landslide margin of 70.54% of the vote over her opponent Carlos Pesquera. She thus became the first woman in the history of the New Progressive Party to be nominated to the Resident Commissioner seat in Congress.

On November 8, 2016, González was elected Resident Commissioner of Puerto Rico, with 48.77% of the vote, over her main opponent, the late Héctor Ferrer of the Popular Democratic Party of Puerto Rico, becoming the first woman and youngest person to represent Puerto Rico in the U.S. Congress since the creation of the resident commissioner of Puerto Rico seat 116 years prior in 1900.

So far in her time in Congress, González has focused on sponsoring or cosponsoring bills related to veterans affairs, health relief and tax relief for Puerto Rico. Congresswoman González is a member of the Republican Conference House Policy Committee. She is also a member of the House Committees on Natural Resources, Veterans’ Affairs, and Small Business, vice chair of the Subcommittee on Indian, Insular, and Alaska Native Affairs, member of Subcommittee on Oversight and Investigations and co-chair of the Congressional Friends of Spain Caucus.

During her first two years in Congress, Rep. González Colón spent a great deal of time and effort on efforts related to hurricane recovery after Hurricanes Irma and María. This included participating in multiple House and Senate trips to Puerto Rico and joining the president on Air Force One during his 2017 official visit to view the hurricanes' damage to Puerto Rico.

For the 116th Congress, González has served in the Committee on Transportation and Infrastructure and the Committee on Natural Resources. Since 2019, she has continued focusing on disaster recovery issues. Her focus on disaster recovery for the island first began after hurricanes Irma and Maria in 2017, but continued through 2020, after an earthquake on January 7, 2020, struck and caused significant damage to the south and southeastern regions of Puerto Rico.

2016 Resident Commissioner to the United States House of Representatives election
Party	Candidate	Votes	%
New Progressive	Jenniffer González Colón	718,591	48.80
Popular Democratic	Héctor Ferrer Ríos	695,073	47.21
Independence	Hugo Rodríguez Díaz	39,704	2.70
Working People's Party of Puerto Rico	Mariana Nogales Molinelli	19,033	1.29
Total votes		1,472,401	100
New Progressive hold			

==== 2020 ====
2020 Resident Commissioner to the United States House of Representatives election
Party	Candidate	Votes	%
New Progressive	Jenniffer González Colón	512,697	41.14
Popular Democratic	Aníbal Acevedo Vilá	400,412	32.13
Citizens' Victory	Zayira Jordán Conde	157,679	12.65
Project Dignity	Ada Norah Henríquez	95,873	7.69
Independence	Luis Roberto Piñero	78,503	6.30
Write-in		928	0.07
Total votes		1,246,092	100
New Progressive hold			

=== Committee assignments ===
- Committee on Natural Resources (Vice Ranking Member for Insular Affairs)
  - Subcommittee on Indian, Insular, and Alaska Native Affairs
  - Subcommittee on Oversight and Investigations
- Committee on Small Business
  - Subcommittee on Economic Growth, Tax and Capital Access
  - Subcommittee on Health and Technology
- Committee on Veterans’ Affairs
  - Subcommittee on Health
  - Subcommittee on Oversight and Investigation

=== Caucus memberships ===
- Republican Main Street Partnership
- House Baltic Caucus
- Congressional Western Caucus
- Congressional Wildlife Refuge Caucus
- Climate Solutions Caucus
- Congressional HIV/AIDS Caucus (co-chair)
- Republican Governance Group
- Problem Solvers Caucus
- Rare Disease Caucus

== Governor of Puerto Rico ==
González Colón announced she would run for Governor of Puerto Rico and challenge incumbent Pedro Pierluisi in 2024. In an upset, she defeated him in the primary with 54.57% of the vote and became the first woman to run as the PNP's candidate in a gubernatorial election. On November 5, 2024, Jennifer Gonzalez won the office of Governor of Puerto Rico in the 2024 general election, with over 40% of the vote.

On January 2, 2025, González Colón was sworn into office as Governor of Puerto Rico, the second woman to be elected to the position and the third woman to serve.

On July 17, 2025, Gonzalez signed into law a bill barring hormone therapy or gender-affirming surgeries for transgender youth.

=== 2026 political crisis ===
In June 2026, the González administration became embroiled in a significant political controversy involving allegations of corruption, improper interference in government contracting, and political patronage centered on archiva staff, Francisco Domenech. On May 26, 2026, Sebastián Negrón Reichard resigned as Secretary of the Department of Economic Development and Commerce (DDEC). He subsequently filed a formal complaint alleging that Domenech had interfered with an internal investigation into bid rigging on a contract involving federal funds and had pressured agency staff to appoint or retain individuals aligned with the New Progressive Party (PNP) in trust positions.

Leaked text messages between Domenech and Negrón Reichard, made public in mid-June, appeared to show Domenech directing or pressuring Negrón Reichard regarding personnel decisions and actions related to clients of Politank, the lobbying firm Domenech previously led.

Domenech denied the allegations and filed sworn statements with the Puerto Rico Department of Justice and the Office of Government Ethics, accusing Negrón Reichard of corruption and conflicts of interest.

The scandal prompted a response from within González's own party. On June 19, 2026, Senate President Thomas Rivera Schatz introduced and passed Senate Resolution 548, launching a legislative investigation into the allegations against Domenech. Rivera Schatz publicly called for Domenech to resign, stating that he had become a "drag on the party."

Senators raised questions regarding whether Domenech may have made false statements under oath in earlier testimony concerning his communications with Politank clients. the controversy drew scrutiny from U.S. Congress, with some federal lawmakers expressing concern about the potential misuse of federal funds in Puerto Rico.

The crisis occurred as the González administration continued its efforts to cancel the contract with LUMA Energy, the private operator of Puerto Rico's power transmission and distribution system. Domenech and Energy Czar Josue Colón-Ortiz were both centrally involved in the legal and political push to terminate the agreement.

As of June 23, 2026, no criminal charges had been filed against Dominic, and investigations by the Office of Government Ethics, the Department of Justice, and the Puerto Rico Senate remained ongoing.

== Political positions ==
In The Hill's article The Hill's Latina Leaders to Watch, Resident Commissioner González is described as a pro-statehood, small government, pro-business conservative. In the first session of the 115th United States Congress, González was ranked the 19th most bipartisan member of the House by the Bipartisan Index, a metric published by The Lugar Center and Georgetown's McCourt School of Public Policy to assess congressional bipartisanship.

In 2019, González was one of three House Republicans, along with Brian Fitzpatrick and John Katko, to co-sponsor the Equality Act, which prohibits discrimination on the basis of sexual orientation and gender identity. Although González could not vote for final passage of the bill due to U.S. House rules, the legislation passed the United States House of Representatives during the 116th Congress.

After the 2021 United States Capitol attack, the congresswoman condemned the violence and blamed President Donald Trump for inciting the riot. However, the congresswoman still supported the majority of Republicans in their effort to remove Liz Cheney from her position as chair of House Republican Conference.

González said in a letter to U.S. President Donald Trump that Nicolás Maduro "is an open threat to the United States, our national security and stability in the region". Likewise, she has repeatedly affirmed her support for American expansionism, saying in 2025 that "the President's policy is to expand American territory, so he wants to add Canada and Greenland to that expansion. I have no problem with that, but I think it will be much easier to add to Puerto Rico because we have already voted, [...]," as well as "I don't care about the number, if it's 51, 52, 53, the important thing is that we add that star of Puerto Rico on the American flag".

=== Energy ===
As governor, González created a task force to evaluate Puerto Rico’s energy policy and identify alternatives to LUMA Energy, the primary electricity provider on the island. She appointed Josué Colón Ortiz as the Energy Czar and has said she wants to expand the use of liquefied natural gas, potentially revising renewable energy targets, while also backing policies that allow individual solar energy producers to sell excess power to the grid.

In December 2024, she stated her intent to replace LUMA with a different private operator. However, canceling the contract could lead to legal disputes, with estimated termination costs ranging from $300 million to $600 million. Reverting the system to the Puerto Rico Electric Power Authority (PREPA), which is in the process of being dismantled, could also cause service disruptions and require a transition period. Finding another private operator may present challenges, as potential candidates could demand higher compensation, and few companies may be willing to take on the responsibility.

González has been critical of LUMA, stating that requiring agencies to pursue legal action before proceeding with energy-related work “only delays these processes even further, does not provide electricity to any home or any industrial plant, and puts a risk to the funding.”

In May 2025, Jennifer Gonzalez Colón supported an investment project to install battery-powered solar systems in clinics and public housing in Puerto Rico.

== Personal life ==
On August 24, 2020, during the COVID-19 pandemic, González announced that she had tested positive for COVID-19.

In 2022, González announced she was dating then-medical student José Yovín Vargas Llavona, whom she had met the year before on holiday in La Parguera, in Lajas, Puerto Rico. Vargas is originally from Aguadilla, Puerto Rico. The couple married on August 6, 2022, at the Parroquia Santa Teresita in Santurce, Puerto Rico. The ceremony was attended by many political figures like Governor Pedro Pierluisi, as well as former governor Sila Calderón. On February 16, 2024, González gave birth to twins, a boy and a girl.

== See also ==
- History of women in Puerto Rico
- List of female governors in the United States
- List of Puerto Ricans
- List of Hispanic Americans in the United States Congress
- Women in the United States House of Representatives

Political offices
Preceded by José Aponte Hernández	Speaker of the Puerto Rico House of Representatives; 2009–2013	Succeeded by Jaime Perelló
House of Representatives of Puerto Rico
Preceded by Luis Raúl Torres	Minority Leader of the Puerto Rico House of Representatives; 2013–2017	Succeeded by Tatito Hernández
Party political offices
Preceded by Carlos Méndez	Chair of the Puerto Rico Republican Party; 2015–2021	Succeeded by Ángel Cintrón
Preceded by Pedro Pierluisi	Chair of the Puerto Rico New Progressive Party; 2024–present	Incumbent
Preceded by Pedro Pierluisi	New Progressive nominee for Governor of Puerto Rico; 2024	Most recent
U.S. House of Representatives
Preceded by Pedro Pierluisi	Resident Commissioner of Puerto Rico; 2017–2025	Succeeded by Pablo Hernández Rivera
Political offices
Preceded by Pedro Pierluisi	Governor of Puerto Rico; 2025–present	Incumbent
