= 2000 Arizona House of Representatives election =

- November 7, 2000

All 60 seats in the Arizona House 31 seats needed for a majority
	Majority party	Minority party
Leader	Jeff Groscost (retired)	Robert McLendon (retired)
Party	Republican	Democratic
Leader's seat	30th - Mesa	5th - Yuma
Last election	40	20
Seats after	36	24
Seat change	▼4	▲4
- Results: Democratic hold Democratic gain Republican hold Republican gain
Speaker before election
Jeff Groscost
Republican
Elected Speaker
Jim Weiers
Republican

The 2000 Arizona House of Representatives election took place on Tuesday, November 7, 2000, with the primary election held on Tuesday, September 12, 2000. Arizona voters elected all 60 members of the Arizona House of Representatives in multi-member districts to serve two-year terms.

The election coincided with United States national elections and Arizona state elections, including U.S. President, U.S. Senate, U.S. House, and Arizona Senate.

Following the previous election in 1998, Republicans held a 40-to-20-seat majority over Democrats. Republicans maintained control of the chamber in 2000, though their majority was reduced to 36 seats. At 24 members, Democrats saw a net gain of four seats. The newly elected members served in the 45th Arizona State Legislature, during which Republican Jim Weiers was elected as Speaker of the Arizona House. (Note: Jim Weiers was elected as Speaker for the 45th legislature by acclamation.)

== Retiring Incumbents ==
=== Democrats ===
1. District 5: Robert J. "Bob" McLendon
2. District 7: Harry R. Clark
3. District 7: Rebecca Rios
4. District 10: Ramón O. Valadez (Note: Elected to the Arizona State Senate.)
5. District 10: Sally Ann Gonzales (Note: Ran for the Arizona State Senate; lost to Ramón O. Valadez in the Democratic primary.)
6. District 13: Andy Nichols (Note: Elected to the Arizona State Senate.)
7. District 14: Herschella Horton (Note: Ran for the Arizona Corporation Commission; lost to Barbara Lubin in the Democratic primary.)

=== Republicans ===
1. District 2: John Verkamp (Note: Elected to the Arizona State Senate.)
2. District 2: Joe Hart (Note: Ran for the Arizona State Senate; lost to John Verkamp in the Republican primary.)
3. District 3: Tom Gordon
4. District 6: Lori S. Daniels (Note: Elected to the Arizona State Senate.)
5. District 6: Richard Kyle
6. District 8: Gail Griffin (Note: Ran for the Arizona State Senate; lost to Marsha Arzberger (D) in the general election.)
7. District 9: Bill McGibbon (Note: Ran for the Arizona State Senate; lost to Tim Bee in the Republican primary.)
8. District 9: Lou-Ann M. Preble
9. District 12: Dan H. Schottel
10. District 13: Kathleen Dunbar (Note: Ran for the Arizona State Senate; lost to Andy Nichols (D) in the general election.)
11. District 15: Jerry Overton (Note: Ran for the Arizona State Senate; lost to Edward Cirillo in the Republican primary.)
12. District 17: Robert "Bob" Burns
13. District 18: Barry Wong
14. District 18: Susan Gerard (Note: Elected to the Arizona State Senate.)
15. District 24: Tom Horne (Note: Ran for the Arizona State Senate; lost to Dean Martin in the Republican primary.)
16. District 29: Galen M. Updike (Note: Republican Representative Wayne L. Gardner resigned on Friday, June 2, 2000. Galen M. Updike (R) was appointed by the Maricopa County Board of Supervisors on June 6, 2000 to fill the unexpired term of Wayne L. Gardner (R). Representative Updike was sworn in as State Representative of District 29 on June 8, 2000.)
17. District 30: Jeff Groscost (Note: Ran for the Arizona State Senate; lost to Jay Blanchard (D) in the general election.)

== Incumbent Defeated in Primary Election ==
=== Republican ===
1. District 17: Jean McGrath

== Incumbents Defeated in General Elections ==
=== Republicans ===
1. District 1: Barbara Blewster
2. District 27: Mike Gardner

== Summary of results ==
Italics denote an open seat held by the incumbent party; bold text denotes a gain for a party.

District	Incumbent	Party	Elected Representative	Outcome
1st	Linda Binder	Rep	Linda Binder	Rep Hold
1st	Barbara Blewster	Rep	**Henry J. Camarot**	**Dem Gain**
2nd	John Verkamp	Rep	Tom O'Halleran	Rep Hold
2nd	Joe Hart	Rep	**James "Jim" Sedillo**	**Dem Gain**
3rd	Sylvia Laughter	Dem	Sylvia Laughter	Dem Hold
3rd	Tom Gordon	Rep	**Albert Tom**	**Dem Gain**
4th	Debra Brimhall	Rep	Debra Brimhall	Rep Hold
4th	Jake Flake	Rep	Jake Flake	Rep Hold
5th	Jim Carruthers	Rep	Jim Carruthers	Rep Hold
5th	Robert J. "Bob" McLendon	Dem	Robert Cannell	Dem Hold
6th	Lori S. Daniels	Rep	John Huppenthal	Rep Hold
6th	Richard Kyle	Rep	Bob Robson	Rep Hold
7th	Harry R. Clark	Dem	Mark Clark	Dem Hold
7th	Rebecca Rios	Dem	Cheryl Chase	Dem Hold
8th	Mark Maiorana	Dem	Mark Maiorana	Dem Hold
8th	Gail Griffin	Rep	**Bobby Lugo**	**Dem Gain**
9th	Bill McGibbon	Rep	Marian McClure	Rep Hold
9th	Lou-Ann M. Preble	Rep	Randy Graf	Rep Hold
10th	Ramón O. Valadez	Dem	Linda Lopez	Dem Hold
10th	Sally Ann Gonzales	Dem	Victor Soltero	Dem Hold
11th	Carmine Cardamone	Dem	Carmine Cardamone	Dem Hold
11th	Debora Norris	Dem	Debora Norris (Note: Democratic Representative Debora Norris resigned her Arizona House of Representatives seat on May 24, 2002, to run as a Congressional candidate in the newly redrawn Congressional District 1. Noemi Norris (D) was appointed by the Pima County Board of Supervisors on June 18, 2002 to fill the unexpired term of Debora Norris. Mrs. Noemi Norris was sworn in on July 1, 2002. Noemi Norris was the mother of Debora Norris.)	Dem Hold
12th	Steve Huffman	Rep	Steve Huffman	Rep Hold
12th	Dan H. Schottel	Rep	Pete Hershberger	Rep Hold
13th	Andy Nichols	Dem	Gabrielle "Gabby" Giffords	Dem Hold
13th	Kathleen Dunbar	Rep	Carol Somers	Rep Hold
14th	Marion L. Pickens	Dem	Marion L. Pickens	Dem Hold
14th	Herschella Horton	Dem	**Edward M. Poelstra**	**Rep Gain**
15th	Lowell "Mike" Gleason	Rep	Lowell "Mike" Gleason	Rep Hold
15th	Jerry Overton	Rep	Robert Blendu	Rep Hold
16th	Jim Weiers	Rep	Jim Weiers	Rep Hold
16th	Linda Gray	Rep	Linda Gray	Rep Hold
17th	Robert "Bob" Burns	Rep	John Nelson	Rep Hold
17th	Jean McGrath	Rep	Phil Hanson	Rep Hold
18th	Barry Wong	Rep	Deb Gullett	Rep Hold
18th	Susan Gerard	Rep	James Kraft	Rep Hold
19th	Roberta Voss	Rep	Roberta Voss	Rep Hold
19th	Ted Carpenter	Rep	Ted Carpenter	Rep Hold
20th	Kathi Foster	Dem	Kathi Foster	Dem Hold
20th	Bill Brotherton	Dem	Bill Brotherton	Dem Hold
21st	Marilyn Jarrett	Rep	Marilyn Jarrett (Note: Republican Representative Marilyn Jarrett was appointed by the Maricopa County Board of Supervisors on September 11, 2001 to fill the unexpired term of Senator Rusty Bowers (R) in District 21, who resigned his Senate seat on August 27, 2001. Mrs. Jarrett submitted her letter of resignation on September 12 and was sworn in as Senator on the same day. Gary L. Pierce (R) was appointed by the Maricopa County Board of Supervisors on September 24, 2001 to fill the unexpired term of Marilyn Jarrett (R), who resigned on 9/12 to assume the Senate seat from District 21. Mr. Pierce was sworn in as State Representative of District 21 on 9/24.)	Rep Hold
21st	Dean Cooley	Rep	Dean Cooley	Rep Hold
22nd	John A. Loredo	Dem	John A. Loredo	Dem Hold
22nd	Richard Miranda	Dem	Richard Miranda	Dem Hold
23rd	Leah Landrum	Dem	Leah Landrum	Dem Hold
23rd	Carlos Avelar	Dem	Carlos Avelar	Dem Hold
24th	Barbara Leff	Rep	Barbara Leff	Rep Hold
24th	Tom Horne	Rep	Stephen Tully	Rep Hold
25th	Ken Cheuvront	Dem	Ken Cheuvront	Dem Hold
25th	Christine Weason	Dem	Christine Weason	Dem Hold
26th	Jeff Hatch-Miller	Rep	Jeff Hatch-Miller	Rep Hold
26th	Steve May	Rep	Steve May	Rep Hold
27th	Laura Knaperek	Rep	Laura Knaperek	Rep Hold
27th	Mike Gardner	Rep	**Meg Burton Cahill**	**Dem Gain**
28th	Carolyn S. Allen	Rep	Carolyn S. Allen	Rep Hold
28th	Wes Marsh	Rep	Wes Marsh	Rep Hold
29th	Mark Anderson	Rep	Mark Anderson	Rep Hold
29th	Galen M. Updike	Rep	Russell Pearce	Rep Hold
30th	Karen S. Johnson	Rep	Karen S. Johnson	Rep Hold
30th	Jeff Groscost	Rep	Eddie Farnsworth	Rep Hold

== Detailed results ==
Sources for election results:

=== District 1 ===
Primary Election Results
Party	Candidate	Votes	%
Republican Party Primary Results
Republican	Linda Binder (incumbent)	14,223	32.87%
Republican	Barbara Blewster (incumbent)	11,951	27.62%
Republican	Lucy Mason	11,761	27.18%
Republican	Caleb Soptelean	5,330	12.32%
Total votes		43,265	100.00%
Democratic Party Primary Results
Democratic	Henry J. Camarot	6,144	100.00%
Total votes		6,144	100.00%

General Election Results
Party	Candidate	Votes	%
Republican	Linda Binder (incumbent)	45,109	40.68%
Democratic	Henry J. Camarot	34,830	31.41%
Republican	Barbara Blewster (incumbent)	30,958	27.92%
Total votes		110,897	100.00%
Republican hold			
Democratic gain from Republican			

=== District 2 ===
Primary Election Results
Party	Candidate	Votes	%
Republican Party Primary Results
Republican	Tom O'Halleran	8,006	53.85%
Republican	Margaret Roush-Meier	6,862	46.15%
Total votes		14,868	100.00%
Democratic Party Primary Results
Democratic	James "Jim" Sedillo	4,187	31.27%
Democratic	Josh Allen	3,614	26.99%
Democratic	Bill Cherry	3,299	24.64%
Democratic	Matthew Capalby	2,288	17.09%
Total votes		13,388	100.00%

General Election Results
Party	Candidate	Votes	%
Democratic	James "Jim" Sedillo	24,556	25.96%
Republican	Tom O'Halleran	24,212	25.60%
Republican	Margaret Roush-Meier	23,710	25.07%
Democratic	Josh Allen	22,096	23.36%
Total votes		94,574	100.00%
Democratic gain from Republican			
Republican hold			

=== District 3 ===
Primary Election Results
Party	Candidate	Votes	%
Democratic Party Primary Results
Democratic	Sylvia M. Laughter (incumbent)	9,988	51.39%
Democratic	Albert Tom	5,994	30.84%
Democratic	Ken "Ja Nez" Hallock	3,453	17.77%
Total votes		19,435	100.00%
Republican Party Primary Results
Republican	Caleb Roanhorse (Note: The candidate ran a write-in campaign.) (Note: Despite coming in first place in the Republican primary as a write-in candidate, Caleb Roanhorse did not advance to the general election.)	78	100.00%
Total votes		78	100.00%

General Election Results
Party	Candidate	Votes	%
Democratic	Sylvia M. Laughter (incumbent)	24,857	60.85%
Democratic	Albert Tom	15,990	39.15%
Total votes		40,847	100.00%
Democratic hold			
Democratic gain from Republican			

=== District 4 ===
Primary Election Results
Party	Candidate	Votes	%
Republican Party Primary Results
Republican	Jake Flake (incumbent)	6,989	51.99%
Republican	Debra Brimhall (incumbent)	6,454	48.01%
Total votes		13,443	100.00%
Democratic Party Primary Results
Democratic	M. Phil Martin	8,317	51.20%
Democratic	Claudia Maestas	7,927	48.80%
Total votes		16,244	100.00%

General Election Results
Party	Candidate	Votes	%
Republican	Jake Flake (incumbent)	26,806	30.27%
Republican	Debra Brimhall (incumbent)	23,836	26.92%
Democratic	Claudia Maestas	19,997	22.58%
Democratic	M. Phil Martin	17,908	20.22%
Total votes		88,547	100.00%
Republican hold			
Republican hold			

=== District 5 ===
Primary Election Results
Party	Candidate	Votes	%
Democratic Party Primary Results
Democratic	Robert Cannell	5,669	100.00%
Total votes		5,669	100.00%
Republican Party Primary Results
Republican	James R. "Jim" Carruthers (incumbent)	5,828	51.62%
Republican	Larry K. Nelson	5,463	48.38%
Total votes		11,291	100.00%

General Election Results
Party	Candidate	Votes	%
Democratic	Robert Cannell	17,724	37.93%
Republican	James R. "Jim" Carruthers (incumbent)	14,724	31.51%
Republican	Larry K. Nelson	14,286	30.57%
Total votes		46,734	100.00%
Democratic hold			
Republican hold			

=== District 6 ===
Primary Election Results
Party	Candidate	Votes	%
Republican Party Primary Results
Republican	John Huppenthal	9,194	45.85%
Republican	Bob Robson	5,130	25.58%
Republican	Glenna Twing	3,332	16.62%
Republican	Randy Clawson	2,395	11.94%
Total votes		20,051	100.00%
Democratic Party Primary Results
Democratic	Richard Wenzel	4,009	100.00%
Total votes		4,009	100.00%

General Election Results
Party	Candidate	Votes	%
Republican	John Huppenthal	36,172	38.27%
Republican	Bob Robson	31,328	33.14%
Democratic	Richard Wenzel	27,026	28.59%
Total votes		94,526	100.00%
Republican hold			
Republican hold			

=== District 7 ===
Primary Election Results
Party	Candidate	Votes	%
Democratic Party Primary Results
Democratic	Cheryl Chase	2,689	18.48%
Democratic	Mark Clark	2,503	17.21%
Democratic	Ernest Bustamante	2,411	16.57%
Democratic	Mary V. Thomas	1,949	13.40%
Democratic	Hugh Smith	1,632	11.22%
Democratic	Peter Villaverde	1,370	9.42%
Democratic	Thomas "Tommy " Morales, Jr.	1,195	8.21%
Democratic	William "Bill" Luck	799	5.49%
Total votes		14,548	100.00%
Republican Party Primary Results
Republican	Morris "Court" Courtright	2,708	55.18%
Republican	Juan A. Smith	2,200	44.82%
Total votes		4,908	100.00%
Libertarian Party Primary Results
Libertarian	Frank Aranda	36	100.00%
Total votes		36	100.00%

General Election Results
Party	Candidate	Votes	%
Democratic	Cheryl Chase	17,311	30.55%
Democratic	Mark Clark	15,412	27.20%
Republican	Morris "Court" Courtright	11,276	19.90%
Republican	Juan A. Smith	10,630	18.76%
Libertarian	Frank Aranda	2,041	3.60%
Total votes		56,670	100.00%
Democratic hold			
Democratic hold			

=== District 8 ===
Primary Election Results
Party	Candidate	Votes	%
Democratic Party Primary Results
Democratic	Bobby Lugo	5,910	30.38%
Democratic	Mark "Mark" Maiorana (incumbent)	5,097	26.20%
Democratic	Ruth Wilson	4,257	21.89%
Democratic	Michael Ames	4,187	21.53%
Total votes		19,451	100.00%
Republican Party Primary Results
Republican	Ben Anderson	4,288	58.82%
Republican	Howard Mendelsohn	3,002	41.18%
Total votes		7,290	100.00%

General Election Results
Party	Candidate	Votes	%
Democratic	Bobby Lugo	15,467	29.95%
Democratic	Mark "Mark" Maiorana (incumbent)	14,608	28.29%
Republican	Ben Anderson	12,096	23.43%
Republican	Howard Mendelsohn	9,464	18.33%
Total votes		51,635	100.00%
Democratic gain from Republican			
Democratic hold			

=== District 9 ===
Primary Election Results
Party	Candidate	Votes	%
Republican Party Primary Results
Republican	Marian McClure	5,357	26.24%
Republican	Randy Graf	4,765	23.34%
Republican	Mike Jenkins	4,071	19.94%
Republican	Parralee Schneider	3,816	18.69%
Republican	Kerry Clawson	2,406	11.79%
Total votes		20,415	100.00%
Democratic Party Primary Results
Democratic	Dave Bradley	6,486	100.00%
Total votes		6,486	100.00%
Green Party Primary Results
Green	William Crosby	34	100.00%
Total votes		34	100.00%

General Election Results
Party	Candidate	Votes	%
Republican	Marian McClure	31,880	34.45%
Republican	Randy Graf	29,431	31.80%
Democratic	Dave Bradley	25,821	27.90%
Green	William Crosby	5,407	5.84%
Total votes		92,539	100.00%
Republican hold			
Republican hold			

=== District 10 ===
Primary Election Results
Party	Candidate	Votes	%
Democratic Party Primary Results
Democratic	Victor Soltero	3,539	32.31%
Democratic	Linda Lopez	2,573	23.49%
Democratic	Jesse Lugo	2,058	18.79%
Democratic	Betty J. Liggins	1,295	11.82%
Democratic	Ralph Ellinwood	1,008	9.20%
Democratic	Emmett J. Alvarez	480	4.38%
Total votes		10,953	100.00%
Republican Party Primary Results
Republican	Judith D. Bennett (Note: The candidate withdrew from the election.)	1,312	100.00%
Total votes		1,312	100.00%
Green Party Primary Results
Green	Jack Strasburg	34	100.00%
Total votes		34	100.00%

General Election Results
Party	Candidate	Votes	%
Democratic	Linda Lopez	15,365	46.41%
Democratic	Victor Soltero	13,590	41.05%
Green	Jack Strasburg	4,155	12.55%
Total votes		33,110	100.00%
Democratic hold			
Democratic hold			

=== District 11 ===
Primary Election Results
Party	Candidate	Votes	%
Democratic Party Primary Results
Democratic	Debora Norris (incumbent)	4,289	28.29%
Democratic	Carmine Cardamone (incumbent)	3,746	24.71%
Democratic	Olivia Cajero Bedford	3,603	23.77%
Democratic	Val Romero	2,079	13.71%
Democratic	Louis L. Johnson	1,442	9.51%
Total votes		15,159	100.00%
Green Party Primary Results
Green	William Moeller	74	100.00%
Total votes		74	100.00%

General Election Results
Party	Candidate	Votes	%
Democratic	Debora Norris (incumbent)	19,926	46.22%
Democratic	Carmine Cardamone (incumbent)	17,334	40.21%
Green	William Moeller	5,850	13.57%
Total votes		43,110	100.00%
Democratic hold			
Democratic hold			

=== District 12 ===
Primary Election Results
Party	Candidate	Votes	%
Republican Party Primary Results
Republican	Pete Hershberger	7,292	42.45%
Republican	Steve Huffman (incumbent)	6,616	38.52%
Republican	Billie Jane Madden	3,268	19.03%
Total votes		17,176	100.00%
Democratic Party Primary Results
Democratic	Craig W. Molloy	5,476	59.87%
Democratic	Mort Nelson	3,670	40.13%
Total votes		9,146	100.00%

General Election Results
Party	Candidate	Votes	%
Republican	Pete Hershberger	37,982	31.21%
Republican	Steve Huffman (incumbent)	34,712	28.53%
Democratic	Craig W. Molloy	29,429	24.18%
Democratic	Mort Nelson	19,563	16.08%
Total votes		121,686	100.00%
Republican hold			
Republican hold			

=== District 13 ===
Primary Election Results
Party	Candidate	Votes	%
Democratic Party Primary Results
Democratic	Gabrielle "Gabby" Giffords	4,923	35.10%
Democratic	Ted Downing	4,478	31.92%
Democratic	Howard Shore	2,992	21.33%
Democratic	Colette Barajas	1,634	11.65%
Total votes		14,027	100.00%
Republican Party Primary Results
Republican	Carol Somers	5,897	50.51%
Republican	Jonathan Paton	5,778	49.49%
Total votes		11,675	100.00%

General Election Results
Party	Candidate	Votes	%
Democratic	Gabrielle "Gabby" Giffords	25,160	27.83%
Republican	Carol Somers	22,687	25.10%
Democratic	Ted Downing	21,684	23.99%
Republican	Jonathan Paton	20,869	23.09%
Total votes		90,400	100.00%
Democratic hold			
Republican hold			

=== District 14 ===
Primary Election Results
Party	Candidate	Votes	%
Democratic Party Primary Results
Democratic	Marion L. Pickens (incumbent)	5,013	57.83%
Democratic	Demitri Downing	3,655	42.17%
Total votes		8,668	100.00%
Republican Party Primary Results
Republican	Edward M. Poelstra	3,423	100.00%
Total votes		3,423	100.00%
Green Party Primary Results
Green	Mary "Katie" Bolger	80	100.00%
Total votes		80	100.00%

General Election Results
Party	Candidate	Votes	%
Democratic	Marion L. Pickens (incumbent)	19,704	31.97%
Republican	Edward M. Poelstra	16,608	26.95%
Democratic	Demitri Downing	16,416	26.63%
Green	Mary "Katie" Bolger	8,907	14.45%
Total votes		61,635	100.000%
Democratic hold			
Republican gain from Democratic			

=== District 15 ===
Primary Election Results
Party	Candidate	Votes	%
Republican Party Primary Results
Republican	Mike Gleason (incumbent)	6,777	26.74%
Republican	Robert Blendu	5,130	20.24%
Republican	Michael Johnson	4,646	18.33%
Republican	Michael Denea	4,491	17.72%
Republican	William "Bill" Arnold	4,278	16.88%
Republican	Richard Hopkins	21	0.08%
Total votes		25,343	100.00%
Democratic Party Primary Results
Democratic	Bunny Goldfarb	3,802	100.00%
Total votes		3,802	100.00%

General Election Results
Party	Candidate	Votes	%
Republican	Mike Gleason (incumbent)	34,817	37.81%
Republican	Robert Blendu	31,697	34.42%
Democratic	Bunny Goldfarb	25,144	27.31%
Nonpartisan	Sandy Reagan	425	0.46%
Total votes		92,083	100.00%
Republican hold			
Republican hold			

=== District 16 ===
Primary Election Results
Party	Candidate	Votes	%
Republican Party Primary Results
Republican	Linda Gray (incumbent)	3,718	51.96%
Republican	James Weiers (incumbent)	3,438	48.04%
Total votes		7,156	100.00%

General Election Results
Party	Candidate	Votes	%
Republican	Linda Gray (incumbent)	27,001	59.65%
Republican	James Weiers (incumbent)	18,263	40.35%
Total votes		45,264	100.00%
Republican hold			
Republican hold			

=== District 17 ===
Primary Election Results
Party	Candidate	Votes	%
Republican Party Primary Results
Republican	John Nelson	4,746	26.32%
Republican	Phil Hanson	4,665	25.87%
Republican	Jean McGrath (incumbent)	4,455	24.70%
Republican	Gertrude L. "Gertie" Hickman	4,167	23.11%
Total votes		18,033	100.00%
Democratic Party Primary Results
Democratic	Ken Thomas	2,707	56.73%
Democratic	Ruben Nicholas Madrid	2,065	43.27%
Total votes		4,772	100.00%

General Election Results
Party	Candidate	Votes	%
Republican	John Nelson	24,299	30.82%
Republican	Phil Hanson	23,323	29.58%
Democratic	Ken Thomas	17,097	21.68%
Democratic	Ruben Nicholas Madrid	14,132	17.92%
Total votes		78,851	100.00%
Republican hold			
Republican hold			

=== District 18 ===
Primary Election Results
Party	Candidate	Votes	%
Republican Party Primary Results
Republican	Deb Gullett	3,906	21.61%
Republican	James Kraft	2,903	16.06%
Republican	Wendy Marshall Hancock	2,609	14.43%
Republican	Joe Mikitish	2,543	14.07%
Republican	Ron Gawlitta	2,041	11.29%
Republican	Frank J. Conti	1,731	9.58%
Republican	Carol Turoff	1,699	9.40%
Republican	Tony Helm	465	2.57%
Republican	Melbalyn "Mel" Chatwin	179	0.99%
Total votes		18,076	100.00%
Democratic Party Primary Results
Democratic	Victoria Wold	2,610	100.00%
Total votes		2,610	100.00%

General Election Results
Party	Candidate	Votes	%
Republican	Deb Gullett	22,323	36.51%
Republican	James Kraft	20,036	32.77%
Democratic	Victoria Wold	18,789	30.73%
Total votes		61,148	100.00%
Republican hold			
Republican hold			

=== District 19 ===
Primary Election Results
Party	Candidate	Votes	%
Republican Party Primary Results
Republican	Roberta Voss (incumbent)	7,009	32.53%
Republican	Ted Carpenter (incumbent)	6,623	30.74%
Republican	Ephram Cordova	4,536	21.06%
Republican	Arlene Duston	3,375	15.67%
Total votes		21,543	100.00%

General Election Results
Party	Candidate	Votes	%
Republican	Roberta Voss (incumbent)	46,674	54.53%
Republican	Ted Carpenter (incumbent)	38,924	45.47%
Total votes		85,598	100.00%
Republican hold			
Republican hold			

=== District 20 ===
Primary Election Results
Party	Candidate	Votes	%
Democratic Party Primary Results
Democratic	Kathi Foster (incumbent)	1,607	53.30%
Democratic	Bill Brotherton (incumbent)	1,408	46.70%
Total votes		3,015	100.00%
Republican Party Primary Results
Republican	Bob Haran	1,865	100.00%
Total votes		1,865	100.00%

General Election Results
Party	Candidate	Votes	%
Democratic	Kathi Foster (incumbent)	11,933	39.94%
Democratic	Bill Brotherton (incumbent)	9,843	32.94%
Republican	Bob Haran	8,105	27.12%
Total votes		29,881	100.00%
Democratic hold			
Democratic hold			

=== District 21 ===
Primary Election Results
Party	Candidate	Votes	%
Republican Party Primary Results
Republican	Dean Cooley (incumbent)	8,069	38.08%
Republican	Marilyn Jarrett (incumbent)	7,973	37.63%
Republican	Linda A. Somo	5,146	24.29%
Total votes		21,188	100.00%

General Election Results
Party	Candidate	Votes	%
Republican	Dean Cooley (incumbent)	35,939	53.19%
Republican	Marilyn Jarrett (incumbent)	31,632	46.81%
Total votes		67,571	100.00%
Republican hold			
Republican hold			

=== District 22 ===
Primary Election Results
Party	Candidate	Votes	%
Democratic Party Primary Results
Democratic	Richard Miranda (incumbent)	1,824	61.83%
Democratic	John A. Loredo (incumbent)	1,126	38.17%
Total votes		2,950	100.00%
Republican Party Primary Results
Republican	John Atkins	907	100.00%
Total votes		907	100.00%

General Election Results
Party	Candidate	Votes	%
Democratic	Richard Miranda (incumbent)	9,279	43.91%
Democratic	John A. Loredo (incumbent)	7,361	34.83%
Republican	John Atkins	4,494	21.26%
Total votes		21,134	100.00%
Democratic hold			
Democratic hold			

=== District 23 ===
Primary Election Results
Party	Candidate	Votes	%
Democratic Party Primary Results
Democratic	Leah Landrum (incumbent)	2,116	41.85%
Democratic	Carlos Avelar (incumbent)	1,715	33.92%
Democratic	Augusta Nelson-Knight	1,225	24.23%
Total votes		5,056	100.00%

General Election Results
Party	Candidate	Votes	%
Democratic	Leah Landrum (incumbent)	10,054	46.12%
Democratic	Carlos Avelar (incumbent)	9,589	43.98%
Independent	William (Billy) Norris	2,158	9.90%
Total votes		21,801	100.00%
Democratic hold			
Democratic hold			

=== District 24 ===
Primary Election Results
Party	Candidate	Votes	%
Republican Party Primary Results
Republican	Barbara Leff (incumbent)	6,744	39.66%
Republican	Stephen Tully	4,003	23.54%
Republican	Pam Miller	3,740	22.00%
Republican	Joseph A. Hudock	2,516	14.80%
Total votes		17,003	100.00%
Democratic Party Primary Results
Democratic	Laurie Larson	2,428	100.00%
Total votes		2,428	100.00%
Libertarian Party Primary Results
Libertarian	Tim McDermott	64	100.00%
Total votes		64	100.00%

General Election Results
Party	Candidate	Votes	%
Republican	Barbara Leff (incumbent)	32,533	37.52%
Republican	Stephen Tully	26,793	30.90%
Democratic	Laurie Larson	21,846	25.20%
Libertarian	Tim McDermott	5,532	6.38%
Total votes		86,704	100.00%
Republican hold			
Republican hold			

=== District 25 ===
Primary Election Results
Party	Candidate	Votes	%
Democratic Party Primary Results
Democratic	Ken Cheuvront (incumbent)	3,183	51.52%
Democratic	Christine Weason (incumbent)	2,995	48.48%
Total votes		6,178	100.00%
Republican Party Primary Results
Republican	Milton Wheat	4,246	96.87%
Republican	Mary Koestner (Note: Despite coming in second place in the Republican primary as a write-in candidate, Mary Koestner did not advance to the general election.)	137	3.13%
Total votes		4,383	100.00%
Libertarian Party Primary Results
Libertarian	Mike Renzulli	58	100.00%
Total votes		58	100.00%
Green Party Primary Results
Green	John Scudder	13	100.00%
Total votes		13	100.00%

General Election Results
Party	Candidate	Votes	%
Democratic	Christine Weason (incumbent)	17,585	35.06%
Democratic	Ken Cheuvront (incumbent)	16,953	33.80%
Republican	Milton Wheat	12,453	24.83%
Green	John Scudder	3,168	6.32%
Total votes		50,159	100.00%
Democratic hold			
Democratic hold			

=== District 26 ===
Primary Election Results
Party	Candidate	Votes	%
Republican Party Primary Results
Republican	Jeff Hatch-Miller (incumbent)	7,772	51.23%
Republican	Steve May (incumbent)	7,400	48.77%
Total votes		15,172	100.00%
Democratic Party Primary Results
Democratic	Joan M. Fitz-Randolph	3,812	100.00%
Total votes		3,812	100.00%
Green Party Primary Results
Green	Eli Manders	19	100.00%
Total votes		19	100.00%

General Election Results
Party	Candidate	Votes	%
Republican	Jeff Hatch-Miller (incumbent)	23,313	31.38%
Republican	Steve May (incumbent)	23,082	31.06%
Democratic	Joan M. Fitz-Randolph	18,806	25.31%
Independent	Sean Nottingham	5,524	7.43%
Green	Eli Manders	3,578	4.82%
Total votes		74,303	100.00%
Republican hold			
Republican hold			

=== District 27 ===
Primary Election Results
Party	Candidate	Votes	%
Republican Party Primary Results
Republican	Mike Gardner (incumbent)	7,077	50.71%
Republican	Laura Knaperek (incumbent)	6,878	49.29%
Total votes		13,955	100.00%
Democratic Party Primary Results
Democratic	Meg Burton Cahill	2,759	100.00%
Total votes		2,759	100.00%

General Election Results
Party	Candidate	Votes	%
Republican	Laura Knaperek (incumbent)	23,825	35.28%
Democratic	Meg Burton Cahill	21,911	32.44%
Republican	Mike Gardner (incumbent)	21,804	32.28%
Total votes		67,540	100.00%
Republican hold			
Democratic gain from Republican			

=== District 28 ===
Primary Election Results
Party	Candidate	Votes	%
Republican Party Primary Results
Republican	Carolyn S. Allen (incumbent)	11,288	34.60%
Republican	Wes Marsh (incumbent)	10,686	32.76%
Republican	John Allen	6,518	19.98%
Republican	Astria Wong Savarese	4,131	12.66%
Total votes		32,623	100.00%
Democratic Party Primary Results
Democratic	Ginny Chin	4,570	100.00%
Total votes		4,570	100.00%

General Election Results
Party	Candidate	Votes	%
Republican	Carolyn S. Allen (incumbent)	51,318	39.14%
Republican	Wes Marsh (incumbent)	42,872	32.70%
Democratic	Ginny Chin	36,937	28.17%
Total votes		131,127	100.00%
Republican hold			
Republican hold			

=== District 29 ===
Primary Election Results
Party	Candidate	Votes	%
Republican Party Primary Results
Republican	Mark Anderson (incumbent)	5,425	40.98%
Republican	Russell Pearce	4,898	37.00%
Republican	Carma Lee Ellingson	2,915	22.02%
Total votes		13,238	100.00%

General Election Results
Party	Candidate	Votes	%
Republican	Mark Anderson (incumbent)	19,605	56.56%
Republican	Russell Pearce	15,055	43.44%
Total votes		34,660	100.00%
Republican hold			
Republican hold			

=== District 30 ===
Primary Election Results
Party	Candidate	Votes	%
Republican Party Primary Results
Republican	Eddie Farnsworth	9,773	37.50%
Republican	Karen S. Johnson (incumbent)	8,973	34.43%
Republican	Myrna Sheppard	7,317	28.07%
Total votes		26,063	100.00%
Democratic Party Primary Results
Democratic	Eileen Fellner	3,014	57.98%
Democratic	Linda K. Tongé	2,184	42.02%
Total votes		5,198	100.00%

General Election Results
Party	Candidate	Votes	%
Republican	Eddie Farnsworth	45,473	33.41%
Republican	Karen S. Johnson (incumbent)	41,191	30.26%
Democratic	Eileen Fellner	28,807	21.16%
Democratic	Linda K. Tongé	20,655	15.17%
Total votes		136,126	100.00%
Republican hold			
Republican hold			

== See also ==
- 2000 United States elections
- 2000 United States presidential election in Arizona
- 2000 United States Senate election in Arizona
- 2000 United States House of Representatives elections in Arizona
- 2000 Arizona Senate election
- 45th Arizona State Legislature
- Arizona House of Representatives
