= 45th Arizona State Legislature =

Session of the Arizona Legislature

| ← | 44th | 46th | → |
- Arizona State Capitol (2014)

Overview
- Legislative body: Arizona State Legislature
- Jurisdiction: Arizona, United States
- Term: January 1, 2001 – December 31, 2002

Senate
- Members: 30
- President: Randall Gnant
- Temporary President: Member rotation
- Party control: Neither (15–15)

House of Representatives
- Members: 60
- Speaker: Jim Weiers
- Party control: Republican (36–24)

Sessions
- 1st: January 8 – May 10, 2001
- 2nd: January 14 – May 23, 2002

Special sessions
- 1st: September 24 – September 26, 2001
- 2nd: November 13 – December 19, 2001
- 3rd: February 4 – March 20, 2002
- 4th: April 1 – May 23, 2002
- 5th: July 30 – August 1, 2002
- 6th: November 25 – November 25, 2002

The 45th Arizona State Legislature, consisting of the Arizona State Senate and the Arizona House of Representatives, was constituted in Phoenix from January 1, 2001, to December 31, 2002, during the final two years of Jane Dee Hull's first full term in office. Both the Senate and the House membership remained constant at 30 and 60, respectively. The Republicans lost a seat in the Senate, creating a 15-15 balance with the Democrats. The Republicans lost four seats in the House, maintaining their majority in the lower chamber, 36–24.

== Sessions ==
The Legislature met for two regular sessions at the State Capitol in Phoenix. The first opened on January 8, 2001, and adjourned on May 10, while the Second Regular Session convened on January 14, 2002, and adjourned sine die on May 23.

There were six Special Sessions, the first of which was convened on September 24, 2001, and adjourned on September 26; the second convened on November 13, 2001, and adjourned sine die on December 19; the third convened on February 4, 2002, and adjourned sine die March 20; the fourth convened on April 1, 2002, and adjourned sine die on May 23; the fifth convened on July 30, 2002, and adjourned sine die August 1; the sixth and final special session convened and adjourned on November 25, 2002.

== State Senate ==
=== Members ===
The asterisk (*) denotes members of the previous Legislature who continued in office as members of this Legislature.

| District | Senator | Party | Notes |
|---|---|---|---|
| 1 | Ken Bennett* | Republican | |
| 2 | John Verkamp | Republican | |
| 3 | Jack C. Jackson* | Democrat | |
| 4 | Jack A. Brown* | Democrat | |
| 5 | Herb Guenther* | Democrat | |
| 6 | Lori S. Daniels | Republican | |
| 7 | Pete Rios* | Democrat | |
| 8 | Marsha Arzberger | Democrat | |
| 9 | Timothy S. Bee | Republican | |
| 10 | Ramon Valadez | Democrat | |
| 11 | Elaine Richardson | Democrat | |
| 12 | Toni Hellon | Republican | |
| 13 | Virginia Yrun | Democrat | Was appointed April 26, 2001 to replace Andy Nichols |
| 13 | Andy Nichols | Democrat | Died in office on April 19, 2001 |
| 14 | Ruth Solomon* | Democrat | |
| 15 | Edward Cirillo* | Republican | |
| 16 | Darden C. Hamilton* | Republican | |
| 17 | Brenda Burns* | Republican | |
| 18 | Susan Gerard | Republican | |
| 19 | Scott Bundgaard* | Republican | |
| 20 | Mary Hartley* | Democrat | |
| 21 | Marilyn Jarrett | Republican | |
| 22 | Joe Eddie Lopez* | Democrat | |
| 23 | Linda Aguirre* | Democrat | |
| 24 | Dean Martin | Republican | |
| 25 | Chris Cummiskey* | Democrat | |
| 26 | Tom Smith* | Republican | |
| 27 | Harry E. Mitchell* | Democrat | |
| 28 | Randall Gnant* | Republican | |
| 29 | David Peterson* | Republican | |
| 30 | Jay Blanchard | Democrat | |

== House of Representatives ==
=== Members ===
The asterisk (*) denotes members of the previous Legislature who continued in office as members of this Legislature.

| District | Representative | Party | Notes |
|---|---|---|---|
| 1 | Linda Binder* | Republican | |
| 1 | Henry Camarot | Democrat | |
| 2 | Tom O'Halleran | Republican | |
| 2 | James Sedillo | Democrat | |
| 3 | Sylvia Laughter* | Democrat | |
| 3 | Albert Tom | Democrat | |
| 4 | Debra Brimhall* | Republican | |
| 4 | Jake Flake* | Republican | |
| 5 | Robert Cannell | Republican | |
| 5 | Jim Carruthers* | Democrat | |
| 6 | John Huppenthal | Republican | |
| 6 | Bob Robson | Republican | |
| 7 | Cheryl Chase | Democrat | |
| 7 | Mark A. Clark | Democrat | |
| 8 | Bobby Lugo | Democrat | |
| 8 | Mark Maiorana* | Democrat | |
| 9 | Randy Graf | Republican | |
| 9 | Marian McClure | Republican | |
| 10 | Linda J. Lopez | Democrat | |
| 10 | Victor Soltero | Democrat | |
| 11 | Carmine Cardamone* | Democrat | |
| 11 | Debora Norris* | Democrat | |
| 12 | Steve Huffman | Republican | |
| 12 | Dan Shottel* | Republican | |
| 13 | Gabrielle Giffords | Democrat | |
| 13 | Carol Somers | Republican | |
| 14 | Mary Pickens* | Democrat | |
| 14 | Edward Poelstra | Republican | |
| 15 | Robert Blendu | Republican | |
| 15 | Mike Gleason* | Republican | |
| 16 | Linda Gray* | Republican | |
| 16 | James Weiers* | Republican | |
| 17 | Phil Hanson | Republican | |
| 17 | John Nelson | Republican | |
| 18 | Deb Gullett | Republican | |
| 18 | James Kraft | Republican | |
| 19 | Ted Carpenter* | Republican | |
| 19 | Roberta Voss* | Republican | |
| 20 | Bill Brotherton* | Democrat | |
| 20 | Kathi Foster* | Democrat | |
| 21 | Dean Cooley* | Republican | |
| 21 | Gary Pierce* | Republican | |
| 22 | John Loredo* | Democrat | |
| 22 | Richard Miranda* | Democrat | |
| 23 | Carlos Avelar* | Democrat | |
| 23 | Leah Landrum Taylor* | Democrat | |
| 24 | Barbara Leff* | Republican | |
| 24 | Stephen Tully | Republican | |
| 25 | Ken Cheuvront* | Democrat | |
| 25 | Christine Weason* | Democrat | |
| 26 | Jeff Hatch-Miller* | Republican | |
| 26 | Steve May* | Republican | |
| 27 | Meg Burton Cahill | Democrat | |
| 27 | Laura Knaperek* | Republican | |
| 28 | Carolyn Allen* | Republican | |
| 28 | Wesley Marsh* | Republican | |
| 29 | Mark Anderson* | Republican | |
| 29 | Russell Pearce | Republican | |
| 30 | Eddie Farnsworth | Republican | |
| 30 | Karen S. Johnson* | Republican | |
