= Macario Saldate =

American politician

Member of the Arizona House of Representatives from the 3rd district
- In office January 14, 2013 – January 14, 2019 Serving with Sally Ann Gonzales
- Succeeded by: Alma Hernandez

Member of the Arizona House of Representatives from the 27th district
- In office January 10, 2011 – January 14, 2013 Serving with Sally Ann Gonzales
- Preceded by: David Bradley

Personal details
- Born: December 13, 1941 (age 84)
- Party: Democratic
- Education: University of Arizona
- Profession: Retired

Macario Saldate IV (born December 13, 1941) is an American politician and a former Democratic member of the Arizona House of Representatives representing District 3 from 2013 to 2019.

Saldate previously served consecutively from January 10, 2011, until January 14, 2013, in the District 27 seat.

== Education ==
Saldate earned his BA, MA degrees, and EdD from the University of Arizona.

== Elections ==
- 2014 Saldate and Gonzales were unopposed in the general election.
- 2012 Redistricted to District 3, and with incumbent Republican Representatives Nancy McLain running for Arizona Senate and Doris Goodale redistricted to District 5, Saldate and Sally Ann Gonzales were both unopposed in both the August 28, 2012 Democratic Primary, where Gonzales placed first and Saldate placed second with 9,605 votes; and the November 6, 2012 General election, where Gonzales placed first and Saldate placed second with 30,662 votes.
- 2010 With incumbent Democratic Representative Olivia Cajero Bedford running for Arizona Senate and Phil Lopes retiring, Saldate ran in the eight-way August 24, 2010 Democratic Primary, placing second behind Sally Ann Gonzales with 3,504 votes; in the five-way November 2, 2010 General election, Gonzales took the first seat, and Saldate took the second seat with 22,791 votes against Republican nominee Robert Compton, Green candidate Kent Solberg (who had run for the seat in 2008), and independent candidate Gene Chewning (who had run for the seat in 2006).
