= Linda Binder =

American politician

Member of the Arizona Senate from the 3rd district
- In office January 2003 – January 2005
- Preceded by: Jack Jackson Sr.
- Succeeded by: Ron Gould

Member of the Arizona House of Representatives from the 1st district
- In office January 1999 – January 2003 Serving with Barbara Blewster, Henry Camarot
- Preceded by: Donald R. Aldridge; Sue Lynch
- Succeeded by: Lucy Mason; Tom O'Halleran

Personal details
- Born: July 14, 1948 (age 78) London, England
- Party: Republican
- Spouse: Bill Binder
- Children: 1

Linda Binder (born July 14, 1948) is an American politician and a former Republican member of the Arizona Senate from Lake Havasu City, representing the 3rd Senate District. Binder served two terms in the state House, one in term the state Senate and as a member of the Lake Havasu City Council. She is the former Director of Mohave State Bank

== Elections ==
- 2002 Running for the State Senate in the newly redrawn 3rd District, Binder defeated Democrat Jacquie Jessie in the General election.
