= 2026 Arizona Corporation Commission election =

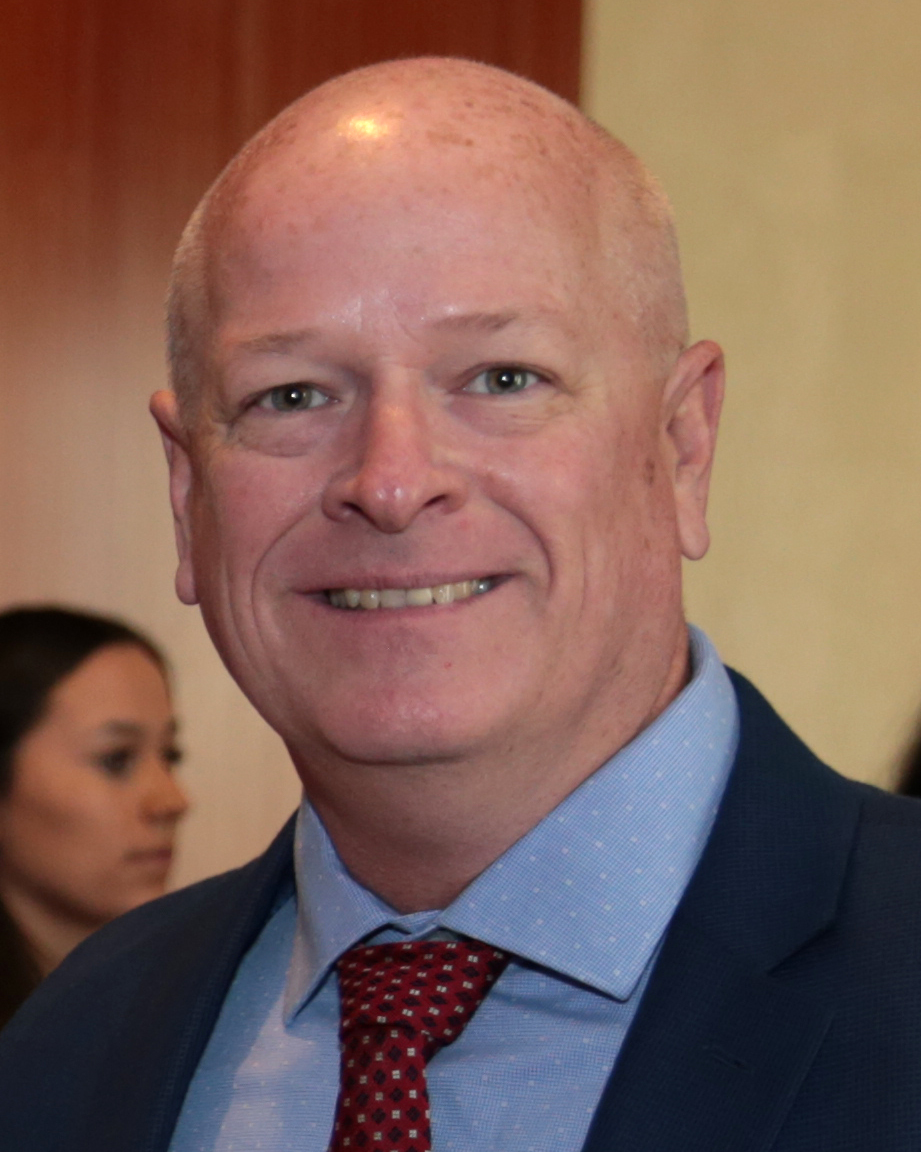

Nominee	Clara Pratte	Jonathon Hill
Party	Democratic	Democratic
Popular vote	1,276,108	1,224,900
Percentage	27.2%	26.1%
Nominee	Kevin Thompson	Ralph Heap
Party	Republican	Republican
Popular vote	1,091,206	1,020,919
Percentage	23.3%	21.8%
Commissioners before election
Kevin Thompson (Republican)
Nick Myers (Republican)
Elected Commissioners
Clara Pratte (Democratic)
Jonathon Hill (Democratic)

The 2026 Arizona Corporation Commission election were held on November 3, 2026, to elect two of five members to the Arizona Corporation Commission. Primary elections were held on July 21. Incumbents Kevin Thompson and Nick Myers, both Republicans, were running for re-election.

== Republican primary ==
=== Candidates ===
==== Nominees ====
- Ralph Heap, state representative from the 10th district (2025–present)
- Kevin Thompson, incumbent commissioner

==== Eliminated in primary ====
- Nick Myers, incumbent commissioner

==== Withdrawn ====
- David Marshall, former state representative from the 7th district (2023–2026) (appointed Navajo County Recorder)

=== Campaign ===
Heap and Marshall were running together as a duo. Both were members of the Arizona Freedom Caucus and were recruited to run by the caucus's chair, state senator Jake Hoffman. Heap and Marshall charged that Myers and Thompson were insufficiently supportive of president Donald Trump's agenda and positioned themselves as more conservative alternatives.

On April 21, 2026, Marshall ended his campaign and resigned his seat in the state house after being appointed Navajo County Recorder.

=== Results ===
Republican primary results
Party	Candidate	Votes	%
Republican	Kevin Thompson (incumbent)	325,029	35.8
Republican	Ralph Heap	299,319	33.0
Republican	Nick Myers (incumbent)	283,126	31.2
Total votes		907,474	100.0

== Democratic primary ==
=== Candidates ===
==== Nominees ====
- Jonathon Hill, researcher at Arizona State University's Mars Space Flight Facility and nominee for corporation commission in 2024
- Clara Pratte, former director of the Office of Native American Affairs at the U.S. Small Business Administration

=== Campaign ===
Hill and Pratte ran together as a duo.

=== Results ===
Democratic primary results
Party	Candidate	Votes	%
Democratic	Clara Pratte	432,609	53.4
Democratic	Jonathon Hill	377,925	46.6
Total votes		810,534	100.0

== Green primary ==
=== Candidates ===
==== Nominee ====
- Mike Cease, secretary of the Arizona Green Party and nominee for corporation commission in 2024 (write-in)

=== Results ===
Green primary results
Party	Candidate	Votes	%
Green	Mike Cease (write-in)	213	100.0
Total votes		213	100.0

== General election ==
=== Results ===
2026 Arizona Corporation Commission election
Party	Candidate	Votes	%
Democratic	Jonathon Hill	1,224,900	26.14
Democratic	Clara Pratte	1,276,108	27.23
Republican	Kevin Thompson (incumbent)	1,091,206	23.29
Republican	Ralph Heap	1,020,919	21.79
Green	Mike Cease	70,804	1.51
Write-in		2,339	0.05
Total votes		4,686,276	100.0%

Clara Pratte’s win made her the first Native American woman elected to any statewide elective executive office in Arizona; she is Navajo.
