= Betty Villegas =

American politician

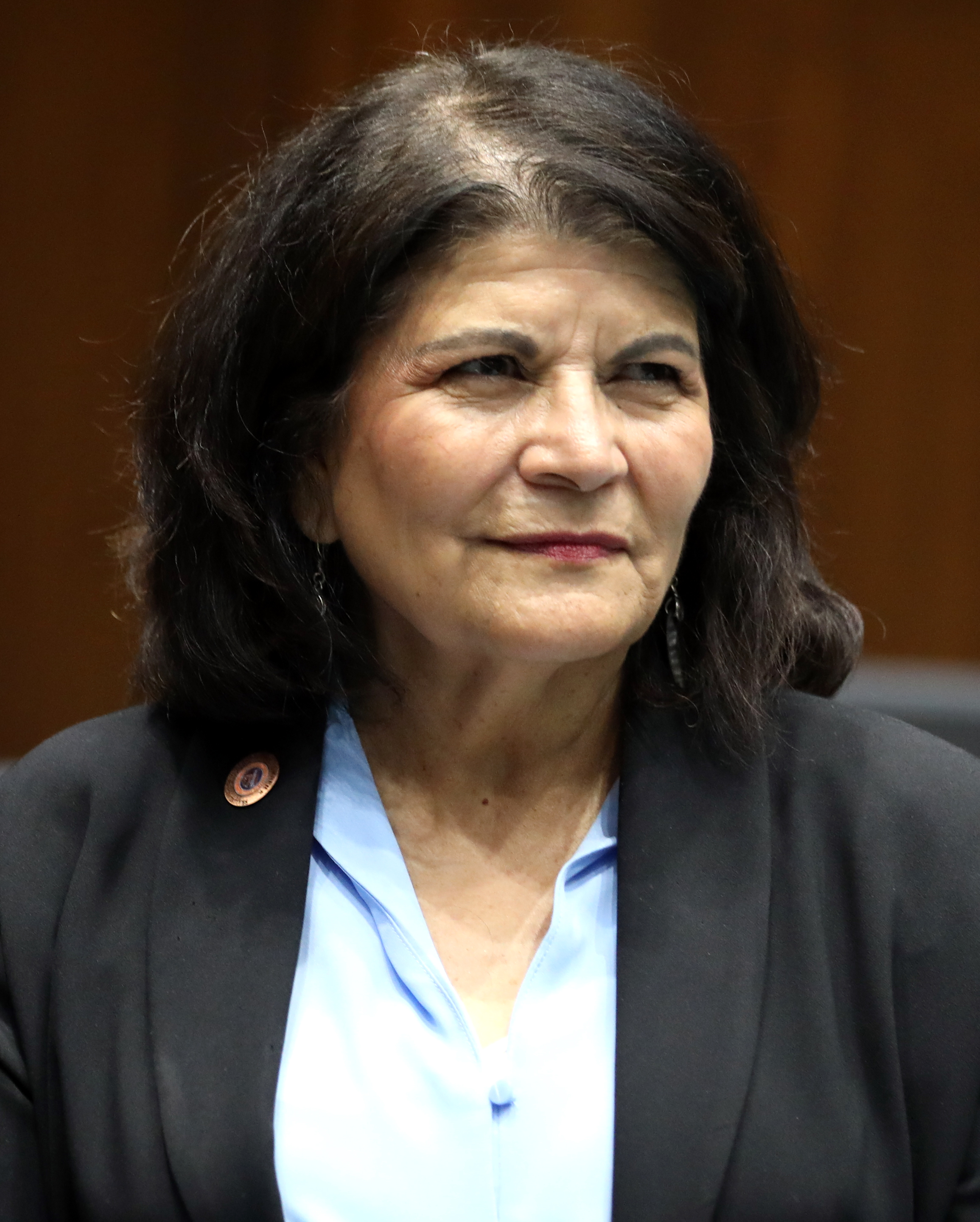
- Villegas in 2023

Member of the Arizona House of Representatives from the 20th district
- Incumbent
- Assumed office July 31, 2023 Serving with Alma Hernandez
- Preceded by: Andrés Cano

Personal details
- Party: Democratic

Betty Villegas is an American politician serving as a Democratic member of the Arizona House of Representatives for the 20th district since July 2023. She was a member of the Pima County Board of Supervisors in 2020.

== Life ==
Villegas is from Tucson, Arizona. In 2016, she retired from the Pima County, Arizona government as a housing program manager of the community development and neighborhood conservation. In 2020, she joined the Pima County Board of Supervisors after the death of Richard Elias.

A Democrat, she was appointed to the Arizona House of Representatives to succeed Andrés Cano in July 2023.
