= Andrés Cano =

American politician

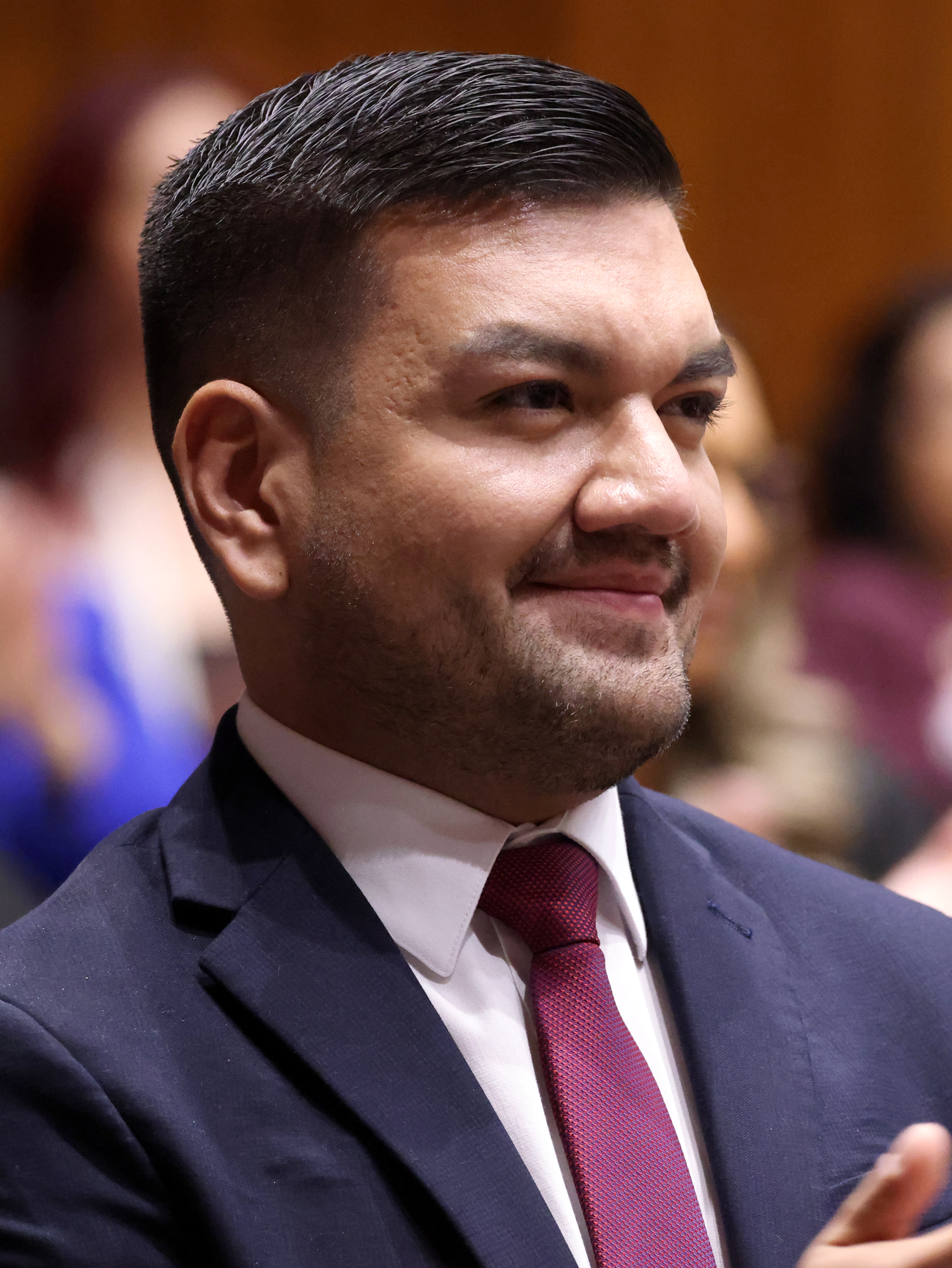
- Cano in 2025

Member of the Pima County Board of Supervisors from the 5th district
- Incumbent
- Assumed office April 15, 2025
- Preceded by: Adelita Grijalva

Minority Leader of the Arizona House of Representatives
- In office January 9, 2023 – June 13, 2023
- Preceded by: Reginald Bolding
- Succeeded by: Lupe Contreras

Member of the Arizona House of Representatives
- In office January 14, 2019 – July 4, 2023 Serving with Alma Hernandez
- Preceded by: Sally Ann Gonzales
- Succeeded by: Betty Villegas
- Constituency: 3rd district (2019–2023); 20th district (2023)

Personal details
- Born: May 14, 1992 (age 34) Tucson, Arizona, U.S.
- Party: Democratic
- Education: Arizona State University, Tempe (BA); Harvard University (MPA)

Andrés Cano (born May 14, 1992) is an American politician serving as a member of the Pima County Board of Supervisors since 2025. A Democrat, he previously served as the Minority Leader in the Arizona House of Representatives during Arizona's 56th legislature. Cano represented District 20 in 2023 and District 3 from 2019 to 2023.

== Early life and education ==
Cano was raised by a single mother in Section 8 housing. As a high school senior, he received a Gates Millennium Scholarship in 2009, helping him become the first person in his family to graduate from college.

Cano earned a Bachelor of Arts in broadcast journalism from Arizona State University in 2014. He graduated cum laude from the Walter Cronkite School of Journalism. While in college, Cano completed congressional internships in the offices of U.S. Senator Mark Udall and U.S. Congressman Ed Pastor.

In 2019, Cano completed Harvard University's John F. Kennedy School of Government program for Senior Executives in State and Local Government as a David Bohnett LGBTQ Victory Institute Leadership Fellow.

In 2023, Cano announced his resignation from the Arizona State Legislature to attend the Kennedy School fulltime for a Master of Public Administration. He graduated on May 23, 2024.

== Career ==
In 2012, Cano was hired by Pima County Supervisor Richard Elías to serve as his district aide and senior advisor. He was responsible for the office's constituent services, media relations, and neighborhood advocacy until 2019.

In 2016, Cano was named an inaugural fellow of the Human Rights Campaign's HIV360 Fellowship Program as part of his work to reduce HIV transmission among Latinos in Southern Arizona.

In July 2020, the LGBTQ+ Alliance Fund, an initiative of the Community Foundation for Southern Arizona, announced that it had selected Cano to serve as its first director. Under Cano's leadership from 2020 to 2023, the Fund tripled its permanent endowment and doubled its annual grant-making in Southern Arizona.

In June 2024, Cano announced that he had been appointed by the City of Tucson to serve as its Director of Federal & State Relations. In April 2025, he was appointed to the Pima County Board of Supervisors to succeed Adelita Grijalva, who resigned to run for congress.

== Arizona House of Representatives ==
On August 28, 2017, Cano announced his candidacy for the Arizona House of Representatives in a video posted on social media. Cano was the top vote-getter in the August 28, 2018, Democratic primary election, paving the path for his nomination as a candidate for one of two open seats in the November general election.

In 2020, Cano successfully ran for a second-term. He was re-elected to his third term in November 2022.

=== Tenure ===
In the 56th legislature, Cano served as the Ranking Democrat on the House Ways and Means Committee.

Prior to becoming Democratic Leader in January 2023, Cano served as the Ranking Democrat on the Natural Resources, Energy, and Water Committee in the 55th legislature.

As a legislator, Cano introduced legislation to restore funding to the state's community colleges. In 2022, Cano helped negotiate a historic bipartisan bill to conserve the state's water resources.

Cano resigned from the Arizona House of Representatives to pursue his graduate studies on July 4, 2023.

== Community Involvement & Recognition ==
Cano has served as volunteer board member with numerous organizations, including Planned Parenthood Arizona, Literacy Connects, Pan Left Productions, Imago Dei School and the Rural Community Assistance Corporation.

In 2015, Equality Arizona awarded Cano with their annual Emerging Leader Award.

In 2016, Cano was named an inaugural fellow of the Human Rights Campaign's HIV360 Fellowship Program as part of his work to reduce HIV transmission among Latinos in Southern Arizona.

In 2016, Cano was named the Center for the Future of Arizona's 'Emerging Leader,' becoming the organization's youngest—and first Latino—award recipient.

In 2020, Cano was awarded the Congressional Hispanic Caucus Institute's Young Alumnus of the Year Award.

Arizona House of Representatives
Preceded by Reginald Bolding	Minority Leader of the Arizona House of Representatives; 2023	Succeeded by Lupe Contreras
