= Alma Hernandez =

American politician (born 1993)

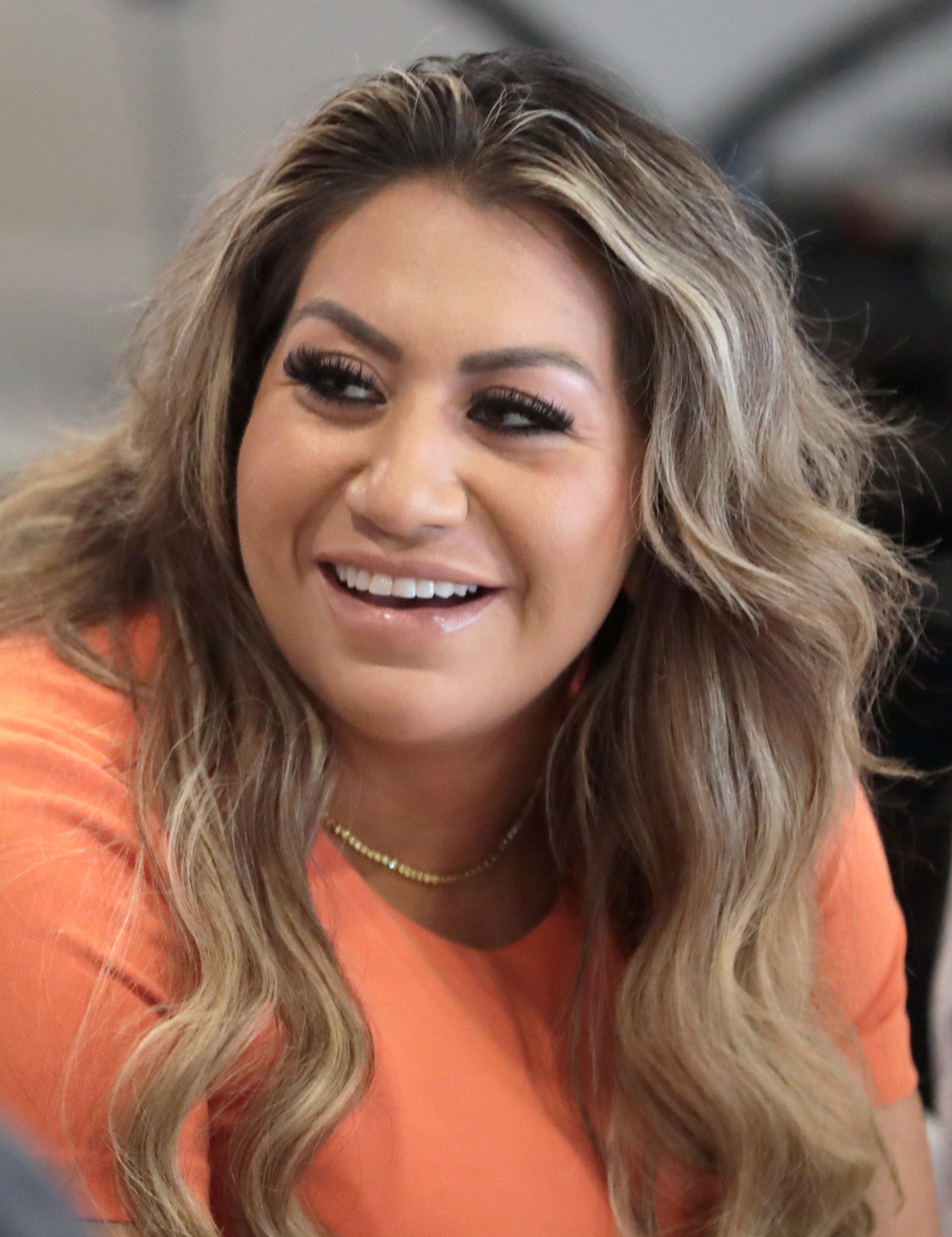
- Hernandez in 2022

Member of the Arizona House of Representatives from the 20th district
- Incumbent
- Assumed office January 9, 2023 Serving with Betty Villegas
- Preceded by: Shawnna Bolick

Member of the Arizona House of Representatives from the 3rd district
- In office January 14, 2019 – January 9, 2023 Serving with Andrés Cano
- Preceded by: Macario Saldate
- Succeeded by: Alexander Kolodin

Personal details
- Born: April 11, 1993 (age 33) Tucson, Arizona, U.S.
- Party: Democratic
- Relatives: Consuelo Hernandez (sister); Daniel Hernández Jr. (brother)
- Education: University of Arizona (BS, MPH, MLS); Arizona State University, Tempe

Alma Hernandez (born April 11, 1993) is an American politician serving as a Democratic member of the Arizona House of Representatives for the 20th district. Hernandez was elected in 2018 to succeed Macario Saldate, who was term-limited. She was the youngest woman elected to the Arizona House of Representatives.

== Early life and education ==
Hernandez is a native of Tucson, Arizona, and attended the University of Arizona before becoming involved as the program coordinator of Bridging the Gap, a program that helps women living with HIV/AIDS.

At the age of 14, when she was a student at Sunnyside High School, Hernandez was assaulted by two 19-year-old seniors outside the school, and then by the School Resource Officer who intervened. She was left with damage to her spine.

== Political career ==
On August 29, 2018, Hernandez finished in second place in the primary election of the Democratic Party for the 3rd Legislative District, which allowed her to advance to the elections to the Arizona House of Representatives. She was elected on November 6, 2018.

Her first achievement as an elected official was the approval with bipartisan support of an agreement to initiate mandatory training in crisis intervention and de-escalation for school resource officers in July 2019. On July 6, 2021, a bill sponsored by Hernandez requiring Holocaust education in public schools in Arizona was passed by the State Legislature. This made Arizona the 16th state of the United States to make Holocaust education mandatory.

In April 2023, Hernandez was one of five House Democrats who voted to override Governor Katie Hobbs' veto of HB2509, a bill that would have legalized sales of "cottage foods" and became well-known nationally as the "Tamale Bill." The veto override failed by 5 votes, with 12 Democrats changing their vote from the original House vote to the override. Alma said that her allegiance was "to Arizonans, not to Hobbs" in an interview with Arizona Mirror.

=== Stances ===
==== Jewish community ====
Hernandez has worked as the coordinator of Tucson’s Jewish Community Relations Council, and has been involved in the American Israel Public Affairs Committee.

On May 18, 2021, one of the doors of the Congregation Chaverim, which Hernandez belongs to, was smashed with a rock, and on June 7, 2021, a Chabad synagogue was vandalized in Tucson. She denounced both incidents on Twitter.

On July 11, 2021, Hernandez spoke at a rally organized by pro-Israel Jewish organizations held in front of the United States Capitol, denouncing antisemitism and stating her support of Israel. Additionally, in 2021, Hernandez introduced and passed a bill to make Holocaust education mandatory in Arizona.

In 2023, following the October 7 attacks, Hernandez was targeted by anti-Israel activists in her home neighborhood. She has been a vocal leader of Arizona Democrats rallying against pro-Palestinian organizations such as Mass Liberation.

In 2024, Hernandez wrote that labeling all Jews as white is "inherently racist and antisemitic". She described indigenous Jewish communities in Arab countries and Iran "who never left" until they were forced to flee in the 20th century; Black Jews; Latin American Jews; and Asian Jews.

In 2026, Hernandez wrote an opinion column for the New York Daily News denouncing streamer Hasan Piker as a "vulgar demagogue".

==== Immigration ====
Hernandez has served with the Young Democrats of America Hispanic caucus, and participated in rallies protesting Trump Administration's family separation policy, as well as coordinated deliveries of basic necessities to poor families in the Mexican border town of Nogales, where her mother is originally from, on behalf of a progressive activist group she co-founded, Tucson Jews for Justice.

== Personal life ==
Hernandez was raised in a non-religious home and converted to Judaism in 2015; she became interested in learning about Judaism during her teenage years after discovering that her maternal grandfather was Jewish. Her sister Consuelo Hernandez also serves as a State Representative and her brother Daniel Hernández Jr. is a former State Representative and Candidate for US Congress.

After being elected to the Arizona House of Representatives, she was featured, along with seven other women, in advertisement campaign for the plus-size clothing brand ELOQUII.
