= National Infrastructure Advisory Council =

Council of the US Department of Homeland Security

The National Infrastructure Advisory Council (NIAC) was a United States government advisory council that advised the president of the United States on the security of information systems in banking, finance, transportation, energy, manufacturing, and emergency government services. The George W. Bush administration's executive order 13231 of October 16, 2001, created the NIAC, and its functioning was last extended until September 30, 2023, by executive order 14048 of the Biden Administration.

In August 2017, the NIAC gained national attention when 8 of the 28 members resigned. They believed that President Donald Trump had given "insufficient attention to the growing threats to the cybersecurity of the critical systems upon which all Americans depend." The council has not met since 2024, and was not included in Executive Order 14354 which continued the existence of certain federal advisory boards.

== Purpose ==
The NIAC provides the United States President, through the Secretary of Homeland Security, with advice on the security of critical infrastructures, both physical and cyber, supporting sectors of the economy. It also has the authority to provide advice directly to the heads of other agencies that have shared responsibility for critical infrastructure protection, including Health and Human Services, Transportation, and Energy. The NIAC is charged to improve the cooperation and partnership between the public and private sectors in securing the critical infrastructures and advises on policies and strategies that range from risk assessment and management to information sharing to protective strategies and clarification on roles and responsibilities between public and private sectors.

== Background ==
The National Infrastructure Advisory Council (NIAC) was created by Executive Order 13231 of October 16, 2001, and amended by Executive Order 13286 of February 28, 2003, Executive Order 13385 of September 29, 2005, Executive Order 13446 of September 28, 2007, and Executive Order 13511 of September 29, 2009. The council is composed of not more than 30 members, appointed by the president, who are selected from the private sector, academia, and State and local government, representing senior executive leadership expertise from the critical infrastructure and key resource areas as delineated in HSPD-7. LEADERSHIP: The position of NIAC chair and vice-chair are named by the president.

As of August 2023, the NIAC Chair position was held by Adebayo Ogulesi, Chairman and CEO of Global Infrastructure Partners, and Ms. Maria Lehman served as the vice-chair.

== NIAC operations ==
The NIAC meets publicly four times each year. All meetings, whether in person or by teleconference, are hosted in Washington, D.C., in a venue open to the public and members desiring to attend in person. The council uses its public meetings as working meetings, focused on progress reports from its working groups, and on deliberations to produce useful and actionable recommendations in a timely manner. The council is very active, taking on up to six major studies per year, with high-performance goals of delivering quality, well-researched reports between 6–12 months from the inception of the selected studies. Its reports have drawn public and private sector interest with regular requests from Congressional committees for copies. Public meetings are normally attended by several members of the Press. The president meets with the council at least once a year and has directed very specific requests to the council for recommendations on issues of interest. The White House monitors the progress of the Council’s studies on a regular basis between meetings through a liaison in the Homeland Security Council.

== 2017 resignations ==
In August 2017, 8 of the 28 members of the NIAC resigned. According to their resignation letter, the members believed that President Donald Trump has given "insufficient attention to the growing threats to the cybersecurity of the critical systems upon which all Americans depend, including those impacting the systems supporting our democratic election process", they also mentioned "his failure "to denounce intolerance and violence of hate groups" when asked about the "horrific violences in Charlottesville", and they pointed to his move to withdraw from the Paris Agreement. The members had been appointed under the Obama administration.

The council continued to meet and do business with the remaining members.

== NIAC membership ==
As of August 2023, the members of the NIAC were:

- Chair: Adebayo Ogulesi, Chairman and CEO of Global Infrastructure Partners.
- Vice Chair: Maria Lehman, US Infrastructure Lead at GHD, Inc.
- Alan Armstrong, President and CEO of Williams, Inc.
- Manu Asthana, president and CEO of PJM Interconnection.
- Camille Batiste, Senior Vice President for Global Supply Chain & Procurement at Archer Daniels Midland.
- Madhu Beriwal, Founder of Innovative Emergency Management, Inc.
- Dennen DeFiore, Vice President and Chief Information Security Officer at United Airlines.
- Josh Descant, CEO of REV.
- Christine Fox, Senior Fellow at Johns Hopkins Applied Physics Laboratory (APL).
- David Gadis, CEO and General Manager of DC Water.
- Michael Hayford, CEO of NCR Corporation.
- Constance Lau, former president and CEO of Hawaiian Electric Industries.
- Dr. Norma Jean Mattei, Professor at University of New Orleans’ Department of Civil and Environmental Engineering.
- Clara Pratte, advocate for tribal communities.
- Gil Quiniones, CEO of ComEd.
- Jorge Ramirez, Managing Director for Labor and Government Strategies at GCM Grosvenor.
- Pasquale Romano, President and Chief Executive Officer at ChargePoint.
- Beverly Scott, former Chief Executive Officer and General Manager of MBTA.
- Dr. Patricia Sims, President of Drake State Community & Technical College.
- Luis “Vance” Taylor, Chief of Office of Access & Functional Needs in the California Governor’s Office of Emergency Services.
- Tony Thomas, President and Chief Executive Officer of Windstream.
- Dr. Conrad Vial, senior executive at Sutter Health.
- Sadek Wahba, Chairman and Managing Partner of I Squared Capital.
- Chris Wiernicki, Chairman, President and Chief Executive Officer of the American Bureau of Shipping.
- Audrey Zibelman, Founder of Zibelman Energy Advisors.
