= Clara Pratte =

American politician

- Pratte in 2026

Member of the Arizona Corporation Commission
- Assuming office January 2027
- Succeeding: Kevin Thompson

Personal details
- Born: 1978 or 1979 (age 47–48)
- Citizenship: Navajo Nation; United States
- Party: Democratic
- Children: 2
- Education: Carnegie Mellon University

Clara Pratte (born 1978/1979) is an American politician who is a member-elect of the Arizona Corporation Commission. In the 2026 election, she and Jonathon Hill defeated the Republican candidates, making Pratte the first Indigenous woman elected to statewide office in Arizona.

Pratte is a former director of the Office of Native American Affairs at the U.S. Small Business Administration. Pratte is executive director and chair of Navajo Power, a Flagstaff, Arizona-based public benefit corporation that works on renewable energy projects on tribal lands.

== Early life and education ==
Pratte was born in 1978 or 1979. She is Kinyaa'áanii, born for Bilagáana, with a maternal grandfather of the Honágháahnii clan and a paternal grandfather who is Bilagáana. She was raised by her mother and a stepfather from the Dibé Łizhiní clan. Her hometown is Lupton, Arizona where she did not have running water or electricity. Pratte is a member of Navajo Nation and her religion is traditional Navajo.

Her first job was working as a hostess at Sizzler. She earned a master's degree in public policy from Carnegie Mellon University.

== Career ==
Early in her career, Pratte collected advertisement money for an independent newspaper. She was later an information technology specialist at the International Trade Administration. By September 2007, Pratte was a government and legislative affairs associate at the Navajo Nation's Washington office. In May 2009, she became director of the Office of Native American Affairs at the U.S. Small Business Administration.

In 2013, Pratte founded Strongbow Strategies, a government services company. In 2018, Pratte joined Navajo Power, a Flagstaff, Arizona-based public benefit corporation that develops renewable energy projects on tribal lands. For her work, she was awarded the 2020 Pritzker Emerging Environmental Genius Award presented by the University of California, Los Angeles's Institute of the Environment and Sustainability. It was a $100,000 award funded via a grant from the Anthony and Jeanne Pritzker Family Foundation. As of 2025, she serves as Navajo Power's executive director and chair.

During the presidential transition of Joe Biden, Pratte was a member of his tribal engagement team. Biden appointed her to the National Infrastructure Advisory Council in December 2022. In 2024, Pratte was on the board of directors of the World Wildlife Fund.

Pratte and Jonathon Hill won the 2026 Arizona Corporation Commission election. Running as Democrats, they defeated incumbent Kevin Thompson and representative Ralph Heap. During the campaign, Pratte and Hill pledged to be Clean Elections candidates by refusing funding from political action committees and special interest groups. She is the first indigenous woman elected to statewide office in Arizona.

== Personal life ==
As of 2025, Pratte lives in Flagstaff, Arizona with her husband and two sons.

== See also ==
- List of Native American politicians
- Native American women in politics
