= Arizona Green Party =

Arizona affiliate of the Green Party

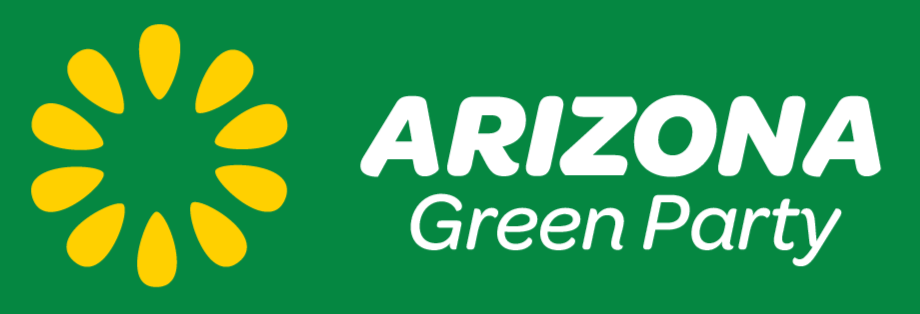
- Chairperson: Sam Hales
- Headquarters: P.O. Box 60173; Phoenix, Arizona 85082
- Membership (2026): ▲5,312
- Ideology: Green politics
- Political position: Left-wing
- National affiliation: Green Party of the United States
- Colors: Green
- Seats in the U.S. Senate: 0 / 2
- Seats in the U.S. House: 0 / 9
- Statewide Offices: 0 / 11
- Seats in the State Senate: 0 / 30
- Seats in the State House: 0 / 60
- Other elected officials: 1 (February 2024)

Website
- azgp.org

The Arizona Green Party (AZGP) is the officially recognized affiliate of the Green Party in the state of Arizona. It was founded by Carolyn Campbell alongside others in the 1990s. Sam Hales, whose term expires January 2028, serves as Co-Chairperson of the Arizona Green Party with the other chair being vacant.

== History ==
=== Ballot access ===
The Arizona Green Party first achieved ballot access in June 1992 after a yearslong effort. The party failed to retain statewide ballot status in 1994 due a lack of the required minimum number of registered party members and fell off the ballot.

The Arizona Green Party next achieved ballot status in 2000. It lost it again in 2001. However, the party remained on the ballot in Pima County due to the electoral performance of candidates for county offices. In 2001, enough signatures were submitted to achieve ballot access in Tucson's city elections.

In 2008, the Arizona Green Party gathered enough signatures to again gain statewide ballot access. The party had worked with Arizona's ballot access laws, achieving ballot access for the 2000 election cycle, then losing it again in 2004. On March 6, 2008, the Arizona deadline for ballot access, the Arizona Green Party submitted 29,300 signatures on its petition for party recognition. The legal requirement was 20,449. On April 9, 2008, Arizona Secretary of State Jan Brewer announced that the Arizona Green Party had enough valid signatures to be recognized as an official political party. Angel Torres,the co-chair of the party, stated, "No matter what the issue—on the environment, the economy—our platform is far and away better Republican or Democrat."

The Green Party lost recognition in December 2009; however, in April 2010, it regained it for the 2010 election.

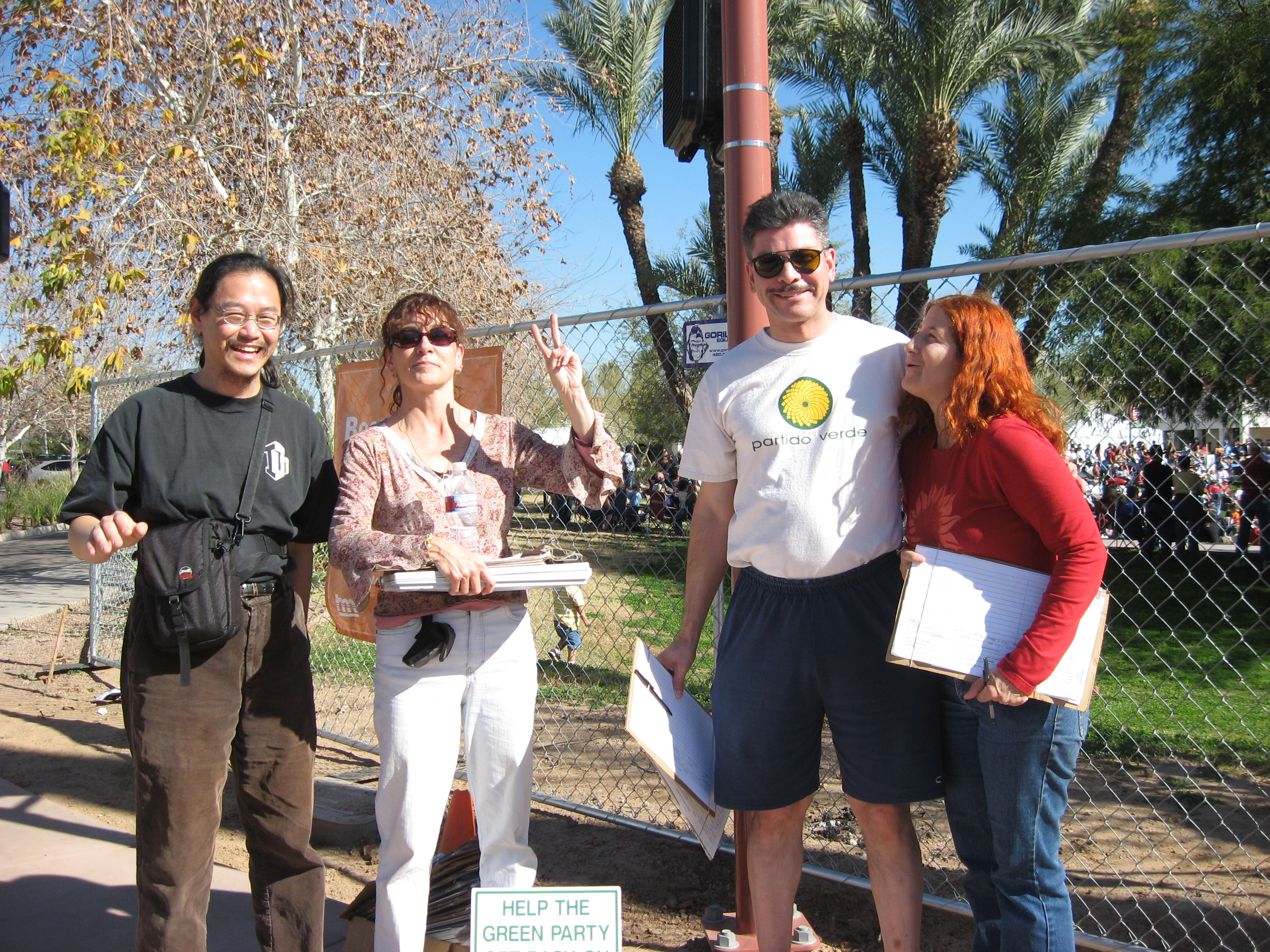
Activists of the Arizona Green Party collecting signatures for ballot status.

On April 28, 2011, Governor Jan Brewer signed HB 2304, which says that when a new party qualifies, it is entitled to be on the ballot in the next two elections, not just the next election. As a result, the Green Party was automatically on the ballot for 2012 because it had successfully petitioned in 2010. The Green Party lost recognition once again in late 2013 due to low voter registration. The party failed to gather enough signatures to be on the 2014 ballot.

In 2016, the Arizona Green Party successfully sued the state of Arizona to ensure its presidential nominee, Jill Stein, was placed on the ballot after the party failed to submit a slate of Presidential electors on time. Jill Stein received a total of 34,345 votes in Arizona, leaving her with 1.3% of the total vote. The Green Party again lost recognition in late 2019 due to low voter registration.

In December 2023, Arizona Secretary of State Adrian Fontes announced that the Arizona Green Party had enough signatures to be recognized as an official political party and was eligible to appear on statewide and legislative election ballots in 2024 and 2026.

The Green Party of Arizona did not appear on the March State of Arizona 2024 Presidential Preference Election ballot due to not being recognized as an official political party in time. But potential candidates were placed on the primary and general elections ballots in 2024.

In 2026, the Arizona Green Party asked the Arizona Secretary of State to remove the winner of the party's gubernatorial primary from the general election ballot. The Secretary of State’s Office said it could not act on its own to remove candidates from the ballot.

=== Campaigns ===
Prominent Green candidates in Arizona have included Vance Hansen, who ran for the US Senate in 2000 and received 108,926 votes. Claudia Ellquist ran for Pima County Attorney in 2004 on a platform largely focused on declaring a moratorium on the death penalty. Dave Croteau ran for mayor of Tucson in 2007 on a platform of relocalization and received over 28% of the vote.

=== 2012 presidential primary election results ===
The Arizona Green Party held its presidential primary on February 28, 2012. Jill Stein won with 68.6% of the vote.

Arizona Green Party presidential primary, February 28, 2012
Candidate	Votes	Percentage	National delegates
Jill Stein	385	68.6%	5
Kent Mesplay	50	8.9%	0
Richard Grayson	39	6.9%	0
Michael Oatman	39	6.9%	0
Gary Swing	30	5.3%	0
Gerard Davis	18	3.2%	0
Total	561	100%	5

=== 2016 primary election results ===
The Arizona Green Party held its primary on March 22, 2016. Jill Stein won with 79.6% of the vote, and the overall number of voters that took part in the primary saw an increase from 561 in 2012 to 817 in 2016. Only two candidates qualified for the primary:

Arizona Green Party presidential primary, March 22, 2016
Candidate	Votes	Percentage	National delegates
Jill Stein	609	79.6%	5
Kent Mesplay	139	18.2%	1
Write-in/Blank	17	2.2%	-
Total	765	100.0%	6

County results of the Arizona Green presidential primaries, 2016. Jill Stein Kent Mesplay No votes

== Elections ==
=== President ===
Year	Nominee	Votes	%
1996	Ralph Nader (write-in)	2,062	0.2 / 100
2000	Ralph Nader	45,645	3.0 / 100
2004	David Cobb (write-in)	138	0.0 / 100
2008	Cynthia McKinney	3,406	0.2 / 100
2012	Jill Stein	7,816	0.3 / 100
2016	Jill Stein	34,345	1.3 / 100
2020	Howie Hawkins (write-in)	1,557	0.1 / 100
2024	Jill Stein	18,319	0.5 / 100

=== United States Senate ===
Year	Nominee	Votes	%
2000	Vance Hansen	108,926	7.8 / 100
2010	Jerry Joslyn	24,603	1.5 / 100
2016	Gary Swing	138,634	5.5 / 100
2018	Angela Green	57,442	2.4 / 100
2024	Eduardo Quintana	75,868	2.3 / 100

=== United States House of Representatives ===
Year	District	Nominee	Votes	%
2000	5th	Michael Jay Green	9,010	3.1 / 100
2008	2nd	William Crum	3,616	1.1 / 100
2008	4th	Rebecca DeWitt	4,464	3.6 / 100
2010	3rd	Leonard Clark	3,294	1.6 / 100
2010	4th	Rebecca DeWitt	2,365	2.6 / 100
2010	6th	Richard Grayson	3,407	1.4 / 100
2012 (special)	8th	Charlie Manolakis	4,869	5.3 / 100
2012	6th	Mark Salazar	5,637	1.9 / 100
2016	1st	Ray Parrish	16,746	6.0 / 100
2016	7th	Neil Westbrooks (write-in)	60	0.0 / 100
2016	8th	Mark Salazar	93,954	31.43 / 100
2018	4th	Haryaksha Knauer	3,672	1.3 / 100
2018	7th	Gary Swing	18,706	14.2 / 100
2024	1st	Alan Aversa	5,008	2.5 / 100
2024	4th	Vincent Beck-Jones	6,065	1.8 / 100
2024	6th	Athena Eastwood	10,759	2.5 / 100
2025 (special)	7th	Eduardo Quintana	1,118	1.1 / 100
2026	3rd	David Redkey	7,782	5.16 / 100
2026	6th	Gary Swing	3,264	0.91 / 100

=== Governor ===
Year	Candidate	Votes	%
2010	Larry Gist	16,128	0.93 / 100
2018	Angel Torres	50,962	2.14 / 100
2022	Liana West (Write-in)	254	0.001 / 100
2022	William Josué Pounds IV (Write-in)	139	0.001 / 100
2026	Risa Lombardo / Lisa Castillo (Lt. Gov.)	24,644	0.91 / 100

=== Arizona State Senate ===
Year	District	Candidate	Votes	%
1992	15th	Mike McNally	9.519	22.2 / 100
2000	11th	Daniel Patterson	2,972	8.93 / 100
2008	24th	Jack Kretzer	9,167	23.57 / 100
2010	17th	Anthony "Grand Pa" Goshorn	784	1.84 / 100
2016	27th	Angel Torres	6,420	19 / 100
2018	11th	Mohammad Arif	1,076	1.1 / 100
2024	2nd	Dennis Pugsley	2,076	2.0 / 100

=== Arizona State House of Representatives ===
Year	Districts	Nominee	Votes	%
1992	11th	Carolyn Campbell	5,472	11.25 / 100
1992	12th	David M. Perkins	4,686	4.33 / 100
1992	29th	Jesse J. Chanley Jr.	3,836	6.24 / 100
2000	11th	Bill Moeller	5,382	16.1 / 100
2000	9th	William Crosby	5,407	5.84 / 100
2000	10th	Jack Strasburg	4,155	12.55 / 100
2000	14th	Mary "Katie" Bolger	8,907	14.45 / 100
2000	25th	John Scudder	3,168	6.32 / 100
2000	26th	Eli Manders	3,578	4.82 / 100
2008	12th	Celeste Castorena	5,976	3.3 / 100
2008	10th	Margarite Dale	2,358	2.6 / 100
2008	27th	Kent Solberg	4,970	5.3 / 100
2010	16th	Angel Torres	2,532	5.19 / 100
2010	6th	Deborah Odowd	5,405	5.85 / 100
2010	17th	Gregor Knauer	862	1.55 / 100
2010	12th	Justin Dahl	6,762	6.16 / 100
2010	27th	Kent Solberg	5,778	8.13 / 100
2010	21st	Linda Macias	17,181	17.1 / 100
2010	15th	Luisa Evonne Valdez	1,343	2.6 / 100
2012	27th	Angel Torres	3,702	5.28 / 100
2012	26th	Haryaksha Knauer	1,872	2.18 / 100
2012	16th	Bill Maher	9,094	7.84 / 100
2012	24th	Gerard Davis	5,946	6.43 / 100
2016	26th	Cara Nicole Trujillo	6,327	11.5 / 100
2016	3rd	Edward ‘Trey’ Cizek	10,150	12.07 / 100
2016	1st	Haryaksha Knauer	9,407	6.67 / 100
2016	5th	Leo Biasiucci	7,648	6.84 / 100
2016	18th	Linda Macias	14,475	12.3 / 100
2018	3rd	Beryl Baker	8,566	11.58 / 100
2018	10th	Joshua Reilly	7,896	5.7 / 100
2018	16th	Richard Grayson	11,646	8.3 / 100
2018	4th	Sara Mae Williams	8,334	15.34 / 100
2024	8th	Tre Rook	7,559	5.2 / 100
2024	13th	Cody Hannah	3,361	1.5 / 100
2024	14th	Scott Menor	28,653	16.7 / 100
2026	6th	Brendan Trachsel	10,161	9.69 / 100
2026	7th	Richard Grayson	13,447	8.28 / 100
2026	26th	Hector Gomez	1,299	1.95 / 100

=== State Elections ===
Year	Office	Candidate	Votes	%
2010	State Treasurer	Thomas Meadows	46,115	2.8 / 100
2010	Arizona Corporation Commission	Benjamin Pearcy	47,121	1.6 / 100
2010	Arizona Corporation Commission	Theodore Gomez	42,645	1.4 / 100
2012	Arizona Corporation Commission	Thomas Meadows	67,950	1.2 / 100
2012	Arizona Corporation Commission	Daniel Pout	58,607	1.1 / 100
2024	Arizona Corporation Commission	Nina Luxenberg	110,486	1.3 / 100
2024	Arizona Corporation Commission	Mike Cease	101,473	1.2 / 100
2026	Secretary of State	Duwayne Collier	38,381	1.50 / 100
2026	Arizona Corporation Commission	Mike Cease	70,804	1.51 / 100

=== County Elections ===
Year	Office	Candidate	Votes	%
1992	Pima County Board of Supervisors	Jack Strasburg	3,777	6 / 100
2000	Pima County Attorney	Peter Hormel	N/A	10 / 100
2000	Schools Superintendent	Susan K. Campbell	N/A	10 / 100
2000	Pima County Sheriff	Dave Croteau	N/A	18 / 100
2000	Pima County Recorder	William Zaffer	N/A	16 / 100
2004	Pima County Attorney	Claudia Ellquist	N/A	8 / 100
2008	Pima County Attorney	Claudia Ellquist	17,883	6.1 / 100
2014	Justice of the Peace	June Pitts	4,098	22.7 / 100
2016	Pima County Attorney	Cynthia Tuell	107,566	30.07 / 100
2016	Pima County Recorder	Mike Cease	80,588	22.07 / 100
2016	Pima County Board of Supervisors	Martin Bastidas	12,143	21.48 / 100
2016	Pima County Board of Supervisors	Joshua Reilly	26,150	27.27 / 100
2016	Justice of the Peace	Nancy Knox-Bierman	4,369	15.49 / 100
2016	Constable	Beryl Baker	8,694	24.58 / 100
2024	Pima County Attorney	Howard Druan	94,383	24.04 / 100

=== City Elections ===
Year	Office	Candidate	Votes	%
2007	Tucson Mayor	Dave Croteau	17,962	28.08 / 100
2007	Tucson City Council	Beryl Baker	15,551	26.62 / 100
2009	Tucson City Council	Mary DeCamp	4,429	6.16 / 100
2011	Tucson Mayor	Mary DeCamp	3,617	4.8 / 100
2011	Tucson City Council	Beryl Baker	22,301	34 / 100
2017	Tucson City Council	Mike Cease	5,721	7.03 / 100
2019	Tucson Mayor	Mike Cease	3,953	4 / 100
2019	Tucson City Council	Matthew Smith	4,817	4.87 / 100
2019	Tucson City Council	William Peterson	5,337	5.38 / 100
2019	Tucson City Council	Cara Bissell	4,790	4.83 / 100

== See also ==
- Political party strength in Arizona
- 2000 United States Senate election in Arizona
- 2016 United States Senate election in Arizona
