= Steve May =

American politician from Arizona (born 1971)

Stephen Timothy May (born November 29, 1971) is an American politician who served in the Arizona House of Representatives. He was openly gay when he ran for and served in the legislature. He was nevertheless recalled to active duty in the military. He came to national attention in 1999 when the U.S. Army attempted to discharge him from the United States Army Reserve under the gay-exclusionary law known as "don't ask, don't tell" (DADT).

== Early life and career ==
May was born on November 29, 1971, and grew up in a Mormon household in Phoenix, Arizona, in the district he later represented in the state legislature. He is an Eagle Scout. He entered the Naval Reserve Officer Training Corps in 1989 at the age of 17 at Claremont McKenna College and received his commission as a U.S. Army officer in 1993. He served for two and a half years at Fort Riley, Kansas. His assignments included managing the integration of women into an all-male platoon. He left the Army with an honorable discharge in 1995. May ran unsuccessfully for the Arizona Senate in 1996 before winning a seat in the Arizona House of Representatives in 1998, as a Republican. He ran as an openly gay man and had secured the endorsement of the Gay & Lesbian Victory Fund, a political action committee dedicated to helping elect openly LGBT candidates to public office. He and his family have engaged in protracted lawsuits about their competing business interests.

== Discharge proceedings under DADT ==
On February 3, 1999, May spoke to a committee of the Arizona House about pending legislation that would prevent local jurisdictions from providing benefits to the domestic partners of their employees. He said:

I know many of you expected me to sit quietly in my office, but I cannot sit quietly in my office when another member attacks my family and attempts to steal my freedom. And furthermore if this legislature intends to take my gay tax dollars, which work just as well as your straight tax dollars, then treat me fairly under the law.

A few weeks later, as the Kosovo crisis was developing, he was recalled by the Army Reserves, where he attained the rank of First Lieutenant. He returned to duty in April and in May a local magazine reported on him under the headline "Gay Right Wing Mormon Steve May is a Walking Talking Contradiction". In July the Army notified him that he was under investigation for homosexuality. An Army spokesman commented in August: "I don't think that the individual has been, shall we say, keeping this under wraps, as to his sexual orientation." In March 2000, the Army asked him to resign and he refused. On September 17, 2000, an Army panel recommended May be given an honorable discharge under DADT. May fought to remain in service and in January 2001 the Army terminated its discharge proceedings. May received an honorable discharge in May 2001 at the scheduled conclusion of his term of service.

== State legislator ==
During his time in office, May served as the chairman of the House Ways and Means committee and was instrumental in getting Arizona's sodomy law repealed. In June 2000, May filed suit against the state of Arizona after receiving a parking ticket that included a mandatory 10% surcharge to be paid into a state fund, enacted by referendum in 1998, to provide subsidies to candidates for public office who agreed to certain campaign finance restrictions. May refused to pay the surcharge, claiming it was compelled political speech and an infringement of his rights under the First Amendment of the United States Constitution and also provisions of the Arizona Constitution. The Arizona Supreme Court ruled in 2002 that the surcharge did not violate May's rights.

== Later political campaigns ==
In 2002, May lost his bid for re-election facing two fellow incumbents who were set to run against each other following redistricting pursuant to the 2000 United States census, by 58 votes. Following the loss, May served as Chief Operating Officer of Wisdom Natural Brands, until retiring in 2008. When Arizona Representative John Shadegg announced his retirement in 2008 May announced plans to run for the seat, but withdrew from the race when Shadegg announced he would seek another term after all.

In 2010, May joined the race for Arizona's 17th District House seat as a write-in candidate. In August, May was one of several Republicans named in a complaint filed by the Arizona Democratic Party, alleging that he conspired to recruit Mill Avenue street people to run as Green Party write-in "sham" candidates to pull votes from Democrats. May acknowledged that he recruited candidates but denies any conspiracy or wrongdoing. District court judge David G. Campbell denied a request from the state Green Party to remove the candidates from the ballot. Following the revelation of a 2009 guilty plea to a charge of driving under the influence of alcohol, for which May served ten days in jail and received three years of probation, May dropped out of the race.

== See also ==
- Sexual orientation and the United States military

== Notes ==
Arizona House of Representatives
Preceded by Robin Shaw; Tom Smith	Member of the Arizona House of Representatives from the 26th district 1999–2003; Served alongside: Jeff Hatch-Miller	Succeeded by Pete Hershberger; Steve Huffman
