= Sally Ann Gonzales =

American politician

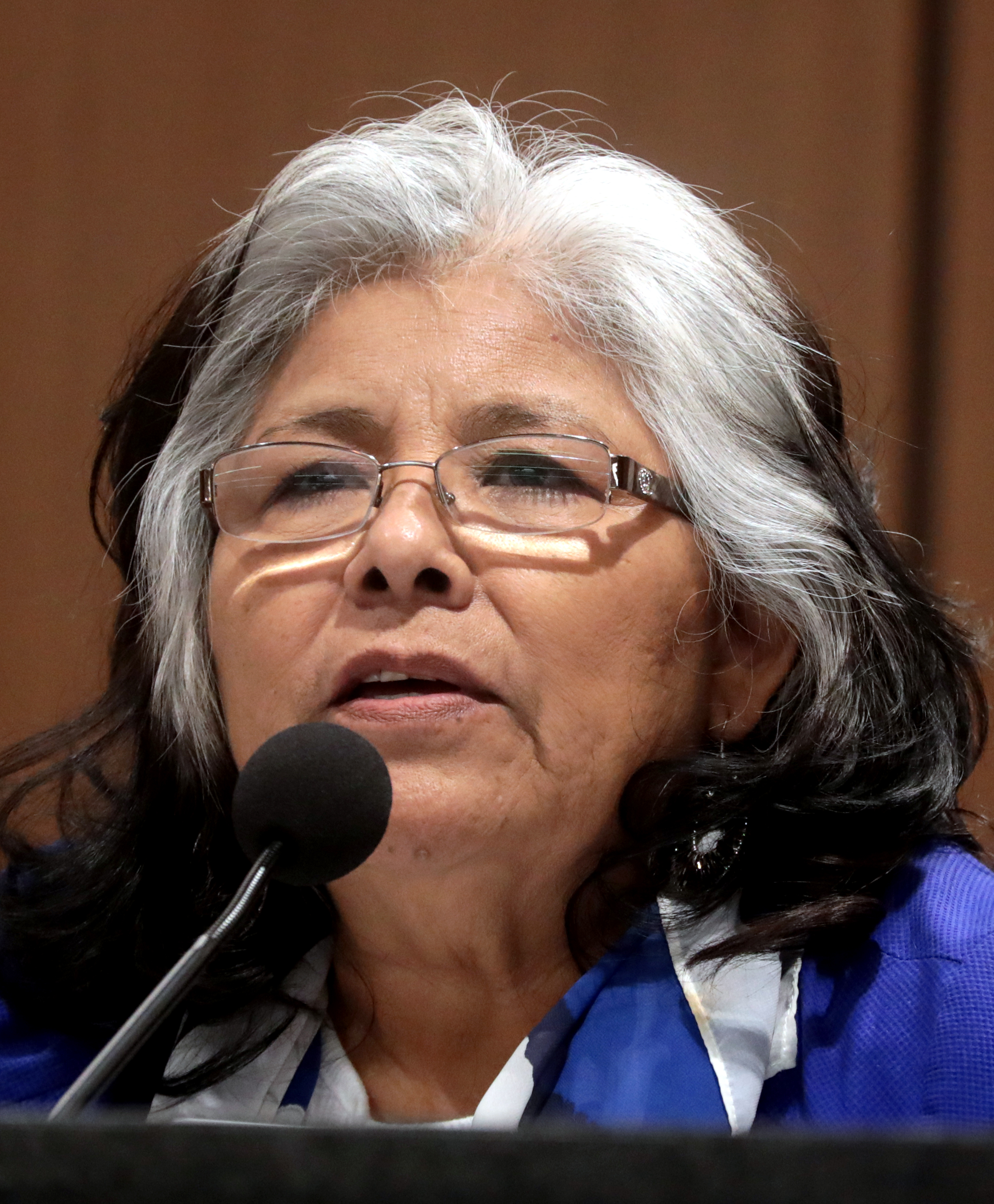

Member of the Arizona Senate from the 20th district
- Incumbent
- Assumed office January 9, 2023
- Preceded by: Paul Boyer

Member of the Arizona Senate from the 3rd district
- In office January 14, 2019 – January 9, 2023
- Preceded by: Olivia Cajero Bedford
- Succeeded by: John Kavanagh

Member of the Arizona House of Representatives from the 3rd district
- In office January 14, 2013 – January 14, 2019
- Succeeded by: Andrés Cano

Member of the Arizona House of Representatives from the 27th district
- In office January 10, 2011 – January 14, 2013 Serving with Macario Saldate

Member of the Arizona House of Representatives from the 20th district
- In office January 1997 – January 2001 Serving with Ramon Valadez

Personal details
- Born: October 2, 1957 (age 69) Brawley, California, U.S.
- Party: Democratic
- Education: Arizona State University; University of Arizona
- Website: Senate Website

Sally Ann Gonzales (born October 2, 1957) is an American politician and a Democratic member of the Arizona State Senate representing District 20 since January 9, 2023. She previously represented District 3 from 2019 to 2023, and also served in the Arizona House of Representatives representing District 3 since from 2013 to 2019. She previously served consecutively from January 10, 2011, until January 14, 2013, in the District 27 seat, and non-consecutively from January 1997 until January 2001 in the District 20 seat.

== Education ==
Gonzales earned her BA in elementary education from Arizona State University and her MA in multicultural education from the University of Arizona.

== Elections ==
- 2014 Gonzales and Macario Saldate were unopposed in the general election.
- 2012 Redistricted to District 3, and with incumbent Republican Representatives Nancy McLain running for Arizona Senate and Doris Goodale redistricted to District 5, Gonzales and Representative Saldate were both unopposed for the August 28, 2012 Democratic Primary; Gonzales placed first with 11,317 votes. Gonzales and Saldate were unopposed for the November 6, 2012 General election, with Gonzales taking the first seat with 35,795 votes ahead of Saldate.
- 2010 With incumbent Representatives Olivia Cajero Bedford running for Arizona Senate and Phil Lopes retiring and leaving both of the district's seats open, Gonzales ran in the eight-way August 24, 2010 Democratic Primary, placing first with 4,126 votes; in the five-way November 2, 2010 General election, Gonzales took the first seat with 23,623 votes ahead of fellow Democrat Macario Saldate, who took the second seat, Republican nominee Robert Compton, Green candidate Kent Solberg, and Independent Gene Chewning, who had been a Republican nominee for the seat in 2006.
- 2002 Redistricted to District 27, and with incumbent Republican Representative Laura Knaperek running for Arizona Senate and Democratic Representative Meg Burton Cahill redistricted to District 17, Gonzales ran in the six-way September 10, 2002 Democratic Primary, placing third behind Olivia Cajero Bedford and Phil Lopes, who were unopposed for the November 5, 2002 General election.
- 1998 Gonzalez and Representative Valadez were both unopposed for both the September 8, 1998 Democratic Primary; Gonzales placed first with 2,569 votes, and took the first seat in the November 3, 1998 General election with 11,761 votes ahead of Representative Valadez.
- 1996 When District 10 incumbent Democratic Representatives Carmen Cajero and Phillip Hubbard left the Legislature and left the district's seats open, Gonzalez ran in the four-way September 12, 1996 Democratic Primary, placing second with 3,307 votes, and took the first seat in the November 5, 1996 General election with 15,466 votes ahead of fellow Democrat Ramon Valadez and Republican nominee Robert Motta.

== See also ==
- List of Native American politicians
- Native American women in politics
