= Arizona's 20th legislative district =

American legislative district

- Map of District 20: Approved January 21, 2022
- Senator: Sally Ann Gonzales (D)
- House members: Alma Hernandez (D); Betty Villegas (D)
- Registration: 46.78% Democratic; 15.95% Republican; 35.67% Other
- Demographics: 34% White; 4% Black/African American; 4% Native American; 4% Asian; 53% Hispanic
- Population: 238,486
- Voting-age population: 191,639
- Registered voters: 125,451

Arizona's 20th legislative district is one of 30 in the state, consisting of a section of Pima County. As of 2023, there are 56 precincts in the district, all in Pima, with a total registered voter population of 125,451. The district has an overall population of 238,486.

Following the 2020 United States redistricting cycle, the Arizona Independent Redistricting Commission (AIRC) redrew legislative district boundaries in Arizona. The 20th district was drawn as a majority Latino constituency, with 53% of residents being Hispanic or Latino. According to the AIRC, the district is outside of competitive range and considered leaning Democratic.

== Political representation ==
The district is represented in the 56th Arizona State Legislature, which convenes from January 1, 2023, to December 31, 2024, by Sally Ann Gonzales (D-Tucson) in the Arizona Senate and by Alma Hernandez (D-Tucson) and Betty Villegas (D-Tucson) in the Arizona House of Representatives.

On July 31, 2023, Betty Villegas was admitted into the House to fill the vacancy caused when Democratic Representative Andrés Cano resigned. (Note: Democratic Representative Andrés Cano resigned on July 4, 2023. Betty Villegas was appointed to fill the remainder of the unexpired term.)

| Name | Image | Residence | Office | Party |
|---|---|---|---|---|
| Sally Ann Gonzales | | Tucson | State senator | Democrat |
| Alma Hernandez | | Tucson | State representative | Democrat |
| Betty Villegas | | Tucson | State representative | Democrat |

== Election results ==
The 2022 elections were the first in the newly drawn district.

=== Arizona Senate ===
2022 Arizona's 20th Senate district election
| Party | Candidate | Votes | % |
|---|---|---|---|
| Democratic | Sally Ann Gonzales (incumbent) | 49,966 | 100 |
| Total votes | | 49,966 | 100 |
| Democratic hold | | | |

=== Arizona House of Representatives ===
2022 Arizona House of Representatives election, 20th district
| Party | Candidate | Votes | % |
|---|---|---|---|
| Democratic | Andrés Cano (incumbent) | 40,581 | 51.25 |
| Democratic | Alma Hernandez (incumbent) | 38,600 | 48.75 |
| Total votes | | 79,181 | 100.00 |
| Democratic hold | | | |
| Democratic hold | | | |

== See also ==
- List of Arizona legislative districts
- Arizona State Legislature
