= Barbara Blewster =

American politician

Member of the Arizona House of Representatives from the 1st district
- In office January 1999 – January 2001
- Preceded by: Donald R. Aldridge; Sue Lynch
- Succeeded by: Henry Camarot

Personal details
- Born: July 31, 1960 (age 66) Phoenix, Arizona
- Party: Republican
- Spouse: William
- Education: Arizona State University

Barbara Blewster (born July 31, 1960) is a former member of the Arizona House of Representatives. She served in the House from January 1999 through January 2001, representing district 1. She ran for a second term in 2000, but lost in the general election after making what were reported as "various comments about blacks, Indians, and Jews." Blewster's husband William is on the national council of the far-right John Birch Society.
