= 2000 United States Senate election in Arizona =

- November 7, 2000
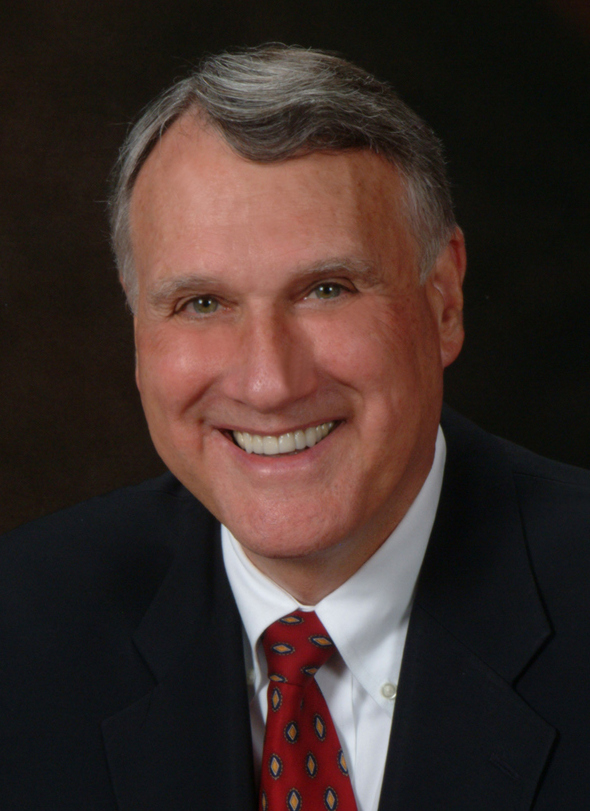

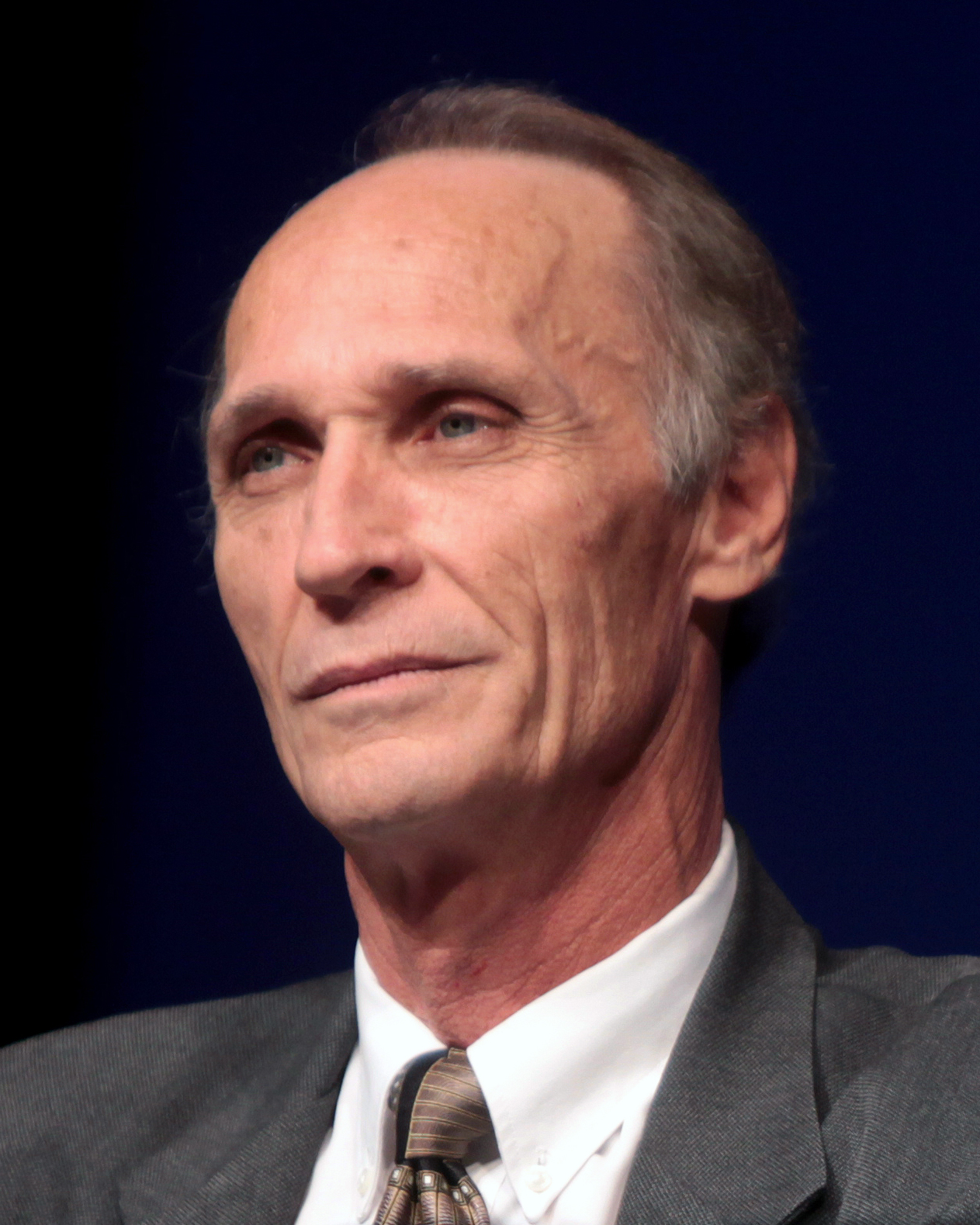
Nominee	Jon Kyl	William Toel
Party	Republican	Independent
Popular vote	1,101,196	109,230
Percentage	79.32%	7.82%
Nominee	Vance Hansen	Barry Hess
Party	Green	Libertarian
Popular vote	108,926	70,724
Percentage	7.80%	5.06%
- County results Kyl: 60–70% 70–80% 80–90%
U.S. senator before election
Jon Kyl
Republican
Elected U.S. Senator
Jon Kyl
Republican

The 2000 United States Senate election in Arizona was held on November 7, 2000. Incumbent Republican U.S. Senator Jon Kyl won re-election to a second term. No candidate was nominated from the Democratic Party. Independent Bill Toel, Green party nominee Vance Hansen, and Libertarian party nominee Barry Hess each got more than 5% of the vote, a strong non-major-party performance.

== Candidates ==
=== Green ===
- Vance Hansen, retired teacher

=== Independent ===
- Bill Toel, professor and former banker

=== Libertarian ===
- Barry Hess, businessman

=== Republican ===
- Jon Kyl, incumbent U.S. Senator first elected in 1994

== Campaign ==
Jon Kyl, a popular incumbent, did not draw a Democratic opponent despite being labeled as vulnerable at one point.

=== Results ===
General election results
Party	Candidate	Votes	%	±%
Republican	Jon Kyl (Incumbent)	1,108,196	79.32%	+25.61%
Independent	William Toel	109,230	7.82%	
Green	Vance Hansen	108,926	7.80%	
Libertarian	Barry Hess	70,724	5.06%	−1.69%
Majority		998,966	71.50%	+57.34%
Turnout		1,397,076		
Republican hold		Swing		

==== Results by county ====
County	Jon Kyl Republican		William Toel Independent		Vance Hansen Green		Barry Hess Libertarian		Margin		Total votes cast
County	#	%	#	%	#	%	#	%	#	%	Total votes cast
Apache	9,857	61.1%	2,376	14.7%	1,890	11.7%	2,011	12.5%	7,481	46.4%	16,134
Cochise	24,766	80.1%	2,128	6.9%	2,255	7.3%	1,752	5.7%	22,511	72.8% (Note: Compares margin over Hansen.)	30,901
Coconino	25,512	67.3%	3,297	8.7%	6,189	16.3%	2,887	7.6%	19,323	51.0%	37,885
Gila	13,549	81.2%	1,384	8.3%	819	4.9%	941	5.6%	12,165	72.9%	16,693
Graham	7,520	85.4%	585	6.6%	328	3.7%	375	4.3%	6,935	78.8%	8,808
Greenlee	2,135	81.3%	256	9.7%	93	3.5%	143	5.4%	1,879	71.6%	2,627
La Paz	3,484	82.1%	342	8.1%	190	4.5%	228	5.4%	3,142	74.0%	4,244
Maricopa	663,756	81.1%	68,387	8.4%	49,107	6.0%	36,847	4.5%	595,369	72.7%	818,097
Mohave	32,686	79.8%	4,309	10.5%	1,980	4.8%	1,972	4.8%	28,377	69.3%	40,947
Navajo	18,671	77.1%	2,070	8.6%	1,627	6.7%	1,835	7.6%	16,601	68.5%	24,203
Pima	198,266	75.9%	12,687	4.9%	25,081	13.4%	15,280	5.8%	163,185	62.5%	261,314
Pinal	30,134	78.9%	3,716	9.7%	2,145	5.6%	2,183	5.7%	26,418	69.2%	38,178
Santa Cruz	5,753	73.0%	853	10.8%	707	9.0%	563	7.1%	4,900	62.2%	7,876
Yavapai	50,815	80.2%	4,647	7.3%	5,334	8.4%	2,541	4.0%	45,481	71.8%	63,337
Yuma	21,292	82.4%	2,193	8.5%	1,181	4.6%	1,166	4.5%	19,099	73.9%	25,832
Totals	1,108,196	79.3%	109,230	7.8%	108,926	7.8%	70,724	5.1%	998,966	71.5%	1,397,076

County Flips: Republican Hold Flip

Counties that flipped from Democratic to Republican

- Apache (largest municipality: Eagar)
- Santa Cruz (largest municipality: Nogales)
- Coconino (largest municipality: Flagstaff)
- Pima (largest municipality: Tucson)

== See also ==
- 2000 United States Senate elections
