= Tom O'Halleran =

American politician (born 1946)

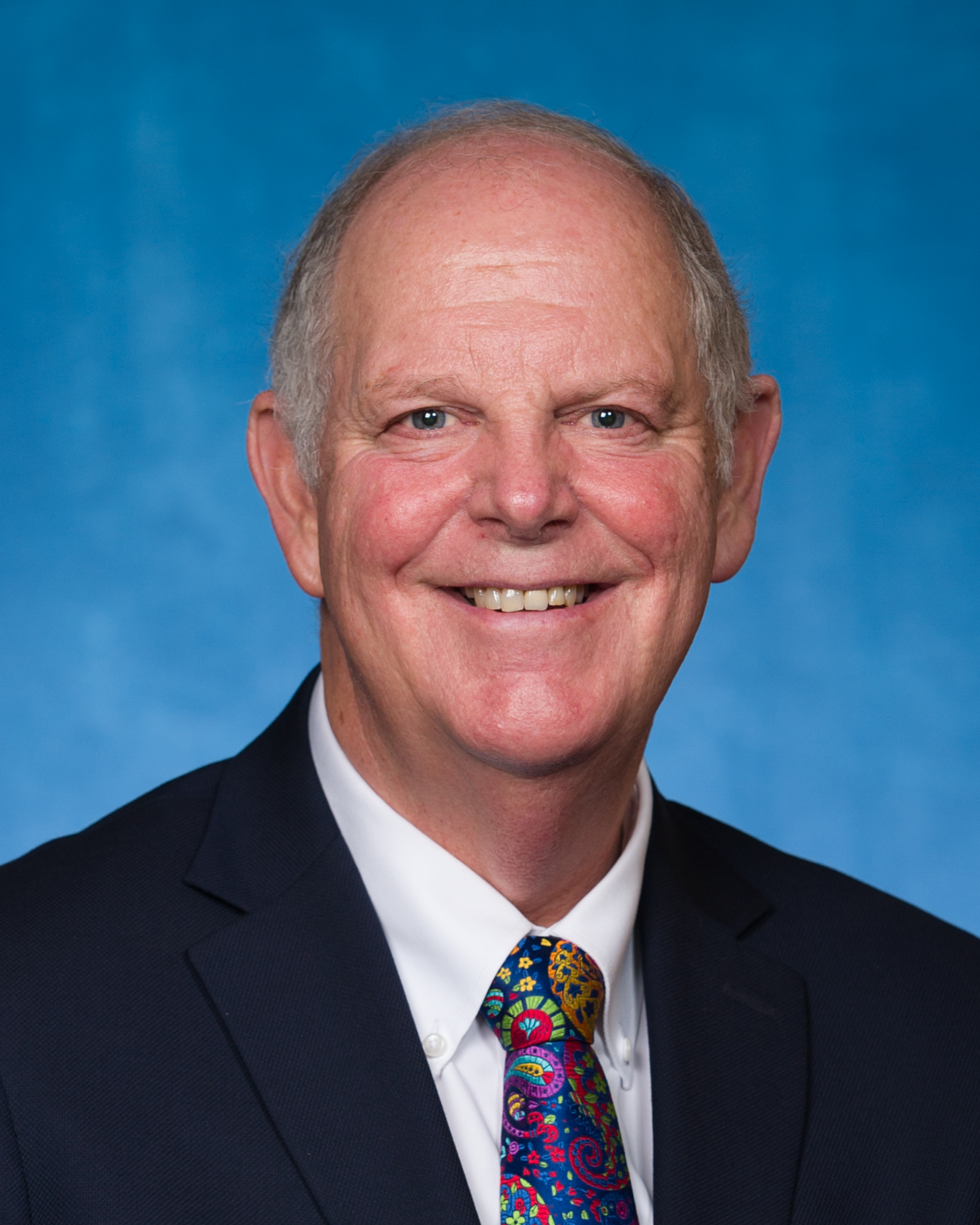
- Official portrait, 2016

Member of the U.S. House of Representatives from Arizona's 1st district
- In office January 3, 2017 – January 3, 2023
- Preceded by: Ann Kirkpatrick
- Succeeded by: Eli Crane (redistricted)

Member of the Arizona Senate from the 1st district
- In office January 8, 2007 – January 5, 2009
- Preceded by: Ken Bennett
- Succeeded by: Steve Pierce

Member of the Arizona House of Representatives
- In office January 3, 2001 – January 3, 2007 Serving with James Sedillo, Lucy Mason
- Preceded by: Joe Hart; John Verkamp
- Succeeded by: Andy Tobin
- Constituency: 2nd district (2001–2003); 1st district (2003–2007)

Personal details
- Born: Thomas Charles O'Halleran; January 24, 1946 (age 80) Chicago, Illinois, U.S.
- Party: Republican (before 2014); Independent (2014–2015); Democratic (2015–present)
- Spouse: Patricia Smeaton (m. 1969)

Thomas Charles O'Halleran (/oʊˈhælərən/; born January 24, 1946) is an American politician who served as the U.S. representative for Arizona's 1st congressional district from 2017 to 2023. Beginning his political career as a Republican, he was the Arizona state senator from the 1st district from 2007 to 2009. In 2015, he became a member of the Democratic Party. He also served as the chair of communications for the Blue Dog Coalition. On June 7, 2023, he was appointed as a senior advisor to the U.S. Department of Agriculture in the Joe Biden administration.

== Early life and education ==
O'Halleran was born and raised in Chicago, Illinois, and graduated from Providence St. Mel School. He attended Lewis University for one year before joining the Chicago Police Department. O'Halleran later attended DePaul University for one year.

== Early career ==
O'Halleran served with the Chicago Police Department from 1966 to 1975. He then became a member of the Chicago Board of Trade, operating his own futures trading business with a focus in futures contracts on 10-year U.S. Treasury notes.

=== Arizona Legislature ===
O'Halleran, then a Republican, served in the Arizona House of Representatives from 2001 to 2007. He then served in the Arizona State Senate, representing the 1st district from 2007 to 2009. In a 2008 primary election, he was unseated by Steve Pierce.

After leaving the Arizona legislature, O'Halleran hosted a radio show on KAZM in Sedona.

In 2014 he left the Republican Party, citing its policies on education, water, and child welfare. He then ran for the 6th district seat of the State Senate as an independent, losing by 3%.

== U.S. House of Representatives ==
=== Elections ===
==== 2016 ====
On August 6, 2015, O'Halleran announced his candidacy as a Democrat for Arizona's 1st congressional district.

He explained his switch of party affiliation as a result of his positive attitude toward government, and, in particular, of his support for government regulations that would increase the use of wind and solar energy.

In May 2016, O'Halleran was named to the Democratic Congressional Campaign Committee's Red to Blue list, indicating that his race was a priority for the group.

On August 30, 2016, O'Halleran beat Miguel Olivas in the Democratic primary. He defeated Republican Paul Babeu and Green Party candidate Ray Parrish in the general election with 51% of the vote.

==== 2018 ====
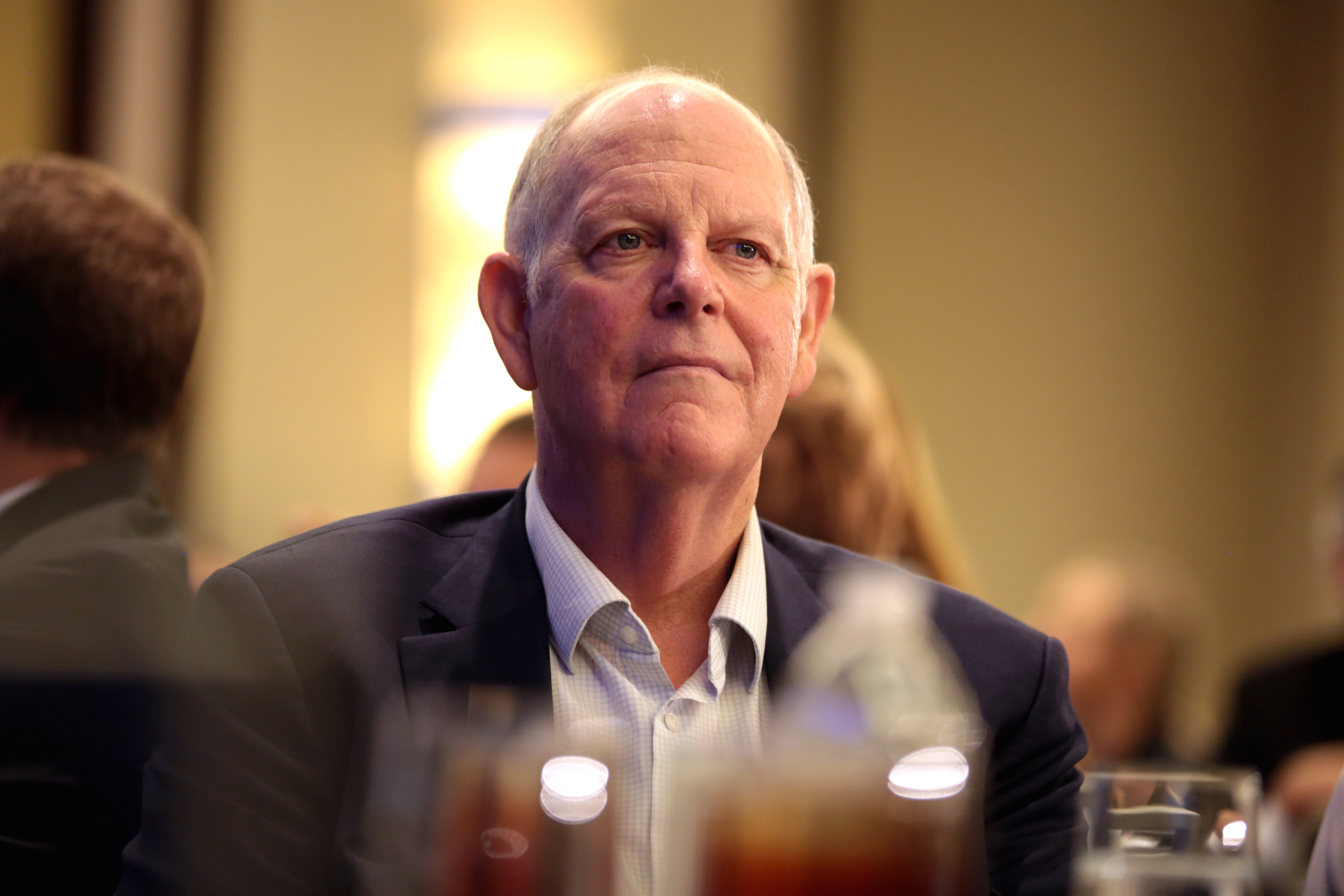
O'Halleran at the 2018 Arizona Manufacturing Summit in Phoenix, Arizona

O'Halleran ran unopposed in the Democratic primary. In the general election, he defeated Republican Wendy Rogers with 54% of the vote.

==== 2020 ====
O'Halleran was reelected, defeating Republican nominee Tiffany Shedd with 51.6% of the vote.

==== 2022 ====
In the 2021 decennial redistricting, O'Halleran's district was reshaped and renumbered as the 2nd congressional district and he ran for reelection there against Republican Eli Crane. The new district was made significantly more Republican than its predecessor, as it gained heavily Republican Prescott. O'Halleran lost to Crane in the general election, winning only in the district's most Democratic counties, Coconino and Apache.

=== Tenure ===
==== 117th Congress (2021–23) ====
O'Halleran was at the United States Capitol on January 6, 2021, to certify the results of the 2020 United States presidential election when the Capitol was stormed. He was moved to a safe location along with other members of Congress. He voted in support of a resolution calling for Vice President Mike Pence to use the Twenty-fifth Amendment to the United States Constitution to remove Trump from office. Days later, he voted for the second impeachment of Donald Trump.

In February, O'Halleran voted in support of the American Rescue Plan.

=== Committee assignments ===
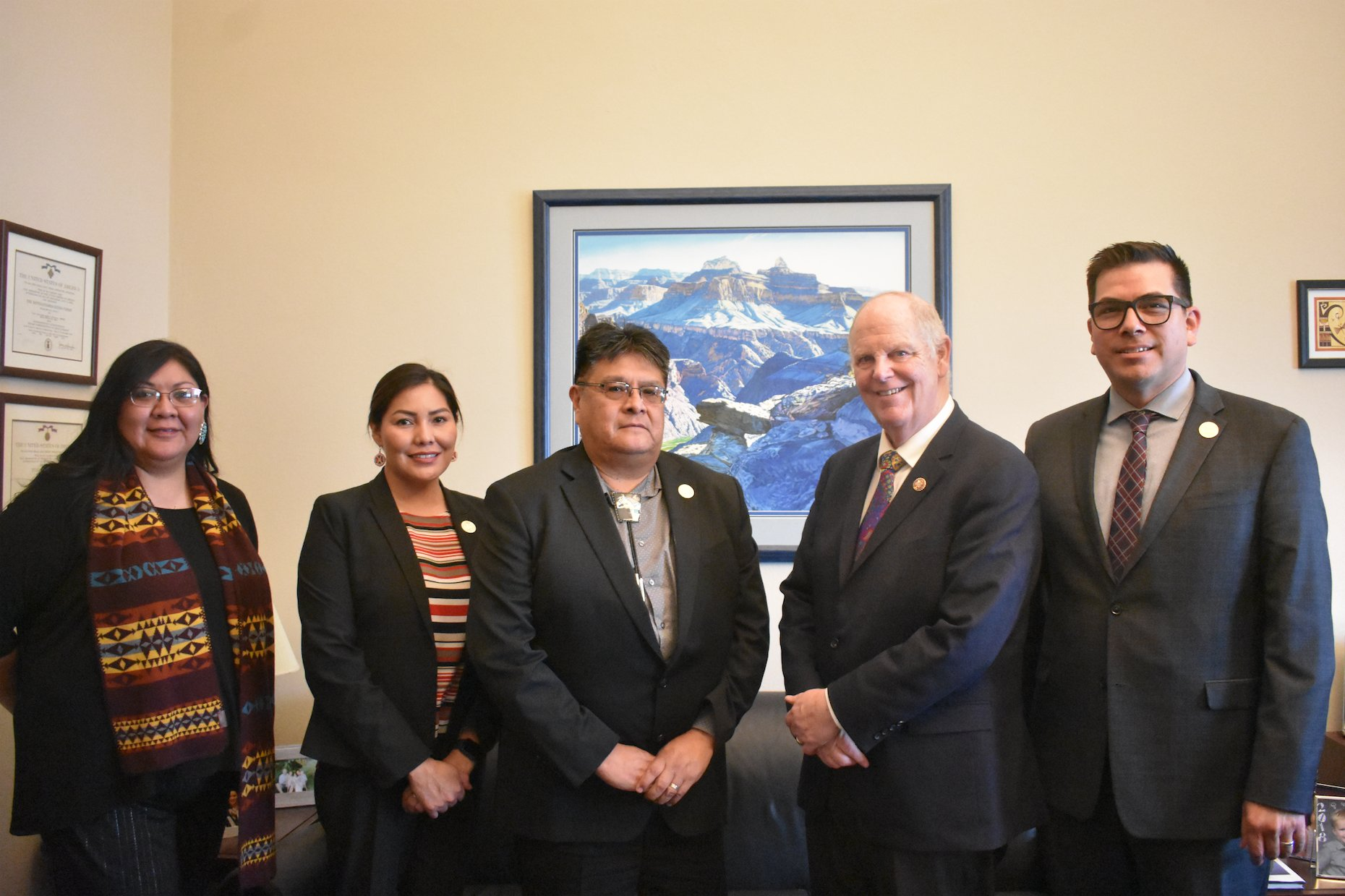
O'Halleran meeting with the Navajo Nation Housing Authority in 2020

- Committee on Agriculture
  - Subcommittee on Commodity Exchanges, Energy, and Credit
  - Subcommittee on Conservation and Forestry
  - Subcommittee on General Farm Commodities and Risk Management
- Committee on Energy and Commerce
  - Subcommittee on Communications and Technology
  - Subcommittee on Energy
  - Subcommittee on Consumer Protection and Commerce

=== Caucus memberships ===
- Blue Dog Coalition (chair for communications)
- New Democrat Coalition
- Congressional LGBT Equality Caucus
- Problem Solvers Caucus

== Political positions ==
As of November 2022, O'Halleran had voted in line with President Joe Biden's stated position 100% of the time. He was a chair of the Blue Dog Coalition.

=== Abortion ===
O'Halleran describes himself as pro-choice but has a mixed record on abortion issues. In the Arizona state senate, he voted in favor of a ban on abortion after 20 weeks. O'Halleran opposed the 2022 overturning of Roe v. Wade, calling it "a mammoth setback for women, families and our nation."

=== Energy and oil ===
According to On the Issues, in 2008 O'Halleran introduced HB 2613, an act that would give businesses using renewable energy property tax incentives.

=== Foreign policy ===
According to On the Issues, in 2017 O'Halleran endorsed a two-state solution despite Israeli settlements on the West Bank.

=== Government spending ===
In March 2018, O'Halleran criticized the Trump administration for seeking to cut funding for agencies and programs including the Economic Development Administration.

=== Gun policy ===
After the Stoneman Douglas High School shooting in Parkland, Florida, O'Halleran, who had long supported expanded background checks but opposed an assault-weapon ban, suggested he might shift toward a stronger position on gun control. He said: "At times you have to look at yourself in the mirror and do the right thing and say forget about the political consequences."

=== Immigration ===
When Trump ordered a travel ban on visitors and refugees from seven predominantly Muslim nations in January 2017, O'Halleran said that the order "does not represent our nation's values" and that it violated the Constitution and "the bedrock ideals of our democracy".

In April 2017, O'Halleran criticized Attorney General Jeff Sessions's tougher new guidelines on expelling illegal immigrants who belong to criminal gangs. He said: "I have no problem with getting the felons out of the country. But some of these people that they're taking out of the country, they have children that are Americans, and they have not had a violent felony conviction. Here we are, taking mothers away from their children."

O'Halleran was part of a group of Arizona Democrats who, in an August 2017 letter to Trump, urged him not to pardon former Maricopa County chief Sheriff Joe Arpaio, who had been convicted in a federal court of racially profiling Latinos as part of border patrols.

=== Qualified immunity ===
In 2021, O'Halleran was among a group of Democrats who sought to remove a provision from a police reform bill that would end qualified immunity for police officers accused of misconduct.

== Personal life ==
O'Halleran and his wife Pat live in unincorporated Yavapai County (with a Sedona address). They have three grown children and four grandchildren. O'Halleran is Roman Catholic.

On June 7, 2023, O'Halleran was named Senior Advisor for the Natural Resources Conservation Service of the U.S. Department of Agriculture.

== Electoral history ==
2016 Arizona's 1st Congressional District Election
Party	Candidate	Votes	%	±%
Democratic	Tom O'Halleran	142,219	50.7%	
Republican	Paul Babeu	121,745	43.3%	
Green	Ray Parrish	16,746	6.0%	
Majority		20,474	7.4%	
Total votes		280,710	100.0	
Democratic hold				

2018 Arizona's 1st Congressional District Election
Party	Candidate	Votes	%	±%
Democratic	Tom O'Halleran (Incumbent)	143,240	53.8%	
Republican	Wendy Rogers	122,784	46.2%	
Majority		20,456	7.6%	
Total votes		266,024	100.0	
Democratic hold				

2020 Arizona's 1st Congressional District Election
Party	Candidate	Votes	%	±%
Democratic	Tom O'Halleran (Incumbent)	188,469	51.6%	−2.2
Republican	Tiffany Shedd	176,709	48.4%	+2.2
Total votes		365,178	100.0	
Democratic hold				

2022 Arizona's 2nd Congressional District Election
Party	Candidate	Votes	%
Republican	Eli Crane	174,169	53.9
Democratic	Tom O'Halleran (incumbent)	149,151	46.1
Independent	Chris Sarappo (write-in)	76	0.0
Total votes		323,396	100.0
Republican gain from Democratic			

U.S. House of Representatives
Preceded by Ann Kirkpatrick	Member of the U.S. House of Representatives from Arizona's 1st congressional district 2017–2023	Succeeded by David Schweikert
Party political offices
Preceded by Dan Lipinski	Chair of the Blue Dog Coalition for Policy; 2019–2021; Served alongside: Stephanie Murphy (Administration), Lou Correa (Communications)	Succeeded by Ed Case
Preceded by Lou Correa	Chair of the Blue Dog Coalition for Communications; 2021–2023; Served alongside: Stephanie Murphy (Administration), Ed Case (Policy)	Succeeded by Jared Golden as Chair of the Blue Dog Coalition for Administration and Communications
U.S. order of precedence (ceremonial)
Preceded by Rick Renzi as Former U.S. Representative	Order of precedence of the United States as Former U.S. Representative	Succeeded by Debbie Lesko as Former U.S. Representative
