= James Kraft (politician) =

American politician

Member of the Arizona House of Representatives from the 14th district
- In office January 2001 – January 2003
- Preceded by: Susan Muir Gerard; Barry Wong

Personal details
- Born: May 6, 1941 (age 85) Denison, Texas
- Party: Republican
- Profession: Politician

James Kraft (born May 6, 1941) is a former member of the Arizona House of Representatives. He served in the House from January 2001 through January 2003, serving district 18. After redistricting in 2002, he ran for re-election in District 10, but lost in the Republican primary to Linda Gray and Doug Quelland.
