= Mark A. Clark (politician) =

American politician (born 1967)

Mark A. Clark (born March 8, 1967, in San Manuel, Arizona) is a member of the Democratic Party.

He was a state representative in the Arizona House of Representatives' 45th Legislature (District 07) from 2001 to 2002. His father, Harry Clark, was a state representative from 1992 to 2000.

In 2003, Republican Jim Waring became representative of District 07.
