= Jeff Hatch-Miller =

American politician

Jeff Hatch-Miller served as the Executive Director of the Arizona State Lottery from 2009 to 2015, the longest term of service of any chief executive officer to date. Under his leadership, Arizona Lottery ticket sales increased by nearly $260 million, over 50%, and the Arizona Lottery ranked in the top 10 nationally for percentage increases in sales each year.

Hatch-Miller served on the Arizona Corporation Commission from 2003 until 2009, and as Chairman during 2005 and 2006.

His leadership as Chairman was a key reason the Arizona Corporation Commission was considered one of the most competent and effective commissions in state history. As a member of the Arizona Corporation Commission, Jeff Hatch-Miller, worked to decrease investment fraud and to increase public awareness of "investment scams." In the Commission's role as regulator of public utilities (electricity, water, natural gas, telecommunications) he led the fight for reliable service, affordable rates, and protection of personal information held by the utility.

Before his election to the Corporation Commission in 2002, Hatch-Miller served in the Arizona House of Representatives for two terms (1999–2003), chairing the House Energy, Utilities and Technology Committee. Hatch-Miller was known from his straightforward, inclusionary style of addressing public policy issues. He was honored as national "Freshman Legislator of the Year 2000" by the National Republican Legislators Association.

Technologically knowledgeable, Jeff Hatch-Miller led the way to putting Arizona government on the Internet. As a Legislator Hatch-Miller also worked to lower gasoline prices, bringing in petroleum company leaders, energy experts, and gasoline dealers to find ways to decrease gasoline prices. He championed efforts in Arizona, and in Washington D.C., that eventually led to the adoption of the "Do Not Call List", one of the most popular programs offered by government, an important step toward stopping the majority of unwanted telemarketing calls.

He lives with his wife, Anita Hatch-Miller, in Prescott, Arizona. His son, Mark Hatch-Miller is an attorney in private practice in New York, and his son Robert Hatch-Miller lives and works in Los Angeles, California, as a film producer.
