= Henry Camarot =

American politician

Member of the Arizona House of Representatives from the 1st district
- In office January 2001 – January 2003
- Preceded by: Barbara Blewster

Personal details
- Party: Democratic
- Profession: Politician

Henry Camarot is a former member of the Arizona House of Representatives. He served in the House from January 2001 through January 2003.
