= James Sedillo =

American politician

Member of the Arizona House of Representatives from the 2nd district
- In office January 2001 – January 2003
- Preceded by: Joe Hart; John Verkamp

Personal details
- Party: Democratic
- Profession: Politician

James Sedillo is a former member of the Arizona House of Representatives. He served in the House from January 2001 through January 2003. He ran for re-election in 2002, but lost in the Democratic primary.
