= 1978 Arizona Senate election =

- November 7, 1978

All 30 seats of the Arizona Senate 16 seats needed for a majority
	Majority party	Minority party
Party	Republican	Democratic
Seats before	14	16
Seats after	16	14
Seat change	▲2	▼2
Senate President before election
Ed C. Sawyer
Democratic
Elected Senate President
Leo Corbet
Republican

The 1978 Arizona Senate election was held on November 7, 1978. Voters elected members of the Arizona Senate in all 30 of the state's legislative districts to serve a two-year term. Primary elections were held on September 12, 1978.

Prior to the elections, the Democrats held a majority of 16 seats over the Republicans' 14 seats.

Following the election, Republicans flipped control of the chamber and took a majority of 16 Republicans to 14 Democrats, a net gain of two seats for Republicans.

The newly elected senators served in the 34th Arizona State Legislature.

== Retiring Incumbents ==
=== Democrat ===
1. District 11: Frank J. Felix

== Incumbents Defeated in Primary Elections ==
=== Democrats ===
1. District 2: Dr. Lewis J. McDonald
2. District 10: Tom Moore

== Incumbents Defeated in General Elections ==
=== Democrats ===
1. District 9: John J. Hutton
2. District 12: Sue Dye
3. District 16: Marcia Weeks

=== Republican ===
1. District 21: Tim Hayes

== Summary of Results by Arizona State Legislative District ==
District	Incumbent	Party	Elected Senator	Outcome
1st	Boyd Tenney	Rep	Boyd Tenney	Rep Hold
2nd	Lewis J. McDonald	Dem	Tony Gabaldon	Dem Hold
3rd	Arthur J. Hubbard Sr.	Dem	Arthur J. Hubbard Sr.	Dem Hold
4th	A.V. "Bill" Hardt	Dem	A.V. "Bill" Hardt	Dem Hold
5th	Jones Osborn	Dem	Jones Osborn	Dem Hold
6th	Polly Getzwiller	Dem	Polly Getzwiller	Dem Hold
7th	William L. Swink	Dem	William L. Swink	Dem Hold
8th	Ed Sawyer	Dem	Ed Sawyer	Dem Hold
9th	John J. Hutton	Dem	Jeffrey J. Hill	Rep Gain
10th	Tom Moore	Dem	Luis A. Gonzales	Dem Hold
11th	Frank J. Felix	Dem	Jaime P. Gutierrez	Dem Hold
12th	Sue Dye	Dem	John T. Mawhinney	Rep Gain
13th	Morris Farr	Dem	Morris Farr	Dem Hold
14th	Jim Kolbe	Rep	Jim Kolbe	Rep Hold
15th	S.H. "Hal" Runyan	Rep	S.H. "Hal" Runyan	Rep Hold
16th	Marcia Weeks	Dem	Wayne Stump	Rep Gain
17th	Anne Lindeman	Rep	Anne Lindeman	Rep Hold
18th	Leo Corbet	Rep	Leo Corbet	Rep Hold
19th	Ray Rottas	Rep	Ray Rottas	Rep Hold
20th	Lela Alston	Dem	Lela Alston	Dem Hold
21st	Timothy D. Hayes	Rep	Richard Kimball	Dem Gain
22nd	Manuel "Lito" Peña	Dem	Manuel "Lito" Peña	Dem Hold
23rd	Alfredo Gutierrez	Dem	Alfredo Gutierrez	Dem Hold
24th	John C. Pritzlaff Jr.	Rep	John C. Pritzlaff Jr.	Rep Hold
25th	Trudy Camping	Rep	Trudy Camping	Rep Hold
26th	Rod J. McMullin	Rep	Rod J. McMullin	Rep Hold
27th	James A. (Jim) Mack	Rep	James A. (Jim) Mack	Rep Hold
28th	Robert B. Usdane	Rep	Robert B. Usdane	Rep Hold
29th	Jack J. Taylor	Rep	Jack J. Taylor	Rep Hold
30th	Stan Turley	Rep	Stan Turley	Rep Hold

== Detailed Results ==
=== District 1 ===
Republican primary results
Party	Candidate	Votes	%
Republican	Boyd Tenney (incumbent)	5,104	56.88%
Republican	Sam Steiger	3,869	43.12%
Total votes		8,973	100.00%

General election results
Party	Candidate	Votes	%
Republican	Boyd Tenney (incumbent)	18,573	100.00%
Total votes		18,573	100.00%
Republican hold			

=== District 2 ===
Democratic primary results
Party	Candidate	Votes	%
Democratic	Tony Gabaldon	3,480	57.30%
Democratic	Dr. Lewis J. McDonald (incumbent)	2,593	42.70%
Total votes		6,073	100.00%

General election results
Party	Candidate	Votes	%
Democratic	Tony Gabaldon	11,269	100.00%
Total votes		11,269	100.00%
Democratic hold			

=== District 3 ===
Democratic primary results
Party	Candidate	Votes	%
Democratic	Arthur J. Hubbard, Sr. (incumbent)	4,552	100.00%
Total votes		4,552	100.00%

General election results
Party	Candidate	Votes	%
Democratic	Arthur J. Hubbard, Sr. (incumbent)	10,424	100.00%
Total votes		10,424	100.00%
Democratic hold			

=== District 4 ===
Democratic primary results
Party	Candidate	Votes	%
Democratic	A. V. "Bill" Hardt (incumbent)	8,574	100.00%
Total votes		8,574	100.00%

Republican primary results
Party	Candidate	Votes	%
Republican	Dennis I. Davis	2,727	100.00%
Total votes		2,727	100.00%

General election results
Party	Candidate	Votes	%
Democratic	A. V. "Bill" Hardt (incumbent)	11,788	59.92%
Republican	Dennis I. Davis	7,885	40.08%
Total votes		19,673	100.00%
Democratic hold			

=== District 5 ===
Democratic primary results
Party	Candidate	Votes	%
Democratic	Jones Osborn (incumbent)	4,545	100.00%
Total votes		4,545	100.00%

General election results
Party	Candidate	Votes	%
Democratic	Jones Osborn (incumbent)	8,800	100.00%
Total votes		8,800	100.00%
Democratic hold			

=== District 6 ===
Democratic primary results
Party	Candidate	Votes	%
Democratic	Polly Getzwiller (incumbent)	3,751	66.97%
Democratic	R. G. "Danny" Pena	1,850	33.03%
Total votes		5,601	100.00%

General election results
Party	Candidate	Votes	%
Democratic	Polly Getzwiller (incumbent)	8,520	100.00%
Total votes		8,520	100.00%
Democratic hold			

=== District 7 ===
Democratic primary results
Party	Candidate	Votes	%
Democratic	William L. Swink (incumbent)	4,451	100.00%
Total votes		4,451	100.00%

General election results
Party	Candidate	Votes	%
Democratic	William L. Swink (incumbent)	9,219	100.00%
Total votes		9,219	100.00%
Democratic hold			

=== District 8 ===
Democratic primary results
Party	Candidate	Votes	%
Democratic	Ed C. Sawyer (incumbent)	9,089	100.00%
Total votes		9,089	100.00%

General election results
Party	Candidate	Votes	%
Democratic	Ed C. Sawyer (incumbent)	13,559	100.00%
Total votes		13,559	100.00%
Democratic hold			

=== District 9 ===
Democratic primary results
Party	Candidate	Votes	%
Democratic	John J. Hutton (incumbent)	3,582	100.00%
Total votes		3,582	100.00%

Republican primary results
Party	Candidate	Votes	%
Republican	Jeffrey J. Hill	2,524	73.01%
Republican	Hercules V. Galie	933	26.99%
Total votes		3,457	100.00%

General election results
Party	Candidate	Votes	%
Republican	Jeffrey J. Hill	9,361	54.18%
Democratic	John J. Hutton (incumbent)	7,915	45.82%
Total votes		17,276	100.00%
Republican gain from Democratic			

=== District 10 ===
Democratic primary results
Party	Candidate	Votes	%
Democratic	Luis Armando Gonzales	1,905	51.74%
Democratic	Tom Moore (incumbent)	1,777	48.26%
Total votes		3,682	100.00%

Republican primary results
Party	Candidate	Votes	%
Republican	Roy E. Woods	387	100.00%
Total votes		387	100.00%

Libertarian Primary Results
Party	Candidate	Votes	%
Libertarian	Diane Crouch	8	100.00%
Total votes		8	100.00%

General election results
Party	Candidate	Votes	%
Democratic	Luis Armando Gonzales	5,605	66.51%
Republican	Roy E. Woods	2,108	25.01%
Libertarian	Diane Crouch	387	4.59%
Independent	Lorenzo Torrez	327	3.88%
Total votes		8,427	100.00%
Democratic hold			

=== District 11 ===
Democratic primary results
Party	Candidate	Votes	%
Democratic	Jaime P. Gutierrez	2,256	51.25%
Democratic	Joe Castillo	1,610	36.57%
Democratic	Caroline P. Killeen	536	12.18%
Total votes		4,402	100.00%

General election results
Party	Candidate	Votes	%
Democratic	Jaime P. Gutierrez	9,241	82.13%
Independent	Emil S. Sasiadek	2,010	17.87%
Total votes		11,251	100.00%
Democratic hold			

=== District 12 ===
Democratic primary results
Party	Candidate	Votes	%
Democratic	Sue Dye (incumbent)	3,858	100.00%
Total votes		3,858	100.00%

Republican primary results
Party	Candidate	Votes	%
Republican	John T. Mawhinney	2,472	100.00%
Total votes		2,472	100.00%

General election results
Party	Candidate	Votes	%
Republican	John T. Mawhinney	11,908	55.64%
Democratic	Sue Dye (incumbent)	9,493	44.36%
Total votes		21,401	100.00%
Republican gain from Democratic			

=== District 13 ===
Democratic primary results
Party	Candidate	Votes	%
Democratic	Morris Farr (incumbent)	3,606	100.00%
Total votes		3,606	100.00%

Republican primary results
Party	Candidate	Votes	%
Republican	Greg Lunn	1,917	53.79%
Republican	James W. "Jim" Cocke	1,647	46.21%
Total votes		3,564	100.00%

Libertarian Primary Results
Party	Candidate	Votes	%
Libertarian	Wilfred "Bill" Olschewski	16	100.00%
Total votes		16	100.00%

General election results
Party	Candidate	Votes	%
Democratic	Morris Farr (incumbent)	9,740	49.67%
Republican	Greg Lunn	9,371	47.79%
Libertarian	Wilfred "Bill" Olschewski	498	2.54%
Total votes		19,609	100.00%
Democratic hold			

=== District 14 ===
Republican primary results
Party	Candidate	Votes	%
Republican	Jim Kolbe (incumbent)	3,041	100.00%
Total votes		3,041	100.00%

General election results
Party	Candidate	Votes	%
Republican	Jim Kolbe (incumbent)	18,192	100.00%
Total votes		18,192	100.00%
Republican hold			

=== District 15 ===
Republican primary results
Party	Candidate	Votes	%
Republican	S. H. "Hal" Runyan (incumbent)	4,057	66.55%
Republican	Ken Parker	2,039	33.45%
Total votes		6,096	100.00%

General election results
Party	Candidate	Votes	%
Republican	S. H. "Hal" Runyan (incumbent)	14,574	100.00%
Total votes		14,574	100.00%
Republican hold			

=== District 16 ===
Democratic primary results
Party	Candidate	Votes	%
Democratic	Marcia Weeks (incumbent)	4,072	100.00%
Total votes		4,072	100.00%

Republican primary results
Party	Candidate	Votes	%
Republican	Dr. Wayne Stump	2,474	44.69%
Republican	Archie E. Doss	2,296	41.47%
Republican	Greg Tripoli	766	13.84%
Total votes		5,536	100.00%

Libertarian Primary Results
Party	Candidate	Votes	%
Libertarian	James C. Cameron	17	100.00%
Total votes		17	100.00%

General election results
Party	Candidate	Votes	%
Republican	Dr. Wayne Stump	12,254	50.42%
Democratic	Marcia Weeks (incumbent)	10,929	44.97%
Libertarian	James C. Cameron	1,121	4.61%
Total votes		24,304	100.00%
Republican gain from Democratic			

=== District 17 ===
Republican primary results
Party	Candidate	Votes	%
Republican	Anne Lindeman (incumbent)	7,327	100.00%
Total votes		7,327	100.00%

General election results
Party	Candidate	Votes	%
Republican	Anne Lindeman (incumbent)	20,779	100.00%
Total votes		20,779	100.00%
Republican hold			

=== District 18 ===
Democratic primary results
Party	Candidate	Votes	%
Democratic	Phyllis G. Rowe	2,698	100.00%
Total votes		2,698	100.00%

Republican primary results
Party	Candidate	Votes	%
Republican	Leo Corbet (incumbent)	4,287	100.00%
Total votes		4,287	100.00%

Libertarian Primary Results
Party	Candidate	Votes	%
Libertarian	Kathi O'Connell	12	100.00%
Total votes		12	100.00%

General election results
Party	Candidate	Votes	%
Republican	Leo Corbet (incumbent)	9,901	59.99%
Democratic	Phyllis G. Rowe	5,691	34.48%
Libertarian	Kathi O'Connell	913	5.53%
Total votes		16,505	100.00%
Republican hold			

=== District 19 ===
Democratic primary results
Party	Candidate	Votes	%
Democratic	Helen Kalnitz (Note: Ran a write-in campaign.)	120	100.00%
Total votes		120	100.00%

Republican primary results
Party	Candidate	Votes	%
Republican	Ray Rottas (incumbent)	4,536	100.00%
Total votes		4,536	100.00%

General election results
Party	Candidate	Votes	%
Republican	Ray Rottas (incumbent)	12,676	100.00%
Total votes		12,676	100.00%
Republican hold			

=== District 20 ===
Democratic primary results
Party	Candidate	Votes	%
Democratic	Lela Alston (incumbent)	3,133	100.00%
Total votes		3,133	100.00%

Republican primary results
Party	Candidate	Votes	%
Republican	George Hussey	2,380	100.00%
Total votes		2,380	100.00%

General election results
Party	Candidate	Votes	%
Democratic	Lela Alston (incumbent)	7,768	59.52%
Republican	George Hussey	5,283	40.48%
Total votes		13,051	100.00%
Democratic hold			

=== District 21 ===
Democratic primary results
Party	Candidate	Votes	%
Democratic	Richard Kimball	2,846	100.00%
Total votes		2,846	100.00%

Republican primary results
Party	Candidate	Votes	%
Republican	Tim Hayes (incumbent)	3,125	100.00%
Total votes		3,125	100.00%

Libertarian Primary Results
Party	Candidate	Votes	%
Libertarian	Don Stott	10	100.00%
Total votes		10	100.00%

General election results
Party	Candidate	Votes	%
Democratic	Richard Kimball	6,851	50.77%
Republican	Tim Hayes (incumbent)	6,211	46.03%
Libertarian	Don Stott	432	3.20%
Total votes		13,494	100.00%
Democratic gain from Republican			

=== District 22 ===
Democratic primary results
Party	Candidate	Votes	%
Democratic	Manuel "Lito" Peña Jr. (incumbent)	1,663	52.58%
Democratic	Sue Perkins	894	28.26%
Democratic	Leon Thompson Jr.	606	19.16%
Total votes		3,163	100.00%

General election results
Party	Candidate	Votes	%
Democratic	Manuel "Lito" Peña Jr. (incumbent)	5,672	100.00%
Total votes		5,672	100.00%
Democratic hold			

=== District 23 ===
Democratic primary results
Party	Candidate	Votes	%
Democratic	Alfredo Gutierrez (incumbent)	1,933	72.97%
Democratic	Frances F. Ford	444	16.76%
Democratic	Samuel Wesley	272	10.27%
Total votes		2,649	100.00%

Republican primary results
Party	Candidate	Votes	%
Republican	Bennie Joe (Bossa Nova) Brown	203	100.00%
Total votes		203	100.00%

General election results
Party	Candidate	Votes	%
Democratic	Alfredo Gutierrez (incumbent)	3,790	80.78%
Republican	Bennie Joe (Bossa-Nova) Brown	902	19.22%
Total votes		4,692	100.00%
Democratic hold			

=== District 24 ===
Democratic primary results
Party	Candidate	Votes	%
Democratic	Jean Reed Roberts	2,145	47.21%
Democratic	James McCullough	1,472	32.39%
Democratic	Tim Rockey	927	20.40%
Total votes		4,544	100.00%

Republican primary results
Party	Candidate	Votes	%
Republican	John C. Pritzlaff Jr. (incumbent)	7,377	74.55%
Republican	Phil Morgan	2,519	25.45%
Total votes		9,896	100.00%

Libertarian Primary Results
Party	Candidate	Votes	%
Libertarian	Randy Dana Paulsen	16	100.00%
Total votes		16	100.00%

General election results
Party	Candidate	Votes	%
Republican	John C. Pritzlaff Jr. (incumbent)	23,826	65.76%
Democratic	Jean Reed Roberts	10,713	29.57%
Libertarian	Randy Dana Paulsen	1,691	4.67%
Total votes		36,230	100.00%
Republican hold			

=== District 25 ===
Democratic primary results
Party	Candidate	Votes	%
Democratic	Jerri Pastor	2,027	58.36%
Democratic	Tim Evens	1,446	41.64%
Total votes		3,473	100.00%

Republican primary results
Party	Candidate	Votes	%
Republican	Trudy Camping (incumbent)	2,594	100.00%
Total votes		2,594	100.00%

Libertarian Primary Results
Party	Candidate	Votes	%
Libertarian	Michael C. Monson	6	100.00%
Total votes		6	100.00%

General election results
Party	Candidate	Votes	%
Republican	Trudy Camping (incumbent)	6,931	53.83%
Democratic	Jerri Pastor	5,419	42.09%
Libertarian	Michael C. Monson	525	4.08%
Total votes		12,875	100.00%
Republican hold			

=== District 26 ===
Democratic primary results
Party	Candidate	Votes	%
Democratic	E. C. Hochwald (Note: Ran a write-in campaign.)	201	100.00%
Total votes		201	100.00%

Republican primary results
Party	Candidate	Votes	%
Republican	Rod McMullin (incumbent)	3,824	100.00%
Total votes		3,824	100.00%

Libertarian Primary Results
Party	Candidate	Votes	%
Libertarian	Leona Kroger	10	100.00%
Total votes		10	100.00%

General election results
Party	Candidate	Votes	%
Republican	Rod McMullin (incumbent)	11,933	81.78%
Libertarian	Leona Kroger	2,659	18.22%
Total votes		14,592	100.00%
Republican hold			

=== District 27 ===
Democratic primary results
Party	Candidate	Votes	%
Democratic	Bob Ashe	3,264	100.00%
Total votes		3,264	100.00%

Republican primary results
Party	Candidate	Votes	%
Republican	James A. "Jim" Mack (incumbent)	4,628	100.00%
Total votes		4,628	100.00%

Libertarian Primary Results
Party	Candidate	Votes	%
Libertarian	Leanna F. Garrison	11	100.00%
Total votes		11	100.00%

General election results
Party	Candidate	Votes	%
Republican	James A. "Jim" Mack (incumbent)	12,463	57.02%
Democratic	Bob Ashe	8,305	38.00%
Libertarian	Leanna F. Garrison	1,088	4.98%
Total votes		21,856	100.00%
Republican hold			

=== District 28 ===
Democratic primary results
Party	Candidate	Votes	%
Democratic	Imogene (Gene) Moore	2,052	100.00%
Total votes		2,052	100.00%

Republican primary results
Party	Candidate	Votes	%
Republican	Robert B. Usdane (incumbent)	2,432	40.45%
Republican	Steve Birringer	2,141	35.61%
Republican	George Broderick	1,440	23.95%
Total votes		6,013	100.00%

Libertarian Primary Results
Party	Candidate	Votes	%
Libertarian	Sumner D. Dodge	6	100.00%
Total votes		6	100.00%

General election results
Party	Candidate	Votes	%
Republican	Robert B. Usdane (incumbent)	12,639	66.91%
Democratic	Imogene (Gene) Moore	5,442	28.81%
Libertarian	Sumner D. Dodge	808	4.28%
Total votes		18,889	100.00%
Republican hold			

=== District 29 ===
Democratic primary results
Party	Candidate	Votes	%
Democratic	George E. Claseman	1,691	100.00%
Total votes		1,691	100.00%

Republican primary results
Party	Candidate	Votes	%
Republican	Jack J. Taylor (incumbent)	4,122	100.00%
Total votes		4,122	100.00%

General election results
Party	Candidate	Votes	%
Republican	Jack J. Taylor (incumbent)	12,109	77.39%
Democratic	George E. Claseman	3,537	22.61%
Total votes		15,646	100.00%
Republican hold			

=== District 30 ===
Republican primary results
Party	Candidate	Votes	%
Republican	Stan Turley (incumbent)	5,659	100.00%
Total votes		5,659	100.00%

General election results
Party	Candidate	Votes	%
Republican	Stan Turley (incumbent)	19,666	100.00%
Total votes		19,666	100.00%
Republican hold			
