= 1982 Arizona Senate election =

- November 2, 1982

All 30 seats of the Arizona Senate 16 seats needed for a majority
	Majority party	Minority party
Leader	Stan Turley	Jones Osborn
Party	Republican	Democratic
Leader's seat	30th	5th
Seats before	16	14
Seats after	18	12
Seat change	▲2	▼2
Senate President before election
Leo Corbet
Republican
Elected Senate President
Stan Turley
Republican

The 1982 Arizona Senate election was held on November 2, 1982. Voters elected members of the Arizona Senate in all 30 of the state's legislative districts to serve a two-year term. Primary elections were held on September 7, 1982.

Prior to the elections, the Republicans held a majority of 16 seats over the Democrats' 14 seats.

Following the election, Republicans maintained control of the chamber with 18 Republicans to 12 Democrats, a net gain of two seats for Republicans.

The newly elected senators served in the 36th Arizona State Legislature.

== Retiring Incumbents ==
=== Democrat ===
1. District 21: Richard Kimball

=== Republicans ===
1. District 1: Boyd Tenney
2. District 14: Jim Kolbe
3. District 18: Leo Corbet
4. District 19: Ray Rottas
5. District 24: John C. Pritzlaff Jr.
6. District 27: James A. "Jim" Mack

== Incumbents Defeated in Primary Elections ==
=== Democrat ===
1. District 7: Bill Swink

== Incumbents Defeated in General Elections ==
=== Democrat ===
1. District 16: Marcia G. Weeks

== Summary of Results by Arizona State Legislative District ==
District	Incumbent	Party	Elected Senator	Outcome
1st	Boyd Tenney	Rep	John U. Hays	Rep Hold
2nd	Tony Gabaldon	Dem	Tony Gabaldon	Dem Hold
3rd	Arthur J. Hubbard Sr.	Dem	Arthur J. Hubbard Sr.	Dem Hold
4th	A.V. "Bill" Hardt	Dem	A.V. "Bill" Hardt	Dem Hold
5th	Jones Osborn	Dem	Jones Osborn	Dem Hold
6th	Polly Getzwiller	Dem	Polly Getzwiller	Dem Hold
7th	William L. Swink	Dem	Peter D. Rios	Dem Hold
8th	Ed C. Sawyer	Dem	Ed C. Sawyer	Dem Hold
9th	Jeffrey J. Hill	Rep	Jeffrey J. Hill	Rep Hold
10th	Luis Armando Gonzales	Dem	Luis Armando Gonzales	Dem Hold
11th	Jaime P. Gutierrez	Dem	Jaime P. Gutierrez	Dem Hold
12th	John T. Mawhinney	Rep	John T. Mawhinney	Rep Hold
13th	Greg Lunn	Rep	Greg Lunn	Rep Hold
14th	Jim Kolbe	Rep	William J. "Bill" DeLong	Rep Hold
15th	S.H. "Hal" Runyan	Rep	S.H. "Hal" Runyan	Rep Hold
16th	Marcia G. Weeks	Dem	Wayne Stump	Rep Gain
17th	Anne Lindeman	Rep	Anne Lindeman	Rep Hold
18th	Leo Corbet	Rep	Tony West	Rep Hold
19th	Ray Rottas	Rep	Bill Davis	Rep Hold
20th	Lela Alston	Dem	Lela Alston	Dem Hold
21st	Richard Kimball	Dem	Carl J. Kunasek	Rep Gain
22nd	Manuel "Lito" Peña Jr.	Dem	Manuel "Lito" Peña Jr.	Dem Hold
23rd	Alfredo Gutierrez	Dem	Alfredo Gutierrez	Dem Hold
24th	John C. Pritzlaff Jr.	Rep	Pete Corpstein	Rep Hold
25th	Jacque Steiner	Rep	Jacque Steiner	Rep Hold
26th	Peter Kay	Rep	Peter Kay	Rep Hold
27th	James A. "Jim" Mack	Rep	Juanita Harelson	Rep Hold
28th	Robert B. Usdane	Rep	Robert B. Usdane	Rep Hold
29th	Jack J. Taylor	Rep	Jack J. Taylor	Rep Hold
30th	Stan Turley	Rep	Stan Turley	Rep Hold

== Detailed Results ==
=== District 1 ===
Republican primary results
Party	Candidate	Votes	%
Republican	John U. Hays	9,778	100.00%
Total votes		9,778	100.00%

General election results
Party	Candidate	Votes	%
Republican	John U. Hays	23,660	100.00%
Total votes		23,660	100.00%
Republican hold			

=== District 2 ===
Democratic primary results
Party	Candidate	Votes	%
Democratic	Tony Gabaldon (incumbent)	5,784	100.00%
Total votes		5,784	100.00%

Republican primary results
Party	Candidate	Votes	%
Republican	John G. Orr	5,695	100.00%
Total votes		5,695	100.00%

General election results
Party	Candidate	Votes	%
Democratic	Tony Gabaldon (incumbent)	14,334	50.61%
Republican	John G. Orr	13,990	49.39%
Total votes		28,324	100.00%
Democratic hold			

=== District 3 ===
Democratic primary results
Party	Candidate	Votes	%
Democratic	Arthur J. Hubbard, Sr. (incumbent)	3,243	68.35%
Democratic	Oscar Lee House, Sr.	1,502	31.65%
Total votes		4,745	100.00%

Republican primary results
Party	Candidate	Votes	%
Republican	MacArthur Lanakila Stant	1,250	99.84%
Republican	Roy O. Hawthorne (Note: Ran as a write-in candidate in the primary election.)	2	0.16%
Total votes		1,252	100.00%

General election results
Party	Candidate	Votes	%
Democratic	Arthur J. Hubbard, Sr. (incumbent)	13,833	84.12%
Republican	MacArthur Lanakila Stant	2,612	15.88%
Total votes		16,445	100.00%
Democratic hold			

=== District 4 ===
Democratic primary results
Party	Candidate	Votes	%
Democratic	A. V. "Bill" Hardt (incumbent)	9,878	100.00%
Total votes		9,878	100.00%

General election results
Party	Candidate	Votes	%
Democratic	A. V. "Bill" Hardt (incumbent)	15,132	100.00%
Total votes		15,132	100.00%
Democratic hold			

=== District 5 ===
Democratic primary results
Party	Candidate	Votes	%
Democratic	Jones Osborn (incumbent)	3,816	76.38%
Democratic	Carolyn S. Hill, Sr.	1,180	23.62%
Total votes		4,996	100.00%

Republican primary results
Party	Candidate	Votes	%
Republican	Al Face	2,195	100.00%
Total votes		2,195	100.00%

General election results
Party	Candidate	Votes	%
Democratic	Jones Osborn (incumbent)	11,117	59.85%
Republican	Al Face	7,459	40.15%
Total votes		18,576	100.00%
Democratic hold			

=== District 6 ===
Democratic primary results
Party	Candidate	Votes	%
Democratic	Polly Getzwiller (incumbent)	3,399	46.34%
Democratic	Alan Stephens	3,288	44.83%
Democratic	Moses Campbell Jr.	648	8.83%
Total votes		7,335	100.00%

Republican primary results
Party	Candidate	Votes	%
Republican	James W. Alverson	2,837	100.00%
Total votes		2,837	100.00%

General election results
Party	Candidate	Votes	%
Democratic	Polly Getzwiller (incumbent)	10,527	59.33%
Republican	James W. Alverson	7,215	40.67%
Total votes		17,742	100.00%
Democratic hold			

=== District 7 ===
Democratic primary results
Party	Candidate	Votes	%
Democratic	Peter D. Rios	5,576	54.69%
Democratic	Bill Swink (incumbent)	4,619	45.31%
Total votes		10,195	100.00%

Republican primary results
Party	Candidate	Votes	%
Republican	Barbara Peck	2,311	100.00%
Total votes		2,311	100.00%

General election results
Party	Candidate	Votes	%
Democratic	Peter D. Rios	12,487	59.89%
Republican	Barbara Peck	8,363	40.11%
Total votes		20,850	100.00%
Democratic hold			

=== District 8 ===
Democratic primary results
Party	Candidate	Votes	%
Democratic	Ed Sawyer (incumbent)	10,059	100.00%
Total votes		10,059	100.00%

General election results
Party	Candidate	Votes	%
Democratic	Ed C. Sawyer (incumbent)	15,960	100.00%
Total votes		15,960	100.00%
Democratic hold			

=== District 9 ===
Democratic primary results
Party	Candidate	Votes	%
Democratic	James L. Baker	3,512	57.57%
Democratic	Hester Johnson	2,588	42.43%
Total votes		6,100	100.00%

Republican primary results
Party	Candidate	Votes	%
Republican	Jeffrey J. Hill (incumbent)	6,365	100.00%
Total votes		6,365	100.00%

General election results
Party	Candidate	Votes	%
Republican	Jeffrey J. Hill (incumbent)	13,508	51.41%
Democratic	James L. Baker	12,766	48.59%
Total votes		26,274	100.00%
Republican hold			

=== District 10 ===
Democratic primary results
Party	Candidate	Votes	%
Democratic	Luis Armando Gonzales (incumbent)	2,961	55.09%
Democratic	Dave Rodriguez	2,414	44.91%
Total votes		5,375	100.00%

Libertarian Primary Results
Party	Candidate	Votes	%
Libertarian	Buck Crouch	14	100.00%
Total votes		14	100.00%

General election results
Party	Candidate	Votes	%
Democratic	Luis Armando Gonzales (incumbent)	10,643	74.67%
Libertarian	Buck Crouch	3,611	25.33%
Total votes		14,254	100.00%
Democratic hold			

=== District 11 ===
Democratic primary results
Party	Candidate	Votes	%
Democratic	Jaime P. Gutierrez (incumbent)	5,820	100.00%
Total votes		5,820	100.00%

Republican primary results
Party	Candidate	Votes	%
Republican	George F. Beasley	2,376	100.00%
Total votes		2,376	100.00%

General election results
Party	Candidate	Votes	%
Democratic	Jaime P. Gutierrez (incumbent)	15,306	68.89%
Republican	George F. Beasley	6,913	31.11%
Total votes		22,219	100.00%
Democratic hold			

=== District 12 ===
Democratic primary results
Party	Candidate	Votes	%
Democratic	David E. Bradshaw	5,429	100.00%
Total votes		5,429	100.00%

Republican primary results
Party	Candidate	Votes	%
Republican	John T. Mawhinney (incumbent)	6,164	100.00%
Total votes		6,164	100.00%

General election results
Party	Candidate	Votes	%
Republican	John T. Mawhinney (incumbent)	16,089	53.38%
Democratic	David E. Bradshaw	14,045	46.60%
Independent	David Foster (Note: Did not indicate party preference.) (Note: Ran as a write-in candidate in the general election.)	6	0.02%
Total votes		30,140	100.00%
Republican hold			

=== District 13 ===
Democratic primary results
Party	Candidate	Votes	%
Democratic	Douglas P. Mitchell	6,214	100.00%
Total votes		6,214	100.00%

Republican primary results
Party	Candidate	Votes	%
Republican	Greg Lunn (incumbent)	6,860	100.00%
Total votes		6,860	100.00%

General election results
Party	Candidate	Votes	%
Republican	Greg Lunn (incumbent)	17,869	55.95%
Democratic	Douglas P. Mitchell	14,071	44.05%
Total votes		31,940	100.00%
Republican hold			

=== District 14 ===
Democratic primary results
Party	Candidate	Votes	%
Democratic	Georgia Cole Brousseau	3,322	55.31%
Democratic	Ray Clark	2,684	44.69%
Total votes		6,006	100.00%

Republican primary results
Party	Candidate	Votes	%
Republican	William J. "Bill" DeLong	6,376	100.00%
Total votes		6,376	100.00%

General election results
Party	Candidate	Votes	%
Republican	William J. "Bill" DeLong	14,504	52.19%
Democratic	Georgia Cole Brousseau	13,286	47.81%
Total votes		27,790	100.00%
Republican hold			

=== District 15 ===
Democratic primary results
Party	Candidate	Votes	%
Democratic	Alan "A.L." L. Bowlsby	3,510	100.00%
Total votes		3,510	100.00%

Republican primary results
Party	Candidate	Votes	%
Republican	S. H. "Hal" Runyan (incumbent)	7,403	100.00%
Total votes		7,403	100.00%

General election results
Party	Candidate	Votes	%
Republican	S. H. "Hal" Runyan (incumbent)	16,143	67.14%
Democratic	Alan "A.L." L. Bowlsby	7,900	32.86%
Total votes		24,043	100.00%
Republican hold			

=== District 16 ===
Democratic primary results
Party	Candidate	Votes	%
Democratic	Marcia G. Weeks (incumbent)	3,102	100.00%
Total votes		3,102	100.00%

Republican primary results
Party	Candidate	Votes	%
Republican	Wayne Stump	3,934	76.64%
Republican	Tom Bauer	1,199	23.36%
Total votes		5,133	100.00%

General election results
Party	Candidate	Votes	%
Republican	Wayne Stump	11,974	50.32%
Democratic	Marcia G. Weeks (incumbent)	11,822	49.68%
Total votes		23,796	100.00%
Republican gain from Democratic			

=== District 17 ===
Republican primary results
Party	Candidate	Votes	%
Republican	Anne Lindeman (incumbent)	8,296	100.00%
Total votes		8,296	100.00%

General election results
Party	Candidate	Votes	%
Republican	Anne Lindeman (incumbent)	22,248	100.00%
Total votes		22,248	100.00%
Republican hold			

=== District 18 ===
Democratic primary results
Party	Candidate	Votes	%
Democratic	Barry Becker	2,412	66.45%
Democratic	Hannah "Happy" Shaw	1,218	33.55%
Total votes		3,630	100.00%

Republican primary results
Party	Candidate	Votes	%
Republican	Tony West	6,478	100.00%
Total votes		6,478	100.00%

General election results
Party	Candidate	Votes	%
Republican	Tony West	16,711	64.96%
Democratic	Barry Becker	9,013	35.04%
Total votes		25,724	100.00%
Republican hold			

=== District 19 ===
Democratic primary results
Party	Candidate	Votes	%
Democratic	J. L. "Jerry" Horacek, Sr.	2,770	100.00%
Total votes		2,770	100.00%

Republican primary results
Party	Candidate	Votes	%
Republican	Bill Davis	2,478	35.73%
Republican	John C. Keegan	2,380	34.31%
Republican	George J. Hartman	2,078	29.96%
Total votes		6,936	100.00%

General election results
Party	Candidate	Votes	%
Republican	Bill Davis	16,182	65.21%
Democratic	J. L. "Jerry" Horacek, Sr.	8,634	34.79%
Total votes		24,816	100.00%
Republican hold			

=== District 20 ===
Democratic primary results
Party	Candidate	Votes	%
Democratic	Lela Alston (incumbent)	3,966	100.00%
Total votes		3,966	100.00%

Republican primary results
Party	Candidate	Votes	%
Republican	Steve Hargan	3,848	99.90%
Republican	Martin B. Martin	4	0.10%
Total votes		3,852	100.00%

General election results
Party	Candidate	Votes	%
Democratic	Lela Alston (incumbent)	12,819	59.89%
Republican	Steve Hargan	8,584	40.11%
Total votes		21,403	100.00%
Democratic hold			

=== District 21 ===
- Democratic Senator Richard Kimball did not seek reelection and no other Democrat ran in the district; therefore, it was an automatic pick-up for the Republicans.

Republican primary results
Party	Candidate	Votes	%
Republican	Carl J. Kunasek	7,257	100.00%
Total votes		7,257	100.00%

Libertarian Primary Results
Party	Candidate	Votes	%
Libertarian	Steve Machol (Note: Withdrew from the general election.)	15	100.00%
Total votes		15	100.00%

General election results
Party	Candidate	Votes	%
Republican	Carl J. Kunasek	17,688	100.00%
Total votes		17,688	100.00%
Republican gain from Democratic			

=== District 22 ===
Democratic primary results
Party	Candidate	Votes	%
Democratic	Manuel "Lito" Peña Jr. (incumbent)	3,185	100.00%
Total votes		3,185	100.00%

Republican primary results
Party	Candidate	Votes	%
Republican	Caroline Coronado	1,080	100.00%
Total votes		1,080	100.00%

General election results
Party	Candidate	Votes	%
Democratic	Manuel "Lito" Peña Jr. (incumbent)	6,641	58.83%
Republican	Caroline Coronado	4,647	41.17%
Total votes		11,288	100.00%
Democratic hold			

=== District 23 ===
Democratic primary results
Party	Candidate	Votes	%
Democratic	Alfredo Gutierrez (incumbent)	3,874	60.11%
Democratic	Cloves C. Campbell	2,571	39.89%
Total votes		6,445	100.00%

Republican primary results
Party	Candidate	Votes	%
Republican	Bennie Joe "Bossa Nova" Brown	996	100.00%
Total votes		996	100.00%

Libertarian Primary Results
Party	Candidate	Votes	%
Libertarian	B. W. Chad Raible	22	100.00%
Total votes		22	100.00%

General election results
Party	Candidate	Votes	%
Democratic	Alfredo Gutierrez (incumbent)	9,144	78.13%
Republican	Bennie Joe "Bossa Nova" Brown	1,919	16.40%
Libertarian	B. W. Chad Raible	641	5.48%
Total votes		11,704	100.00%
Democratic hold			

=== District 24 ===
Democratic primary results
Party	Candidate	Votes	%
Democratic	Tom Beauchamp	2,420	100.00%
Total votes		2,420	100.00%

Republican primary results
Party	Candidate	Votes	%
Republican	Pete Corpstein	5,635	100.00%
Total votes		5,635	100.00%

General election results
Party	Candidate	Votes	%
Republican	Pete Corpstein	13,968	57.14%
Democratic	Tom Beauchamp	10,478	42.86%
Total votes		24,446	100.00%
Republican hold			

=== District 25 ===
Democratic primary results
Party	Candidate	Votes	%
Democratic	Dave Silcox	2,717	60.66%
Democratic	Marvin E. Perry	1,762	39.34%
Total votes		4,479	100.00%

Republican primary results
Party	Candidate	Votes	%
Republican	Jacque Steiner (incumbent)	6,087	100.00%
Total votes		6,087	100.00%

General election results
Party	Candidate	Votes	%
Republican	Jacque Steiner (incumbent)	14,821	59.26%
Democratic	Dave Silcox	10,188	40.74%
Total votes		25,009	100.00%
Republican hold			

=== District 26 ===
Democratic primary results
Party	Candidate	Votes	%
Democratic	Conrad "Jimmy" Carreon	3,558	100.00%
Total votes		3,558	100.00%

Republican primary results
Party	Candidate	Votes	%
Republican	Peter Kay (incumbent)	7,974	100.00%
Total votes		7,974	100.00%

General election results
Party	Candidate	Votes	%
Republican	Peter Kay (incumbent)	17,989	66.44%
Democratic	Conrad "Jimmy" Carreon	9,086	33.56%
Total votes		27,075	100.00%
Republican hold			

=== District 27 ===
Democratic primary results
Party	Candidate	Votes	%
Democratic	David Cohen	3,025	100.00%
Total votes		3,025	100.00%

Republican primary results
Party	Candidate	Votes	%
Republican	Juanita Harelson	7,047	100.00%
Total votes		7,047	100.00%

Libertarian Primary Results
Party	Candidate	Votes	%
Libertarian	Jennifer Douglas	1	100.00%
Total votes		1	100.00%

General election results
Party	Candidate	Votes	%
Republican	Juanita Harelson	14,696	61.48%
Democratic	David Cohen	7,653	32.01%
Libertarian	Jennifer Douglas	1,556	6.51%
Total votes		23,905	100.00%
Republican hold			

=== District 28 ===
Democratic primary results
Party	Candidate	Votes	%
Democratic	Monroe "Mickey" Dingott	2,213	100.00%
Total votes		2,213	100.00%

Republican primary results
Party	Candidate	Votes	%
Republican	Robert B. Usdane (incumbent)	7,380	100.00%
Total votes		7,380	100.00%

General election results
Party	Candidate	Votes	%
Republican	Robert B. Usdane (incumbent)	21,510	75.49%
Democratic	Monroe "Mickey" Dingott	6,985	24.51%
Total votes		28,495	100.00%
Republican hold			

=== District 29 ===
Democratic primary results
Party	Candidate	Votes	%
Democratic	Joseph Frank Assise	2,183	100.00%
Total votes		2,183	100.00%

Republican primary results
Party	Candidate	Votes	%
Republican	Jack J. Taylor (incumbent)	8,809	100.00%
Total votes		8,809	100.00%

General election results
Party	Candidate	Votes	%
Republican	Jack J. Taylor (incumbent)	16,939	100.00%
Total votes		16,939	100.00%
Republican hold			

=== District 30 ===
Republican primary results
Party	Candidate	Votes	%
Republican	Stan Turley (incumbent)	7,423	100.00%
Total votes		7,423	100.00%

General election results
Party	Candidate	Votes	%
Republican	Stan Turley (incumbent)	17,924	100.00%
Total votes		17,924	100.00%
Republican hold			
