= 1980 Arizona Senate election =

- November 4, 1980

All 30 seats of the Arizona Senate 16 seats needed for a majority
	Majority party	Minority party
Party	Republican	Democratic
Seats before	16	14
Seats after	16	14
Seat change	Steady	Steady
Senate President before election
Leo Corbet
Republican
Elected Senate President
Leo Corbet
Republican

The 1980 Arizona Senate election was held on November 4, 1980. Voters elected members of the Arizona Senate in all 30 of the state's legislative districts to serve a two-year term. Primary elections were held on September 9, 1980.

Prior to the elections, the Republicans held a majority of 16 seats over the Democrats' 14 seats.

Following the election, Republicans maintained control of the chamber and their majority of 16 Republicans to 14 Democrats remained unchanged.

The newly elected senators served in the 35th Arizona State Legislature.

== Retiring incumbents ==
=== Republicans ===
1. District 25: Trudy Camping
2. District 26: Rod J. McMullin

== Incumbents defeated in general elections ==
=== Democrat ===
1. District 13: Morris Farr

=== Republican ===
1. District 16: Wayne Stump

== Summary of results by Arizona State Legislative district ==
District	Incumbent	Party	Elected senator	Outcome
1st	Boyd Tenney	Rep	Boyd Tenney	Rep hold
2nd	Tony Gabaldon	Dem	Tony Gabaldon	Dem hold
3rd	Arthur J. Hubbard Sr.	Dem	Arthur J. Hubbard Sr.	Dem hold
4th	A.V. "Bill" Hardt	Dem	A.V. "Bill" Hardt	Dem hold
5th	Jones Osborn	Dem	Jones Osborn	Dem hold
6th	Polly Getzwiller	Dem	Polly Getzwiller	Dem hold
7th	William L. Swink	Dem	William L. Swink	Dem hold
8th	Ed Sawyer	Dem	Ed Sawyer	Dem hold
9th	Jeffrey J. Hill	Rep	Jeffrey J. Hill	Rep hold
10th	Luis A. Gonzales	Dem	Luis A. Gonzales	Dem hold
11th	Jaime P. Gutierrez	Dem	Jaime P. Gutierrez	Dem hold
12th	John T. Mawhinney	Rep	John T. Mawhinney	Rep hold
13th	Morris Farr	Dem	Greg Lunn	Rep gain
14th	Jim Kolbe	Rep	Jim Kolbe	Rep hold
15th	S.H. "Hal" Runyan	Rep	S.H. "Hal" Runyan	Rep hold
16th	Wayne Stump	Rep	Marcia G. Weeks	Dem gain
17th	Anne Lindeman	Rep	Anne Lindeman	Rep hold
18th	Leo Corbet	Rep	Leo Corbet	Rep hold
19th	Ray Rottas	Rep	Ray Rottas	Rep hold
20th	Lela Alston	Dem	Lela Alston	Dem hold
21st	Richard Kimball	Dem	Richard Kimball	Dem hold
22nd	Manuel "Lito" Peña	Dem	Manuel "Lito" Peña	Dem hold
23rd	Alfredo Gutierrez	Dem	Alfredo Gutierrez	Dem hold
24th	John C. Pritzlaff Jr.	Rep	John C. Pritzlaff Jr.	Rep hold
25th	Trudy Camping	Rep	Jacque Steiner	Rep hold
26th	Rod J. McMullin	Rep	Peter Kay	Rep hold
27th	James A. (Jim) Mack	Rep	James A. (Jim) Mack	Rep hold
28th	Robert B. Usdane	Rep	Robert B. Usdane	Rep hold
29th	Jack J. Taylor	Rep	Jack J. Taylor	Rep hold
30th	Stan Turley	Rep	Stan Turley	Rep hold

== Detailed results ==
=== District 1 ===
Republican primary results
Party	Candidate	Votes	%
Republican	Boyd Tenney (incumbent)	11,138	100.00%
Total votes		11,138	100.00%

General election results
Party	Candidate	Votes	%
Republican	Boyd Tenney (incumbent)	30,057	100.00%
Total votes		30,057	100.00%
Republican hold			

=== District 2 ===
Democratic primary results
Party	Candidate	Votes	%
Democratic	Tony Gabaldon (incumbent)	6,863	100.00%
Total votes		6,863	100.00%

Libertarian primary results
Party	Candidate	Votes	%
Libertarian	Jerry Newton (Note: Ran as a write-in candidate in the primary.)	9	100.00%
Total votes		9	100.00%

General election results
Party	Candidate	Votes	%
Democratic	Tony Gabaldon (incumbent)	18,820	78.66%
Libertarian	Jerry Newton	5,106	21.34%
Total votes		23,926	100.00%
Democratic hold			

=== District 3 ===
Democratic primary results
Party	Candidate	Votes	%
Democratic	Arthur J. Hubbard, Sr. (incumbent)	6,231	100.00%
Total votes		6,231	100.00%

General election results
Party	Candidate	Votes	%
Democratic	Arthur J. Hubbard, Sr. (incumbent)	14,057	100.00%
Total votes		14,057	100.00%
Democratic hold			

=== District 4 ===
Democratic primary results
Party	Candidate	Votes	%
Democratic	A. V. "Bill" Hardt (incumbent)	11,976	100.00%
Total votes		11,976	100.00%

Republican primary results
Party	Candidate	Votes	%
Republican	Jim Crosby	4,224	100.00%
Total votes		4,224	100.00%

Libertarian primary results
Party	Candidate	Votes	%
Libertarian	Joshua Wilson	1	100.00%
Total votes		1	100.00%

General election results
Party	Candidate	Votes	%
Democratic	A. V. "Bill" Hardt (incumbent)	15,842	54.52%
Republican	Jim Crosby	12,582	43.30%
Libertarian	Joshua Wilson	635	2.19%
Total votes		29,059	100.00%
Democratic hold			

=== District 5 ===
Democratic primary results
Party	Candidate	Votes	%
Democratic	Jones Osborn (incumbent)	5,504	71.36%
Democratic	Carol S. Hill	2,209	28.64%
Total votes		7,713	100.00%

General election results
Party	Candidate	Votes	%
Democratic	Jones Osborn (incumbent)	13,858	100.00%
Total votes		13,858	100.00%
Democratic hold			

=== District 6 ===
Democratic primary results
Party	Candidate	Votes	%
Democratic	Polly Getzwiller (incumbent)	4,744	100.00%
Total votes		4,744	100.00%

Republican primary results
Party	Candidate	Votes	%
Republican	James W. Alverson	1,878	100.00%
Total votes		1,878	100.00%

Libertarian primary results
Party	Candidate	Votes	%
Libertarian	Ronald Patrick McKinney	5	100.00%
Total votes		5	100.00%

General election results
Party	Candidate	Votes	%
Democratic	Polly Getzwiller (incumbent)	9,992	57.20%
Republican	James W. Alverson	6,589	37.72%
Libertarian	Ronald Patrick McKinney	887	5.08%
Democratic	Moses Campbell Jr. (Note: Ran as a write-in candidate in the general election.)	1	0.01%
Total votes		17,469	100.00%
Democratic hold			

=== District 7 ===
Democratic primary results
Party	Candidate	Votes	%
Democratic	William L. Swink (incumbent)	5,561	55.94%
Democratic	Len Fuller	4,380	44.06%
Total votes		9,941	100.00%

General election results
Party	Candidate	Votes	%
Democratic	William L. Swink (incumbent)	6,178	100.00%
Total votes		6,178	100.00%
Democratic hold			

=== District 8 ===
Democratic primary results
Party	Candidate	Votes	%
Democratic	Ed C. Sawyer (incumbent)	9,046	68.84%
Democratic	Albert F. Rodriguez	4,095	31.16%
Total votes		13,141	100.00%

General election results
Party	Candidate	Votes	%
Democratic	Ed C. Sawyer (incumbent)	17,649	100.00%
Total votes		17,649	100.00%
Democratic hold			

=== District 9 ===
Democratic primary results
Party	Candidate	Votes	%
Democratic	John R. Humphreys, Sr.	4,313	62.31%
Democratic	Carlos G. Gonzales	2,609	37.69%
Total votes		6,922	100.00%

Republican primary results
Party	Candidate	Votes	%
Republican	Jeffrey J. Hill (incumbent)	5,410	100.00%
Total votes		5,410	100.00%

General election results
Party	Candidate	Votes	%
Republican	Jeffrey J. Hill (incumbent)	17,275	60.83%
Democratic	John R. Humphreys, Sr.	11,126	39.17%
Total votes		28,401	100.00%
Republican hold			

=== District 10 ===
Democratic primary results
Party	Candidate	Votes	%
Democratic	Luis Armando Gonzales (incumbent)	3,257	64.04%
Democratic	Mike Martin	1,829	35.96%
Total votes		5,086	100.00%

Republican primary results
Party	Candidate	Votes	%
Republican	Irene L. Bice	838	100.00%
Total votes		838	100.00%

Libertarian primary results
Party	Candidate	Votes	%
Libertarian	Buck Crouch	18	100.00%
Total votes		18	100.00%

General election results
Party	Candidate	Votes	%
Democratic	Luis Armando Gonzales (incumbent)	7,999	59.14%
Republican	Irene L. Bice	2,945	21.77%
Libertarian	Buck Crouch	2,581	19.08%
Total votes		13,525	100.00%
Democratic hold			

=== District 11 ===
Democratic primary results
Party	Candidate	Votes	%
Democratic	Jaime P. Gutierrez (incumbent)	5,158	100.00%
Total votes		5,158	100.00%

Republican primary results
Party	Candidate	Votes	%
Republican	Marcia Niemann	1,767	100.00%
Total votes		1,767	100.00%

General election results
Party	Candidate	Votes	%
Democratic	Jaime P. Gutierrez (incumbent)	11,491	58.08%
Republican	Marcia Niemann	8,294	41.92%
Total votes		19,785	100.00%
Democratic hold			

=== District 12 ===
Democratic primary results
Party	Candidate	Votes	%
Democratic	Kay Federoff	6,165	100.00%
Total votes		6,165	100.00%

Republican primary results
Party	Candidate	Votes	%
Republican	John T. Mawhinney (incumbent)	5,522	100.00%
Total votes		5,522	100.00%

General election results
Party	Candidate	Votes	%
Republican	John T. Mawhinney (incumbent)	19,924	52.10%
Democratic	Kay Federoff	18,317	47.90%
Total votes		38,241	100.00%
Republican hold			

=== District 13 ===
Democratic primary results
Party	Candidate	Votes	%
Democratic	Morris Farr (incumbent)	5,510	100.00%
Total votes		5,510	100.00%

Republican primary results
Party	Candidate	Votes	%
Republican	Greg Lunn	4,574	100.00%
Total votes		4,574	100.00%

General election results
Party	Candidate	Votes	%
Republican	Greg Lunn	16,412	52.45%
Democratic	Morris Farr (incumbent)	14,881	47.55%
Total votes		31,293	100.00%
Republican gain from Democratic			

=== District 14 ===
Democratic primary results
Party	Candidate	Votes	%
Democratic	Peter Stoss	6,059	100.00%
Total votes		6,059	100.00%

Republican primary results
Party	Candidate	Votes	%
Republican	Jim Kolbe (incumbent)	7,238	100.00%
Total votes		7,238	100.00%

General election results
Party	Candidate	Votes	%
Republican	Jim Kolbe (incumbent)	28,041	72.64%
Democratic	Peter Stoss	10,564	27.36%
Total votes		38,605	100.00%
Republican hold			

=== District 15 ===
Democratic primary results
Party	Candidate	Votes	%
Democratic	Dennis M. Teel	194	74.90%
Democratic	Jim McCoy	65	25.10%
Total votes		259	100.00%

Republican primary results
Party	Candidate	Votes	%
Republican	S. H. "Hal" Runyan (incumbent)	5,145	100.00%
Total votes		5,145	100.00%

General election results
Party	Candidate	Votes	%
Republican	S. H. "Hal" Runyan (incumbent)	16,068	65.63%
Democratic	Dennis M. Teel	8,416	34.37%
Total votes		24,484	100.00%
Republican hold			

=== District 16 ===
Democratic primary results
Party	Candidate	Votes	%
Democratic	Marcia G. Weeks	5,093	100.00%
Total votes		5,093	100.00%

Republican primary results
Party	Candidate	Votes	%
Republican	Wayne Stump (incumbent)	6,476	100.00%
Total votes		6,476	100.00%

Libertarian primary results
Party	Candidate	Votes	%
Libertarian	Frank Schoenfeld	26	100.00%
Total votes		26	100.00%

General election results
Party	Candidate	Votes	%
Democratic	Marcia G. Weeks	20,830	49.49%
Republican	Wayne Stump (incumbent)	19,849	47.16%
Libertarian	Frank Schoenfeld	1,411	3.35%
Total votes		42,090	100.00%
Democratic gain from Republican			

=== District 17 ===
Democratic primary results
Party	Candidate	Votes	%
Democratic	Justin "Jed" Smith	3,757	100.00%
Total votes		3,757	100.00%

Republican primary results
Party	Candidate	Votes	%
Republican	Anne Lindeman (incumbent)	8,022	100.00%
Total votes		8,022	100.00%

General election results
Party	Candidate	Votes	%
Republican	Anne Lindeman (incumbent)	25,178	72.93%
Democratic	Justin "Jed" Smith	9,347	27.07%
Total votes		34,525	100.00%
Republican hold			

=== District 18 ===
Democratic primary results
Party	Candidate	Votes	%
Democratic	Sheldon Zwerling	33	62.26%
Democratic	Hannah Shaw	20	37.74%
Total votes		53	100.00%

Republican primary results
Party	Candidate	Votes	%
Republican	Leo Corbet (incumbent)	4,490	100.00%
Total votes		4,490	100.00%

Libertarian primary results
Party	Candidate	Votes	%
Libertarian	Kathryn L. O'Connell	29	100.00%
Total votes		29	100.00%

General election results
Party	Candidate	Votes	%
Republican	Leo Corbet (incumbent)	15,211	66.40%
Democratic	Sheldon Zwerling	4,913	21.45%
Libertarian	Kathryn L. O'Connell	2,785	12.16%
Total votes		22,909	100.00%
Republican hold			

=== District 19 ===
Democratic primary results
Party	Candidate	Votes	%
Democratic	Lois E. Pfau	2,648	100.00%
Total votes		2,648	100.00%

Republican primary results
Party	Candidate	Votes	%
Republican	Ray Rottas (incumbent)	4,194	100.00%
Total votes		4,194	100.00%

General election results
Party	Candidate	Votes	%
Republican	Ray Rottas (incumbent)	15,026	68.00%
Democratic	Lois E. Pfau	7,071	32.00%
Total votes		22,097	100.00%
Republican hold			

=== District 20 ===
Democratic primary results
Party	Candidate	Votes	%
Democratic	Lela Alston (incumbent)	3,171	100.00%
Total votes		3,171	100.00%

Republican primary results
Party	Candidate	Votes	%
Republican	Steve Hargan	2,699	100.00%
Total votes		2,699	100.00%

General election results
Party	Candidate	Votes	%
Democratic	Lela Alston (incumbent)	9,511	53.38%
Republican	Steve Hargan	8,305	46.62%
Total votes		17,816	100.00%
Democratic hold			

=== District 21 ===
Democratic primary results
Party	Candidate	Votes	%
Democratic	Richard Kimball (incumbent)	3,174	100.00%
Total votes		3,174	100.00%

Republican primary results
Party	Candidate	Votes	%
Republican	Joe Haldiman III	3,052	100.00%
Total votes		3,052	100.00%

General election results
Party	Candidate	Votes	%
Democratic	Richard Kimball (incumbent)	10,473	58.37%
Republican	Joe Haldiman III	7,466	41.61%
Libertarian	B. W. Chad Raible	4	0.02%
Total votes		17,943	100.00%
Democratic hold			

=== District 22 ===
Democratic primary results
Party	Candidate	Votes	%
Democratic	Manuel "Lito" Peña Jr. (incumbent)	2,475	100.00%
Total votes		2,475	100.00%

Republican primary results
Party	Candidate	Votes	%
Republican	Carl T. Smith	816	100.00%
Total votes		816	100.00%

Libertarian primary results
Party	Candidate	Votes	%
Libertarian	Roxanna D. Rega	8	100.00%
Total votes		8	100.00%

General election results
Party	Candidate	Votes	%
Democratic	Manuel "Lito" Peña Jr. (incumbent)	5,439	52.67%
Republican	Carl T. Smith	4,441	43.01%
Libertarian	Roxanna D. Rega	446	4.32%
Total votes		10,326	100.00%
Democratic hold			

=== District 23 ===
Democratic primary results
Party	Candidate	Votes	%
Democratic	Alfredo Gutierrez (incumbent)	2,034	100.00%
Total votes		2,034	100.00%

Republican primary results
Party	Candidate	Votes	%
Republican	Bennie Joe "Bossa Nova" Brown	250	100.00%
Total votes		250	100.00%

General election results
Party	Candidate	Votes	%
Democratic	Alfredo Gutierrez (incumbent)	5,142	82.38%
Republican	Bennie Joe "Bossa Nova" Brown	1,100	17.62%
Total votes		6,242	100.00%
Democratic hold			

=== District 24 ===
Democratic primary results
Party	Candidate	Votes	%
Democratic	Gene Bullock	286	100.00%
Total votes		286	100.00%

Republican primary results
Party	Candidate	Votes	%
Republican	John C. Pritzlaff Jr. (incumbent)	12,808	100.00%
Total votes		12,808	100.00%

Libertarian primary results
Party	Candidate	Votes	%
Libertarian	Harry E. Fuller	41	100.00%
Total votes		41	100.00%

General election results
Party	Candidate	Votes	%
Republican	John C. Pritzlaff Jr. (incumbent)	47,808	68.68%
Democratic	Gene Bullock	17,798	25.57%
Libertarian	Harry E. Fuller	4,004	5.75%
Total votes		69,610	100.00%
Republican hold			

=== District 25 ===
Democratic primary results
Party	Candidate	Votes	%
Democratic	Mike McCormick	3,066	100.00%
Total votes		3,066	100.00%

Republican primary results
Party	Candidate	Votes	%
Republican	Jacque Steiner	2,892	100.00%
Total votes		2,892	100.00%

Libertarian primary results
Party	Candidate	Votes	%
Libertarian	James Mlnarik	22	100.00%
Total votes		22	100.00%

General election results
Party	Candidate	Votes	%
Republican	Jacque Steiner	9,361	52.48%
Democratic	Mike McCormick	7,944	44.54%
Libertarian	James Mlnarik	532	2.98%
Total votes		17,837	100.00%
Republican hold			

=== District 26 ===
Democratic primary results
Party	Candidate	Votes	%
Democratic	Mary C. Hegarty	2,534	100.00%
Total votes		2,534	100.00%

Republican primary results
Party	Candidate	Votes	%
Republican	Peter Kay	5,317	100.00%
Total votes		5,317	100.00%

Libertarian primary results
Party	Candidate	Votes	%
Libertarian	"J" Wayne Murray	20	100.00%
Total votes		20	100.00%

General election results
Party	Candidate	Votes	%
Republican	Peter Kay	13,288	60.51%
Democratic	Mary C. Hegarty	7,526	34.27%
Libertarian	"J" Wayne Murray	1,145	5.21%
Total votes		21,959	100.00%
Republican hold			

=== District 27 ===
Democratic primary results
Party	Candidate	Votes	%
Democratic	David Cohen	3,605	100.00%
Total votes		3,605	100.00%

Republican primary results
Party	Candidate	Votes	%
Republican	James A. "Jim" Mack (incumbent)	5,308	100.00%
Total votes		5,308	100.00%

Libertarian primary results
Party	Candidate	Votes	%
Libertarian	Monica Swift	39	100.00%
Total votes		39	100.00%

General election results
Party	Candidate	Votes	%
Republican	James A. "Jim" Mack (incumbent)	21,960	61.04%
Democratic	David Cohen	10,974	30.50%
Libertarian	Monica Swift	3,043	8.46%
Total votes		35,977	100.00%
Republican hold			

=== District 28 ===
Democratic primary results
Party	Candidate	Votes	%
Democratic	Guy Panarello	419	100.00%
Total votes		419	100.00%

Republican primary results
Party	Candidate	Votes	%
Republican	Robert B. Usdane (incumbent)	5,659	100.00%
Total votes		5,659	100.00%

General election results
Party	Candidate	Votes	%
Republican	Robert B. Usdane (incumbent)	24,971	78.08%
Democratic	Guy Panarello	7,009	21.92%
Total votes		31,980	100.00%
Republican hold			

=== District 29 ===
Republican primary results
Party	Candidate	Votes	%
Republican	Jack J. Taylor (incumbent)	7,494	100.00%
Total votes		7,494	100.00%

Libertarian primary results
Party	Candidate	Votes	%
Libertarian	Glen Baumgartner	10	100.00%
Total votes		10	100.00%

General election results
Party	Candidate	Votes	%
Republican	Jack J. Taylor (incumbent)	19,703	85.71%
Libertarian	Glen Baumgartner	3,285	14.29%
Total votes		22,988	100.00%
Republican hold			

=== District 30 ===
Republican primary results
Party	Candidate	Votes	%
Republican	Stan Turley (incumbent)	8,667	100.00%
Total votes		8,667	100.00%

Libertarian primary results
Party	Candidate	Votes	%
Libertarian	Ross Leitch	33	64.71%
Libertarian	Clyde R. Dickinson Jr.	18	35.29%
Total votes		51	100.00%

General election results
Party	Candidate	Votes	%
Republican	Stan Turley (incumbent)	38,452	85.70%
Libertarian	Ross Leitch	6,417	14.30%
Total votes		44,869	100.00%
Republican hold			
