= 1980 Arizona House of Representatives election =

1980 Arizona House of Representatives elections
- November 4, 1980

All 60 seats in the Arizona House 31 seats needed for a majority
	Majority party	Minority party
Leader	Frank Kelley	Larry Bahill
Party	Republican	Democratic
Leader's seat	26th	10th
Last election	42	18
Seats after	43	17
Seat change	▲1	▼1
Speaker before election
Frank Kelley
Republican
Elected Speaker
Frank Kelley
Republican

The 1980 Arizona House of Representatives elections were held on November 4, 1980. Voters elected all 60 members of the Arizona House of Representatives in multi-member districts to serve a two-year term. The elections coincided with the elections for other offices, including U.S. Senate, U.S. House, and State Senate. Primary elections were held on September 9, 1980.

Prior to the elections, the Republicans held a majority of 42 seats over the Democrats' 18 seats.

Following the elections, Republicans maintained control of the chamber and expanded their majority to 43 Republicans to 17 Democrats, a net gain of one seat for Republicans.

The newly elected members served in the 35th Arizona State Legislature, during which Republican Frank Kelley was re-elected as Speaker of the Arizona House. (Note: Kelley was re-elected as Speaker for the 35th legislature by acclamation.)

== Summary of Results by Arizona State Legislative District ==
District	Incumbent	Party	Elected Representative	Outcome
1st	John Hays	Rep	John Hays	Rep Hold
1st	Jerry Everall	Rep	Jerry Everall	Rep Hold
2nd	Sam A. McConnell Jr.	Rep	Sam A. McConnell Jr.	Rep Hold
2nd	John Wettaw	Rep	John Wettaw	Rep Hold
3rd	Benjamin Hanley	Dem	Benjamin Hanley	Dem Hold
3rd	Daniel Peaches	Rep	Daniel Peaches	Rep Hold
4th	E. C. "Polly" Rosenbaum	Dem	E. C. "Polly" Rosenbaum	Dem Hold
4th	Edward G. "Bunch" Guerrero	Dem	Edward G. "Bunch" Guerrero	Dem Hold
5th	Frank McElhaney	Dem	Frank McElhaney	Dem Hold
5th	Morris "Court" Courtright	Rep	Morris "Court" Courtright	Rep Hold
6th	Jim Hartdegen	Rep	Jim Hartdegen	Rep Hold
6th	Renz D. Jennings	Dem	Renz D. Jennings	Dem Hold
7th	Richard "Dick" Pacheco	Dem	Richard "Dick" Pacheco	Dem Hold
7th	Marjory "Marge" Ollson	Dem	George W. Kline	Rep Gain
8th	Steve J. Vukcevich	Dem	Steve J. Vukcevich	Dem Hold
8th	Joe Lane	Rep	Joe Lane	Rep Hold
9th	Bill English	Rep	Bill English	Rep Hold
9th	Bart Baker	Rep	Bart Baker	Rep Hold
10th	Carmen Cajero	Dem	Carmen Cajero	Dem Hold
10th	Larry Bahill	Dem	Jesus "Chuy" Higuera	Dem Hold
11th	Peter Goudinoff	Dem	Peter Goudinoff	Dem Hold
11th	Mike Morales	Rep	Mike Morales	Rep Hold
12th	Thomas N. "Tom" Goodwin	Rep	Thomas N. "Tom" Goodwin	Rep Hold
12th	John Kromko	Dem	Elmer D. "E.D." Jewett Jr.	Rep Gain
13th	Clare Dunn	Dem	Clare Dunn (Note: Democrat Clare Dunn of District 13 died in office on July 30, 1981. David M. Rodriguez was appointed on August 7, 1981 by the Pima County Board of Supervisors to fill the vacancy.)	Dem Hold
13th	Larry Hawke	Rep	Larry Hawke	Rep Hold
14th	Arnold Jeffers	Rep	Elizabeth H. Lew Macy	Rep Hold
14th	Ralph Soelter	Rep	William J. "Bill" De Long	Rep Hold
15th	James B. Ratliff	Rep	James B. Ratliff	Rep Hold
15th	Bob Denny	Rep	Bob Denny	Rep Hold
16th	Bob Hungerford	Rep	Bob Hungerford	Rep Hold
16th	Diane B. McCarthy	Rep	Rhonda Thomas	Rep Hold
17th	C. W. "Bill" Lewis	Rep	C. W. "Bill" Lewis	Rep Hold
17th	Patricia "Pat" Wright	Rep	Patricia "Pat" Wright	Rep Hold
18th	Burton S. Barr	Rep	Burton S. Barr	Rep Hold
18th	Pete Dunn	Rep	Pete Dunn	Rep Hold
19th	Tony West	Rep	Tony West	Rep Hold
19th	Jane Dee Hull	Rep	Jane Dee Hull	Rep Hold
20th	Lillian K. Jordan	Rep	Lillian K. Jordan	Rep Hold
20th	Debbie McCune	Dem	Debbie McCune	Dem Hold
21st	Elizabeth Adams Rockwell	Rep	Elizabeth Adams Rockwell	Rep Hold
21st	Donald J. Kenney	Rep	Donald J. Kenney	Rep Hold
22nd	Art Hamilton	Dem	Art Hamilton	Dem Hold
22nd	Earl V. Wilcox	Dem	Earl V. Wilcox	Dem Hold
23rd	Leon Thompson	Dem	Leon Thompson	Dem Hold
23rd	Tony R. Abril	Dem	Tony R. Abril	Dem Hold
24th	Pete Corpstein	Rep	Pete Corpstein	Rep Hold
24th	Cal Holman	Rep	Cal Holman	Rep Hold
25th	D. Lee Jones	Rep	D. Lee Jones	Rep Hold
25th	Jacque Steiner	Rep	Glenn Davis	Dem Gain
26th	Frank Kelley	Rep	Frank Kelley	Rep Hold
26th	Peter Kay	Rep	James "Jim" Meredith	Rep Hold
27th	Juanita Harelson	Rep	Juanita Harelson	Rep Hold
27th	Doug Todd	Rep	Doug Todd	Rep Hold
28th	Jim Skelly	Rep	Jim Skelly	Rep Hold
28th	Paul R. Messinger (Note: Republican David B. Kret died in office on May 10, 1979. Paul R. Messinger was elected to fill the vacancy in the 28th District on September 11, 1979 in a special election. Mr. Messinger defeated Democratic Scottsdale Mayor Bill Jenkins in the September special election, which was only the second time a special election was conducted to fill a vacancy instead of an appointment from the appropriate board of county supervisors. Mr. Messinger was administered the Oath of Office on October 17, 1979 and was seated as a Member of the Arizona House of Representatives, Thirty-Fourth Legislature on November 12, 1979.)	Rep	Paul R. Messinger	Rep Hold
29th	Jim Cooper	Rep	Jim Cooper	Rep Hold
29th	Donna Carlson West	Rep	Donna Carlson West	Rep Hold
30th	James J. Sossaman	Rep	James J. Sossaman	Rep Hold
30th	Carl J. Kunasek	Rep	Carl J. Kunasek	Rep Hold

== Detailed Results ==
=== District 1 ===
Primary Election Results
Party	Candidate	Votes	%
Republican Party Primary Results
Republican	John Hays (incumbent)	8,570	39.20%
Republican	Jerry Everall (incumbent)	7,530	34.44%
Republican	Maurice W. "Maury" Coburn	5,765	26.37%
Total votes		21,865	100.00%

General Election Results
Party	Candidate	Votes	%
Republican	John Hays (incumbent)	31,333	54.48%
Republican	Jerry Everall (incumbent)	26,179	45.52%
Total votes		57,512	100.00%
Republican hold			
Republican hold			

=== District 2 ===
Primary Election Results
Party	Candidate	Votes	%
Democratic Party Primary Results
Democratic	John Scott	5,336	57.97%
Democratic	Lisa Perry	3,868	42.03%
Total votes		9,204	100.00%
Republican Party Primary Results
Republican	John Wettaw (incumbent)	3,946	51.96%
Republican	Sam A. McConnell Jr. (incumbent)	3,648	48.04%
Total votes		7,594	100.00%

General Election Results
Party	Candidate	Votes	%
Republican	John Wettaw (incumbent)	17,114	36.32%
Republican	Sam A. McConnell Jr. (incumbent)	14,270	30.29%
Democratic	John Scott	10,854	23.04%
Democratic	Lisa Perry	4,876	10.35%
Total votes		47,114	100.00%
Republican hold			
Republican hold			

=== District 3 ===
Primary Election Results
Party	Candidate	Votes	%
Democratic Party Primary Results
Democratic	Benjamin Hanley (incumbent)	5,264	63.37%
Democratic	Loren Tapahe	3,043	36.63%
Total votes		8,307	100.00%
Republican Party Primary Results
Republican	Daniel Peaches (incumbent)	1,807	57.99%
Republican	John A. Collings	1,309	42.01%
Total votes		3,116	100.00%

General Election Results
Party	Candidate	Votes	%
Democratic	Benjamin Hanley (incumbent)	10,237	31.07%
Republican	Daniel Peaches (incumbent)	9,716	29.49%
Democratic	Loren Tapahe	6,973	21.16%
Republican	John A. Collings	6,024	18.28%
Total votes		32,950	100.00%
Democratic hold			
Republican hold			

=== District 4 ===
Primary Election Results
Party	Candidate	Votes	%
Democratic Party Primary Results
Democratic	E. C. "Polly" Rosenbaum (incumbent)	9,740	50.64%
Democratic	Edward G. "Bunch" Guerrero (incumbent)	9,494	49.36%
Total votes		19,234	100.00%
Republican Party Primary Results
Republican	Jenny C. Uhlig	3,951	100.00%
Total votes		3,951	100.00%
Libertarian Party Primary Results
Libertarian	Teresa Wilson (Note: Was a write-in candidate in the primary election.)	1	100.00%
Total votes		1	100.00%

General Election Results
Party	Candidate	Votes	%
Democratic	E. C. "Polly" Rosenbaum (incumbent)	16,767	37.77%
Democratic	Edward G. "Bunch" Guerrero (incumbent)	13,552	30.53%
Republican	Jenny C. Uhlig	10,812	24.36%
Libertarian	Teresa Wilson	3,256	7.34%
Total votes		44,387	100.00%
Democratic hold			
Democratic hold			

=== District 5 ===
Primary Election Results
Party	Candidate	Votes	%
Democratic Party Primary Results
Democratic	Frank McElhaney (incumbent)	4,937	51.60%
Democratic	Michael Irwin	4,631	48.40%
Total votes		9,568	100.00%
Republican Party Primary Results
Republican	Morris "Court" Courtright (incumbent)	3,117	100.00%
Total votes		3,117	100.00%

General Election Results
Party	Candidate	Votes	%
Republican	Morris "Court" Courtright (incumbent)	10,607	35.69%
Democratic	Frank McElhaney (incumbent)	9,821	33.05%
Democratic	Michael Irwin	9,292	31.27%
Total votes		29,720	100.00%
Republican hold			
Democratic hold			

=== District 6 ===
Primary Election Results
Party	Candidate	Votes	%
Democratic Party Primary Results
Democratic	Renz D. Jennings (incumbent)	3,457	42.41%
Democratic	Henry Evans	2,655	32.57%
Democratic	Maria E. Alvarez	2,040	25.02%
Total votes		8,152	100.00%
Republican Party Primary Results
Republican	Jim Hartdegen (incumbent)	2,011	100.00%
Total votes		2,011	100.00%
Libertarian Party Primary Results
Libertarian	Dorothy L. Zarbin	4	100.00%
Total votes		4	100.00%

General Election Results
Party	Candidate	Votes	%
Democratic	Renz D. Jennings (incumbent)	9,556	33.96%
Republican	Jim Hartdegen (incumbent)	9,394	33.38%
Democratic	Henry Evans	7,792	27.69%
Libertarian	Dorothy L. Zarbin	1,399	4.97%
Total votes		28,141	100.00%
Democratic hold			
Republican hold			

=== District 7 ===
Primary Election Results
Party	Candidate	Votes	%
Democratic Party Primary Results
Democratic	Richard "Dick" Pacheco (incumbent)	6,100	39.60%
Democratic	Peter Rios	4,968	32.25%
Democratic	Marjory "Marge" Ollson (incumbent)	4,336	28.15%
Total votes		15,404	100.00%
Republican Party Primary Results
Republican	George W. Kline	2,479	100.00%
Total votes		2,479	100.00%

General Election Results
Party	Candidate	Votes	%
Democratic	Richard "Dick" Pacheco (incumbent)	10,980	36.49%
Republican	George W. Kline	9,747	32.39%
Democratic	Peter D. Rios	9,364	31.12%
Total votes		30,091	100.00%
Democratic hold			
Republican gain from Democratic			

=== District 8 ===
Primary Election Results
Party	Candidate	Votes	%
Democratic Party Primary Results
Democratic	Steve J. Vukcevich (incumbent)	11,116	100.00%
Total votes		11,116	100.00%
Republican Party Primary Results
Republican	Joe Lane (incumbent)	2,804	55.90%
Republican	H. Lee Smith	2,212	44.10%
Total votes		5,016	100.00%

General Election Results
Party	Candidate	Votes	%
Republican	Joe Lane (incumbent)	13,429	38.26%
Democratic	Steve J. Vukcevich (incumbent)	12,891	36.73%
Republican	H. Lee Smith	8,776	25.01%
Total votes		35,096	100.00%
Republican hold			
Democratic hold			

=== District 9 ===
Primary Election Results
Party	Candidate	Votes	%
Democratic Party Primary Results
Democratic	Mark O. Mills	4,690	53.38%
Democratic	Walter Holliday III	4,096	46.62%
Total votes		8,786	100.00%
Republican Party Primary Results
Republican	Bill English (incumbent)	4,128	37.39%
Republican	Bart Baker (incumbent)	3,796	34.38%
Republican	Rod Cramer	3,117	28.23%
Total votes		11,041	100.00%

General Election Results
Party	Candidate	Votes	%
Republican	Bill English (incumbent)	17,524	33.35%
Republican	Bart Baker (incumbent)	15,794	30.06%
Democratic	Mark O. Mills	10,478	19.94%
Democratic	Walter Holliday III	8,747	16.65%
Total votes		52,543	100.00%
Republican hold			
Republican hold			

=== District 10 ===
Primary Election Results
Party	Candidate	Votes	%
Democratic Party Primary Results
Democratic	Carmen Cajero (incumbent)	2,909	32.37%
Democratic	Jesus "Chuy" Higuera	2,094	23.30%
Democratic	Ron De Schalit	1,579	17.57%
Democratic	Cora Esquibel	1,298	14.44%
Democratic	Doug Shakel	1,106	12.31%
Total votes		8,986	100.00%
Libertarian Party Primary Results
Libertarian	Robert A. Stirn	16	100.00%
Total votes		16	100.00%

General Election Results
Party	Candidate	Votes	%
Democratic	Carmen Cajero (incumbent)	8,840	46.75%
Democratic	Jesus "Chuy" Higuera	6,958	36.79%
Libertarian	Robert A. Stirn	3,113	16.46%
Total votes		18,911	100.00%
Democratic hold			
Democratic hold			

=== District 11 ===
Primary Election Results
Party	Candidate	Votes	%
Democratic Party Primary Results
Democratic	Peter Goudinoff (incumbent)	3,755	40.59%
Democratic	Estevan A. Rodriguez	3,506	37.90%
Democratic	Ward J. Tombaugh	1,990	21.51%
Total votes		9,251	100.00%
Republican Party Primary Results
Republican	Mike Morales (incumbent)	1,851	100.00%
Total votes		1,851	100.00%

General Election Results
Party	Candidate	Votes	%
Democratic	Peter Goudinoff (incumbent)	11,404	36.98%
Republican	Mike Morales (incumbent)	10,567	34.27%
Democratic	Estevan A. Rodriguez	8,868	28.76%
Total votes		30,839	100.00%
Democratic hold			
Republican hold			

=== District 12 ===
Primary Election Results
Party	Candidate	Votes	%
Democratic Party Primary Results
Democratic	John Kromko (incumbent)	6,148	60.86%
Democratic	Larry Beiser	3,954	39.14%
Total votes		10,102	100.00%
Republican Party Primary Results
Republican	Thomas N. "Tom" Goodwin (incumbent)	4,959	52.55%
Republican	Ed Jewett	4,477	47.45%
Total votes		9,436	100.00%

General Election Results
Party	Candidate	Votes	%
Republican	Thomas N. "Tom" Goodwin (incumbent)	22,094	32.29%
Republican	Ed Jewett	19,248	28.13%
Democratic	John Kromko (incumbent)	17,813	26.03%
Democratic	Larry Beiser	9,273	13.55%
Total votes		68,428	100.00%
Republican hold			
Republican gain from Democratic			

=== District 13 ===
Primary Election Results
Party	Candidate	Votes	%
Democratic Party Primary Results
Democratic	Clare Dunn (incumbent)	5,174	61.18%
Democratic	Betty C. Bovinet	3,283	38.82%
Total votes		8,457	100.00%
Republican Party Primary Results
Republican	Larry Hawke (incumbent)	4,613	100.00%
Total votes		4,613	100.00%

General Election Results
Party	Candidate	Votes	%
Democratic	Clare Dunn (incumbent)	20,206	41.44%
Republican	Larry Hawke (incumbent)	18,410	37.76%
Democratic	Betty C. Bovinet	10,143	20.80%
Total votes		48,759	100.00%
Democratic hold			
Republican hold			

=== District 14 ===
Primary Election Results
Party	Candidate	Votes	%
Democratic Party Primary Results
Democratic	J. L. "Jim" Hill	5,016	50.13%
Democratic	Cindy L. Resnick	4,989	49.87%
Total votes		10,005	100.00%
Republican Party Primary Results
Republican	William J. "Bill" De Long	6,496	53.54%
Republican	Elizabeth H. Lew Macy	5,638	46.46%
Total votes		12,134	100.00%

General Election Results
Party	Candidate	Votes	%
Republican	William J. "Bill" De Long	22,650	30.82%
Republican	Elizabeth H. Lew Macy	20,846	28.36%
Democratic	Cindy L. Resnick	16,950	23.06%
Democratic	J. L. "Jim" Hill	13,049	17.75%
Total votes		73,495	100.00%
Republican hold			
Republican hold			

=== District 15 ===
Primary Election Results
Party	Candidate	Votes	%
Republican Party Primary Results
Republican	James B. Ratliff (incumbent)	4,828	50.73%
Republican	Bob Denny (incumbent)	4,689	49.27%
Total votes		9,517	100.00%

General Election Results
Party	Candidate	Votes	%
Republican	Bob Denny (incumbent)	16,937	50.37%
Republican	James B. Ratliff (incumbent)	16,691	49.63%
Total votes		33,628	100.00%
Republican hold			
Republican hold			

=== District 16 ===
Primary Election Results
Party	Candidate	Votes	%
Democratic Party Primary Results
Democratic	Jim Kieffer	3,831	44.37%
Democratic	Peggy Wright	3,032	35.12%
Democratic	Noreen Matheson	1,771	20.51%
Total votes		8,634	100.00%
Republican Party Primary Results
Republican	Bob Hungerford (incumbent)	4,352	34.98%
Republican	Rhonda Thomas	3,995	32.11%
Republican	Archie Doss	2,356	18.94%
Republican	Jim Mahar	1,739	13.98%
Total votes		12,442	100.00%
Libertarian Party Primary Results
Libertarian	Stephen Edward Clark	22	50.00%
Libertarian	Lorraina M. Valencia	22	50.00%
Total votes		44	100.00%

General Election Results
Party	Candidate	Votes	%
Republican	Bob Hungerford (incumbent)	22,263	29.18%
Republican	Rhonda Thomas	19,599	25.68%
Democratic	Jim Kieffer	17,123	22.44%
Democratic	Peggy Wright	13,892	18.21%
Libertarian	Stephen Edward Clark	1,933	2.53%
Libertarian	Lorraina M. Valencia	1,496	1.96%
Total votes		76,306	100.00%
Republican hold			
Republican hold			

=== District 17 ===
Primary Election Results
Party	Candidate	Votes	%
Democratic Party Primary Results
Democratic	Ron Larrabee	3,098	51.06%
Democratic	Joe D. Alvarado	2,969	48.94%
Total votes		6,067	100.00%
Republican Party Primary Results
Republican	Patricia "Pat" Wright (incumbent)	6,797	43.42%
Republican	C. W. "Bill" Lewis (incumbent)	4,810	30.73%
Republican	Gerry Daly	2,732	17.45%
Republican	Lenny C. Letcher	1,315	8.40%
Total votes		15,654	100.00%

General Election Results
Party	Candidate	Votes	%
Republican	Patricia "Pat" Wright (incumbent)	24,269	38.74%
Republican	C. W. "Bill" Lewis (incumbent)	22,532	35.97%
Democratic	Ron Larrabee	8,246	13.16%
Democratic	Joe D. Alvarado	7,596	12.13%
Total votes		62,643	100.00%
Republican hold			
Republican hold			

=== District 18 ===
Primary Election Results
Party	Candidate	Votes	%
Democratic Party Primary Results
Democratic	Jerome "Jerry" Denomme	2,689	100.00%
Total votes		2,689	100.00%
Republican Party Primary Results
Republican	Burton S. Barr (incumbent)	4,256	50.78%
Republican	Pete Dunn (incumbent)	4,125	49.22%
Total votes		8,381	100.00%
Libertarian Party Primary Results
Libertarian	Joe M. O'Connell	28	53.85%
Libertarian	Roy Schott	24	46.15%
Total votes		52	100.00%

General Election Results
Party	Candidate	Votes	%
Republican	Burton S. Barr (incumbent)	15,620	38.82%
Republican	Pete Dunn (incumbent)	14,394	35.77%
Democratic	Jerome "Jerry" Denomme	6,551	16.28%
Libertarian	Joe M. O'Connell	2,314	5.75%
Libertarian	Roy Schott	1,359	3.38%
Total votes		40,238	100.00%
Republican hold			
Republican hold			

=== District 19 ===
Primary Election Results
Party	Candidate	Votes	%
Democratic Party Primary Results
Democratic	Mark Winemiller	2,288	50.84%
Democratic	William "Bud" Waterworth Jr.	2,212	49.16%
Total votes		4,500	100.00%
Republican Party Primary Results
Republican	Tony West (incumbent)	4,048	51.57%
Republican	Jane Dee Hull (incumbent)	3,802	48.43%
Total votes		7,850	100.00%

General Election Results
Party	Candidate	Votes	%
Republican	Tony West (incumbent)	14,751	35.64%
Republican	Jane Dee Hull (incumbent)	14,228	34.37%
Democratic	Mark Winemiller	6,451	15.59%
Democratic	William "Bud" Waterworth Jr.	5,961	14.40%
Total votes		41,391	100.00%
Republican hold			
Republican hold			

=== District 20 ===
Primary Election Results
Party	Candidate	Votes	%
Democratic Party Primary Results
Democratic	Debbie McCune (incumbent)	2,933	57.36%
Democratic	Sue Huber	2,180	42.64%
Total votes		5,113	100.00%
Republican Party Primary Results
Republican	Lillian K. Jordan (incumbent)	2,691	53.61%
Republican	George Hussey	2,329	46.39%
Total votes		5,020	100.00%

General Election Results
Party	Candidate	Votes	%
Democratic	Debbie McCune (incumbent)	9,536	29.01%
Republican	Lillian K. Jordan (incumbent)	9,348	28.44%
Democratic	Sue Huber	7,094	21.58%
Republican	George Hussey	6,888	20.96%
Total votes		32,866	100.00%
Democratic hold			
Republican hold			

=== District 21 ===
Primary Election Results
Party	Candidate	Votes	%
Democratic Party Primary Results
Democratic	Shirley Bronski	2,508	54.32%
Democratic	Jerri Antunes	2,109	45.68%
Total votes		4,617	100.00%
Republican Party Primary Results
Republican	Elizabeth Adams Rockwell (incumbent)	2,595	42.04%
Republican	Donald J. Kenney (incumbent)	2,440	39.53%
Republican	W. Jack Kelly	1,137	18.42%
Total votes		6,172	100.00%
Libertarian Party Primary Results
Libertarian	Marjorie Groce	23	100.00%
Total votes		23	100.00%

General Election Results
Party	Candidate	Votes	%
Republican	Elizabeth Adams Rockwell (incumbent)	9,269	29.41%
Republican	Donald J. Kenney (incumbent)	9,215	29.24%
Democratic	Shirley Bronski	6,808	21.60%
Democratic	Jerri Antunes	5,117	16.23%
Libertarian	Marjorie Groce	1,110	3.52%
Total votes		31,519	100.00%
Republican hold			
Republican hold			

=== District 22 ===
Primary Election Results
Party	Candidate	Votes	%
Democratic Party Primary Results
Democratic	Art Hamilton (incumbent)	2,211	52.74%
Democratic	Earl V. Wilcox (incumbent)	1,981	47.26%
Total votes		4,192	100.00%
Libertarian Party Primary Results
Libertarian	Harold G. Beeman	8	50.00%
Libertarian	Donald Roy Dixon	8	50.00%
Total votes		16	100.00%

General Election Results
Party	Candidate	Votes	%
Democratic	Art Hamilton (incumbent)	6,708	39.54%
Democratic	Earl V. Wilcox (incumbent)	6,363	37.51%
Independent	"Leon" Thompson Jr.	1,721	10.15%
Libertarian	Donald Roy Dixon	855	5.04%
Libertarian	Harold G. Beeman	690	4.07%
Adult Consumer Taxpayer	Paul Dunakin	627	3.70%
Total votes		16,964	100.00%
Democratic hold			
Democratic hold			

=== District 23 ===
Primary Election Results
Party	Candidate	Votes	%
Democratic Party Primary Results
Democratic	Leon Thompson (incumbent)	1,731	54.49%
Democratic	Tony R. Abril (incumbent)	1,446	45.51%
Total votes		3,177	100.00%
Republican Party Primary Results
Republican	J. R. Schultz	24	100.00%
Total votes		24	100.00%
Libertarian Party Primary Results
Libertarian	Tyler Olson	3	100.00%
Total votes		3	100.00%

General Election Results
Party	Candidate	Votes	%
Democratic	Leon Thompson (incumbent)	4,127	37.84%
Democratic	Tony R. Abril (incumbent)	3,935	36.08%
Republican	J. R. Shultz (Note: The candidate's name is written as "Schultz" in the primary and "Shultz" in the general.)	1,472	13.50%
Independent	Ben Moreno	934	8.56%
Libertarian	Tyler Olson	438	4.02%
Total votes		10,906	100.00%
Democratic hold			
Democratic hold			

=== District 24 ===
Primary Election Results
Party	Candidate	Votes	%
Democratic Party Primary Results
Democratic	Jackie Stolls	270	100.00%
Total votes		270	100.00%
Republican Party Primary Results
Republican	Pete Corpstein (incumbent)	9,737	40.02%
Republican	Cal Holman (incumbent)	8,479	34.85%
Republican	Chris Herstam	6,112	25.12%
Total votes		24,328	100.00%
Libertarian Party Primary Results
Libertarian	Jim C. Cameron	42	51.22%
Libertarian	Charles R. Olsen	40	48.78%
Total votes		82	100.00%

General Election Results
Party	Candidate	Votes	%
Republican	Pete Corpstein (incumbent)	46,821	38.32%
Republican	Cal Holman (incumbent)	43,407	35.53%
Democratic	Jackie Stolls	19,214	15.73%
Libertarian	Jim C. Cameron	4,405	3.61%
Libertarian	Charles R. Olsen	4,343	3.55%
Independent/Non-Partisan	Pieter DeVries	3,994	3.27%
Total votes		122,184	100.00%
Republican hold			
Republican hold			

=== District 25 ===
Primary Election Results
Party	Candidate	Votes	%
Democratic Party Primary Results
Democratic	Glenn Davis	2,268	43.45%
Democratic	Paul C. Farrell	1,525	29.21%
Democratic	Conrad James Carreon	1,427	27.34%
Total votes		5,220	100.00%
Republican Party Primary Results
Republican	D. Lee Jones (incumbent)	2,212	41.31%
Republican	Ben Allen	1,666	31.11%
Republican	Marion Ruth Smith	1,477	27.58%
Total votes		5,355	100.00%
Libertarian Party Primary Results
Libertarian	Michael A. Miller	23	100.00%
Total votes		23	100.00%

General Election Results
Party	Candidate	Votes	%
Republican	D. Lee Jones (incumbent)	8,551	27.81%
Democratic	Glenn Davis	7,973	25.93%
Republican	Ben Allen	7,528	24.49%
Democratic	Paul C. Farrell	5,430	17.66%
Libertarian	Michael A. Miller	1,262	4.10%
Total votes		30,744	100.00%
Republican hold			
Democratic gain from Republican			

=== District 26 ===
Primary Election Results
Party	Candidate	Votes	%
Democratic Party Primary Results
Democratic	John F. Casey	2,258	54.48%
Democratic	George Hetrick	1,887	45.52%
Total votes		4,145	100.00%
Republican Party Primary Results
Republican	James "Jim" Meredith	4,643	42.92%
Republican	Frank Kelley (incumbent)	3,835	35.45%
Republican	Paul Smith	2,340	21.63%
Total votes		10,818	100.00%
Libertarian Party Primary Results
Libertarian	Joan L. Vanderslice	19	51.35%
Libertarian	Betty L. Murray	18	48.65%
Total votes		37	100.00%

General Election Results
Party	Candidate	Votes	%
Republican	James "Jim" Meredith	14,181	34.73%
Republican	Frank Kelley (incumbent)	13,221	32.38%
Democratic	John F. Casey	5,230	12.81%
Democratic	George Hetrick	4,970	12.17%
Libertarian	Betty L. Murray	1,890	4.63%
Libertarian	Joan L. Vanderslice	1,345	3.29%
Total votes		40,837	100.00%
Republican hold			
Republican hold			

=== District 27 ===
Primary Election Results
Party	Candidate	Votes	%
Democratic Party Primary Results
Democratic	Annette Lindsay	3,568	100.00%
Total votes		3,568	100.00%
Republican Party Primary Results
Republican	Juanita Harelson (incumbent)	4,131	39.12%
Republican	Doug Todd (incumbent)	3,984	37.72%
Republican	Scott R. Burge	1,397	13.23%
Republican	Richard S. "Rick" Robertson	1,049	9.93%
Total votes		10,561	100.00%

General Election Results
Party	Candidate	Votes	%
Republican	Juanita Harelson (incumbent)	22,431	38.92%
Republican	Doug Todd (incumbent)	21,935	38.06%
Democratic	Annette Lindsay	13,271	23.03%
Total votes		57,637	100.00%
Republican hold			
Republican hold			

=== District 28 ===
Primary Election Results
Party	Candidate	Votes	%
Democratic Party Primary Results
Democratic	Ed Baumgart	406	51.46%
Democratic	Carol Farnham	383	48.54%
Total votes		789	100.00%
Republican Party Primary Results
Republican	Paul R. Messinger (incumbent)	5,453	52.23%
Republican	Jim Skelly (incumbent)	4,988	47.77%
Total votes		10,441	100.00%

General Election Results
Party	Candidate	Votes	%
Republican	Paul R. Messinger (incumbent)	23,195	38.90%
Republican	Jim Skelly (incumbent)	20,868	35.00%
Democratic	Carol Farnham	8,270	13.87%
Democratic	Ed Baumgart	7,291	12.23%
Total votes		59,624	100.00%
Republican hold			
Republican hold			

=== District 29 ===
Primary Election Results
Party	Candidate	Votes	%
Republican Party Primary Results
Republican	Jim Cooper (incumbent)	5,793	38.23%
Republican	Donna Carlson West (incumbent)	5,627	37.13%
Republican	Wayne C. Pomeroy	3,735	24.65%
Total votes		15,155	100.00%
Libertarian Party Primary Results
Libertarian	Bev Chamberlain	3	50.00%
Libertarian	Mary Chamberlain	3	50.00%
Total votes		6	100.00%

General Election Results
Party	Candidate	Votes	%
Republican	Donna Carlson West (incumbent)	18,363	50.76%
Republican	Jim Cooper (incumbent)	17,815	49.24%
Total votes		36,178	100.00%
Republican hold			
Republican hold			

=== District 30 ===
Primary Election Results
Party	Candidate	Votes	%
Democratic Party Primary Results
Democratic	Harold Lindmark	4,523	100.00%
Total votes		4,523	100.00%
Republican Party Primary Results
Republican	James J. Sossaman (incumbent)	8,190	52.15%
Republican	Carl J. Kunasek (incumbent)	7,515	47.85%
Total votes		15,705	100.00%
Libertarian Party Primary Results
Libertarian	Jerry Foster	35	36.08%
Libertarian	Rondie Yancey	34	35.05%
Libertarian	Frank Brown	18	18.56%
Libertarian	Penelope N. Stanford	10	10.31%
Total votes		97	100.00%

General Election Results
Party	Candidate	Votes	%
Republican	James J. Sossaman (incumbent)	31,345	38.55%
Republican	Carl J. Kunasek (incumbent)	27,774	34.16%
Democratic	Harold Lindmark	12,068	14.84%
Libertarian	Jerry Foster	7,212	8.87%
Libertarian	Rondie Yancey	2,918	3.59%
Total votes		81,317	100.00%
Republican hold			
Republican hold			
