= Ray Rottas =

American politician

Member of the Arizona Senate
- In office 1971–1974
- In office 1977–1982

36th Treasurer of Arizona
- In office 1983–1991
- Governor: Bruce Babbitt; Evan Mecham; Rose Mofford
- Preceded by: Clark Dierks
- Succeeded by: Tony West

Personal details
- Born: October 20, 1927 Cleveland, Ohio, U.S.
- Died: July 11, 2011 (aged 83)
- Party: Republican

Ray Rottas (October 20, 1927 – July 11, 2011) was an American politician. He served as a Republican member of the Arizona Senate.

== Life and career ==
Rottas was born in Cleveland, Ohio.

Rottas served in the Arizona Senate from 1971 to 1974 and again from 1977 to 1982.

Rottas served as treasurer of Arizona from 1983 to 1991.

Rottas died on July 11, 2011, at the age of 83.
