= Anne Lindeman =

American politician

Member of the Arizona House of Representatives from the 17th district
- In office 1972–1976

Member of the Arizona Senate from the 17th district
- In office 1975–1986

Majority Whip of the Arizona State Senate
- In office 1983–1986

Personal details
- Born: September 10, 1932 East Orange, New Jersey
- Died: June 5, 2001 (aged 68) Peoria, Arizona
- Party: Republican
- Education: Indiana University; Antioch College

Anne Lindeman (September 10, 1932 – June 5, 2001) was an Arizona state legislator for more than a decade in the 1970s and 1980s. During her time in office, she advocated for the elderly and senior care, as well as expanding Arizona State University.

== Early life ==
Anne Wensley was born on September 10, 1932, in East Orange, New Jersey. Her father was a Westinghouse engineer who was often transferred to different plants, resulting in Anne moving around a lot in her childhood.

She graduated from high school in 1950 and enrolled at Antioch College. She later she became a registered nurse after transferring to and graduating from the Memorial Hospital School of Nursing in South Bend, Indiana.

She would marry Robert Lindeman right after graduating high school in 1950. She met Robert through her brother, who was his college roommate. Together they moved around frequently to places such as South Carolina, Oklahoma, and Arizona due to Robert’s deployment as an Air Force pilot. Anne Lindeman moved to Arizona in 1961 with her two children, with one on the way after the death of her husband, who died in a plane crash while deployed in Italy.

== Legislative service ==
Upon moving to the Maryvale neighborhood in Phoenix, Arizona, Lindeman hoped to find a nursing job. She could not find a nursing job due to a surplus in the market at that time. She instead received training as a secretary and began working for numerous state legislators. She volunteered for the Arizona GOP during this time as well, joining the Maryvale Federation of Republican Women and assisting with Barry Goldwater’s 1964 presidential bid. She became secretary to the Senate Education Committee in 1966 and served there until 1972 when she ran for the state House.

After successfully running as the Republican candidate for the Arizona House of Representatives, Lindeman would serve the 17th district there from 1972 until 1975. From 1975 to 1986, Lindeman served in the Arizona Senate, due to Arizona’s term limits. Lindeman was the first woman to hold the position of Majority Whip in the Arizona State Senate where she served from 1983 until 1986. In 1986, Lindeman wanted to further pursue her passion of education and ran for the office of superintendent of public instruction, but lost to C. Diane Bishop.

Lindeman’s main focuses were education, health and aging. She served as chairwoman of the Senate Education Committee and Health, Welfare and Education Committee for six and two years respectively.

Lindeman’s biggest legacy is her role in the establishment of Arizona State University’s west campus in Glendale. Since the mid 1970s, Lindeman created numerous legislative bills in both the House and Senate in order to create an ASU campus in the West Valley. In 1982, Lindeman found three hundred acres of state land that she wished to use as the site for ASU West and drafted Senate Bill 1200. In 1984, she drafted Senate Bill 1245, the legislation that created Arizona State University’s West Campus. Four years later, she would continue to help the success of the campus when she formed a lease-purchase agreement that freed up $48 million for additional construction of campus buildings and facilities. Lindeman was also a driving force behind a gerontology program at ASU West.

== Later endeavors ==
Lindeman served on the Intergovernmental Advisory Council on Education appointed by Ronald Reagan in 1985 and 1986. In 1991 Arizona Governor, Fife Symington, appointed her the Executive Director of the Governor’s Advisory Council on Aging. As Executive Director, she advocated for Arizona’s seniors in regard to issues that quality of life. She guided the commission to improve end-of-life care in the state in 1997. Her accomplishments related to seniors and aging have continue to impact the lives and wellbeing of Arizona’s older population and their families.

In 1998, after becoming a public affairs consultant, she co-chaired a group dedicated to improving the image of Maryvale. She attributed the decline of the community’s image to the large number of people moving elsewhere in the Phoenix area. She wanted to get community members together to talk and offer ideas on how to improve the area and its image as she felt many Valley leaders came from the Maryvale area.

== Death and legacy ==
Anne Lindeman died of heart disease on June 5, 2001, in Peoria, Arizona. She was 68 years old.

The Anne Lindeman Memorial Scholarship, which offers three $1,000 scholarships to Arizona resident students, was named in her honor.

Awards

- National Republican Legislator of the Year 1882
- ASU West Visionaries Award
- In 2011, Lindeman was posthumously inducted into the Arizona Women's Hall of Fame.
