= Political party strength in Arizona =

Politics in the US state of Arizona

== Partisan identification in the electorate ==
As of July 2025, Arizona's registered voters include 1,597,705 Republicans (35.7%), 1,270,307 Democrats (28.4%), 31,905 Libertarians (0.7%), 39,804 No Labels (0.9%), 5,045 Greens (0.1%), and 1,525,855 "Other" (34.1%).

== State politics ==
Most political offices are currently held by members of the Republican Party. Both U.S. Senators and 3 of out the 9 House of Representatives members are Democrats, (the other six are Republicans) Many were first elected in the 2018 elections. The following table indicates the political parties of elected officials in Arizona:

- Governor
- Secretary of State
- Attorney General
- State Treasurer
- Superintendent of Public Instruction
- State Mine Inspector

The table also indicates the historical party composition in the:

- State Senate
- State House of Representatives
- State Corporation Commission
- State delegation to the U.S. Senate
- State delegation to the U.S. House of Representatives

For years in which a presidential election was held, the table indicates which party's nominees received the state's electoral votes.

== Pre-statehood (1863–1911) ==
Year	Executive offices				Territorial Legislature		U.S. Congress
Year	Governor	Secretary of State	Attorney General	Supt. of Pub. Inst.	Senate	House	Delegate
1863	John A. Gurley (R) (Note: Appointed territorial governor by President Abraham Lincoln to be the first governor of the territory, but died on August 19, 1863, before he could arrive in the territory.)	Richard C. McCormick (R)	[?]	[?]	[?]	[?]	Charles D. Poston (R)
1863	John N. Goodwin (R) (Note: Gurley died prior to taking office as first appointed governor; Goodwin, who was Chief Justice of the Arizona Territorial Supreme Court, was appointed by Lincoln in his place.) (Note: Resigned to take an elected seat as delegate to the U.S. House of Representatives.)	Richard C. McCormick (R)	[?]	[?]	[?]	[?]	Charles D. Poston (R)
1864	John N. Goodwin (R)	Richard C. McCormick (R)	Coles Bashford (R) (Note: Attorney general of Arizona Territory appointed by Goodwin.)	[?]	[?]	[?]	Charles D. Poston (R)
1865	John N. Goodwin (R)	Richard C. McCormick (R)	Coles Bashford (R)	[?]	[?]	[?]	John N. Goodwin (R)
1866	John N. Goodwin (R)	Richard C. McCormick (R)	John A. Rush	[?]	[?]	[?]	John N. Goodwin (R)
1866	Richard C. McCormick (R)	James P. T. Carter (R)	John A. Rush	[?]	[?]	[?]	John N. Goodwin (R)
1867	Richard C. McCormick (R)	James P. T. Carter (R)	John A. Rush	[?]	[?]	[?]	Coles Bashford (I)
1868	Richard C. McCormick (R)	James P. T. Carter (R)	[?]	[?]	[?]	[?]	Coles Bashford (I)
1868	James P. T. Carter (R) (Note: Acting.)	James P. T. Carter (R)	[?]	[?]	[?]	[?]	Coles Bashford (I)
1869	James P. T. Carter (R)	Coles Bashford (R) (Note: Resigned.)	G. H. Oury (D)	[?]	[?]	[?]	Richard C. McCormick (U)
1869	Anson P. K. Safford (R)	Coles Bashford (R)	G. H. Oury (D)	[?]	[?]	[?]	Richard C. McCormick (U)
1870	Anson P. K. Safford (R)	Coles Bashford (R)	[?]	[?]	[?]	[?]	Richard C. McCormick (U)
1871	Anson P. K. Safford (R)	Coles Bashford (R)	[?]	[?]	[?]	[?]	Richard C. McCormick (U)
1872	Anson P. K. Safford (R)	Coles Bashford (R)	J. E. McCaffry	[?]	[?]	[?]	Richard C. McCormick (U)
1873	Anson P. K. Safford (R)	Coles Bashford (R)	[?]	[?]	[?]	[?]	Richard C. McCormick (U)
1874	Anson P. K. Safford (R)	Coles Bashford (R)	[?]	[?]	[?]	[?]	Richard C. McCormick (U)
1875	Anson P. K. Safford (R)	Coles Bashford (R)	[?]	[?]	[?]	[?]	Hiram Sanford Stevens (D)
1876	Anson P. K. Safford (R)	John Philo Hoyt (R)	[?]	[?]	[?]	[?]	Hiram Sanford Stevens (D)
1877	Anson P. K. Safford (R)	John Philo Hoyt (R)	[?]	[?]	[?]	[?]	Hiram Sanford Stevens (D)
1877	John Philo Hoyt (R)	John J. Gosper (R)	[?]	[?]	[?]	[?]	Hiram Sanford Stevens (D)
1878	John Philo Hoyt (R)	John J. Gosper (R)	[?]	[?]	[?]	[?]	Hiram Sanford Stevens (D)
1878	John C. Frémont (R) (Note: It is unknown when Frémont took the oath of office; he and his family arrived in Prescott on the afternoon of October 6, 1878.)	John J. Gosper (R)	[?]	[?]	[?]	[?]	Hiram Sanford Stevens (D)
1879	John C. Frémont (R)	John J. Gosper (R)	[?]	[?]	[?]	[?]	John G. Campbell (D)
1880	John C. Frémont (R)	John J. Gosper (R)	[?]	[?]	[?]	[?]	John G. Campbell (D)
1881	John C. Frémont (R)	John J. Gosper (R)	[?]	[?]	[?]	[?]	G. H. Oury (D)
1881	John J. Gosper (R)	John J. Gosper (R)	[?]	[?]	[?]	[?]	G. H. Oury (D)
1882	John J. Gosper (R)	John J. Gosper (R)	[?]	[?]	[?]	[?]	G. H. Oury (D)
1882	Frederick Augustus; Tritle (R)	Hiram M. Van Arman (R)	[?]	[?]	[?]	[?]	G. H. Oury (D)
1883	Frederick Augustus; Tritle (R)	Hiram M. Van Arman (R)	[?]	[?]	[?]	[?]	G. H. Oury (D)
1884	Frederick Augustus; Tritle (R)	Hiram M. Van Arman (R)	Clark Churchill (R)	[?]	[?]	[?]	G. H. Oury (D)
1885	Frederick Augustus; Tritle (R)	Hiram M. Van Arman (R)	Clark Churchill (R)	[?]	[?]	[?]	Curtis Coe Bean (R)
1885	C. Meyer Zulick (D)	James A. Bayard (D)	Clark Churchill (R)	[?]	[?]	[?]	Curtis Coe Bean (R)
1886	C. Meyer Zulick (D)	James A. Bayard (D)	Clark Churchill (R)	[?]	[?]	[?]	Curtis Coe Bean (R)
1887	C. Meyer Zulick (D)	James A. Bayard (D)	Briggs Goodrich	[?]	[?]	[?]	Marcus A. Smith (D)
1888	C. Meyer Zulick (D)	James A. Bayard (D)	John A. Rush	[?]	[?]	[?]	Marcus A. Smith (D)
1889	C. Meyer Zulick (D)	James A. Bayard (D)	Clark Churchill (R)	[?]	[?]	[?]	Marcus A. Smith (D)
1889	Lewis Wolfley (R)	Oakes Murphy (R)	Clark Churchill (R)	[?]	[?]	[?]	Marcus A. Smith (D)
1890	Lewis Wolfley (R)	Oakes Murphy (R)	Clark Churchill (R)	[?]	[?]	[?]	Marcus A. Smith (D)
1890	John N. Irwin (R)	Oakes Murphy (R)	Clark Churchill (R)	[?]	[?]	[?]	Marcus A. Smith (D)
1891	John N. Irwin (R)	Oakes Murphy (R)	Clark Churchill (R)	[?]	[?]	[?]	Marcus A. Smith (D)
1892	John N. Irwin (R)	Oakes Murphy (R)	William Herring (R)	[?]	[?]	[?]	Marcus A. Smith (D)
1892	Oakes Murphy (R)	Nathan A. Morford (R)	William Herring (R)	[?]	[?]	[?]	Marcus A. Smith (D)
1893	Oakes Murphy (R)	Nathan A. Morford (R)	John C. Herndon	[?]	[?]	[?]	Marcus A. Smith (D)
1893	L. C. Hughes (D) (Note: Hughes abolished many territorial offices, and unhappy officials successfully petitioned Cleveland to remove him.)	Charles Morelle; Bruce (D)	Francis J. Heney (R)	[?]	[?]	[?]	Marcus A. Smith (D)
1894	L. C. Hughes (D)	Charles Morelle; Bruce (D)	Francis J. Heney (R)	[?]	[?]	[?]	Marcus A. Smith (D)
1895	L. C. Hughes (D)	Charles Morelle; Bruce (D)	Thomas D. Satterwhite	[?]	[?]	[?]	Oakes Murphy (R)
1896	L. C. Hughes (D)	Charles Morelle; Bruce (D)	J. F. Wilson	[?]	[?]	[?]	Oakes Murphy (R)
1896	Charles Morelle Bruce (D)	Charles Morelle; Bruce (D)	J. F. Wilson	[?]	[?]	[?]	Oakes Murphy (R)
1896	Benjamin J. Franklin (D)	Charles Morelle; Bruce (D)	J. F. Wilson	[?]	[?]	[?]	Oakes Murphy (R)
1897	Benjamin J. Franklin (D)	Charles Morelle; Bruce (D)	J. F. Wilson	A. P. Shewman	[?]	[?]	Marcus A. Smith (D)
1897	Myron H. McCord (R)	Charles H. Akers (R)	J. F. Wilson	A. P. Shewman	[?]	[?]	Marcus A. Smith (D)
1898	Myron H. McCord (R)	Charles H. Akers (R)	C. M. Frazier	A. P. Shewman	[?]	[?]	Marcus A. Smith (D)
1898	Oakes Murphy (R) (Note: Asked by President Theodore Roosevelt to resign for opposing the Newlands Reclamation Act.)	Charles H. Akers (R)	Charles F. Ainsworth	A. P. Shewman	[?]	[?]	Marcus A. Smith (D)
1899	Oakes Murphy (R)	Charles H. Akers (R)	Charles F. Ainsworth	A. P. Shewman	[?]	[?]	John Frank Wilson (D)
1900	Oakes Murphy (R)	Charles H. Akers (R)	Charles F. Ainsworth	A. P. Shewman	[?]	[?]	John Frank Wilson (D)
1901	Oakes Murphy (R)	Charles H. Akers (R)	Charles F. Ainsworth	A. P. Shewman	[?]	[?]	Marcus A. Smith (D)
1902	Oakes Murphy (R)	Isaac T. Stoddard (R)	Edmund W. Wells (R)	[?]	[?]	[?]	Marcus A. Smith (D)
1902	Alexander Brodie (R)	Isaac T. Stoddard (R)	Edmund W. Wells (R)	[?]	[?]	[?]	Marcus A. Smith (D)
1903	Alexander Brodie (R)	Isaac T. Stoddard (R)	Edmund W. Wells (R)	[?]	[?]	[?]	John Frank Wilson (D)
1904	Alexander Brodie (R)	William F. Nichols (R)	Joseph Henry Kibbey (R)	[?]	[?]	[?]	John Frank Wilson (D)
1905	Alexander Brodie (R)	William F. Nichols (R)	E. S. Clark	[?]	[?]	[?]	Marcus A. Smith (D)
1905	William F. Nichols (R)	William F. Nichols (R)	E. S. Clark	[?]	[?]	[?]	Marcus A. Smith (D)
1905	Joseph Henry Kibbey (R)	William F. Nichols (R)	E. S. Clark	[?]	[?]	[?]	Marcus A. Smith (D)
1906	Joseph Henry Kibbey (R)	William F. Nichols (R)	E. S. Clark	[?]	[?]	[?]	Marcus A. Smith (D)
1907	Joseph Henry Kibbey (R)	William F. Nichols (R)	E. S. Clark	[?]	[?]	[?]	Marcus A. Smith (D)
1908	Joseph Henry Kibbey (R)	John H. Page (R)	E. S. Clark	[?]	[?]	[?]	Marcus A. Smith (D)
1909	Joseph Henry Kibbey (R)	John H. Page (R)	E. S. Clark	[?]	[?]	[?]	Ralph H. Cameron (R)
1909	Richard Elihu Sloan (R)	George U. Young (R)	E. S. Clark	[?]	[?]	[?]	Ralph H. Cameron (R)
1910	Richard Elihu Sloan (R)	George U. Young (R)	John B. Wright	[?]	[?]	[?]	Ralph H. Cameron (R)
1911	Richard Elihu Sloan (R)	George U. Young (R)	John B. Wright	[?]	[?]	[?]	Ralph H. Cameron (R)

== 1912–2026 ==
Year	Executive offices						State Legislature		Corp. Comm.	United States Congress			Electoral votes
Year	Governor	Secretary of State	Attorney General	Treasurer	Supt. of Pub. Inst.	Mine Inspector	Senate	House	Corp. Comm.	U.S. Senator (Class I)	U.S. Senator (Class III)	U.S. House	Electoral votes
1912	George W. P. Hunt (D)	Sidney Preston; Osborn (D)	George Purdy; Ballard (D)	David F. Johnson (D)	Charles O. Case (D)	G. H. Bolin (D)	15D, 4R	31D, 4R	3D	Henry F. Ashurst (D)	Marcus A. Smith (D)	Carl; Hayden (D)	Wilson/ Marshall (D) ✓
1913	George W. P. Hunt (D)	Sidney Preston; Osborn (D)	George Purdy; Ballard (D)	David F. Johnson (D)	Charles O. Case (D)	G. H. Bolin (D)	15D, 4R	31D, 4R	3D	Henry F. Ashurst (D)	Marcus A. Smith (D)	Carl; Hayden (D)	Wilson/ Marshall (D) ✓
1914	George W. P. Hunt (D)	Sidney Preston; Osborn (D)	George Purdy; Ballard (D)	David F. Johnson (D)	Charles O. Case (D)	G. H. Bolin (D)	15D, 4R	31D, 4R	3D	Henry F. Ashurst (D)	Marcus A. Smith (D)	Carl; Hayden (D)	Wilson/ Marshall (D) ✓
1915	George W. P. Hunt (D)	Sidney Preston; Osborn (D)	Wiley E. Jones (D)	Mit Simms (D)	Charles O. Case (D)	G. H. Bolin (D)	18D, 1R	35D	3D	Henry F. Ashurst (D)	Marcus A. Smith (D)	Carl; Hayden (D)	Wilson/ Marshall (D) ✓
1916	George W. P. Hunt (D)	Sidney Preston; Osborn (D)	Wiley E. Jones (D)	Mit Simms (D)	Charles O. Case (D)	G. H. Bolin (D)	18D, 1R	35D	3D	Henry F. Ashurst (D)	Marcus A. Smith (D)	Carl; Hayden (D)	Wilson/ Marshall (D) ✓
1917	Thomas E. Campbell (R) (Note: Campbell's narrow election win was overturned by the Arizona Supreme Court on December 22, 1917, which, following a recount, awarded the office to George W. P. Hunt. Campbell vacated the office three days later.)	Sidney Preston; Osborn (D)	Wiley E. Jones (D)	David F. Johnson (D)	Charles O. Case (D)	G. H. Bolin (D)	14D, 5R	31D, 4R	3D	Henry F. Ashurst (D)	Marcus A. Smith (D)	Carl; Hayden (D)	Wilson/ Marshall (D) ✓
1917	George W. P. Hunt (D)	Sidney Preston; Osborn (D)	Wiley E. Jones (D)	David F. Johnson (D)	Charles O. Case (D)	G. H. Bolin (D)	14D, 5R	31D, 4R	3D	Henry F. Ashurst (D)	Marcus A. Smith (D)	Carl; Hayden (D)	Wilson/ Marshall (D) ✓
1918	George W. P. Hunt (D)	Sidney Preston; Osborn (D)	Wiley E. Jones (D)	David F. Johnson (D)	Charles O. Case (D)	G. H. Bolin (D)	14D, 5R	31D, 4R	3D	Henry F. Ashurst (D)	Marcus A. Smith (D)	Carl; Hayden (D)	Wilson/ Marshall (D) ✓
1919	Thomas E. Campbell (R)	Mit Simms (D)	Wiley E. Jones (D)	Harry S. Ross (D)	Charles O. Case (D)	G. H. Bolin (D)	14D, 5R	26D, 9R	3D	Henry F. Ashurst (D)	Marcus A. Smith (D)	Carl; Hayden (D)	Wilson/ Marshall (D) ✓
1920	Thomas E. Campbell (R)	Mit Simms (D)	Wiley E. Jones (D)	Harry S. Ross (D)	Charles O. Case (D)	G. H. Bolin (D)	14D, 5R	26D, 9R	3D	Henry F. Ashurst (D)	Marcus A. Smith (D)	Carl; Hayden (D)	Harding/ Coolidge (R) ✓
1921	Thomas E. Campbell (R)	Ernest Hall (R)	W. J. Galbraith (R)	Raymond R. Earhart (D)	Elsie Toles (R)	John F. White (R)	10R, 9D	20D, 18R	3D	Henry F. Ashurst (D)	Ralph H. Cameron (R)	Carl; Hayden (D)	Harding/ Coolidge (R) ✓
1922	Thomas E. Campbell (R)	Ernest Hall (R)	W. J. Galbraith (R)	Raymond R. Earhart (D)	Elsie Toles (R)	John F. White (R)	10R, 9D	20D, 18R	3D	Henry F. Ashurst (D)	Ralph H. Cameron (R)	Carl; Hayden (D)	Harding/ Coolidge (R) ✓
1923	George W. P. Hunt (D)	James H. Kerby (D)	John W. Murphy (D)	Wayne Hubbs (D)	Charles O. Case (D)	Tom C. Foster (D)	18D, 1R	41D, 6R	3D	Henry F. Ashurst (D)	Ralph H. Cameron (R)	Carl; Hayden (D)	Harding/ Coolidge (R) ✓
1924	George W. P. Hunt (D)	James H. Kerby (D)	John W. Murphy (D)	Wayne Hubbs (D)	Charles O. Case (D)	Tom C. Foster (D)	18D, 1R	41D, 6R	3D	Henry F. Ashurst (D)	Ralph H. Cameron (R)	Carl; Hayden (D)	Coolidge/ Dawes (R) ✓
1925	George W. P. Hunt (D)	James H. Kerby (D)	John W. Murphy (D)	Vernon S. Wright (D)	Charles O. Case (D)	Tom C. Foster (D)	17D, 2R	41D, 6R	3D	Henry F. Ashurst (D)	Ralph H. Cameron (R)	Carl; Hayden (D)	Coolidge/ Dawes (R) ✓
1926	George W. P. Hunt (D)	James H. Kerby (D)	John W. Murphy (D)	Vernon S. Wright (D)	Charles O. Case (D)	Tom C. Foster (D)	17D, 2R	41D, 6R	3D	Henry F. Ashurst (D)	Ralph H. Cameron (R)	Carl; Hayden (D)	Coolidge/ Dawes (R) ✓
1927	George W. P. Hunt (D)	James H. Kerby (D)	John W. Murphy (D)	J. C. Callaghan (D)	Charles O. Case (D)	Tom C. Foster (D)	17D, 2R	43D, 9R	3D	Henry F. Ashurst (D)	Carl Hayden (D)	Lewis; Douglas (D)	Coolidge/ Dawes (R) ✓
1928	George W. P. Hunt (D)	James H. Kerby (D)	K. Berry Peterson (D)	J. C. Callaghan (D)	Charles O. Case (D)	Tom C. Foster (D)	17D, 2R	43D, 9R	3D	Henry F. Ashurst (D)	Carl Hayden (D)	Lewis; Douglas (D)	Hoover/ Curtis (R) ✓
1929	John Calhoun; Phillips (R)	J. C. Callaghan (D) (Note: Died in office.)	K. Berry Peterson (D)	Charles R. Price (D)	Charles O. Case (D)	Tom C. Foster (D)	17D, 2R	37D, 17R	3D	Henry F. Ashurst (D)	Carl Hayden (D)	Lewis; Douglas (D)	Hoover/ Curtis (R) ✓
1930	John Calhoun; Phillips (R)	Ike Fraizer (R) (Note: Appointed to fill a vacancy.)	K. Berry Peterson (D)	Charles R. Price (D)	Charles O. Case (D)	Tom C. Foster (D)	17D, 2R	37D, 17R	3D	Henry F. Ashurst (D)	Carl Hayden (D)	Lewis; Douglas (D)	Hoover/ Curtis (R) ✓
1931	George W. P. Hunt (D)	Scott White (D)	K. Berry Peterson (D)	Mit Simms (D)	Charles O. Case (D)	Tom C. Foster (D)	18D, 1R	52D, 12R	3D	Henry F. Ashurst (D)	Carl Hayden (D)	Lewis; Douglas (D)	Hoover/ Curtis (R) ✓
1932	George W. P. Hunt (D)	Scott White (D)	K. Berry Peterson (D)	Mit Simms (D)	Charles O. Case (D)	Tom C. Foster (D)	18D, 1R	52D, 12R	3D	Henry F. Ashurst (D)	Carl Hayden (D)	Lewis; Douglas (D)	Roosevelt/ Garner (D) ✓
1933	Benjamin Baker; Moeur (D)	James H. Kerby (D)	Arthur T. La Prade (D)	W. M. Cox (D)	Herman E. Hendrix (D)	Tom C. Foster (D)	19D	59D, 4R	3D	Henry F. Ashurst (D)	Carl Hayden (D)	Isabella; Greenway (D) (Note: Elected to fill the vacancy caused by the previous representative being elected to the next term, but resigning before the term began.)	Roosevelt/ Garner (D) ✓
1934	Benjamin Baker; Moeur (D)	James H. Kerby (D)	Arthur T. La Prade (D)	W. M. Cox (D)	Herman E. Hendrix (D)	Tom C. Foster (D)	19D	59D, 4R	3D	Henry F. Ashurst (D)	Carl Hayden (D)	Isabella; Greenway (D)	Roosevelt/ Garner (D) ✓
1935	Benjamin Baker; Moeur (D)	James H. Kerby (D)	John L. Sullivan (D)	Mit Simms (D)	Herman E. Hendrix (D)	Tom C. Foster (D)	18D, 1R	51D	3D	Henry F. Ashurst (D)	Carl Hayden (D)	Isabella; Greenway (D)	Roosevelt/ Garner (D) ✓
1936	Benjamin Baker; Moeur (D)	James H. Kerby (D)	John L. Sullivan (D)	Mit Simms (D)	Herman E. Hendrix (D)	Tom C. Foster (D)	18D, 1R	51D	3D	Henry F. Ashurst (D)	Carl Hayden (D)	Isabella; Greenway (D)	Roosevelt/ Garner (D) ✓
1937	Rawghlie Clement; Stanford (D)	James H. Kerby (D)	Joe Conway (D)	Harry M. Moore (D)	Herman E. Hendrix (D)	Tom C. Foster (D)	19D	50D, 1R	3D	Henry F. Ashurst (D)	Carl Hayden (D)	John R. Murdock (D)	Roosevelt/ Garner (D) ✓
1938	Rawghlie Clement; Stanford (D)	James H. Kerby (D)	Joe Conway (D)	Harry M. Moore (D)	Herman E. Hendrix (D)	Tom C. Foster (D)	19D	50D, 1R	3D	Henry F. Ashurst (D)	Carl Hayden (D)	John R. Murdock (D)	Roosevelt/ Garner (D) ✓
1939	Robert Taylor; Jones (D)	Harry M. Moore (D)	Joe Conway (D)	William G. Petersen (D)	Herman E. Hendrix (D)	Tom C. Foster (D)	19D	51D, 1R	3D	Henry F. Ashurst (D)	Carl Hayden (D)	John R. Murdock (D)	Roosevelt/ Garner (D) ✓
1940	Robert Taylor; Jones (D)	Harry M. Moore (D)	Joe Conway (D)	William G. Petersen (D)	Herman E. Hendrix (D)	Tom C. Foster (D)	19D	51D, 1R	3D	Henry F. Ashurst (D)	Carl Hayden (D)	John R. Murdock (D)	Roosevelt/ Wallace (D) ✓
1941	Sidney Preston; Osborn (D)	Harry M. Moore (D)	Joe Conway (D)	Joe Hunt (D)	E. D. Ring (D)	Tom C. Foster (D)	19D	53D	3D	Ernest McFarland (D)	Carl Hayden (D)	John R. Murdock (D)	Roosevelt/ Wallace (D) ✓
1942	Sidney Preston; Osborn (D)	Harry M. Moore (D)	Joe Conway (D)	Joe Hunt (D)	E. D. Ring (D)	Tom C. Foster (D)	19D	53D	3D	Ernest McFarland (D)	Carl Hayden (D)	John R. Murdock (D)	Roosevelt/ Wallace (D) ✓
1942	Sidney Preston; Osborn (D)	Dan Edward; Garvey (D) (Note: Initially appointed to fill a vacancy, subsequently elected in their own right.)	Joe Conway (D)	Joe Hunt (D)	E. D. Ring (D)	Tom C. Foster (D)	19D	53D	3D	Ernest McFarland (D)	Carl Hayden (D)	John R. Murdock (D)	Roosevelt/ Wallace (D) ✓
1943	Sidney Preston; Osborn (D)	Dan Edward; Garvey (D)	Joe Conway (D)	James D. Brush (D)	E. D. Ring (D)	Tom C. Foster (D)	19D	58D	3D	Ernest McFarland (D)	Carl Hayden (D)	2D	Roosevelt/ Wallace (D) ✓
1944	Sidney Preston; Osborn (D)	Dan Edward; Garvey (D)	John L. Sullivan (D)	Alva E. Weaver (D)	E. D. Ring (D)	Tom C. Foster (D)	19D	58D	3D	Ernest McFarland (D)	Carl Hayden (D)	2D	Roosevelt/ Truman (D) ✓
1945	Sidney Preston; Osborn (D)	Dan Edward; Garvey (D)	John L. Sullivan (D)	William T. Brooks (D)	E. D. Ring (D)	Clifford J. Murdock (D)	19D	57D, 1R	3D	Ernest McFarland (D)	Carl Hayden (D)	2D	Roosevelt/ Truman (D) ✓
1946	Sidney Preston; Osborn (D)	Dan Edward; Garvey (D)	John L. Sullivan (D)	William T. Brooks (D)	E. D. Ring (D)	Clifford J. Murdock (D)	19D	57D, 1R	3D	Ernest McFarland (D)	Carl Hayden (D)	2D	Roosevelt/ Truman (D) ✓
1947	Sidney Preston; Osborn (D)	Dan Edward; Garvey (D)	John L. Sullivan (D)	Mit Simms (D)	Nolan D. Pulliam (D)	Clifford J. Murdock (D)	19D	53D, 5R	3D	Ernest McFarland (D)	Carl Hayden (D)	2D	Roosevelt/ Truman (D) ✓
1948	Sidney Preston; Osborn (D)	Dan Edward; Garvey (D)	Evo Anton; DeConcini (D)	Mit Simms (D)	Nolan D. Pulliam (D)	Clifford J. Murdock (D)	19D	53D, 5R	3D	Ernest McFarland (D)	Carl Hayden (D)	2D	Roosevelt/ Truman (D) ✓
1948	Dan Edward; Garvey (D) (Note: As state secretary of state, filled unexpired term and was later elected in their own right.)	Curtis Williams (D)	Evo Anton; DeConcini (D)	Mit Simms (D)	Nolan D. Pulliam (D)	Clifford J. Murdock (D)	19D	53D, 5R	3D	Ernest McFarland (D)	Carl Hayden (D)	2D	Truman/ Barkley (D) ✓
1949	Dan Edward; Garvey (D)	Wesley Bolin (D)	Fred O. Wilson (D)	J. W. Kelly (D)	Marion Brooks (D)	Clifford J. Murdock (D)	19D	52D, 7R	3D	Ernest McFarland (D)	Carl Hayden (D)	2D	Truman/ Barkley (D) ✓
1950	Dan Edward; Garvey (D)	Wesley Bolin (D)	Fred O. Wilson (D)	J. W. Kelly (D)	Marion Brooks (D)	Clifford J. Murdock (D)	19D	52D, 7R	3D	Ernest McFarland (D)	Carl Hayden (D)	2D	Truman/ Barkley (D) ✓
1951	John Howard; Pyle (R)	Wesley Bolin (D)	Fred O. Wilson (D)	E. T. Williams Jr. (D)	Marion Brooks (D)	Clifford J. Murdock (D)	19D	61D, 10R	3D	Ernest McFarland (D)	Carl Hayden (D)	2D	Truman/ Barkley (D) ✓
1952	John Howard; Pyle (R)	Wesley Bolin (D)	Fred O. Wilson (D)	E. T. Williams Jr. (D)	Marion Brooks (D)	Clifford J. Murdock (D)	19D	61D, 10R	3D	Ernest McFarland (D)	Carl Hayden (D)	2D	Eisenhower/ Nixon (R) ✓
1953	John Howard; Pyle (R)	Wesley Bolin (D)	Ross F. Jones (R)	J. W. Kelly (D)	Marion Brooks (D)	Edward Massey (D)	15D, 4R	50D, 30R	3D	Barry Goldwater (R)	Carl Hayden (D)	1D, 1R	Eisenhower/ Nixon (R) ✓
1954	John Howard; Pyle (R)	Wesley Bolin (D)	Ross F. Jones (R)	J. W. Kelly (D)	Marion Brooks (D)	Edward Massey (D)	15D, 4R	50D, 30R	2D, 1R	Barry Goldwater (R)	Carl Hayden (D)	1D, 1R	Eisenhower/ Nixon (R) ✓
1955	Ernest McFarland (D)	Wesley Bolin (D)	Robert Morrison (D)	E. T. Williams Jr. (D)	Cliff Harkins (D)	Edward Massey (D)	26D, 2R	61D, 19R	3D	Barry Goldwater (R)	Carl Hayden (D)	1D, 1R	Eisenhower/ Nixon (R) ✓
1956	Ernest McFarland (D)	Wesley Bolin (D)	Robert Morrison (D)	E. T. Williams Jr. (D)	Cliff Harkins (D)	Edward Massey (D)	26D, 2R	61D, 19R	3D	Barry Goldwater (R)	Carl Hayden (D)	1D, 1R	Eisenhower/ Nixon (R) ✓
1957	Ernest McFarland (D)	Wesley Bolin (D)	Robert Morrison (D)	J. W. Kelly (D)	Marion Brooks (D)	Edward Massey (D)	26D, 2R	57D, 23R	3D	Barry Goldwater (R)	Carl Hayden (D)	1D, 1R	Eisenhower/ Nixon (R) ✓
1958	Ernest McFarland (D)	Wesley Bolin (D)	Robert Morrison (D)	J. W. Kelly (D)	Marion Brooks (D)	Edward Massey (D)	26D, 2R	57D, 23R	3D	Barry Goldwater (R)	Carl Hayden (D)	1D, 1R	Eisenhower/ Nixon (R) ✓
1959	Paul Fannin (R)	Wesley Bolin (D)	Robert Morrison (D)	H. Y. Sprague (D)	Wilburn W. Dick (D)	R. V. Hersey (D)	27D, 1R	55D, 25R	3D	Barry Goldwater (R)	Carl Hayden (D)	1D, 1R	Eisenhower/ Nixon (R) ✓
1960	Paul Fannin (R)	Wesley Bolin (D)	Wade Church (D)	John Quebedeaux (R)	Wilburn W. Dick (D)	R. V. Hersey (D)	27D, 1R	55D, 25R	3D	Barry Goldwater (R)	Carl Hayden (D)	1D, 1R	Nixon/ Lodge (R) ✗
1961	Paul Fannin (R)	Wesley Bolin (D)	Robert Pickrell (R)	J. W. Kelly (D)	Wilburn W. Dick (D)	R. V. Hersey (D)	24D, 4R	52D, 28R	3D	Barry Goldwater (R)	Carl Hayden (D)	1D, 1R	Nixon/ Lodge (R) ✗
1962	Paul Fannin (R)	Wesley Bolin (D)	Robert Pickrell (R)	J. W. Kelly (D)	Wilburn W. Dick (D)	R. V. Hersey (D)	24D, 4R	52D, 28R	3D	Barry Goldwater (R)	Carl Hayden (D)	1D, 1R	Nixon/ Lodge (R) ✗
1963	Paul Fannin (R)	Wesley Bolin (D)	Robert Pickrell (R)	Milton J. Husky (D)	Wilburn W. Dick (D)	R. V. Hersey (D)	24D, 4R	48D, 32R	2D, 1R	Barry Goldwater (R)	Carl Hayden (D)	2D, 1R	Nixon/ Lodge (R) ✗
1964	Paul Fannin (R)	Wesley Bolin (D)	Robert Pickrell (R)	Milton J. Husky (D)	Wilburn W. Dick (D)	R. V. Hersey (D)	24D, 4R	48D, 32R	2D, 1R	Barry Goldwater (R)	Carl Hayden (D)	2D, 1R	Goldwater/ Miller (R) ✗
1965	Sam Goddard Jr. (D)	Wesley Bolin (D)	Darrell F. Smith (R)	Bob Kennedy (D)	Sarah Folsom (R)	Verne C. McCutchan (R)	26D, 2R	45D, 35R	3D	Paul Fannin (R)	Carl Hayden (D)	2D, 1R	Goldwater/ Miller (R) ✗
1966	Sam Goddard Jr. (D)	Wesley Bolin (D)	Darrell F. Smith (R)	Bob Kennedy (D)	Sarah Folsom (R)	Verne C. McCutchan (R)	26D, 2R	45D, 35R	3D	Paul Fannin (R)	Carl Hayden (D)	2D, 1R	Goldwater/ Miller (R) ✗
1967	Jack Williams (R) (Note: The state constitution was amended in 1968 to increase gubernatorial terms from two to four years; Williams's first two terms were for two years, his third was for four years.)	Wesley Bolin (D)	Darrell F. Smith (R)	Charles H. Garland (R)	Sarah Folsom (R)	Verne C. McCutchan (R)	16R, 14D	33R, 27D	3D	Paul Fannin (R)	Carl Hayden (D)	2R, 1D	Goldwater/ Miller (R) ✗
1968	Jack Williams (R)	Wesley Bolin (D)	Darrell F. Smith (R)	Charles H. Garland (R)	Sarah Folsom (R)	Verne C. McCutchan (R)	16R, 14D	33R, 27D	3D	Paul Fannin (R)	Carl Hayden (D)	2R, 1D	Nixon/ Agnew (R) ✓
1969	Jack Williams (R)	Wesley Bolin (D)	Gary K. Nelson (R)	Morris A. Herring (R)	Weldon P. Shofstall (R)	Verne C. McCutchan (R)	17R, 13D	34R, 26D	2D, 1R	Paul Fannin (R)	Barry Goldwater (R)	2R, 1D	Nixon/ Agnew (R) ✓
1970	Jack Williams (R)	Wesley Bolin (D)	Gary K. Nelson (R)	Morris A. Herring (R)	Weldon P. Shofstall (R)	Verne C. McCutchan (R)	17R, 13D	34R, 26D	2R, 1D	Paul Fannin (R)	Barry Goldwater (R)	2R, 1D	Nixon/ Agnew (R) ✓
1971	Jack Williams (R)	Wesley Bolin (D)	Gary K. Nelson (R)	Ernest Garfield (R)	Weldon P. Shofstall (R)	Verne C. McCutchan (R)	18R, 12D	34R, 26D	3R	Paul Fannin (R)	Barry Goldwater (R)	2R, 1D	Nixon/ Agnew (R) ✓
1972	Jack Williams (R)	Wesley Bolin (D)	Gary K. Nelson (R)	Ernest Garfield (R)	Weldon P. Shofstall (R)	Verne C. McCutchan (R)	18R, 12D	34R, 26D	3R	Paul Fannin (R)	Barry Goldwater (R)	2R, 1D	Nixon/ Agnew (R) ✓
1973	Jack Williams (R)	Wesley Bolin (D)	Gary K. Nelson (R)	Bart Fleming (R)	Weldon P. Shofstall (R)	Verne C. McCutchan (R)	18R, 12D	38R, 22D	3R	Paul Fannin (R)	Barry Goldwater (R)	3R, 1D	Nixon/ Agnew (R) ✓
1974	Jack Williams (R)	Wesley Bolin (D)	N. Warner Lee (R)	Bart Fleming (R)	Weldon P. Shofstall (R)	Verne C. McCutchan (R)	18R, 12D	38R, 22D	3R	Paul Fannin (R)	Barry Goldwater (R)	3R, 1D	Nixon/ Agnew (R) ✓
1975	Raúl Héctor; Castro (D)	Wesley Bolin (D)	Bruce Babbitt (D)	Bart Fleming (R)	Carolyn Warner (D)	Bert C. Romero (D)	18D, 12R	33R, 27D	3R	Paul Fannin (R)	Barry Goldwater (R)	3R, 1D	Nixon/ Agnew (R) ✓
1976	Raúl Héctor; Castro (D)	Wesley Bolin (D)	Bruce Babbitt (D)	Bart Fleming (R)	Carolyn Warner (D)	Bert C. Romero (D)	18D, 12R	33R, 27D	3R	Paul Fannin (R)	Barry Goldwater (R)	3R, 1D	Ford/ Dole (R) ✗
1977	Raúl Héctor; Castro (D)	Wesley Bolin (D)	Bruce Babbitt (D)	Bart Fleming (R)	Carolyn Warner (D)	Verne C. McCutchan (R)	16D, 14R	38R, 22D	2R, 1D	Dennis DeConcini (D)	Barry Goldwater (R)	2R, 2D	Ford/ Dole (R) ✗
1977	Wesley Bolin (D) (Note: As state secretary of state, filled unexpired term.)	Rose Mofford (D)	Bruce Babbitt (D)	Bart Fleming (R)	Carolyn Warner (D)	Verne C. McCutchan (R)	16D, 14R	38R, 22D	2R, 1D	Dennis DeConcini (D)	Barry Goldwater (R)	2R, 2D	Ford/ Dole (R) ✗
1978	Wesley Bolin (D)	Rose Mofford (D)	Bruce Babbitt (D)	Bart Fleming (R)	Carolyn Warner (D)	Verne C. McCutchan (R)	16D, 14R	38R, 22D	2R, 1D	Dennis DeConcini (D)	Barry Goldwater (R)	2R, 2D	Ford/ Dole (R) ✗
1978	Bruce Babbitt (D) (Note: As state attorney general, filled unexpired term, and was later elected in his own right; the secretary of state at the time had been appointed, not elected, and was therefore, per the state Constitution, not in the line of succession.)	Rose Mofford (D)	Jack LaSota (D)	Bart Fleming (R)	Carolyn Warner (D)	Ted M. Martinez (D)	16D, 14R	38R, 22D	2R, 1D	Dennis DeConcini (D)	Barry Goldwater (R)	2R, 2D	Ford/ Dole (R) ✗
1979	Bruce Babbitt (D)	Rose Mofford (D)	Robert K. Corbin (R)	Clark Dierks (R)	Carolyn Warner (D)	James H. McCutchan (R)	16R, 14D	42R, 18D	2R, 1D	Dennis DeConcini (D)	Barry Goldwater (R)	2R, 2D	Ford/ Dole (R) ✗
1980	Bruce Babbitt (D)	Rose Mofford (D)	Robert K. Corbin (R)	Clark Dierks (R)	Carolyn Warner (D)	James H. McCutchan (R)	16R, 14D	42R, 18D	2R, 1D	Dennis DeConcini (D)	Barry Goldwater (R)	2R, 2D	Reagan/ Bush (R) ✓
1981	Bruce Babbitt (D)	Rose Mofford (D)	Robert K. Corbin (R)	Clark Dierks (R)	Carolyn Warner (D)	James H. McCutchan (R)	16R, 14D	43R, 17D	2R, 1D	Dennis DeConcini (D)	Barry Goldwater (R)	2R, 2D	Reagan/ Bush (R) ✓
1982	Bruce Babbitt (D)	Rose Mofford (D)	Robert K. Corbin (R)	Clark Dierks (R)	Carolyn Warner (D)	James H. McCutchan (R)	16R, 14D	43R, 17D	2R, 1D	Dennis DeConcini (D)	Barry Goldwater (R)	2R, 2D	Reagan/ Bush (R) ✓
1983	Bruce Babbitt (D)	Rose Mofford (D)	Robert K. Corbin (R)	Ray Rottas (R)	Carolyn Warner (D)	James H. McCutchan (R)	18R, 12D	39R, 21D	2R, 1D	Dennis DeConcini (D)	Barry Goldwater (R)	3R, 2D	Reagan/ Bush (R) ✓
1984	Bruce Babbitt (D)	Rose Mofford (D)	Robert K. Corbin (R)	Ray Rottas (R)	Carolyn Warner (D)	James H. McCutchan (R)	18R, 12D	39R, 21D	2R, 1D	Dennis DeConcini (D)	Barry Goldwater (R)	3R, 2D	Reagan/ Bush (R) ✓
1985	Bruce Babbitt (D)	Rose Mofford (D)	Robert K. Corbin (R)	Ray Rottas (R)	Carolyn Warner (D)	James H. McCutchan (R)	18R, 12D	38R, 22D	3D	Dennis DeConcini (D)	Barry Goldwater (R)	4R, 1D	Reagan/ Bush (R) ✓
1986	Bruce Babbitt (D)	Rose Mofford (D)	Robert K. Corbin (R)	Ray Rottas (R)	Carolyn Warner (D)	James H. McCutchan (R)	18R, 12D	38R, 22D	3D	Dennis DeConcini (D)	Barry Goldwater (R)	4R, 1D	Reagan/ Bush (R) ✓
1987	Evan Mecham (R) (Note: Impeached and removed from office on charges of obstruction of justice and misuse of government funds.)	Rose Mofford (D)	Robert K. Corbin (R)	Ray Rottas (R)	C. Diane Bishop (D)	James H. McCutchan (R)	19R, 11D	36R, 24D	2D, 1R	Dennis DeConcini (D)	John McCain (R)	4R, 1D	Reagan/ Bush (R) ✓
1988	Evan Mecham (R)	Rose Mofford (D)	Robert K. Corbin (R)	Ray Rottas (R)	C. Diane Bishop (D)	James H. McCutchan (R)	19R, 11D	36R, 24D	2D, 1R	Dennis DeConcini (D)	John McCain (R)	4R, 1D	Bush/ Quayle (R) ✓
1988	Rose Mofford (D)	James Shumway (D)	Robert K. Corbin (R)	Ray Rottas (R)	C. Diane Bishop (D)	James H. McCutchan (R)	19R, 11D	36R, 24D	2D, 1R	Dennis DeConcini (D)	John McCain (R)	4R, 1D	Bush/ Quayle (R) ✓
1989	Rose Mofford (D)	James Shumway (D)	Robert K. Corbin (R)	Ray Rottas (R)	C. Diane Bishop (D)	Douglas K. Martin (R)	17R, 13D	34R, 26D	2D, 1R	Dennis DeConcini (D)	John McCain (R)	4R, 1D	Bush/ Quayle (R) ✓
1990	Rose Mofford (D)	James Shumway (D)	Robert K. Corbin (R)	Ray Rottas (R)	C. Diane Bishop (D)	Douglas K. Martin (R)	17R, 13D	34R, 26D	2D, 1R	Dennis DeConcini (D)	John McCain (R)	4R, 1D	Bush/ Quayle (R) ✓
1991	Fife Symington (R)	Richard Mahoney (D)	Grant Woods (R)	Tony West (R)	C. Diane Bishop (D)	Douglas K. Martin (R)	17D, 13R	33R, 27D	2D, 1R	Dennis DeConcini (D)	John McCain (R)	4R, 1D	Bush/ Quayle (R) ✓
1992	Fife Symington (R)	Richard Mahoney (D)	Grant Woods (R)	Tony West (R)	C. Diane Bishop (D)	Douglas K. Martin (R)	17D, 13R	33R, 27D	2D, 1R	Dennis DeConcini (D)	John McCain (R)	4R, 1D	Bush/ Quayle (R) ✗
1993	Fife Symington (R)	Richard Mahoney (D)	Grant Woods (R)	Tony West (R)	C. Diane Bishop (D)	Douglas K. Martin (R)	18R, 12D	35R, 25D	2D, 1R	Dennis DeConcini (D)	John McCain (R)	3R, 3D	Bush/ Quayle (R) ✗
1994	Fife Symington (R)	Richard Mahoney (D)	Grant Woods (R)	Tony West (R)	C. Diane Bishop (D)	Douglas K. Martin (R)	18R, 12D	35R, 25D	2D, 1R	Dennis DeConcini (D)	John McCain (R)	3R, 3D	Bush/ Quayle (R) ✗
1995	Fife Symington (R)	Jane Dee Hull (R)	Grant Woods (R)	Tony West (R)	Lisa Graham; Keegan (R)	Douglas K. Martin (R)	19R, 11D	38R, 22D	2D, 1R	Jon Kyl (R)	John McCain (R)	5R, 1D	Bush/ Quayle (R) ✗
1996	Fife Symington (R)	Jane Dee Hull (R)	Grant Woods (R)	Tony West (R)	Lisa Graham; Keegan (R)	Douglas K. Martin (R)	19R, 11D	38R, 22D	2D, 1R	Jon Kyl (R)	John McCain (R)	5R, 1D	Clinton/ Gore (D) ✓
1997	Fife Symington (R)	Jane Dee Hull (R)	Grant Woods (R)	Tony West (R)	Lisa Graham; Keegan (R)	Douglas K. Martin (R)	18R, 12D	38R, 22D	2R, 1D	Jon Kyl (R)	John McCain (R)	5R, 1D	Clinton/ Gore (D) ✓
1997	Jane Dee Hull (R)	Betsey Bayless (R)	Grant Woods (R)	Tony West (R)	Lisa Graham; Keegan (R)	Douglas K. Martin (R)	18R, 12D	38R, 22D	2R, 1D	Jon Kyl (R)	John McCain (R)	5R, 1D	Clinton/ Gore (D) ✓
1998	Jane Dee Hull (R)	Betsey Bayless (R)	Grant Woods (R)	Tony West (R)	Lisa Graham; Keegan (R)	Douglas K. Martin (R)	18R, 12D	38R, 22D	2R, 1D	Jon Kyl (R)	John McCain (R)	5R, 1D	Clinton/ Gore (D) ✓
1999	Jane Dee Hull (R)	Betsey Bayless (R)	Janet Napolitano (D)	Carol Springer (R)	Lisa Graham; Keegan (R)	Douglas K. Martin (R)	16R, 14D	40R, 20D	3R	Jon Kyl (R)	John McCain (R)	5R, 1D	Clinton/ Gore (D) ✓
2000	Jane Dee Hull (R)	Betsey Bayless (R)	Janet Napolitano (D)	Carol Springer (R)	Lisa Graham; Keegan (R)	Douglas K. Martin (R)	16R, 14D	40R, 20D	3R	Jon Kyl (R)	John McCain (R)	5R, 1D	Bush/ Cheney (R) ✓
2001	Jane Dee Hull (R)	Betsey Bayless (R)	Janet Napolitano (D)	Carol Springer (R)	Jaime Molera (R)	Douglas K. Martin (R)	15R, 15D (Note: A power-sharing agreement was reached between the Democrats and three moderate Republicans, who elected Randall Gnant President Pro Tempore, and they organized the chamber with committees alternately being chaired by one party or the other. The twelve conservative Republicans organized as the minority faction in the chamber.)	36R, 24D	5R (Note: The state constitution was amended in 2000 to expand the Corporation Commission from three to five members and shorten term lengths from six to four years with the possibility to run for a second four-year term.)	Jon Kyl (R)	John McCain (R)	5R, 1D	Bush/ Cheney (R) ✓
2002	Jane Dee Hull (R)	Betsey Bayless (R)	Janet Napolitano (D)	Carol Springer (R)	Jaime Molera (R)	Douglas K. Martin (R)	15R, 15D	36R, 24D	5R	Jon Kyl (R)	John McCain (R)	5R, 1D	Bush/ Cheney (R) ✓
2003	Janet Napolitano (D)	Jan Brewer (R)	Terry Goddard (D)	David Petersen (R)	Tom Horne (R)	Douglas K. Martin (R)	17R, 13D	39R, 21D	5R	Jon Kyl (R)	John McCain (R)	6R, 2D	Bush/ Cheney (R) ✓
2004	Janet Napolitano (D)	Jan Brewer (R)	Terry Goddard (D)	David Petersen (R)	Tom Horne (R)	Douglas K. Martin (R)	17R, 13D	39R, 21D	5R	Jon Kyl (R)	John McCain (R)	6R, 2D	Bush/ Cheney (R) ✓
2005	Janet Napolitano (D)	Jan Brewer (R)	Terry Goddard (D)	David Petersen (R)	Tom Horne (R)	Douglas K. Martin (R)	18R, 12D	38R, 22D	5R	Jon Kyl (R)	John McCain (R)	6R, 2D	Bush/ Cheney (R) ✓
2006	Janet Napolitano (D)	Jan Brewer (R)	Terry Goddard (D)	Elliott Hibbs (R)	Tom Horne (R)	Douglas K. Martin (R)	18R, 12D	39R, 21D	5R	Jon Kyl (R)	John McCain (R)	6R, 2D	Bush/ Cheney (R) ✓
2007	Janet Napolitano (D)	Jan Brewer (R)	Terry Goddard (D)	Dean Martin (R)	Tom Horne (R)	Joe Hart (R)	17R, 13D	33R, 27D	5R	Jon Kyl (R)	John McCain (R)	4R, 4D	Bush/ Cheney (R) ✓
2008	Janet Napolitano (D)	Jan Brewer (R)	Terry Goddard (D)	Dean Martin (R)	Tom Horne (R)	Joe Hart (R)	17R, 13D	33R, 27D	5R	Jon Kyl (R)	John McCain (R)	4R, 4D	McCain/ Palin (R) ✗
2009	Jan Brewer (R)	Ken Bennett (R)	Terry Goddard (D)	Dean Martin (R)	Tom Horne (R)	Joe Hart (R)	18R, 12D	36R, 24D	3R, 2D	Jon Kyl (R)	John McCain (R)	5D, 3R	McCain/ Palin (R) ✗
2010	Jan Brewer (R)	Ken Bennett (R)	Terry Goddard (D)	Dean Martin (R)	Tom Horne (R)	Joe Hart (R)	18R, 12D	36R, 24D	3R, 2D	Jon Kyl (R)	John McCain (R)	5D, 3R	McCain/ Palin (R) ✗
2011	Jan Brewer (R)	Ken Bennett (R)	Tom Horne (R)	Doug Ducey (R)	John Huppenthal (R)	Joe Hart (R)	21R, 9D	40R, 20D	3R, 2D	Jon Kyl (R)	John McCain (R)	5R, 3D	McCain/ Palin (R) ✗
2012	Jan Brewer (R)	Ken Bennett (R)	Tom Horne (R)	Doug Ducey (R)	John Huppenthal (R)	Joe Hart (R)	21R, 9D	40R, 20D	3R, 2D	Jon Kyl (R)	John McCain (R)	5R, 3D	Romney/ Ryan (R) ✗
2013	Jan Brewer (R)	Ken Bennett (R)	Tom Horne (R)	Doug Ducey (R)	John Huppenthal (R)	Joe Hart (R)	17R, 13D	36R, 24D	5R	Jeff Flake (R)	John McCain (R)	5D, 4R	Romney/ Ryan (R) ✗
2014	Jan Brewer (R)	Ken Bennett (R)	Tom Horne (R)	Doug Ducey (R)	John Huppenthal (R)	Joe Hart (R)	17R, 13D	36R, 24D	5R	Jeff Flake (R)	John McCain (R)	5D, 4R	Romney/ Ryan (R) ✗
2015	Doug Ducey (R)	Michele Reagan (R)	Mark Brnovich (R)	Jeff DeWit (R)	Diane Douglas (R)	Joe Hart (R)	17R, 13D	36R, 24D	5R	Jeff Flake (R)	John McCain (R)	5R, 4D	Romney/ Ryan (R) ✗
2016	Doug Ducey (R)	Michele Reagan (R)	Mark Brnovich (R)	Jeff DeWit (R)	Diane Douglas (R)	Joe Hart (R)	18R, 12D	36R, 24D	5R	Jeff Flake (R)	John McCain (R)	5R, 4D	Trump/ Pence (R) ✓
2017	Doug Ducey (R)	Michele Reagan (R)	Mark Brnovich (R)	Jeff DeWit (R)	Diane Douglas (R)	Joe Hart (R)	17R, 13D	35R, 25D	5R	Jeff Flake (R)	John McCain (R)	5R, 4D	Trump/ Pence (R) ✓
2018	Doug Ducey (R)	Michele Reagan (R)	Mark Brnovich (R)	Jeff DeWit (R)	Diane Douglas (R)	Joe Hart (R)	17R, 13D	35R, 25D	5R	Jeff Flake (R)	John McCain (R)	5R, 4D	Trump/ Pence (R) ✓
2018	Doug Ducey (R)	Michele Reagan (R)	Mark Brnovich (R)	Eileen Klein (R)	Diane Douglas (R)	Joe Hart (R)	17R, 13D	35R, 25D	5R	Jeff Flake (R)	Jon Kyl (R)	5R, 4D	Trump/ Pence (R) ✓
2019	Doug Ducey (R)	Katie Hobbs (D)	Mark Brnovich (R)	Kimberly Yee (R)	Kathy Hoffman (D)	Joe Hart (R)	17R, 13D	31R, 29D	4R, 1D	Kyrsten Sinema (D)	Martha McSally (R)	5D, 4R	Trump/ Pence (R) ✓
2020	Doug Ducey (R)	Katie Hobbs (D)	Mark Brnovich (R)	Kimberly Yee (R)	Kathy Hoffman (D)	Joe Hart (R)	17R, 13D	31R, 29D	4R, 1D	Kyrsten Sinema (D)	Martha McSally (R)	5D, 4R	Biden/ Harris (D) ✓
2021	Doug Ducey (R)	Katie Hobbs (D)	Mark Brnovich (R)	Kimberly Yee (R)	Kathy Hoffman (D)	Joe Hart (R)	16R, 14D	31R, 29D	3R, 2D	Kyrsten Sinema (D)	Mark Kelly (D)	5D, 4R	Biden/ Harris (D) ✓
2022	Doug Ducey (R)	Katie Hobbs (D)	Mark Brnovich (R)	Kimberly Yee (R)	Kathy Hoffman (D)	Paul Marsh (R)	16R, 14D	31R, 29D	3R, 2D	Kyrsten Sinema (D)	Mark Kelly (D)	5D, 4R	Biden/ Harris (D) ✓
2023	Katie Hobbs (D)	Adrian Fontes (D)	Kris Mayes (D)	Kimberly Yee (R)	Tom Horne (R)	Paul Marsh (R)	16R, 14D	31R, 29D	4R, 1D	Kyrsten Sinema (I) (Note: Switched party from Democratic to Independent on December 9, 2022. She preserved her committee assignments and seniority through the Democratic Party. See Independent Democrat.)	Mark Kelly (D)	6R, 3D	Biden/ Harris (D) ✓
2024	Katie Hobbs (D)	Adrian Fontes (D)	Kris Mayes (D)	Kimberly Yee (R)	Tom Horne (R)	Paul Marsh (R)	16R, 14D	31R, 29D	4R, 1D	Kyrsten Sinema (I)	Mark Kelly (D)	6R, 3D	Trump/ Vance (R) ✓
2025	Katie Hobbs (D)	Adrian Fontes (D)	Kris Mayes (D)	Kimberly Yee (R)	Tom Horne (R)	Paul Marsh (R)	17R, 13D	33R, 27D	5R	Ruben Gallego (D)	Mark Kelly (D)	6R, 3D	Trump/ Vance (R) ✓
2025	Katie Hobbs (D)	Adrian Fontes (D)	Kris Mayes (D)	Kimberly Yee (R)	Tom Horne (R)	Les Presmyk (R)	17R, 13D	33R, 27D	5R	Ruben Gallego (D)	Mark Kelly (D)	6R, 3D	Trump/ Vance (R) ✓
2026	Katie Hobbs (D)	Adrian Fontes (D)	Kris Mayes (D)	Kimberly Yee (R)	Tom Horne (R)	Les Presmyk (R)	17R, 13D	33R, 27D	5R	Ruben Gallego (D)	Mark Kelly (D)	6R, 3D	Trump/ Vance (R) ✓

== From 2027 ==
In 2026, Arizonans will elect a lieutenant governor for the first time, pursuant to Proposition 131 in 2022.

Year	Executive offices							State Legislature		Corp. Comm.	United States Congress			Electoral votes
Year	Governor	Lieutenant Governor	Secretary of State	Attorney General	Treasurer	Supt. of Pub. Inst.	Mine Inspector	Senate	House	Corp. Comm.	U.S. Senator (Class I)	U.S. Senator (Class III)	U.S. House	Electoral votes
2027	Katie Hobbs (D)	John Giles (I)	Adrian Fontes (D)	Kris Mayes (D)	Nick Mansour (D)	Teresa Leyba Ruiz (D)	Brian Matlock (D)	20D, 10R	37D, 23R	3R, 2D	Ruben Gallego (D)	Mark Kelly (D)	5D, 4R	Trump/ Vance (R) ✓

Key to party colors and abbreviations for members of the U.S. Congress and other politicians or officials
Alaskan Independence (AKIP) Know Nothing (KN) American Labor (AL) Anti-Jacksonian (Anti-J); National Republican (NR) Anti-Administration (AA) Anti-Masonic (Anti-M) Conservative (Con) Covenant (Cov)	Democratic (D) Democratic–Farmer–Labor (DFL) Democratic–NPL (D-NPL) Dixiecrat (Dix), States' Rights (SR) Democratic-Republican (DR) Farmer–Labor (FL) Federalist (F); Pro-Administration (PA)	Free Soil (FS) Fusion (Fus) Greenback (GB) Independence (IPM) Jacksonian (J) Liberal (Lib) Libertarian (L) National Union (NU)	Nonpartisan League (NPL) Nullifier (N) Opposition Northern (O); Opposition Southern (O) Populist (Pop) Progressive (Prog) Prohibition (Proh) Readjuster (Rea)	Republican (R) Silver (Sv) Silver Republican (SvR) Socialist (Soc) Union (U) Unconditional Union (UU) Vermont Progressive (VP) Whig (W)	Independent (I) Nonpartisan (NP)

== See also ==
- Law and government in Arizona
- List of Arizona state legislatures
