= Robert K. Corbin =

American lawyer and politician (1928–2025)

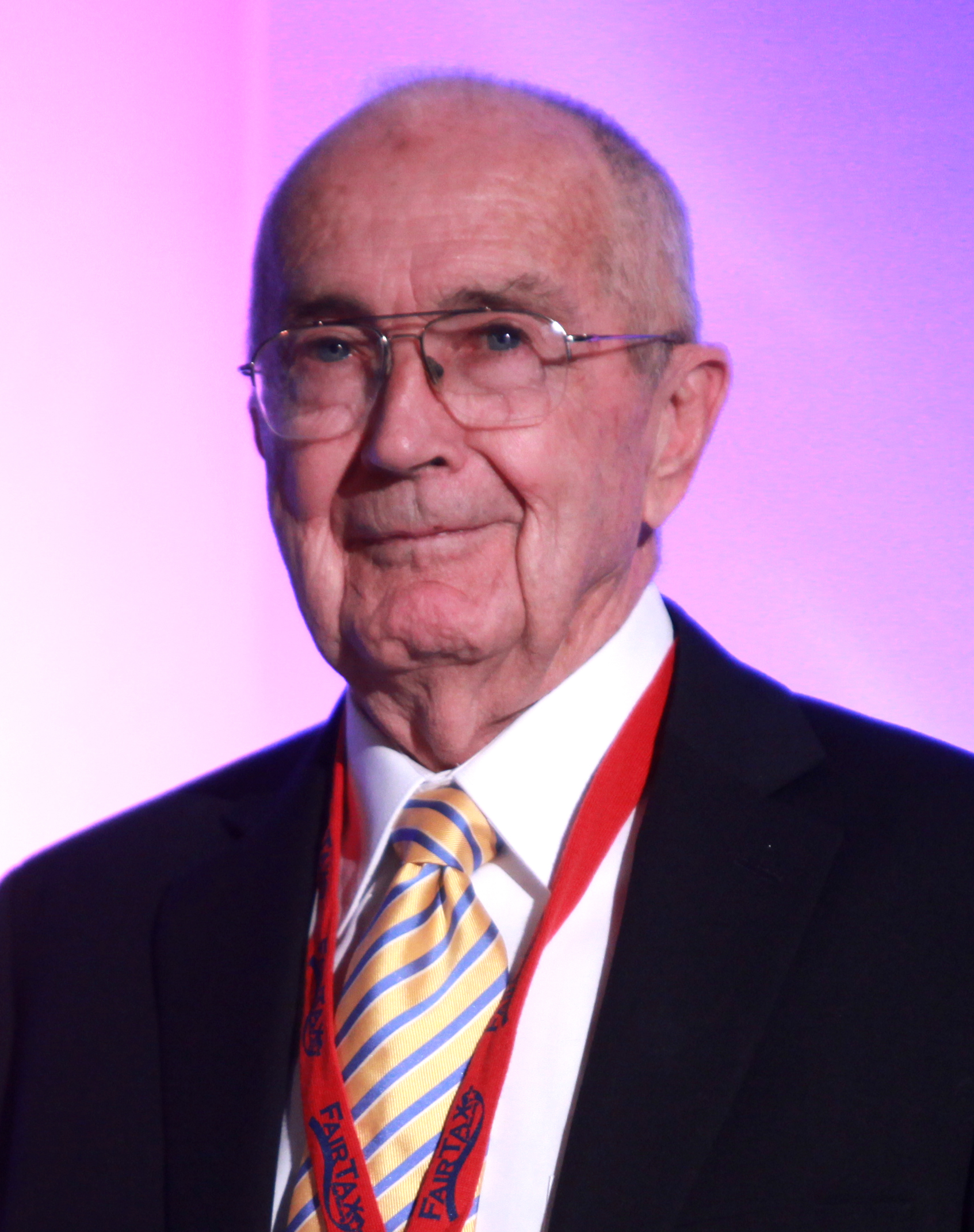
- Corbin in 2014

21st Attorney General of Arizona
- In office January 1979 – January 1991
- Governor: Bruce Babbitt; Evan Mecham; Rose Mofford
- Preceded by: Jack LaSota
- Succeeded by: Grant Woods

Personal details
- Born: Robert Keith Corbin; November 17, 1928 Worthington, Indiana, U.S.
- Died: September 9, 2025 (aged 96) Arizona, U.S.
- Party: Republican
- Spouse(s): Helen Corbin (m. 1959; died 2008) Lori Klein
- Children: 3
- Education: Indiana University Bloomington

Military service
- Allegiance: United States
- Branch: United States Navy
- Service years: 1946–1948

Robert Keith Corbin (November 17, 1928 – September 9, 2025) was an American lawyer and politician from the state of Arizona who served as Attorney General of Arizona. He later served as president of the National Rifle Association of America from 1992 until 1993.

== Early life and education ==
Corbin was born in Worthington, Indiana, on November 17, 1928. After completing high school he joined the United States Navy in 1946. He later attended Indiana University Bloomington.

== Career ==
Corbin started working as a Maricopa Deputy County Attorney in 1958. He was elected Maricopa County Attorney in 1964 and served one term. He was elected to the Maricopa County Board of Supervisors in 1972, and Attorney General in November 1978 and served until his retirement in January 1991, holding that office longer than any other elected official.

== Attorney general ==
Corbin prosecuted Republican Governor Evan Mecham for misusing campaign contributions. Charges were dismissed after Mecham was impeached.

In 1987, Corbin indicted former congressman Sam Steiger for extorting a member of the parole board. Steiger was convicted but it was overturned on appeal.

== Personal life and death ==
Corbin was married to Republican National Committee woman Lori Klein Corbin. Corbin was married to Helen Corbin from 1959 until her death in 2008. They had three daughters: Deborah, Lori, and Kathy.

Corbin died from cardiac arrest at his home in Arizona, on September 9, 2025, at the age of 96.

National Rifle Association of America
Preceded by Richard D. Riley	President of the NRA; 1992–1993	Succeeded by Thomas L. Washington
