= Bill Clinton Supreme Court candidates =

President Bill Clinton made two appointments to the Supreme Court of the United States, both during his first term.

On March 19, 1993, Associate Justice Byron White announced his retirement (and assumption of senior status), which ultimately took effect June 28, 1993. President Clinton announced Ruth Bader Ginsburg as White's replacement on June 15, 1993, and she was confirmed by the United States Senate on August 3, 1993.

On April 6, 1994, Associate Justice Harry Blackmun announced his retirement (and assumption of senior status), which ultimately took effect August 3, 1994. President Clinton announced Stephen Breyer as Blackmun's replacement on May 13, 1994, with the United States Senate confirming Breyer on July 29, 1994.

== Overview ==
Throughout much of the history of the United States, the Supreme Court of the United States was considered the least powerful branch of the government, and nominations to that body, although important, were not the source of great political controversy as they are today. Furthermore, Clinton's Supreme Court nominations were the first by a Democratic president since President Lyndon Johnson's controversial and failed nomination of Abe Fortas to be Chief Justice of the United States in 1968.

== Politics ==
When asked about the kind of justices he would appoint to the Supreme Court, President Bill Clinton insisted that he had no litmus test for his justice, but at the same time, that he only wanted justices who would be pro-choice when it came to abortion. "I will appoint judges to the Supreme Court who believe in the constitutional right to privacy, including the right to choose", Clinton said in an interview on April 5, 1992. In an interview on June 18, 1992, Clinton said, "I don't believe in the litmus test for Supreme Court judges, but I do think that the Court has been so politicized by the recent appointments under the last two presidents that we ought to appoint someone who can provide some balance; someone who everybody will say, 'There is someone who can be a great judge and someone who believes in the Constitution, the Bill of Rights and protecting the rights of ordinary citizens to be let alone from undue intrusion by their government.'" In addition, Clinton said he felt it was unhealthy that the court was dominated by former judges, most of whom, he felt, lacked adequate real-world experience. Clinton also made clear he was interested in shifting the dynamics of the court. "Look, the court is totally fragmented and it's dominated by Republican appointees", he said. "It's not enough for someone to vote the right way. We've got to get someone who will move people, who will persuade the others to join them. It's what Warren did. I want someone like that."

== Ruth Bader Ginsburg nomination ==
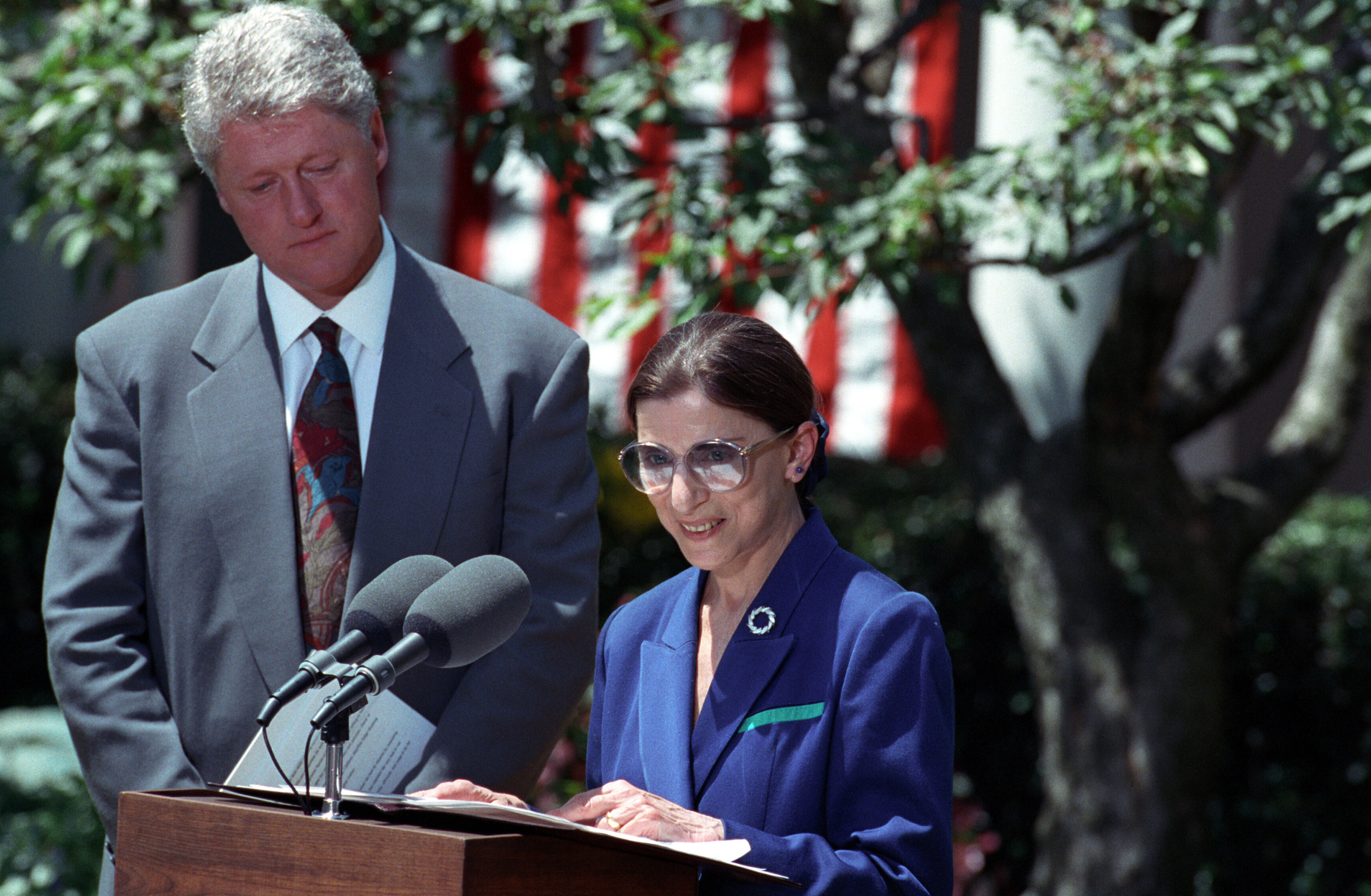
Ginsburg accepting her nomination from Bill Clinton

After Byron White announced his retirement on March 19, 1993, Clinton began a weeks-long journey through consideration of an unusually large number of candidates. The name that came up that interested Clinton the most was that of New York Governor Mario Cuomo. Clinton offered White's seat first to Cuomo, who initially had told confidants that he was willing to take the seat, but then changed his mind and faxed Clinton a letter telling him that his duty to residents of his state was more important than his desire to serve on the court.

Liberal lawyers wanted Harvard Law professor and constitutional scholar Laurence Tribe, but Clinton and his aides next considered several candidates as "outside-the-box" choices. Clinton played with the idea of nominating a brilliant political philosopher instead of a practicing attorney. Professors Stephen L. Carter of Yale and Michael Sandel of Harvard would have fit the bill, and the wildest fantasy put forth was the nomination of Clinton's wife, Hillary Clinton, but there was a problem associated with such a selection. George Stephanopoulos, a Clinton aide at the time, writes that the idea was dropped because the president's "choice had to be ratified by the Senate, where Republicans hadn't forgotten the rejection of Robert Bork, and Democrats were reeling from their recent encounters with Zoe Baird, Kimba Wood, and Lani Guinier. Sexy was good, but safe was better. We simply couldn't afford another failed nomination." Stephanopoulos quotes Clinton himself saying, "We don't need another gang-that-couldn't-shoot-straight story."

Clinton then turned to other politicians. First was U.S. Senator George J. Mitchell of Maine, who declined on the spot, desiring to stay in the Senate and help to pass Clinton's legislation. Clinton next approached his Secretary of Education, Richard Riley, a former Governor of South Carolina who also said no. "I was a mediocre country lawyer", Riley told Clinton. "This isn't my thing." Clinton next considered his Secretary of the Interior, Bruce Babbitt, a former Arizona Governor. Clinton prepared to nominate Babbitt when two problems surfaced – a false published report about gambling debts in Las Vegas and opposition to Babbitt's nomination voiced by Senator Orrin Hatch, who was the ranking Republican on the United States Senate Judiciary Committee. Hatch had told Clinton that Babbitt's strong pro-environmental views had enraged a group of Republican senators in the western United States who might take revenge either on Babbitt's nomination or on the candidate Clinton nominated to replace him in the Department of the Interior. Clinton chose not to proceed with Babbitt's nomination.

Clinton then turned to existing judges. He considered Eighth Circuit judge Richard S. Arnold, who was not a close friend of Clinton's but who was from Clinton's home state of Arkansas. The President very much wanted to nominate Arnold but feared the nomination might be viewed as cronyism. He then weighed Sixth Circuit judge Gilbert S. Merritt, who was a family friend of Vice President Al Gore. However, a problem surfaced relating to Merritt's tenure as a U.S. attorney in the 1960s, and Clinton decided not to proceed with him. Clinton then asked his staff about Janie Shores, who had been the first woman to serve on the Alabama Supreme Court but who was not well known in Washington, D.C. legal circles. In addition, Shores' constitutional views were completely unknown to Clinton or anyone else on his team. "You are not nominating Janie Shores to the Supreme Court", White House counsel Bernard W. Nussbaum told Clinton. "No one knows who she is. This is insane."

The next name Clinton considered was that of First Circuit judge Stephen Breyer. Clinton's staff had liked Breyer, but given an injury that he had sustained just a few days earlier, Breyer was in a significant amount of pain. During his interview with Clinton, Breyer was short of breath and in pain. Clinton ultimately decided that Breyer seemed "heartless." "I don't see enough humanity", Clinton told his staff. "I want a judge with soul."

Clinton then considered a list of "firsts" for diversity purposes: David Tatel, a Washington lawyer who had served in the Carter Administration who would be the first blind justice; José A. Cabranes, a district court judge who would be the first Hispanic justice, and D.C. Circuit judge Ruth Bader Ginsburg, who, Stephanopoulos writes, "would be the first Jewish justice since Abe Fortas, and the first woman to be appointed by a Democrat. More important, she was a pioneer in the legal fight for women's rights – a female Thurgood Marshall." In addition, Ginsburg was noted as moderate-to-conservative on criminal matters and had a different rationale for supporting Roe v. Wade than most liberals: she considered laws banning abortion a form of sex discrimination rather than a violation of privacy. Hatch told Clinton that he would support Ginsburg as well.

At that point, however, Cuomo's oldest son who served as an official in the Clinton Administration, Andrew Cuomo, contacted Clinton's staff to inquire if the President had made a final decision yet. Mario Cuomo, his son said, believed that Clinton was about to name Breyer to the court and as a result thought that Clinton would not name two white males in a row. As such, the governor believed that his own chances were now or never. Clinton still was interested in nominating Cuomo, telling his staff that the governor "will sing the song of America. It'll be like watching Pavarotti at Christmas time." Clinton then interviewed Ginsburg, and then took a phone call from Cuomo, who backed out of consideration for a second time. The next day, on June 15, 1993, Clinton announced that he had chosen Ginsburg. The Senate confirmed Ginsburg in a 96–3 vote on August 3, 1993. Senators Jesse Helms (R-NC), Don Nickles (R-OK) and Bob Smith (R-NH) voted against the nomination. Donald Riegle (D-MI) did not vote.

== Stephen Breyer nomination ==
After Harry Blackmun announced his retirement on April 6, 1994, Clinton again asked Mitchell, who had announced that he would not stand for reelection in November 1994, to be his nominee. Mitchell told Clinton that he did not want to be a Supreme Court Justice. Clinton also asked Babbitt, who asked not to be considered.

At that point, Clinton again considered Arnold, who had been recommended by over 100 federal judges in a joint letter written after Blackmun had retired. Clinton's willingness to proceed with Arnold, however, was complicated by the fact that Arnold had been diagnosed with low-grade non-Hodgkin's lymphoma in 1976 and had since suffered from tumors that had spread to other parts of his body. Although Arnold was functioning normally, his doctor told the President that Arnold had cancer all through his body and that there was no way he could say that Arnold's disease "would not interfere" with Supreme Court duties.

Finally, Clinton announced on May 13, 1994, that he would nominate Breyer to the Supreme Court. The Senate confirmed Breyer in an 87 to 9 vote on July 29, 1994. Senators Conrad Burns (R-MT), Dan Coats (R-IN), Paul Coverdell (R-GA), Jesse Helms (R-NC), Trent Lott (R-MS), Richard Lugar (R-IN), Frank Murkowski (R-AK), Don Nickles (R-OK), and Bob Smith (R-NH) voted against the nomination. Senators David Durenberger (R-MN), Bob Graham (D-FL), Claiborne Pell (D-RI) and Malcolm Wallop (R-WY) did not vote.

== Names frequently mentioned ==
Following is a list of individuals who were mentioned in various news accounts and books as having been considered by Clinton or being the most likely potential nominees for a Supreme Court appointment under Clinton:

=== United States courts of appeals ===
U.S. Courts of Appeals

- Court of Appeals for the 1st Circuit
  - Stephen Breyer (born 1938) (nominated and confirmed)
- Court of Appeals for the 2nd Circuit
  - Amalya Kearse (born 1937)
  - Sonia Sotomayor (born 1954) (subsequently nominated by Barack Obama and confirmed in 2009)
- Court of Appeals for the 6th Circuit
  - Gilbert S. Merritt Jr. (1936–2022)
- Court of Appeals for the 8th Circuit
  - Richard S. Arnold (1936–2004)
- Court of Appeals for the D.C. Circuit
  - Ruth Bader Ginsburg (1933–2020) (nominated and confirmed)
  - Patricia Wald (1928–2019)

=== State supreme courts ===
- Janie Shores (1932–2017) – Associate Justice, Alabama Supreme Court

=== United States district courts ===
- José A. Cabranes (born 1940) – judge on the United States District Court for the District of Connecticut; subsequently a judge on the United States Court of Appeals for the Second Circuit

=== United States senators ===
- George J. Mitchell (born 1933) – U.S. senator from Maine
- Joe Lieberman (1942–2024) – U.S. senator from Connecticut

=== United States governors ===
- Mario Cuomo (1932–2015) – Governor of New York

=== Executive branch officials ===
- Richard Riley (born 1933) – United States Secretary of Education; former governor of South Carolina
- Bruce Babbitt (born 1938) – United States Secretary of the Interior; former governor of Arizona

=== Other backgrounds ===
- Guido Calabresi (born 1932) – Dean of Yale Law School; subsequently a judge on the United States Court of Appeals for the Second Circuit
- Stephen L. Carter (born 1954) – professor at Yale Law School
- Hillary Clinton (born 1947) – First Lady; subsequently a Senator from New York and 67th U.S Secretary of State
- Walter Dellinger (1941–2022) – Assistant Attorney General; former professor, Duke University School of Law
- Barbara Jordan (1936–1996) – former member of the U.S. House of Representatives from Texas
- Michael Sandel (born 1953) – professor at Harvard University
- David S. Tatel (born 1942) – private attorney; subsequently a judge on the United States Court of Appeals for the District of Columbia Circuit
- Laurence Tribe (born 1941) – professor at Harvard Law School

== See also ==
- United States federal judge
- Judicial appointment history for United States federal courts
- List of federal judges appointed by Bill Clinton
