= Wampumgate =

1995 controversy in the United States

Wampumgate refers to the controversy around the July 14, 1995 rejection of an Indian gambling project proposed by three impoverished Chippewa Indian tribes who hoped to establish a casino in Hudson, Wisconsin, located just outside the Twin Cities of Minneapolis–Saint Paul.

== Background ==
Documents uncovered by Congressional investigators, lawsuits and an Independent Counsel (Carol Elder Bruce) showed evidence that political contributions and pressure from lobbyists from rival tribes caused Bruce Babbitt to overrule staff recommendations and deny the casino application. The opposing tribes included the Ho-Chunk, Mdewankaton Sioux and six other tribes, mostly from neighboring Minnesota, who felt the Hudson casino would interfere with their own highly lucrative gambling operations. When Babbitt gave conflicting explanations of the incident to Congressional leaders, Attorney Gen Janet Reno, who had resisted an independent probe of campaign finance, asked a judicial panel to appoint an outside prosecutor to probe Bruce Babbitt's role in the rejection as well as the influence of campaign contributions.

== Attempt to investigate campaign contributions ==
The Chippewas engaged Phoenix attorney and longtime Babbitt confidant Paul Eckstein to act as an informal liaison with Babbitt. Eckstein later became incensed when Babbitt hinted to him at a private meeting that the decision to turn down the tribes was influenced by campaign contributions from the opponents. Janet Reno denied the independent counsel right to probe broader campaign fund-raising issues in the Clinton administration.

=== Response from the Clinton Administration ===
President Clinton supported Bruce Babbitt in his overruling regional officials from the Department of the Interior. Records from the Interior Department showed that the office of Harold M. Ickes, then President Clinton's Deputy Chief of Staff, did in fact contact Babbitt's aides about the Hudson project. In addition, Donald Fowler, chairman of the Democratic National Committee, made phone calls to senior Interior Department staff on behalf of the opposition and there were numerous contacts between Interior staff and lobbyists and officials from the opposing tribes. One prominent lobbyist, Patrick O'Connor, spoke directly with President Clinton in Minneapolis about the matter, triggering calls to the White House from Air Force One by Bruce Lindsey. O'Connor later contacted Ickes directly regarding Hudson.

=== Support for the tribes ===
The wealthy tribes had strong support from influential people, including Fowler. They were also supported by Sen. Paul Wellstone and U.S. Reps Jim Oberstar, David Obey and Tom Barrett, particularly Wellstone, who led the Minnesota delegation in organizing to quash the Wisconsin tribes' effort. Four of the tribes gave $56,000 to Democrats in 1995 and $225,000 in 1996. Those tribes also had donated heavily to Wellstone and Oberstar.

== Outcome ==
The Independent Counsel eventually did not find prosecutable evidence of wrongdoing, though did note major irregularities in the decision process. In 2000 the Interior Department chose not to continue fighting a lawsuit by the tribes in the Hudson partnership and reversed its earlier denial of the casino application. However, the measure eventually failed to win needed approval by then-Wisconsin governor Scott McCallum.
