= James Hamm =

American murderer

James Hamm (born c. 1947/1948) is a criminal justice consultant and convicted murderer. He was convicted for the drug-related murder of Willard Morley in 1974 and was sentenced to life in prison without the possibility of parole for 25 years. His co-defendant, Garland Wells, was convicted of killing another man (Zane Staples) in the same incident. Morley and Staples were in Arizona for the purpose of purchasing drugs to sell to college students in Kansas. Staples was AWOL from the U.S. Army at the time of the 1974 offense. Both defendants (Hamm/Wells) were sentenced to prison for 25 years to life.

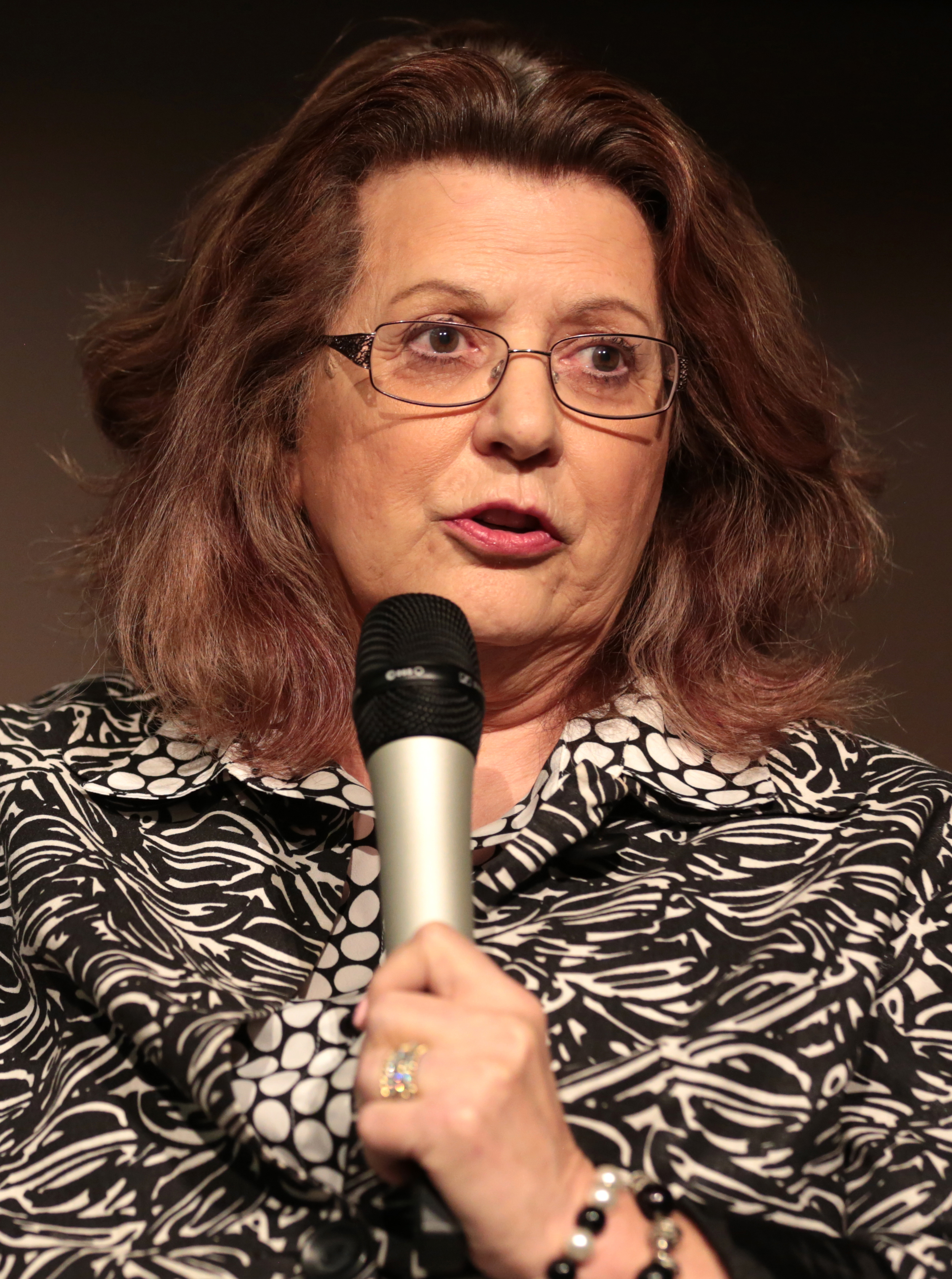
Donna Leone Hamm

While in prison, Hamm earned a summa cum laude degree from Northern Arizona University in applied sociology with an extended major in corrections. In 1981, he met Donna Leone while she was touring the prison; Leone was a lower court judge. They married in 1987.

Hamm applied for and was granted a commutation of sentence by then-governor Rose Mofford, which reduced his prison sentence to 16 years to life (1989). She later rescinded the commutation due to negative publicity against her, but the commutation was judicially restored. A finding was made by the court that Mofford's decision to rescind was "politically motivated."

In 1992, Hamm was paroled. He had taken the LSAT exam for law school while in prison, scoring in the 96 percentile. Once released, he attended Sandra Day O'Connor College of Law, where he graduated with honors in 1997. Hamm passed the bar exam, but his application seeking admission to the Arizona bar was rejected by the Arizona Supreme Court in In the Matter of Hamm, 123 P.3d 652 Hamm works as a private criminal justice consultant for several attorneys in the Phoenix, Arizona area. He also is qualified in the courts as an expert on prison policy and procedure, time computations and performs volunteer work for Middle Ground Prison Reform, a non-profit agency formed by Donna Leone in 1983.
