= Jack LaSota =

American lawyer

20th Attorney General of Arizona
- In office 1977–1979
- Governor: Wesley Bolin
- Preceded by: Bruce Babbitt
- Succeeded by: Robert K. Corbin

Personal details
- Party: Democratic

John A. LaSota is a former Arizona Attorney General (1977–1978). LaSota also served as Bruce Babbitt's Chief of Staff when the former was governor of Arizona. He is a lobbyist for the firm LaSota & Peters, P.L.C.

== Career ==
LaSota is a member of the Arizona State Bar. He has drafted statutes, including telephonic search warrant and electronic eavesdropping laws, many of which are still on the books. He spent three years at the Arizona State University College of Law as a faculty member and assistant dean, during which tenure his principal role was to draft and circulate nationwide to over 500 agencies pioneering Model Rules for Law Enforcement.

== Attorney General ==
After Bruce Babbitt succeeded Wesley Bolin as governor, he appointed LaSota to replace him as Attorney General. Members of the Arizona senate, led by Senate President Ed Sawyer, sued LaSota arguing he was statutorily barred from serving. The senators alleged LaSota was barred by A.R.S. 41-191, which stated that "(t)he attorney general shall have been for not less than five years immediately preceding the date of taking office a practicing attorney before the supreme court of the state." While LaSota was employed at the Arizona State University School of Law his bar membership lapsed to retired status and, as a retired lawyer, he could not practice law or hold himself out as eligible to do so. The court voided the statute.

== Footnotes ==
Legal offices
Preceded by Bruce Babbitt	Attorney General of Arizona; 1978–1979	Succeeded by Robert K. Corbin
