= Wesley Bolin =

American politician (1909–1978)

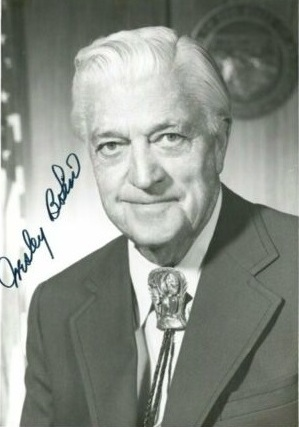

15th Governor of Arizona
- In office October 20, 1977 – March 4, 1978
- Preceded by: Raúl H. Castro
- Succeeded by: Bruce Babbitt

12th Secretary of State of Arizona
- In office January 3, 1949 – October 20, 1977
- Governor: Dan Edward Garvey; John Howard Pyle; Ernest McFarland; Paul Fannin; Samuel Pearson Goddard, Jr. Jack Williams; Raúl H. Castro
- Preceded by: Curtis M. Williams
- Succeeded by: Rose Mofford

Personal details
- Born: Harvey Wesley Bolin; July 1, 1909 near Butler, Missouri, U.S.
- Died: March 4, 1978 (aged 68) Phoenix, Arizona, U.S.
- Party: Democratic
- Education: Phoenix College; La Salle Extension University
- Profession: Businessman

Harvey Wesley Bolin (July 1, 1909 – March 4, 1978) was an American Democratic Party politician who served as the 15th governor of Arizona between 1977 and 1978. His five months in office mark the shortest term in office for any Arizona governor. Prior to ascending to the Governorship, Bolin was the longest serving Secretary of State of Arizona, serving 28 years from 1949 until he succeeded to the governorship in 1977 following the resignation of his predecessor.

== Life and death ==
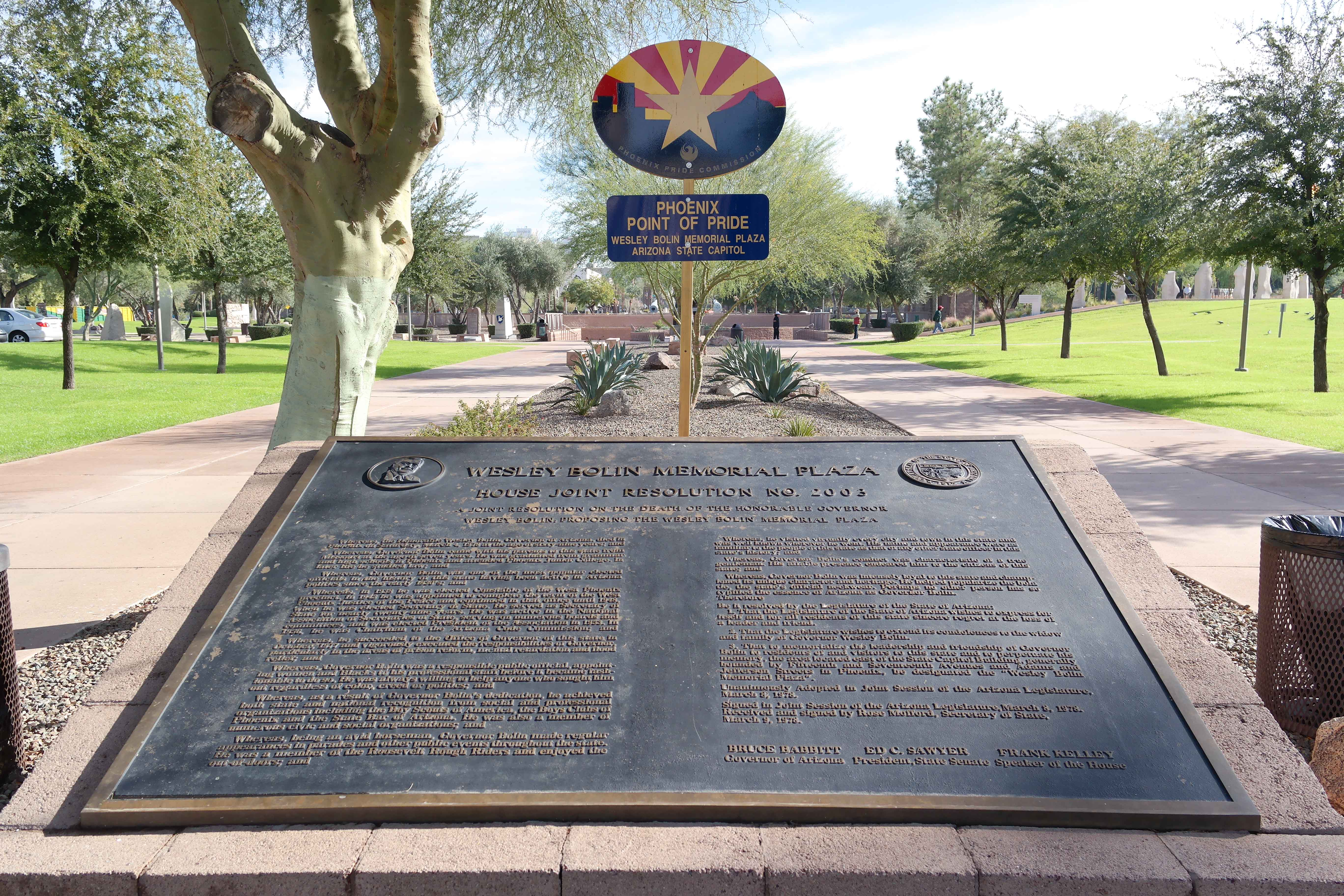
A view of the Wesley Bolin Memorial Plaza

Harvey Wesley Bolin was born on a farm near Butler, Missouri, a son of Doc Strother Bolin (1878–1946) and Margaret (Combs) Bolin (1885–1966). His family moved to Arizona when he was six, and Bolin was raised and educated in Phoenix. He attended Isaac Elementary School, graduated from Phoenix Union High School, and attended Phoenix College. Bolin became active in the dry cleaning business and completed an LL.B. degree from La Salle Extension University.

Active in politics as a Democrat, Bolin was elected constable of West Phoenix Precinct in 1938. From 1943 until 1948, he was the West Phoenix Precinct's justice of the peace. While serving as a justice, Bolin was one of the organizers of the Arizona Justices of the Peace and Constables Association.

Bolin served as Arizona's secretary of state for a total of 28 years, 9 months, 17 days (or 10,518 days), and remains the longest-serving secretary of state in Arizona history. He was first elected to the state's second highest-post in 1948 and was re-elected every two years between 1950 and 1968, when executive offices had two-year terms, and twice more in 1970 and 1974, when four-year terms began. Only in his last three runs did he encounter significant challenges, culminating in him almost losing his thirteenth campaign in 1974.

He succeeded to the governorship in October 1977 after the previous governor, Raúl H. Castro, was named ambassador to Argentina by President Jimmy Carter. Under the Arizona Constitution, until the lieutenant governor constitutional amendment introduced in 2022, the secretary of state was first in line to fill a vacancy in the governorship as long as he or she had been elected to that position. Bolin was the second secretary of state to succeed to the Arizona governorship, after Dan Edward Garvey in 1948. In 1977, the State Bar of Arizona presented Bolin its first Liberty Bell Award in recognition of his responsibility as keeper of the laws.

Bolin died at home of a heart attack on March 4, 1978. He was cremated and his ashes were scattered at multiple sites, one in each of Arizona's 14 counties.

After Bolin's death, Bruce Babbitt succeeded to the governorship. Rose Mofford had been appointed by Bolin to finish his term as secretary of state, but was ineligible to succeed him as governor because she had not been elected to her office. Babbitt, then serving as state Attorney General, was next in the line of succession and had been elected to his post. He finished the remaining nine months of the term, then was elected to two terms as governor in his own right.

The Wesley Bolin Memorial Plaza near the capitol in Phoenix, Arizona, was named after him, and has been designated as a Phoenix Point of Pride.

Political offices
Preceded by Curtis Williams	Secretary of State of Arizona; January 3, 1949 – October 20, 1977	Succeeded by Rose Perica Mofford
Preceded by Raúl H. Castro	Governor of Arizona; October 20, 1977 – March 4, 1978	Succeeded by Bruce Babbitt
