= Grant Woods (attorney) =

23rd Attorney General of Arizona (1954–2021)

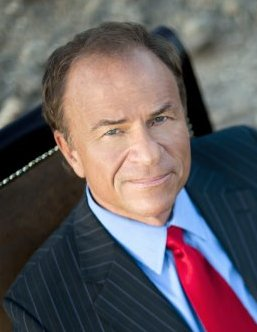
- Woods at Camelback Mountain in 2010

22nd Attorney General of Arizona
- In office January 7, 1991 – January 4, 1999
- Governor: Fife Symington; Jane Dee Hull
- Preceded by: Robert K. Corbin
- Succeeded by: Janet Napolitano

Personal details
- Born: May 19, 1954 Elk City, Oklahoma, U.S.
- Died: October 23, 2021 (aged 67)
- Party: Republican (before 2018); Democratic (2018–2021)
- Spouse(s): Barbara Ross; Marlene Galán
- Children: 5
- Education: Occidental College (BA); Arizona State University, Tempe (JD)

J. Grant Woods (May 19, 1954 – October 23, 2021) was an American attorney and politician who served as Attorney General of Arizona from 1991 until 1999. Woods was a moderate-to-liberal Republican who served as John McCain's chief of staff when he was a congressman. He endorsed Hillary Clinton in the 2016 United States presidential election and Joe Biden in the 2020 United States presidential election.

== Background and early career ==
Grant Woods was the son of Joe Woods, a developer in the Mesa, Arizona, area.

Woods attended the Arizona State University College of Law (later the Sandra Day O'Connor College of Law), graduating in 1979.

== Career ==
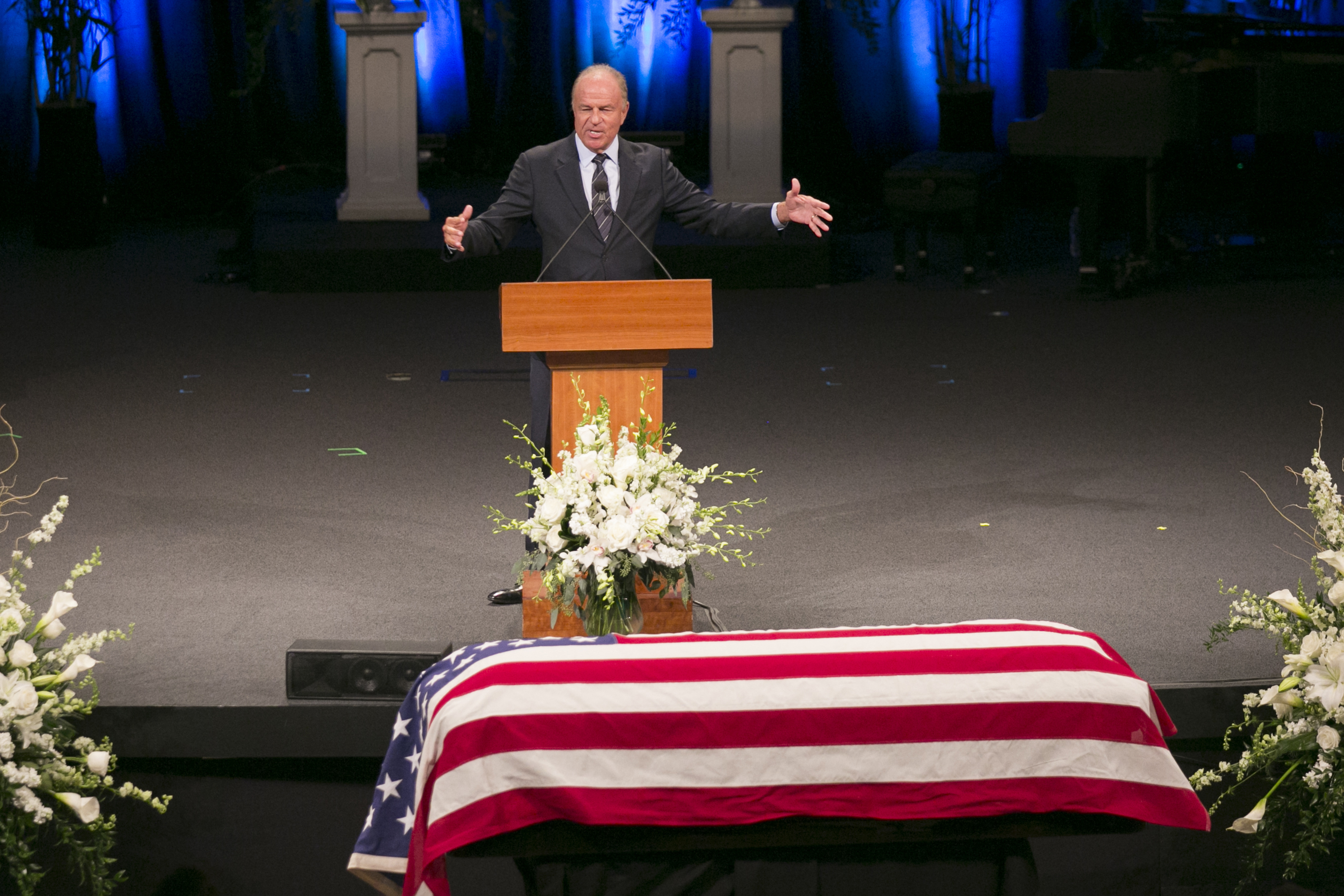
Woods pays tribute to John McCain.

Woods, considered a moderate-to-liberal Republican, was the Arizona Attorney General from 1991 to 1999. In the 1980s, he was the first congressional chief of staff for the late U.S. Sen. John McCain, R-Ariz., and was a longtime friend and confidant of McCain's.

During the 2016 United States presidential election, he endorsed the Democratic candidate, Hillary Clinton. Regarding the two presidential candidates, he wrote, "Hillary Clinton is one of the most qualified nominees to ever run for president. Donald Trump is the least qualified ever. The stakes are too high to stand on the sideline. I stand with Hillary Clinton for president."

Woods delivered a eulogy at Senator McCain's funeral in 2018. Woods recounted stories of his time with McCain and wrote that their friendship was "a little bit harrowing, a little bit wild ... but a lot of fun. And the greatest honor of my life".

Jon Kyl was appointed to succeed McCain, but said he would not run for re-election. He resigned in December 2018 and Governor Doug Ducey appointed Martha McSally to fill the remainder of the term. A special election would be held in 2020. Woods considered running for the seat as a Democrat; however, he announced on February 8, 2019, that he would not seek election to McCain's former senate seat in 2020 to avoid campaigning against other Democrats, stating that "Democrats are not the problem." He supported Joe Biden in the 2020 Democratic Party presidential primaries and the 2020 United States presidential election, writing "The future of our country is at stake... If you think the last two and a half years have been bad, try eight years of Donald Trump. My message to Democrats is, 'Look we can have a nice primary, that's fine, but why don't we nominate somebody who can actually win?' That's Joe Biden."

In June 2021, Woods was fired from the law firm Gallagher & Kennedy (G&K), after he sent out a tweet criticizing Arizona Diamondbacks owner Ken Kendrick. G&K is the legal representative for the Diamondbacks.

== Personal life ==
Woods was married to the former Marlene Galán, and had five children. He died from a heart attack on October 23, 2021, at age 67. Woods' first wife, Barbara Ross, is the mother of his two oldest children.

== Electoral history ==
1990 Arizona Attorney General election
Party	Candidate	Votes	%	±%
Republican	Grant Woods	603,534	58.5	
Democratic	Georgia Staton	426,726	41.4	
Libertarian	Bernie Lumbert (write-in)	337	.01	
Republican hold		Swing		

1994 Arizona Attorney General election
Party	Candidate	Votes	%	±%
Republican	Grant Woods (incumbent)	838,265	80.2	
Libertarian	John E. Karow	207,710	19.8	
Republican hold		Swing		

Legal offices
Preceded by Robert K. Corbin	Attorney General of Arizona; 1991–1999	Succeeded by Janet Napolitano
