= Bruce Babbitt =

American lawyer and politician (born 1938)

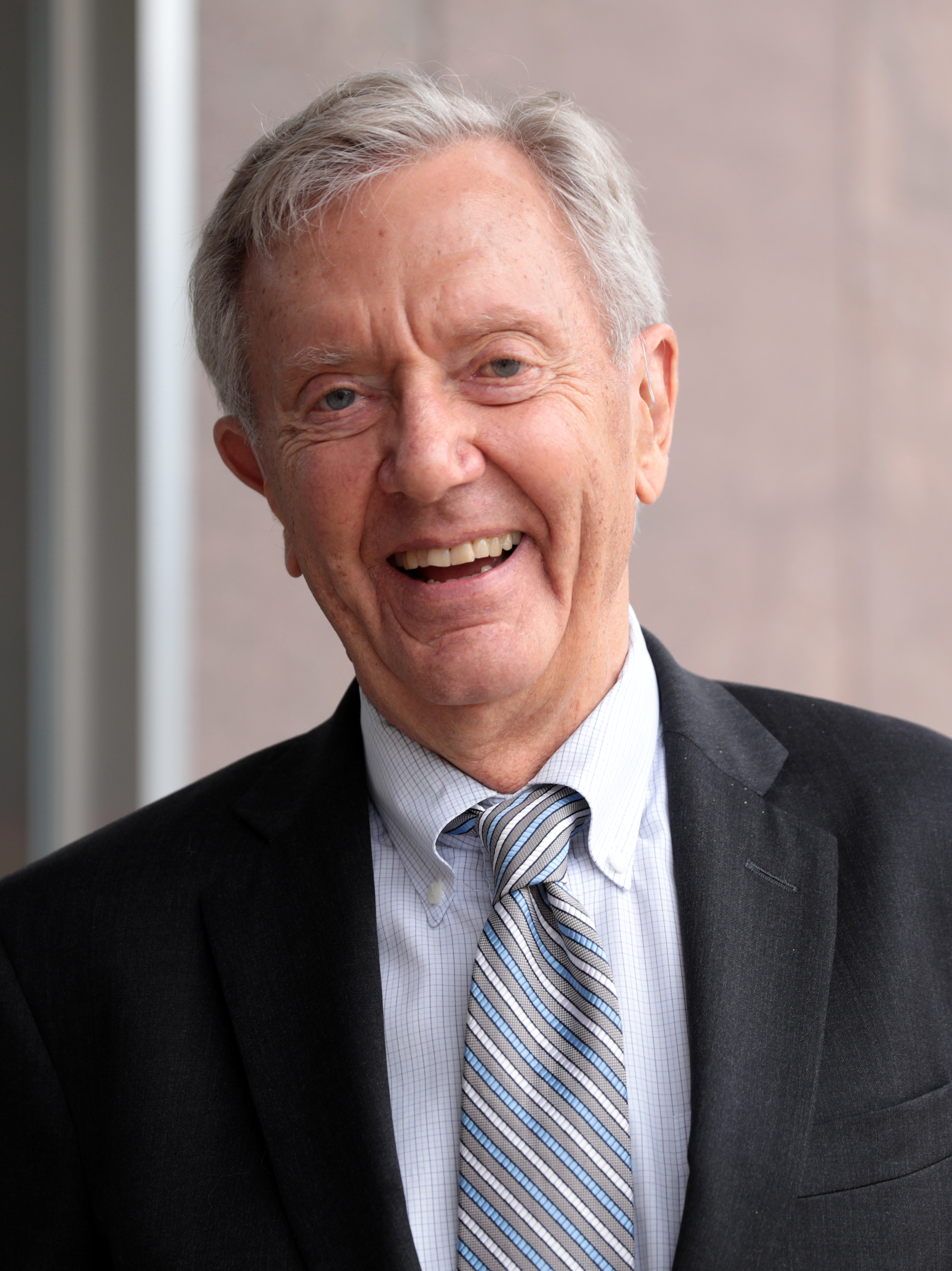
- Babbitt in 2019

47th United States Secretary of the Interior
- In office January 22, 1993 – January 19, 2001
- President: Bill Clinton
- Preceded by: Manuel Lujan
- Succeeded by: Gale Norton

16th Governor of Arizona
- In office March 4, 1978 – January 5, 1987
- Preceded by: Wesley Bolin
- Succeeded by: Evan Mecham

19th Attorney General of Arizona
- In office January 6, 1975 – March 4, 1978
- Governor: Raúl Castro; Wesley Bolin
- Preceded by: N. Warner Lee
- Succeeded by: Jack LaSota

Personal details
- Born: Bruce Edward Babbitt; June 27, 1938 (age 88) Los Angeles, California, U.S.
- Party: Democratic
- Spouse: Hattie Coons (m. 1968)
- Children: 2
- Education: University of Notre Dame (BS); Newcastle University (MSc); Harvard University (JD)

Bruce Edward Babbitt (born June 27, 1938) is an American attorney and politician who served as the 47th United States secretary of the interior from 1993 to 2001 under President Bill Clinton. He previously served as the 16th governor of Arizona from 1978 to 1987 and was a candidate for President of the United States in the 1988 Democratic primaries.

He won election as Arizona attorney general after graduating from Harvard Law School. He became Governor of Arizona after the death of his predecessor, Wesley Bolin. Babbitt won election to a full term in 1978 and won re-election in 1982. He focused on tax reform, health care, and water management. He helped found the Democratic Leadership Council and sought the 1988 Democratic presidential nomination, but dropped out of the race after the first set of primaries.

From 1988 to 1992, Babbitt served as head of the League of Conservation Voters. Clinton strongly considered nominating Babbitt to the Supreme Court after vacancies arose in 1993 and 1994. After leaving public office in 2001, Babbitt became an attorney with Latham & Watkins.

== Personal life ==
Babbitt was born on June 27, 1938, in Los Angeles, California, into a prominent Roman Catholic family from Flagstaff, Arizona, the son of Frances B. (Perry) and Paul James Babbitt Sr. His family owned a department store in Flagstaff, a ranch in northern Arizona, and multiple Indian trading posts. He graduated from the University of Notre Dame, attended Newcastle University in the United Kingdom on a Marshall Scholarship, and then received his J.D. degree at Harvard Law School.

He married Harriet Coons (known as Hattie) in 1968. She has worked as an attorney in Arizona and Washington, D.C., and served as United States Ambassador to the Organization of American States from 1993 to 1997, and as Deputy Administrator of the United States Agency for International Development from 1997 to 2001 during the Clinton Administration.

As attorney for the Scottsdale Daily Progress newspaper, Babbitt worked with publisher Jonathan Marshall in crafting legislation that became Arizona's "open meeting law."

== Political career ==
=== Arizona ===
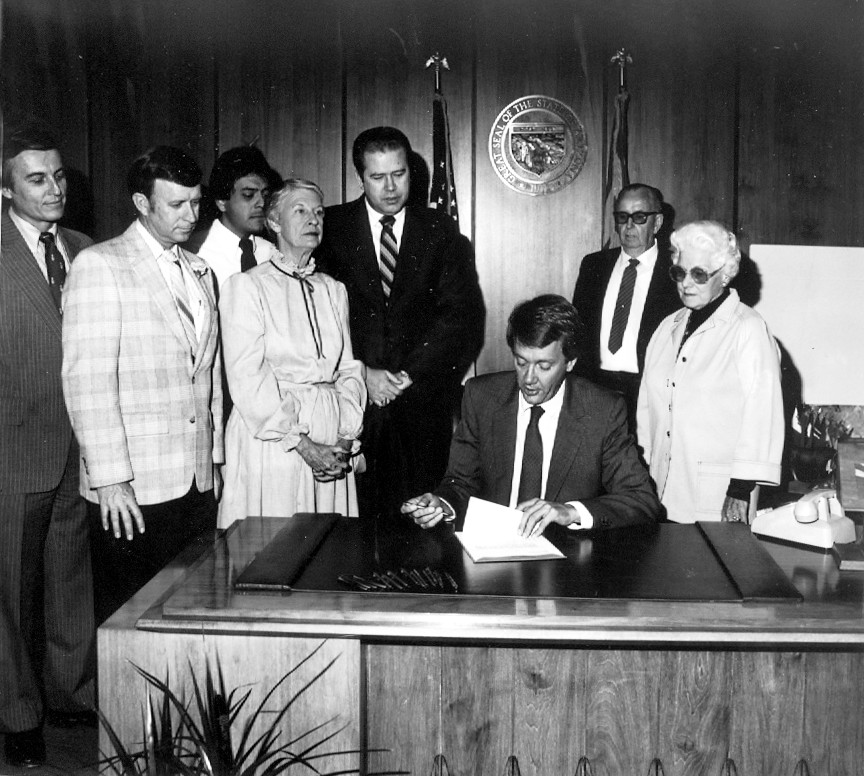
Babbitt signing legislation in the Governor's Office in Phoenix, Arizona.

In the state election of November 1974, Babbitt overcame Republican incumbent N. Warner Lee to become Attorney General of Arizona.

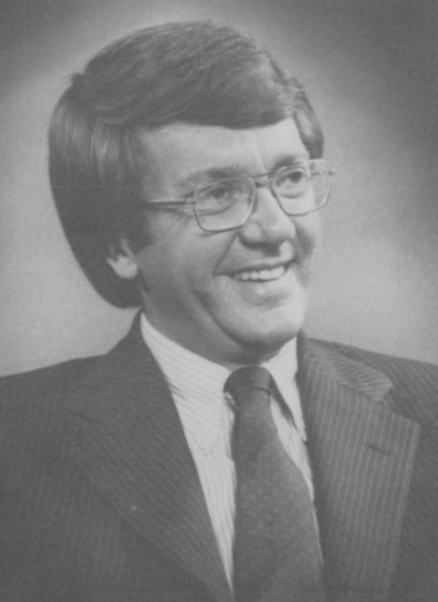
Babbitt as governor.

He succeeded Wesley Bolin as governor when Bolin died in office on March 4, 1978. Arizona does not have a lieutenant governor; the Arizona Secretary of State, if holding office by election, stands first in line in case the governor vacates his or her post. However, Rose Mofford, then secretary of state, had been appointed to her post and thus was not eligible to become governor according to the Arizona state constitution. Babbitt, as attorney general, was next in the line of succession, and thus served the balance of the term to which Raúl Héctor Castro had originally been elected in 1974. Babbitt was elected for a full four-year term later in 1978, and again in 1982. He did not run for a third full term in 1986.

In 1982, Babbitt intervened in negotiations between the Cochise County sheriff and leaders of the Christ Miracle Healing Church and Center over the release of church members whom the church was hiding from facing charges for assault. The church, which had been implicated in bomb-making, would play a central role in the Miracle Valley shootout later that year. In 1983, Babbitt sent the Arizona National Guard to the strike against the Phelps Dodge mining company in Morenci, Arizona.

With the retirement of Republican Barry Goldwater from the U.S. Senate in 1986, many in Arizona expected Babbitt to oppose Representative John McCain for the seat. In a surprise press conference in 1985, Babbitt instead announced he would forgo the Senate race to concentrate on a White House bid in 1988.

=== National work ===
In 1979, Babbitt was appointed by President Jimmy Carter to serve as a commissioner on the President's Commission on the Accident at Three Mile Island, a six-month investigation of the March 1979 accident at a commercial nuclear power plant at Middletown, Pennsylvania. Babbitt spoke at the 1980 Democratic National Convention, which nominated incumbent Jimmy Carter as the Democratic candidate for president.

A founding member of the Democratic Leadership Council and the chairman of the Democratic Governors Association in 1985, Babbitt sought the Democratic Party's 1988 nomination for President of the United States. Among his proposals was a national sales tax to remedy the then-record budget deficits piled up during the several past administrations. He enjoyed positive press attention (called a "boomlet" in USA Today), but after finishing out of the top tier of candidates in the Iowa caucuses and New Hampshire primary, he dropped out of the race. In an intentional reference to Richard Nixon (who said after losing the California governorship in the 1962 election that the press "won't have [me] to kick around anymore"), Babbitt joked in his last campaign press conference that the media "won't have Bruce Babbitt to puff up anymore." The Washington Post reported that Babbitt dropped this line from the prepared text of his withdrawal speech.

=== Secretary of the Interior ===
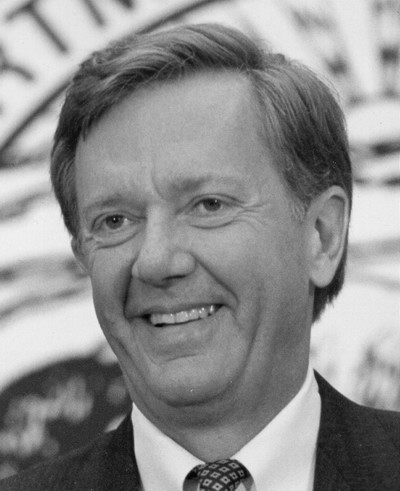
Babbitt as Secretary of the Interior, 1993

After leading the League of Conservation Voters, Babbitt served for eight years, 1993–2001, as the Secretary of the Interior during the Presidency of Bill Clinton. According to John D. Leshy:

His most remembered legacies will likely be his advocacy of environmental restoration, his efforts to safeguard and build support for the ESA (the Endangered Species Act of 1973) and the biodiversity that it helps protect, and the public land conservation measures that flowered on his watch.

Babbitt worked to protect scenic and historic areas of America's federal public lands. In 2000 Babbitt created the National Landscape Conservation System, a collection of 15 U.S. National Monuments and 14 National Conservation Areas to be managed by the Bureau of Land Management in such a way as to keep them "healthy, open, and wild."

A major issue involved low fees charged ranchers who grazed cattle on public lands. The "animal unit month" (AUM) fee was only $1.35 and was far below the 1983 market value. The argument was that the federal government in effect was subsidizing ranchers, with a few major corporations controlling millions of acres of grazing land. Babbitt tried to rally environmentalists and raise fees, but senators from Western states successfully blocked his proposals.

In 1993, Babbitt was seriously considered by President Clinton to replace retiring United States Supreme Court Justice Byron White. Due to his lead on environmental issues, however, Clinton nominated Ruth Bader Ginsburg instead. Clinton again considered Babbitt for the high court in 1994 when Harry Blackmun announced his retirement. Babbitt was passed over again, this time in favor of Stephen Breyer, due to Breyer's immense support in the U.S. Senate, primarily because he was close to Sen. Ted Kennedy.

In 1998 Babbitt was the subject of a federal grand jury investigation into whether he had lied to Congress about having denied an Indian casino license in Wisconsin in return for political donations. The controversy has been called Wampumgate. Babbitt was cleared of wrongdoing in the special prosecutor's final report on the investigation the following year.

== Post-political life ==
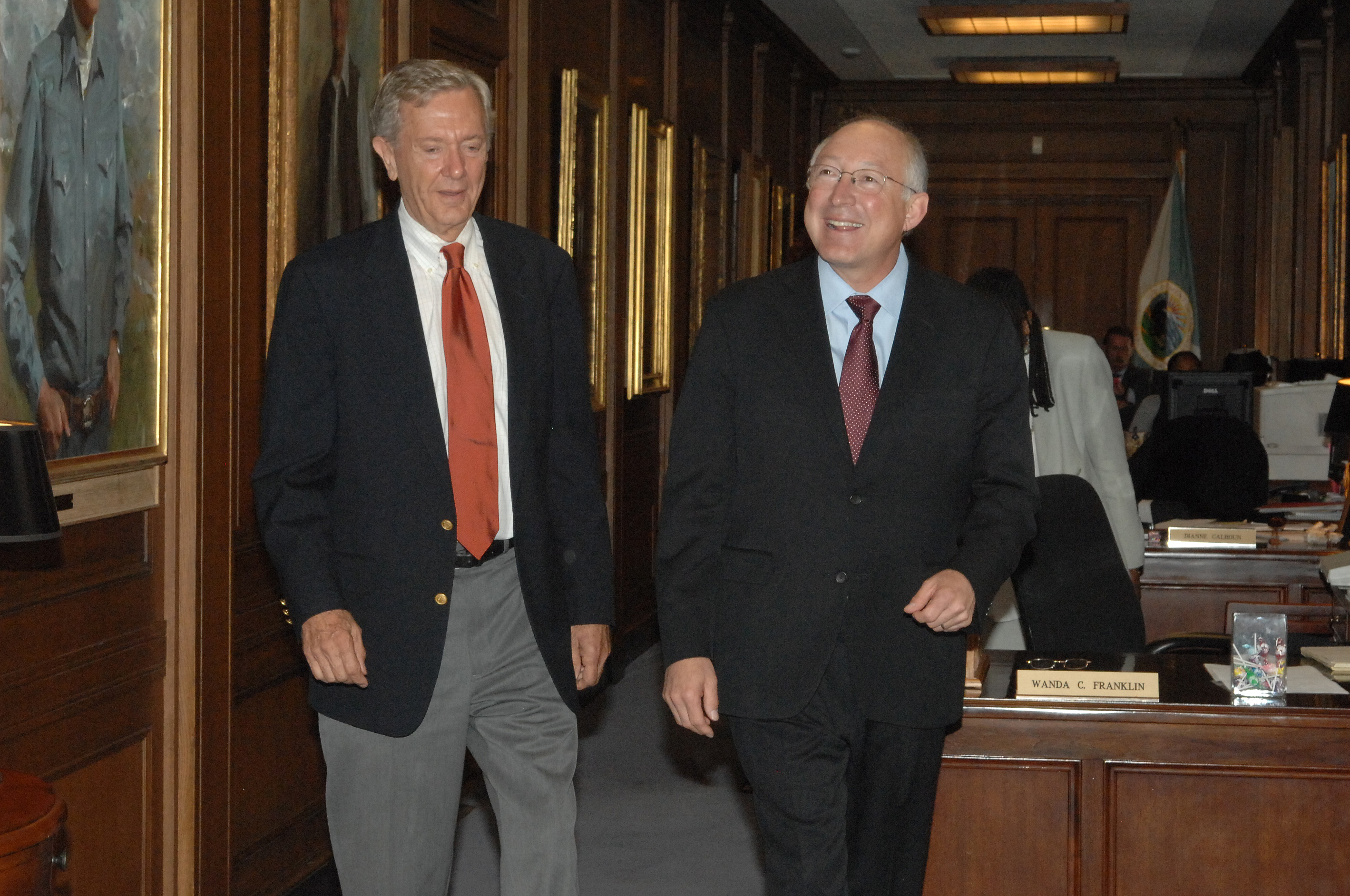
Babbitt with then–Secretary of the Interior Ken Salazar at the department's headquarters in Washington, D.C.

Babbitt took a job as chief counsel of the environmental litigation department of Latham & Watkins, an international law firm, after leaving the Department of the Interior. During his time at Latham & Watkins, Babbitt offended many environmentalists by taking on two clients trying to build large developments near the coastline. Babbitt defended both projects, one on Hearst Corporation land in central California and the other on the Ahmanson Ranch north of Los Angeles.

Babbitt has attracted the ire of some environmentalists and Native American groups for his representation of the Arizona Snowbowl ski resort and its effort to expand the resort and use waste water to make artificial snow.

He serves as trustee of the World Wildlife Fund Secretariat Trustees in the U.S., and was a member of the Council on Foreign Relations until 2012. He has also served on the Board of Directors since 2009 for the Amazon Conservation Association, whose mission is to conserve the biological diversity of the Amazon. Babbitt is also a member of the ReFormers Caucus of Issue One.

== See also ==
- Bill Clinton Supreme Court candidates

Legal offices
| Preceded by N. Warner Lee | Attorney General of Arizona; 1975–1978 | Succeeded by Jack LaSota |
Party political offices
| Preceded by Raúl Castro | Democratic nominee for Governor of Arizona; 1978, 1982 | Succeeded by Carolyn Warner |
| Preceded by Chuck Robb | Chair of the Democratic Governors Association; 1984–1985 | Succeeded by Richard Riley |
Political offices
| Preceded by Wesley Bolin | Governor of Arizona; 1978–1987 | Succeeded by Evan Mecham |
| Preceded by Manuel Lujan | United States Secretary of the Interior; 1993–2001 | Succeeded by Gale Norton |
U.S. order of precedence (ceremonial)
| Preceded by Richard Riley as Former U.S. Cabinet Member | Order of precedence of the United States as Former U.S. Cabinet Member | Succeeded by Mike Espy as Former U.S. Cabinet Member |
