= Arizona Attorney General =

Chief legal officer of Arizona

Attorney General of Arizona
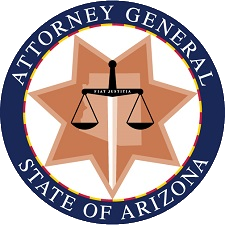
- Seal of the attorney general of Arizona

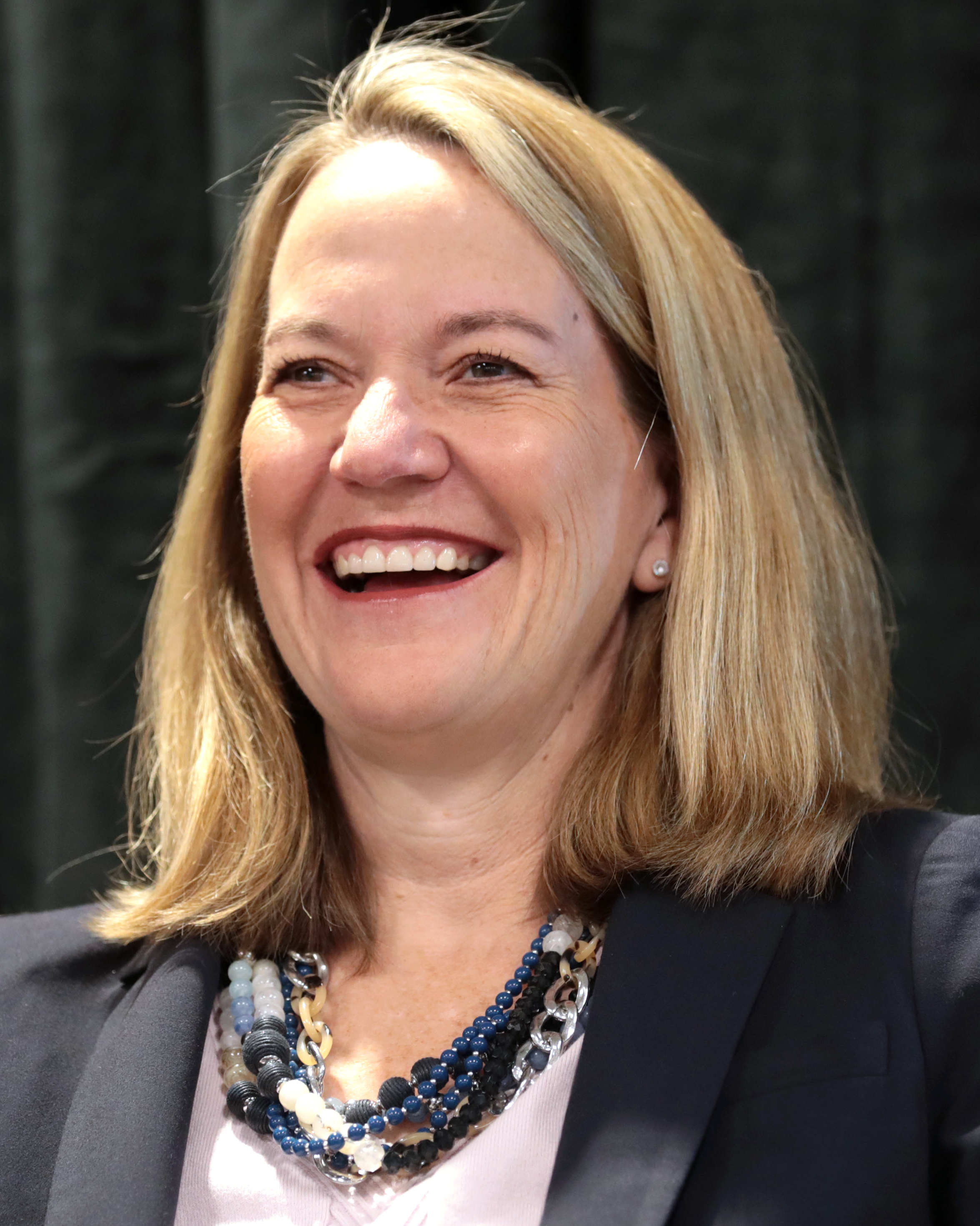
- Incumbent; Kris Mayes since January 2, 2023
- Style: The Honorable
- Residence: Phoenix, Arizona
- Term length: Four years; renewable once consecutively
- Inaugural holder: Coles Bashford
- Formation: 1912
- Succession: Second
- Salary: $90,000
- Website: www.azag.gov

The Arizona attorney general is the chief legal officer of the State of Arizona, in the United States. This state officer is the head of the Arizona Department of Law, more commonly known as the Arizona Attorney General's Office. The state attorney general is a constitutionally-established officer, elected by the people of the state to a four-year term. The state attorney general is second (behind the Secretary of State) in the line of succession to the office of Governor of Arizona.

Headed by the attorney general of Arizona, the Arizona Attorney General's Office is the largest law office in the state, with approximately 400 attorneys and 1,000 employees. As of 2019, the Attorney General's Office is divided into the following divisions:

- Executive Office
- Solicitor General
- Operations
- Child and Family Protection
- State Government Division
- Civil Litigation Division
- Criminal
- Civil Rights

== Qualifications ==
The Arizona Constitution requires all of the officers in the state's executive department, including the attorney general, to be at least 25 years old, a U.S. citizen for ten years and an Arizona resident for five years.

Arizona law further requires the attorney general to have been a "practicing attorney before the supreme court of the state" for at least five years before taking office. However, the Arizona Supreme Court ruled the law unconstitutional during the appointment process of Jack LaSota in 1977; LaSota had not renewed his state bar membership and was therefore not considered a practicing attorney.

== Powers and duties ==
While the state constitution establishes the office of Attorney General, it does not prescribe the powers of the office. Instead, the Arizona Constitution expressly provides that the powers and duties of the state attorney general are to be prescribed by the Arizona State Legislature. In pursuance of this constitutional mandate, the Arizona Legislature has prescribed that, under A.R.S. §41-193(A)(1) – § 41-193(A)(8), the attorney general of Arizona, through the Arizona Department of Law, shall:

1. Prosecute and defend in the state supreme court all proceedings in which the state or an officer thereof is a party ~ A.R.S. § 41-193(A)(1);
2. Under certain conditions, prosecute and defend any proceeding in all other courts of the state, in which the state or an officer thereof is a party or has an interest ~ A.R.S. § 41-193(A)(2);
3. Represent the state in any action in a federal court ~ A.R.S. § 41-193(A)(3);
4. Exercise supervisory powers over county attorneys ~ A.R.S. § 41-193(A)(4);
5. Under certain conditions, assist any county attorney in the discharge of their duties ~ A.R.S. § 41-193(A)(5);
6. Maintain a docket of all proceedings in which the attorney general is required to appear ~ A.R.S. §41-193(A)(6);
7. Issue attorney general opinions on questions of law to state officers and agencies ~ A.R.S. § 41-193(A)(7); and
8. Perform other duties prescribed by law ~ A.R.S. § 41-193(A)(8).

== Arizona Attorneys General ==
=== Arizona Territory ===
Image	Name	Term of Office
	Coles Bashford	1864–1866
	John A. Rush	1866–1867
	Granville Henderson Oury	1869
	J. E. McCaffry	ca. 1872
	Clark Churchill	1884–1887
	Briggs Goodrich	1887–1888
	John A. Rush	1888–1889
	Clark Churchill	1889–1892
	William Herring	1892–1893
	John C. Herndon	1893
	Francis J. Heney	1893–1895
	Thomas D. Satterwhite	1895–1896
	John Frank Wilson	1896–1897
	C. M. Frazier	1898
	Charles F. Ainsworth	1898–1902
	Edmund W. Wells	1902–1904
	Joseph H. Kibbey	1904–1905
	E. S. Clark	1905–1910
	John B. Wright	1910–1912

=== State of Arizona ===
Parties

Democratic (17) Republican (10)

#	Image	Name	Political Party	Term of Office
1		George Purdy Bullard	Democratic	1912–1915
2		Wiley E. Jones	Democratic	1915–1921
3		W. J. Galbraith	Republican	1921–1923
4		John W. Murphy	Democratic	1923–1928
5		K. Berry Peterson	Democratic	1928–1933
6		Arthur T. LaPrade	Democratic	1933–1935
7		John L. Sullivan	Democratic	1935–1937
8		Joe Conway	Democratic	1937–1944
9		John L. Sullivan	Democratic	1944–1948
10		Evo Anton DeConcini	Democratic	1948–1949
11		Fred O. Wilson	Democratic	1949–1953
12		Ross F. Jones	Republican	1953–1955
13		Robert Morrison	Democratic	1955–1959
14		Wade Church	Democratic	1959–1961
15		Robert Pickrell	Republican	1961–1965
16		Darrell F. Smith	Republican	1965–1968
17		Gary K. Nelson	Republican	1969–1974
18		N. Warner Lee	Republican	1974–1975
19		Bruce Babbitt	Democratic	1975–1978
20		Jack LaSota	Democratic	1978–1979
21		Robert K. Corbin	Republican	1979–1991
22		Grant Woods	Republican	1991–1999
23		Janet Napolitano	Democratic	1999–2003
24		Terry Goddard	Democratic	2003–2011
25		Tom Horne	Republican	2011–2015
26		Mark Brnovich	Republican	2015–2023
27		Kris Mayes	Democratic	2023–present
