= Sue Clark-Johnson =

Newspaper journalist and publisher (1948–2015)

Sue Clark-Johnson (1948–2015) was an American professional journalist and newspaper publisher. She is notable for being the first female president of the Gannett Co. Newspaper Division, the largest newspaper publisher in the United States. She held that position from 2005–2008.

== Early life and education ==
Clark-Johnson was born in 1948 in Mount Kisco, New York. She received her Bachelor's degree from Binghamton University.

== Career ==
Clark-Johnson started her journalism career in 1967 as a reporter and later an editor at the Niagara Gazette, a local daily newspaper published by Gannett and based in Niagara Falls, New York. By 1977, she had become the paper's publisher. after being promoted by Al Neuharth. In 1983, she was promoted to publisher of the Press & Sun-Bulletin and in 1984 became the regional vice president for Gannett's East publication division. In 1985, she became the senior group president of Gannett's West region. During that time, she also served as publisher of the Reno Gazette-Journal, a daily newspaper based in Reno, Nevada.

In 2005, Clark-Johnson was named president of Gannett's Newspaper Division, succeeding Gary Watson. This made her the first woman to hold the top position since Gannett's founding in 1906. In this role she was in favor of promoting classified ads in newspapers relative to other, on-line, venues, she worked to transition the Gannett newspapers to an online presence, and generally helped move the Gannett newspapers as the industry changed over time.

Clark-Johnson held the position of president of the newspaper division until she retired from Gannett in 2008. From 2009–2013, she served as the executive director of the Morrison Institute for Public Policy at Arizona State University in Phoenix, Arizona. In 2010, she additionally began serving as a professor of practice at ASU's Walter Cronkite School of Journalism and Mass Communication, a position she held until her death in 2015.

== Death and legacy ==
Clark-Johnson died on January 28, 2015, at a hospital in Scottsdale, Arizona after a short illness.

In 2017, Arizona State University, supported by an endowment from Clark-Johnson's husband, Brooks Johnson, created the Sue Clark-Johnson Professorship in Media Innovation and Leadership in her name and awarded the inaugural professorship to former Arizona Republic publisher and president Mi-Ai Parrish. Arizone State University's president, Michael M. Crow, stated that the professorship was designed to "carry on Sue's values and vision and preserve her extraordinary legacy". In a statement announcing the professorship, the Cronkite school said that as a Sue Clark-Johnson Professor, Parrish will "teach, write, speak and collaborate on how to preserve and grow a robust free press in the digital age".
