= Mapúa Institute of Technology at Laguna =

Private college in Laguna, Philippines

- Mapúa Malayan Colleges Laguna
- Established: 2007
- President: Dodjie S. Maestrecampo, Ph.D.
- Dean: Engr. Jesuniño R. Aquino
- Location: Cabuyao, Laguna, Philippines; 14°14′39″N 121°06′44″E
- Website: www.mcl.edu.ph

- Location in Laguna Location in Luzon Location in the Philippines

The Mapúa Institute of Technology at Laguna (MITL) is the flagship college of the Mapúa Malayan Colleges Laguna. The college is under the Mapúa School of Engineering in the Philippines.

MITL is among the three pioneer colleges under Mapúa MCL. It offers architecture and seven engineering programs.

== Degree Programs ==
MITL logo from 2006 to 2013

MITL offers the following degree programs:

- Bachelor of Science in Architecture
- Bachelor of Science in Chemical Engineering
- Bachelor of Science in Civil Engineering
- Bachelor of Science in Computer Engineering
- Bachelor of Science in Electrical Engineering
- Bachelor of Science in Electronics Engineering
- Bachelor of Science in Industrial Engineering
- Bachelor of Science in Mechanical Engineering

== Cardinal Cup ==
In 9–11 November 2011, the MITL held its first MITL week which signified the start of a tradition that will challenge the seven engineering programs to compete for the Cardinal Cup.

Year	Program of the Year
2013	Mechanical Engineering
2012	Electronics Engineering
2011	Mechanical Engineering
