= Kevin Desouza =

Indian American academic (born 1979)

Kevin C. Desouza
- Born: 1979 (age 46–47); Mumbai, Maharashtra
- Education: University of Illinois at Chicago, Illinois Institute of Technology
- Known for: Studies of Innovation and Knowledge Management Systems; Public Administration and Strategic Information Systems; Public Sector Networks and Innovation
- Scientific career
- Fields: Information Systems; Public Administration; Knowledge Management
- Workplaces: Arizona State University

Kevin C. Desouza (born 1979) is an Indian American academic. He is an ASU Foundation professor in the School of Public Affairs at Arizona State University and is a Nonresident Senior Fellow at the Brookings Institution. From 2012 to 2016 he served as Associate Dean for Research at the Watts College of Public Service & Community Solutions.

== Biography ==
Born in Bombay (now Mumbai), Maharashtra, India he grew up in Doha, Qatar where he completed his primary and secondary education. He attended the University of Illinois Chicago in 1996 to study accounting and information & decision sciences, graduating in 2000. He then completed his MBA from the IIT Stuart School of Business and received his Ph.D. from the University of Illinois at Chicago in 2006.

Prior to joining Arizona State University, he directed the Metropolitan Institute at the Virginia Tech College of Architecture and Urban Studies and served as associate professor at the Center for Public Administration and Policy within the School of Public and International Affairs at Virginia Tech. From 2005 to 2011, he was on the faculty at the University of Washington Information School and held adjunct appointments in the university's College of Engineering and at the Daniel J. Evans School of Public Affairs.

While at the University of Washington, he was an affiliate faculty member of the Center for American Politics and Public Policy and holds a visiting professorship at the University of Ljubljana Faculty of Economics. He has held visiting positions at the Centre for International Studies at the London School of Economics, the University of the Witwatersrand, the Montpellier Business School and Accenture Institute for High Business Performance.

== Work ==
Desouza has authored, co-authored, and/or edited nine books, and his research has been featured more than 125 articles in practitioner and academic journals. His research has also been featured by a number of publications such as MIT Sloan Management Review, Harvard Business Review, Bloomberg Businessweek, and Computerworld, among others. He also regularly contributes to practitioner magazines such as the Business Information Review.

Desouza has advised, briefed, and/or consulted for major international corporations, non-governmental organizations, and public agencies on strategic management issues ranging from management of information systems, to knowledge management, competitive intelligence, government intelligence operations, and crisis management.

== Selected publications ==
- Desouza, Kevin. Agile Information Systems. Routledge, 2006.
- Desouza, Kevin C. "Barriers to effective use of knowledge management systems in software engineering." Communications of the ACM 46.1 (2003): 99–101.
- Desouza, Kevin C. "Facilitating tacit knowledge exchange." Communications of the ACM 46.6 (2003): 8588.
- Desouza, Kevin C. "Strategic contributions of game rooms to knowledge management: some preliminary insights." Information & Management 41.1 (2003): 63–74.
- Desouza, Kevin C., and Yukika Awazu. "Knowledge management at SMEs: five peculiarities." Journal of knowledge management 10.1 (2006): 32–43.
- Evaristo, J. Roberto, et al. "A dimensional analysis of geographically distributed project teams: a case study." Journal of Engineering and technology Management 21.3 (2004): 175–189.
- Desouza, Kevin C., Yukika Awazu, and Peter Baloh. "Managing knowledge in global software development efforts: Issues and practices." IEEE software 23.5 (2006): 30–37.
- Desouza, Kevin C., and J. Roberto Evaristo. "Project management offices: A case of knowledge-based archetypes." International Journal of Information Management 26.5 (2006): 414–423.
