= Rick Shangraw =

US businessman

R.F. "Rick" Shangraw Jr.

President of Cintana Education

Personal details
- Born: August 17, 1959 (age 67) Baltimore, Maryland
- Spouse: Mary Shangraw
- Education: Dickinson College; Syracuse University
- Profession: President, Cintana Education
- Website: Cintana Education

R.F. “Rick” Shangraw Jr. (born August 17, 1959) was named president of Cintana Education on May 1, 2020. Previously, he was chief executive officer of ASU Enterprise Partners from 2016 to 2019. He was chief executive officer of the ASU Foundation for A New American University from 2011 to July 1, 2017, after being appointed to the position by the Arizona State University Foundation board of directors on Oct. 31, 2011 succeeding Johnnie Ray. Previously, Shangraw worked in both the private and public sectors after beginning his career as an assistant professor at Syracuse University.

== Biography ==
Born and raised in Baltimore, Maryland, Rick Shangraw is the oldest of three children, with a brother and sister. An interest in academia, research and innovation led Shangraw to follow in the footsteps of his father, pharmaceuticals researcher Ralph F. Shangraw. Shangraw holds a Bachelor of Arts degree in political science from Dickinson College in Pennsylvania, and was the first person to receive a certificate in environmental studies from that institution. Shangraw also earned a master's degree in public administration from Syracuse University, and a Ph.D. from Syracuse with a specialization in technology, information policy and organization design. Prior to working in the private sector, Shangraw served as an assistant professor at Syracuse.

=== Sustainability ===
An affinity for sustainability led Shangraw in 1999 to found CARL — the R.F. Shangraw Jr. Community Aquatic Research Laboratory in the Environmental Studies department of his undergraduate alma mater, Dickinson College. CARL is a key component of Dickinson's Alliance for Aquatic Resource Monitoring, allowing students and staff to perform watershed tests and experiments. At Arizona State University, Shangraw was director of the Global Institute of Sustainability and was instrumental in establishing a socially responsible investment fund in the ASU Foundation.

=== Higher education ===
Shangraw returned to higher education, becoming an executive leader at Arizona State University in 2004. Shangraw established and led the university's Decision Theater from 2005 to 2007. He was ASU vice president for research and economic affairs until 2010, when he was chosen by ASU President Michael Crow as director of the Global Institute of Sustainability (now the Julie Ann Wrigley Global Institute of Sustainability) in the ASU School of Sustainability, and as senior vice president of the university's Office of Knowledge Enterprise Development. As director of GIOS, Shangraw oversaw the institute's research, education and problem-solving initiatives, with a focus on urban environments. At OKED, Shangraw established ASU as one of the fastest-growing research enterprises in the country, ranking in the top 20 of all research universities without a medical school.

In addition to his role as head of the ASU Foundation, Shangraw was CEO of ASURE, the university's defense and security affiliate.

Shangraw also currently holds a professor of practice appointment in the ASU Watts College of Public Service & Community Solutions.

=== Professional affiliations ===
Shangraw's has been on the board of directors of:

- The McCain Institute for International Leadership
- InStride
- Grand Canyon Council, Boy Scouts of America

== CEO of Project Performance Corporation ==
In 1988, Shangraw left his teaching post at Syracuse University for the private sector, applying technology policy and management to improve the outcomes of large-scale government and commercial projects. During the 14 years that followed he founded and led Project Performance Corporation, a Washington, D.C.-based research and technology consulting firm specializing in environmental, energy and information management. During his tenure, PPC was recognized among the Inc. 500 as one of the fastest-growing privately held businesses in the U.S. PPC grossed $32 million in Shangraw's final year as CEO.

== CEO of the ASU Foundation for A New American University ==
From 2011 to 2017, Shangraw was president and chief executive officer of the ASU Foundation for A New American University, a private, 501(c)(3) nonprofit organization that acquires and invests resources to support Arizona State University. In 2008, reflecting ASU President Michael Crow's concept of ASU as a "New American University", the foundation's board of directors changed the name to the ASU Foundation for A New American University. When he became CEO in 2011, Shangraw expanded the role of the foundation to better support the concept of the New American University.

Prior to his tenure the foundation had been criticized for excessive spending and a lack of transparency. Under Shangraw's direction the foundation received four-star ratings from Charity Navigator for five consecutive years for its philanthropic investments, transparency and fundraising efficiency. In 2014, Shangraw announced that the quantity of new gifts and commitments to the foundation had been restored to pre-recession levels.

Also in 2014, Shangraw directed the creation and implementation of PitchFunder, a crowdfunding program that allows students and faculty to raise money for projects and programs. PitchFunder went live online in March 2014, generating national attention.

Since 2014, the ASU Foundation has been recognized as one of the Top Companies to Work for in Arizona by CareerBuilder and AZcentral.com for six consecutive years.

== CEO of ASU Enterprise Partners ==
In July 2016, Shangraw was named chief executive officer of ASU Enterprise Partners, a private, nonprofit organization composed of distinct entities – the ASU Foundation for A New American University, ASU Research Enterprise (ASURE), Arizona Technology Enterprises (AzTE), University Realty LLC, and the Research Collaboratory at ASU – that raise, create, and invest resources for Arizona State University by engaging in fundraising, applied research, technology transfer, realty, and collaborative research initiatives.

In its first year of operation, Enterprise Partners was named a Top Company to Work For in Arizona by Republic Media and AZcentral.com.

== President of Cintana Education ==
In May 2020, Shangraw was named president of Cintana Education. Cintana Education was founded in 2019 by Douglas Becker. The company has partnered with Arizona State University to work with universities around the globe to improve educational outcomes and access to higher education.

== President of American University Kyiv and American University of Technology ==
Shangraw was appointed founding president of American University Kyiv in November 2021. The university launched in early 2022 but delayed academic operations due to the Russian invasion of Ukraine. He was president until May 2023. In 2024, Shangraw assumed the role of founding president of the American University of Technology in Tashkent, Uzbekistan. The institution is a Greenfield University developed in partnership with Arizona State University.

== Personal life ==
Shangraw is married to Mary Shangraw and the couple resides in Paradise Valley, Arizona. They have three children.

== Selected research and publications ==
- Michael M. Crow and R.F. Shangraw Jr. (2016), "Revisiting "Public Administration as a Design Science" for the Twenty-First Century Public University," Public Administration Review (17 May 2016)
- Rick Shangraw Jr. and Augustine Cheng (2011), "A New Prescription for Technology Transfer," Inside Higher Ed (28 July 2011)
- Sharlissa Moore and R.F. Shangraw Jr. (2011), "Managing Risk and Uncertainty in Large-Scale University Research Projects," Research Management Review, v. 18, no. 2 (Fall-Winter 2011): 59–78.
- Ralph F. Shangraw Jr. and Michael M. Crow (1989), “Public Administration as a Design Science.” Public Administration Review 49, no. 2 (March/April 1989): 153–58.
- R.F. Shangraw Jr., "Contingency Estimating for Environmental Projects" in Hazardous Waste Cost Control, Richard A. Selg, ed., 139–56. New York: Marcel Dekker, 1993.
- R.F. Shangraw Jr., "How Public Managers Use Information: An experiment examining choices of computer and printed information." Public Management Review 46 (November 1986): 506–15.
