= Mapúa University =

Private university in Metro Manila, Philippines

- Pamantasang Mapúa (Filipino)
- Former name: Mapúa Institute of Technology (1925–2017)
- Motto: "Learn, Discover, Create"
- Type: Private; research; non-sectarian; higher education institution
- Established: January 25, 1925; 101 years ago
- Founder: Tomás Bautista Mapúa
- Parent institution: iPeople Inc. (under Yuchengco Group of Companies)
- Accreditation: ABET; Seoul Accord; PACUCOA; PCS-ICAB; PTC-ACBET
- Academic affiliations: ASU-Cintana Alliance; Intramuros Consortium; PACU
- Chairperson: Helen Y. Dee
- President: Dodjie S. Maestrecampo
- Faculty: c. 500 (2020)
- Undergraduates: c. 10000 (2020)
- Location: Intramuros, Metro Manila, Philippines; 14°35′27″N 120°58′40″E
- Campus: Intramuros: 1.79 ha (17,900 m^{2}) Makati: 0.5114 ha (5,114 m^{2}); Multiple sites; urban
- Language: English (medium of instruction)
- TV Station: TV Mapúa (2023–present)
- Radio Station: Mapúa Radio Cardinal (2016–present)
- Colors: Red and gold (university); Blue/silver (college/high school)
- Nickname: Mapúa Cardinals
- Sporting affiliations: NCAA
- Website: www.mapua.edu.ph

- Location in Manila Location in Metro Manila Location in Luzon Location in the Philippines

Mapúa University (Filipino: Pamantasang Mapúa), also known simply as Mapúa or MU, is a private research-oriented non-sectarian university located in Metro Manila, Philippines. The university was founded in 1925 by the first registered Filipino architect, Tomás Mapúa, a graduate of Cornell University in New York, US. In 2000, the university was acquired by the Yuchengco Group of Companies.

The university's main campus is located in the historic Intramuros district of Manila, with a satellite campus located in Makati. The university is home to 10 degree-granting colleges and one secondary school department. It has nine programs recognized by the Commission on Higher Education (CHED) as Centers of Excellence and Centers of Development. It also has 11 programs accredited by ABET, becoming the first university in Southeast Asia to receive accreditation from the organization. The university also owns and operates the Mapúa Malayan Colleges Laguna, the Mapúa Malayan Colleges Mindanao, and the Malayan High School of Science.

== History ==
=== Early years ===
Founded as the Mapúa Institute of Technology on January 25, 1925, by Tomás B. Mapúa, a graduate of Cornell University and the first registered Filipino architect and civil engineer Gonzalo T. Vales as an Architecture and Civil engineering school, it is the first institution in the Philippines to offer a Bachelor's degree in Architecture. When the school opened in 1925, there were 75 students and 15 faculty members. Classes were held in a rented commercial building in Carriedo Street near FEATI University in Quiapo, Manila. In 1928, the Mapúa High School was established in Doroteo Jose Street through Rizal Avenue in Santa Cruz, Manila. In 1930, Mapúa joined the National Collegiate Athletic Association as the Mapúa Cardinals.

=== World War II and post-war development ===
During World War II, Mapúa's Manila campus was used as a garrison by the Japanese forces during the occupation of Manila, and all classes and organizations were suspended. The Institute would continue to suffer throughout the war as the effort of the institute to continue the studies of the students were suspended and Senior students were forced to prematurely graduate. The institute's campus was also severely damaged. As a part of the rehabilitation program, the former "De Luxe Fashion School" in Doroteo Jose was leased in 1948 and housed the high school department until 1998.

In 1951, the Mapúa family acquired a piece of land from the La Corporación Fransicana in Intramuros. The site eventually became the institute's main campus, opening in 1956 with construction completed in 1963. All college programs in the Doroteo José campus were relocated to the Intramuros campus in 1973.

Tomás B. Mapúa died on December 22, 1965, and his son, Óscar M. Mapúa Sr., a graduate in civil engineering from the Massachusetts Institute of Technology, took over the presidency until his death in 1998.

During this period, the institute gained prominence as an engineering school as it took the top 10 and top 20 slots in most licensing exams (such as those from the Professional Regulation Commission (PRC) since 1973 for Architecture and Engineering). It also achieved the highest passing rates in the board exams among other competing schools in architecture and engineering.

=== Acquisition by the Yuchengco Group of Companies ===
Under the presidency of Oscar Mapúa Jr., grandson of Tomás B. Mapúa, the Mapúa family sold the institute to the Yuchengco Group of Companies (YGC) headed by Alfonso T. Yuchengco on March 16, 2000.

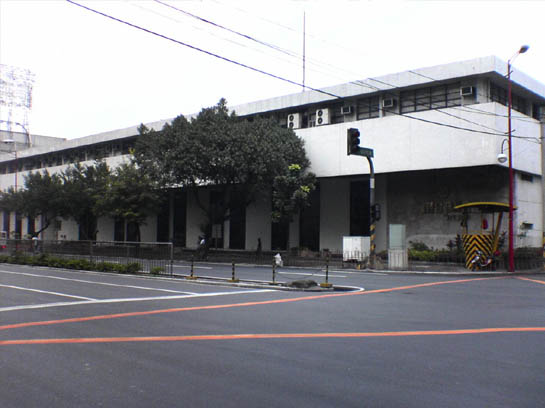
The former Mapúa IT Center along Gil Puyat Avenue, Makati, taken in 2005

In 2002, the old RCBC Building at 333 Gil Puyat Avenue in Makati was purchased and converted into the Makati campus of the university, where the School of Information Technology (SoIT) was originally from the Intramuros Campus. As part of promoting the School of IT, the Mapúa IT Center was established. Offering 2-year Associate degree that eventually would land (ladderized) a four-year Bachelor's degree IT degree in Mapúa. Meanwhile, Mapúa High School was closed in 2005.

Along with the establishment of the Malayan High School of Science and Malayan Colleges Laguna, the new ownership intended to encompass all its educational institutions under the name Malayan University. Pending the institute's elevation to university status, the institute was planned to take the name Malayan Colleges in the meantime. According to the president, the renaming was a step towards institute's goal of becoming a university. The proposal was controversial, with students, faculty, and alumni protesting against the name change on February 14, 2005. The spokesperson of the National Alliance of Mapua Alumni (NAMA) also alleged that the Yuchengcos wanted to change the institute's name to escape tax liabilities and sought a congressional probe against the renaming. The institute denied the allegations, and clarified that the name "Mapúa Institute of Technology" will be applied to the College of Engineering, Architecture and IT. The legal name of the institute was changed to Malayan Colleges, although the entire institute continued to operate under the Mapúa brand.

=== University era ===
On May 18, 2017, the Commission on Higher Education granted the institute university status; the institute was renamed as Mapúa University.

On January 8, 2018, YGC and Ayala Corporation, through a joint press statement, announced the merger of Ayala Education and iPeople (IPO), Mapúa's parent company, with IPO being the surviving entity. The merger was completed on May 2, 2019, with the Yuchengco Group of Companies owning 51.3% of iPeople and Ayala Corporation with 33.5% share of the said company.

On August 1, 2021, the old Makati campus at Gil Puyat Avenue was closed. It relocated its site at a former Bormaheco property along Pablo Ocampo Street, which was acquired and converted by the Yuchengco Group in 2018.

== Campus ==
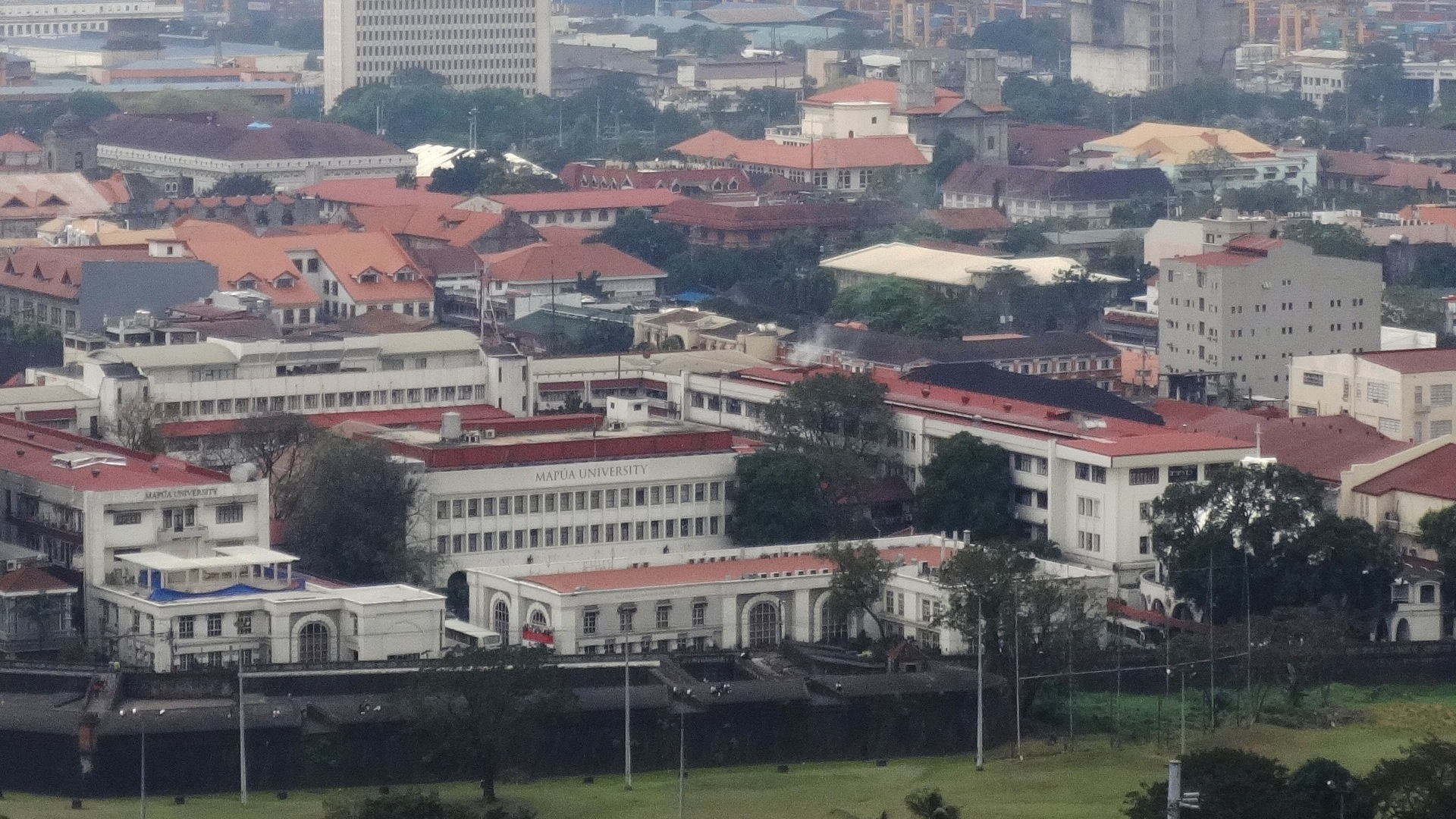
The main Mapúa campus in Intramuros, Manila

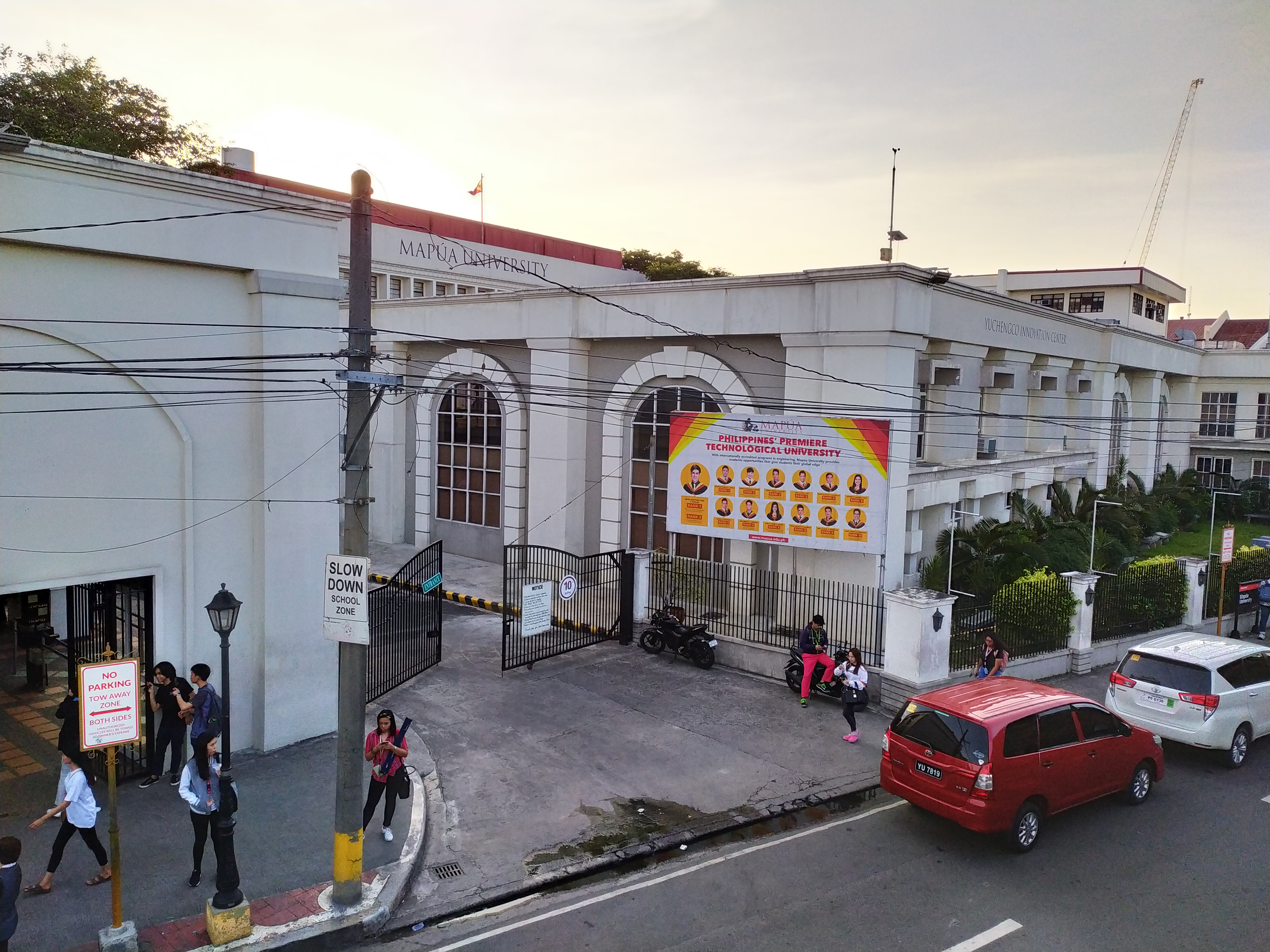
Outside the Intramuros campus

=== Intramuros ===
The main Mapúa campus is located within the walls of Intramuros, Manila. The Intramuros campus hosts most of the university's colleges. The campus has undergone several renovations and is equipped for further studies in the fields of engineering.

The Manila Campus consists of 7 buildings:

- The Juan Mapúa Memorial Hall (Administration Building) houses the Registrar's Office and the Treasury
- The South Building houses the multimedia arts and sciences, digital cinema, industrial engineering, civil engineering, environmental and sanitary engineering, architecture and industrial design facilities, and senior high school classrooms.
- The Southwest Building serves as the intersection of the West and South Building. It also houses the Multimedia and Visual Arts Facilities and Senior High School classrooms.
- The West Building houses the canteen, the Physics department, audio visual (AV) rooms, the library, and Senior High School classrooms.
- The Northwest Building serves as the intersection of West and North Building
- The North Building houses the Chemistry, Chemical Engineering, Electrical Engineering, Electronics Engineering, Computer Engineering, Mechanical Engineering, Earth and Material Science Engineering, Psychology Department, Graduate Studies Facilities, and Senior High School classrooms.
- The Yuchengco Innovation Center houses the institute's new laboratories for research and development purposes. It stands on where the Student Pavilion used to be.
- The Southeast Building serves as an extension of the South Building that directly faces the East Building. It houses the security office, bookstore, and the admission's office.
- Gymnasium: The place where Physical Education activities are held, as well as game and concert events, and academic advising proceedings during enrollments.
- St. Rita's Chapel: The chapel near the North entrance of the institute. It is where masses are regularly held and extends to the east side as the Guidance's office.

=== Makati ===
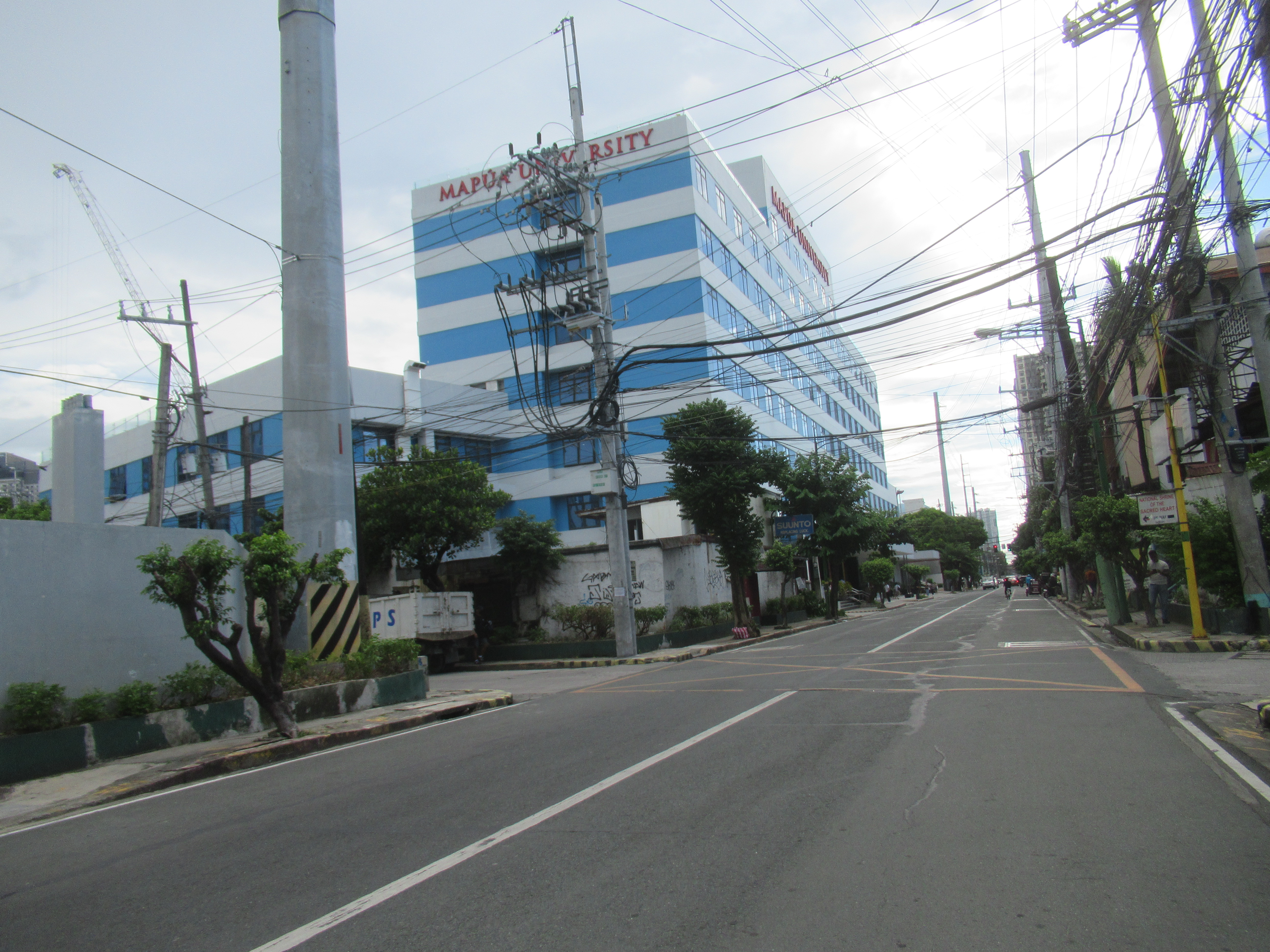
Makati campus

The Mapúa campus located in Makati occupies a 5,114-square-meter (55,050 sq ft) site at 1191 Pablo Ocampo Sr. Extension in Barangay Santa Cruz. The lot was previously owned by Bormaheco before being purchased by the university in 2018. The new 8-storey Makati campus hosts the senior high school, School of Information Technology (SoIT) and E.T. Yuchengco School of Business and Management.

It previously occupied the Mapúa Information Technology Center (MITC) at the corner of Gil Puyat Avenue and Reposo Street from 2002 to 2021.

== Administration and organization ==
=== Schools and departments ===
Mapúa has fourteen (14) degree-granting colleges called schools, as well as four departments commonly grouped under the School of Foundational Studies. The university also has a senior high school department.

==== Intramuros Campus ====
- School of Architecture, Industrial Design, and the Built Environment (ArIDBE)
- School of Artificial Intelligence, Electrical, Computer, and Electronics Engineering (AIECEE)
- School of Chemical, Biological, and Materials Engineering and Sciences (CBMES)
- School of Civil, Environmental, and Geological Engineering (CEGE)
- School of Industrial Engineering and Engineering Management (IE-EMg)
- School of Mechanical, Manufacturing, and Energy Engineering (MMEE)
- School of Foundational Studies and Education (SFSE)
- Department of Liberal Arts
- Department of Mathematics
- Department of Physical Education and Athletics
- Department of Physics
- Mapúa Senior High School

==== Makati Campus ====
- E.T. Yuchengco School of Business (in collaboration with Arizona State University) (ETYSB)
- School of Health Sciences (in collaboration with Arizona State University) (SoHS)
- School of Information Technology (SoIT)
- School of Multimedia and Digital Arts (SoMDA)
- School of Medicine (in collaboration with Arizona State University) (SoM)
- School of Nursing (in collaboration with Arizona State University) (SoN)
- Mapúa Senior High School

==== Ayala Malls Manila Bay Campus ====
- School of Tourism and Hospitality Management (STHM)

=== Subsidiaries and affiliated schools ===
The Malayan Education System Inc., operating under the name Mapúa University, owns and operates the Mapúa Malayan Colleges Laguna in Cabuyao (who in turn operates the Mapúa Malayan Digital College or MMDC), the Mapúa Malayan Colleges Mindanao in Davao City, and the Malayan High School of Science in Paco, Manila as its subsidiaries. The university's parent company, iPeople Inc. (IPO) merged with AC Education, the education arm of Ayala Corporation in 2019, acquiring its subsidiaries: University of Nueva Caceres, National Teachers College, and APEC Schools. All schools have a combined student population of over 60,000.

== Academics ==
Mapúa offers 51 undergraduate programs, 33 postgraduate programs, and 9 doctorate degree programs across its three campuses. In 2006, the university shifted its educational system (Note: From traditional education system?) to an outcome-based system. According to Mapúa president Reynaldo Vea, this was done to address structural unemployment in the Philippines. In 2020, the university launched the Mapúa Ubiquitous Online Experience (Mapúa ÚOx), offering fully online asynchronous graduate and undergraduate programs.

=== School calendar system ===
The university operated on a quarter system called the "Quarterm", shifting from a semestral system in 2002. This academic system was intended to allow students to graduate faster (e.g., the original 5-year engineering programs could be taken in four years) and to focus on less, interrelated course subjects in an 11-week term.

Starting Academic Year 2024-2025, (Note: August 6 to 9, 2024 for registration of enrollment. August 12, 2024 for start of classes.) Mapúa shifted from its former four-terms-per-year system (Quarterm) to three-terms-per-year system (Trimester).

After just two years of implementation, Mapúa will shift back to its Quarterm system from the Trimester system, starting Academic Year 2026-2027. This shift is in compliance with the recent DOLE ruling, which directs the university to return to its previous compensation structure and pay schedule for faculty and staff.

=== Admissions ===
The university administers the Mapúa Scholastic Aptitude Exam (MSAE) annually. In 2020, the MSAE was replaced by the Mapúa Program Placement Assessment (MPASS) due to the onslaught of the COVID-19 pandemic. The MPASS is still used as the admission exam today. The MPASS measures the student's abilities to identify the suitable college programs or senior high school strand for the applicant.

=== Rankings and reputation ===
University rankings

Global – Overall
- THE World: 1501+ (2023)

Regional – Overall
- QS Asia: 501-550 (2022)

National – Overall
- QS National: 7 (2022)

Globally, Mapua ranks 1501+ in the Times Higher Education (THE) World University Rankings in 2023. It has also been ranked in the QS Asian University Rankings (501-550) in 2022, and THE Impact Rankings 2022 (601-800).

The Commission on Higher Education (CHED) has recognized Mapúa's Mechanical engineering (ME), Computer engineering (CoE), Civil engineering (CE), Environmental and Sanitary engineering (EnSE), Chemical engineering (ChE), Electrical engineering (EE), Information technology (IT) and Electronics engineering (ECE) programs as Centers of Excellence (COE), while Industrial engineering (IE) and Computer science (CS) programs are for Centers for Development (COD). The university has also been accredited by the Philippine Association of Colleges and Universities Commission on Accreditation (PACUCOA), with one Level IV program, six Level III programs, four Level II programs, and six Level I programs.

As of April 2022, the university has 14 undergraduate programs accredited by the Accreditation Board for Engineering and Technology (ABET), with 11 programs accredited by the Engineering Accreditation Commission of ABET and three undergraduate programs accredited by the Computing Accreditation Commission of ABET.

== Discoveries and innovation ==
- Mapúa was the first institute in the Philippines to feature a RFID or Radio Frequency ID card system which they call "CARDINAL Plus" which stands for CARD and Integrated Network Access Log-in Plus. It is a two-piece plastic PVC card with a microchip and antenna inserted in between. The CARDINAL Plus functions not only as an identification card but acts as a Library card as well. It also has the capability to store student logs, grades, guidance records, schedules, and more. As a security measure, all students flash their cards on top of the readers at the entrance. A person will be identified easily with his photo and information appearing on the monitor. It also serves as an ATM Card. Other schools adopted the RFID identification system later on.
- Mapúa has its own SIM card, the "Mapúa Cardinal SIM" which is powered by Smart Communications. The Cardinal SIM contains all the usual features of a regular Smart SIM card with the addition of the "MapúaTXT service", which allows students to receive important school announcements and check for the remaining matriculation charges on their mobile phones.
- The Mapúa Robotics Team is a pioneering organization that has been granted several major projects by the Philippine Navy, the Department of Science and Technology (DOST) and the Philippine National Police (PNP) intending to modernize the weapons and equipment used by the Philippine government. Projects, to name a few, include the following:
  - Mechanical Anti-terrorist Concept or MAC (a Bomb disposal robot now used by the PNP in Makati)
  - The Project Trident Strike (a remotely operated Sentry gun mounted in naval gunships and perimeter defenses)
  - Project Phalanx, a compact version of the Trident Strike.
  - MAC-2 (an improved version of the first Mechanical Anti-Terrorist Concept), will be released by the Robotics Team by February 2010.
  - The Philippine Electric Vehicle (Electric car designed for urban mass transportation sponsored by the DOST)
  - The Submersible Rover (a scouting equipment for the Philippine Navy)
- The Department of Science and Technology (Philippines) unveiled on February 28, 2024 the Filipino-made Safe, Efficient and Sustainable Solar-Assisted Plug-In Electric Boat (SESSY E-Boat) at the Manila Yacht Club. The PHP19-million project was developed by Mapua University researchers.
- On March 9, 2024, University President Dodjie S. Maestrecampo announced the development of AI-integrated education curricula. The courses include Modules like Basic Prompt Engineering with ChatGPT and AI Foundations: Scripting ChatGPT with Python. It coordinates with Arizona State University, Rick Shangraw and OpenAI.

== See also ==
- Mapúa Cardinals
- Mapúa Cardinal Singers
- Mapúa Institute of Technology ROTC
- Academic grading in the Philippines
