= Shangraw =

Shangraw is a surname. Notable people with the surname include:

- Percival L. Shangraw (1897–1988), American judge
- Rick Shangraw (born 1959), American businessman
