= Mi-Ai Parrish =

American journalist

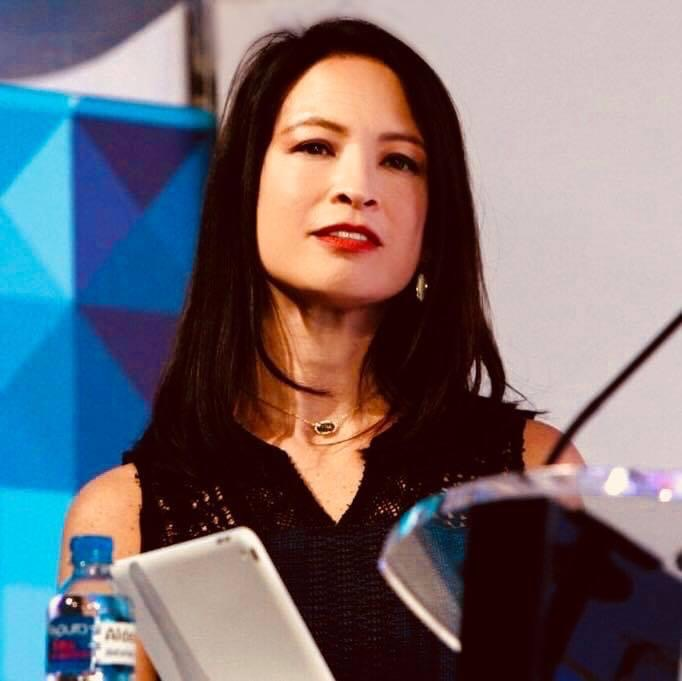
Parrish presenting on Media Change for Aldea Digital in 2018

Mi-Ai Parrish is an American journalist and media executive, including former president and publisher of USA TODAY NETWORK Arizona, The Arizona Republic, a daily newspaper, and azcentral.com in Phoenix, Arizona, the first person of color in the role. The Republic won a Pulitzer Prize during her tenure.

She leads Arizona State University Media Enterprise and holds an endowed chair at Walter Cronkite School of Journalism and Mass Communications as Sue Clark-Johnson Professor of Media Innovation and Leadership. She is CEO and President of MAP Strategies Group.

She was the first woman and person of color to serve as president and publisher of The Kansas City Star and kansascity.com. She was president and publisher of The Idaho Statesman, which was a Pulitzer Prize finalist in breaking news. She was a journalist at Chicago Sun-Times, San Francisco Chronicle, The Minnesota Star Tribune, Virginian-Pilot and Arizona Republic.

She is a graduate of the University of Maryland and named to its Hall of Fame. Parrish has served four times as a juror for the Pulitzer Prize.

== Awards and honors ==
Parrish is a 2020 Women of Distinction honoree, 2018 winner of the Ocotillo Award for Legislative Advocacy, 2017 winner of the ATHENA Businesswoman of the Year, recipient of the Asian Corporate Entrepreneur Leader Corporate Champion, and PSA Behavioral Health Corporate Champion award winner. She was 2016 Best Opinion Writer in the USA TODAY Network for work on the First Amendment and freedom of speech. Parrish was honored with Gannett Company's annual award for company Purpose. A four-time Pulitzer juror, she is in the University of Maryland Hall of Fame.

She is on the board of directors of the Associated Press, is vice chairwoman of the Banner Health board, secretary of the Greater Phoenix Leadership board, appointed by Gov. Doug Ducey as a Zanjero, and serves on the boards of the Greater Phoenix Economic Council, O'Connor Institute for American Democracy, Poynter Institute Advisory Board, The 19th* News, Common Sense Media, and Arizona Community Foundation.

Parrish has provided commentary on free speech and the First Amendment to outlets including ABC World News Tonight, CNN, Rachel Maddow Show on MSNBC, CBS Evening News, Sky TV, UnoTV, BBC and others. Her work has been covered in the Washington Post, USA TODAY, New York Times and more.

== 2016 U.S. presidential race ==
Parrish has been the focus of politically motivated threats of physical violence based on The Arizona Republic, a Republican-supporting newspaper, endorsing Hillary Clinton, the Democratic president nominee. The newspaper staff have been threatened with physical violence.

== 2017 Arizona Legislature Sex Harassment Investigations ==
After a female member of the Arizona State House of Representatives lodged allegations of harassment by another Arizona house member, other women spoke out. Parrish published an account of an encounter with the accused legislator that had been witnessed by her attorney.
