= Mapúa Malayan Colleges Mindanao =

Private college in Davao, Philippines

Coordinates: 7.0639°N 125.5957°E

- Former name: Malayan Colleges Mindanao (2015–2022)
- Motto: Excellence and Relevance
- Type: Private, research, nonsectarian university
- Established: 2015
- Parent institution: iPeople Inc. (under Yunchengco Group of Companies)
- Location: General McArthur Highway, Matina, Davao City, Philippines
- Campus: Davao: ~2.5 ha (25,000 m^{2})
- Colors: Navy blue/silver & Red/white
- Nickname: Wizards/Mages
- Mascots: Whizzy & Dash
- Website: Official website

Mapúa Malayan Colleges Mindanao (Mapúa MCM) is a private nonsectarian college and the second subsidiary of the Mapúa University after Mapúa Malayan Colleges Laguna in 2006. Established in 2015, it officially began its operations on July 8, 2018, marking a significant expansion of the Mapúa University's reach into Mindanao.

== History ==
Logo used from 2015 to 2022

Mapúa University announced the significant expansion of the Mapúa franchise into Mindanao through its subsidiary Malayan Colleges Inc., incorporated a new entity, Malayan Colleges Mindanao Inc. (MCMI), with substantial capitalization to establish and operate the Davao campus. MCMI acquired a 2.3-hectare property in Davao City, with construction of facilities slated to begin in the first quarter of 2016.

Malayan Colleges Mindanao started its operations in July 8, 2018, offering collegiate, university, and graduate courses. This move underscored Mapúa's continued commitment to expanding its presence in the education sector, leveraging Davao City's status as a burgeoning center for trade, commerce, and business process outsourcing in Mindanao.

On June 10, 2022, Malayan Colleges Mindanao (MCM) rebranded its name to Mapúa Malayan Colleges Mindanao (Mapúa MCM) alongside its new logo. This change highlights Mapúa's heritage and its commitment to high-quality education and global standards.

"This name-change will strengthen our way of presenting ourselves as a Mapúa school, a learner-centred and outcomes-based learning institution, providing an environment where students can acquire relevant skills, knowledge, and values to launch their careers and passions," Dr. Dodjie S. Maestrecampo, Mapúa MCM President, explained.

On April 27, 2023, Mapúa MCM renovated its facade together with its new name and logo. Mapúa MCM employs a learner-centered, outcomes-based approach, providing students with personalized education, industry-relevant skills, and a strong focus on research and innovation. The campus features modern facilities, including hybrid flexible classrooms and the Blackboard learning management system. Additionally, the institution has established international partnerships, such as with Arizona State University, to offer students access to the latest educational innovations.

On October 10, 2025 a 7.4 earthquake damaged the campus.
