= Alfonso Yuchengco =

Filipino businessman

Alfonso Tiaoqui Yuchengco
- 楊應琳
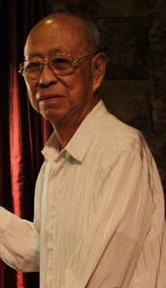

15th Permanent Representative of the Philippines to the United Nations
- In office 2001 – December 31, 2002
- Nominated by: Gloria Macapagal Arroyo
- Preceded by: Felipe Mabilangan
- Succeeded by: Lauro Baja

Ambassador of the Philippines to Japan
- In office 1995–1998
- President: Fidel V. Ramos; Joseph Estrada
- Preceded by: Domingo Siazon Jr.
- Succeeded by: Romeo A. Arguelles

Personal details
- Born: February 6, 1923 Manila, Insular Government of the Philippine Islands
- Died: April 15, 2017 (aged 94) Parañaque, Philippines
- Resting place: Manila Memorial Park
- Spouses: Paz Sycip; Teresita Gómez
- Children: 9
- Parent(s): Enrique Yuchengco; María Tiaoqui
- Education: Far Eastern University (BSc.)
- Occupation: Accountant, banker, businessman, diplomat, investor, philanthropist
- Known for: Founder of Yuchengco Group of Companies, Rizal Commercial Banking Corporation
- Nickname: AY

Alfonso Tiaoqui Yuchengco (simplified Chinese: 杨应琳; traditional Chinese: 楊應琳; pinyin: Yáng Yìng-lín; Pe̍h-ōe-jī: Iûⁿ Èng-lîm; February 6, 1923 – April 15, 2017) was a Filipino accountant, banker, businessman and ambassador. He was the founder of Rizal Commercial Banking Corporation (RCBC), one of the largest family-owned conglomerates in the Philippines.

== Early life and education ==
Yuchengco was born to Enrique Yuchengco, the founder of China Insurance and Surety Co. of the Yuchengco Group and Maria Tiaoqui in Binondo, Manila in 1923. Yuchengco attended a local Manila grade school, before attending De La Salle University for high school and finished in 1940. Then he held a Bachelor of Science in Commerce, major in Accountancy, from the Far Eastern University. He took and passed the licensure examinations for certified public accountants.

== Business career ==
When Don Enrique died in 1953, the young Alfonso took over the reins of the family enterprise starting with Malayan Insurance. Yuchengco was the chairman of the Yuchengco Group of Companies, and concurrently the chairman of the Board of MICO Equities, Inc. (holding company of the Malayan Group of Insurance Companies); Pan Malayan Management and Investment Corporation; Mapúa Institute of Technology; Nippon Life Insurance Company; and the Rizal Commercial Banking Corporation.

He had been the chairman of the Board of Directors of GPL Holdings; House of Investments, Inc.; BA Savings Bank; Dole Philippines; Philippine Long Distance Telephone Company; Benguet Corporation; and the Philippine Fuji Xerox Corporation.

=== Academe ===
Yuchengco was the chairman of the Board of Trustees of the Mapúa University, a top-performing engineering school in the country. He was also the chairman of the Malayan Colleges Laguna, and Malayan High School of Science, an innovative science high school.

He had been a member of the Board of Advisors of the Columbia Business School, one of the leading business schools in the world.

== Diplomacy ==
Yuchengco had been the Philippine Permanent Representative to the United Nations, with the rank of Ambassador Extraordinary and Plenipotentiary (A.E.P.) from 2001 to 2002.

He had also served as Philippine Ambassador to the People's Republic of China from 1986 to 1988; as Philippine Ambassador to Japan in 1995; as Presidential Adviser on APEC Matters in 1998; as Presidential Adviser on Foreign Affairs in 2004; and Presidential Special Envoy to Greater China, Japan and Korea.

In 2005, President Gloria Macapagal Arroyo appointed Yuchengco to the Consultative Commission for Charter Change, a special body tasked to review and recommend changes to the 1987 Constitution.

== Other interests ==
Yuchengco was the chairman of the Board of Bantayog ng mga Bayani Foundation. He was also the Chair Emeritus and Member of the Board of Governors of the Philippine Ambassadors Foundation; and Chair Emeritus and Past President of the Philippine Ambassadors Association.

He was a member of the Board of Judges and a Principal Sponsor in the Mother Teresa Awards.

He established a generous grant at the University of San Francisco to create the Maria Elena G. Yuchengco Philippine Studies Program.

== Money laundering scandals ==
The RCBC created an affiliate educational life-insurance company Pacific Plans Inc. which suddenly collapsed in 2005 amid showing of accounts laundered for illegal purposes. A pending class suit has been filed immediately after in court. Meanwhile, the Anti-Money Laundering Act was cited against RCBC for creating dummy accounts to flow in 81 million USD from the Bangladesh Central Bank despite the lack of consent. Part of the money was used for casino operations, resulting in another lawsuit for RCBC.

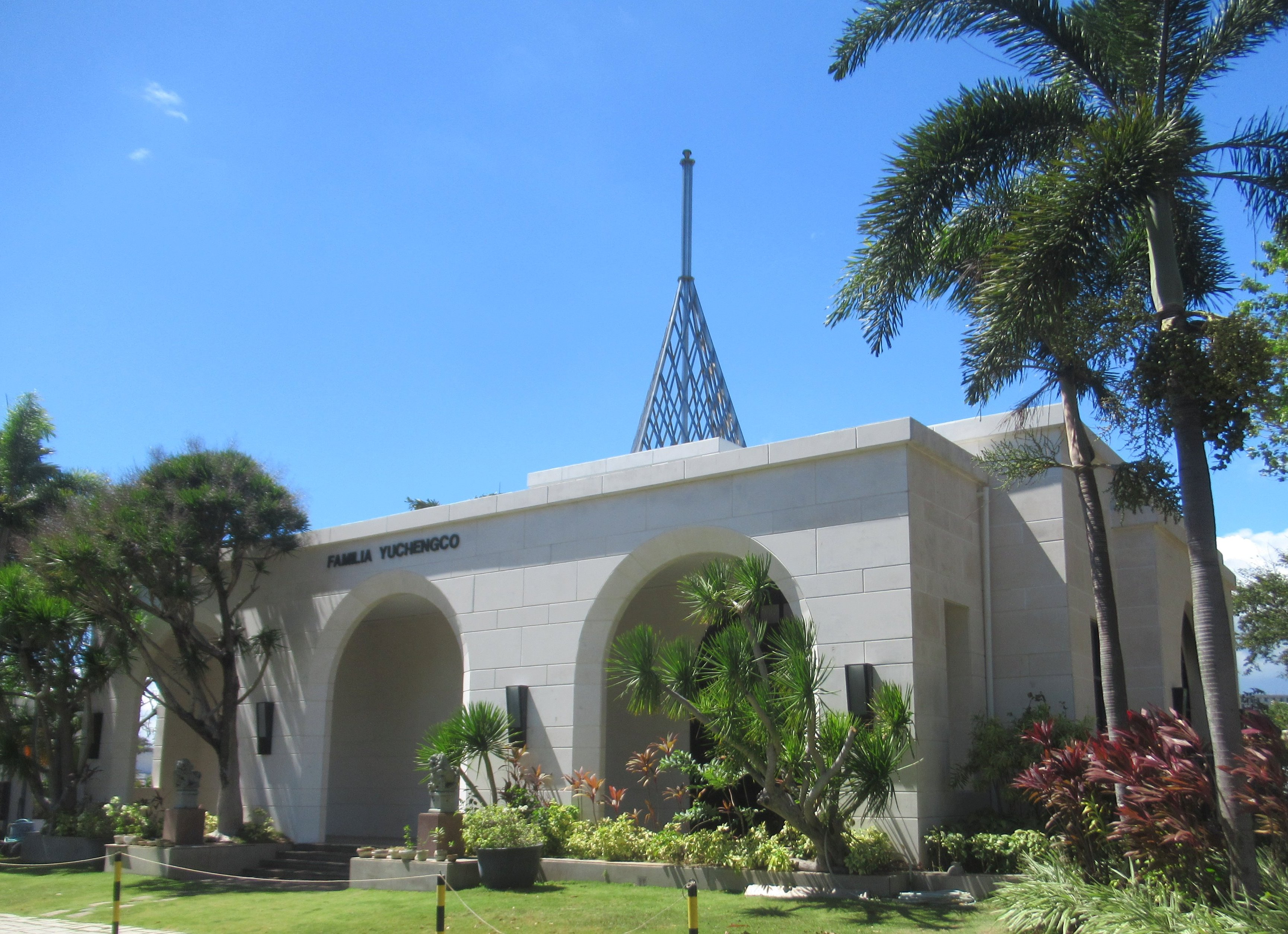
Yuchengco's family mausoleum at Manila Memorial Park – Sucat.

== Awards ==
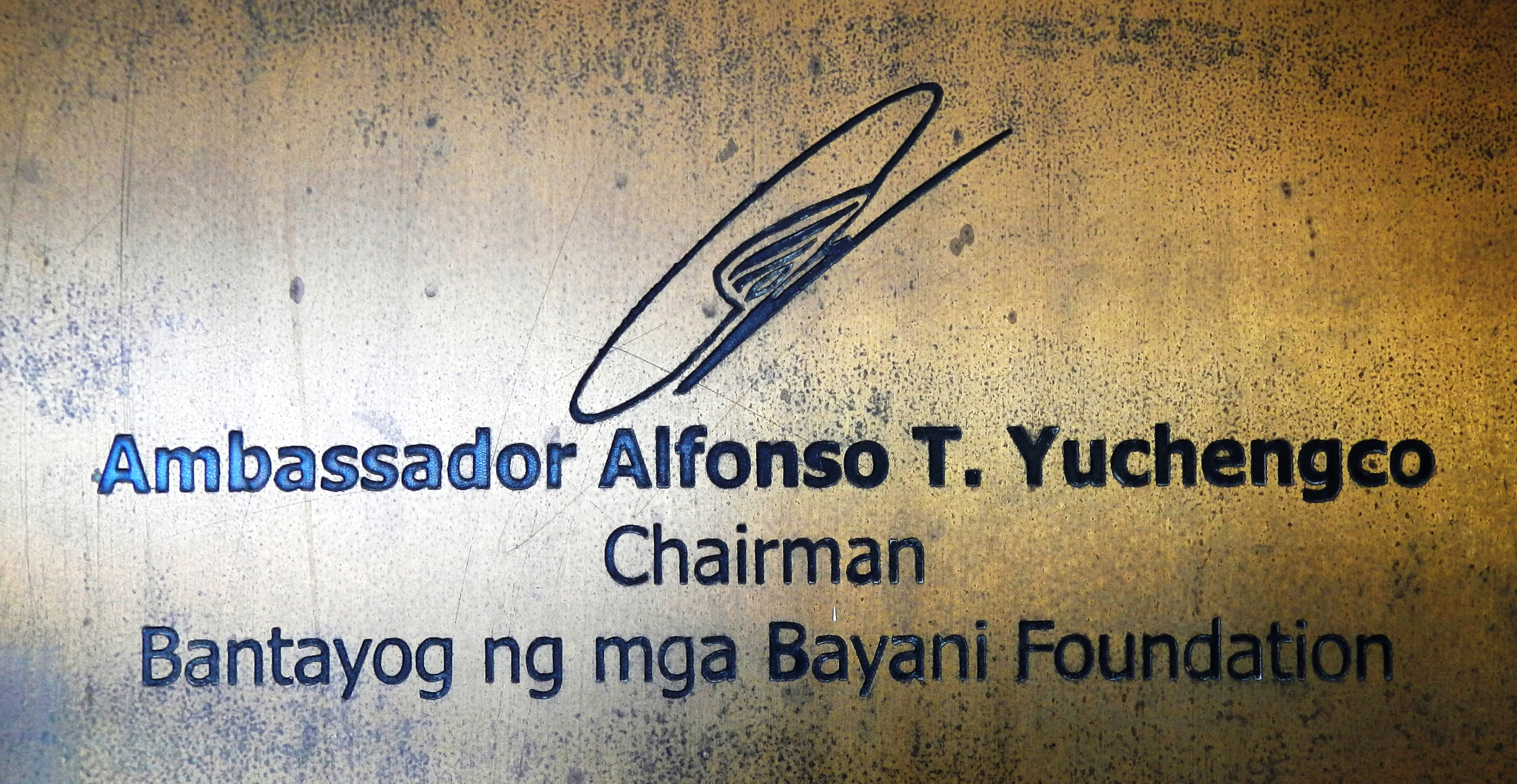
Signature

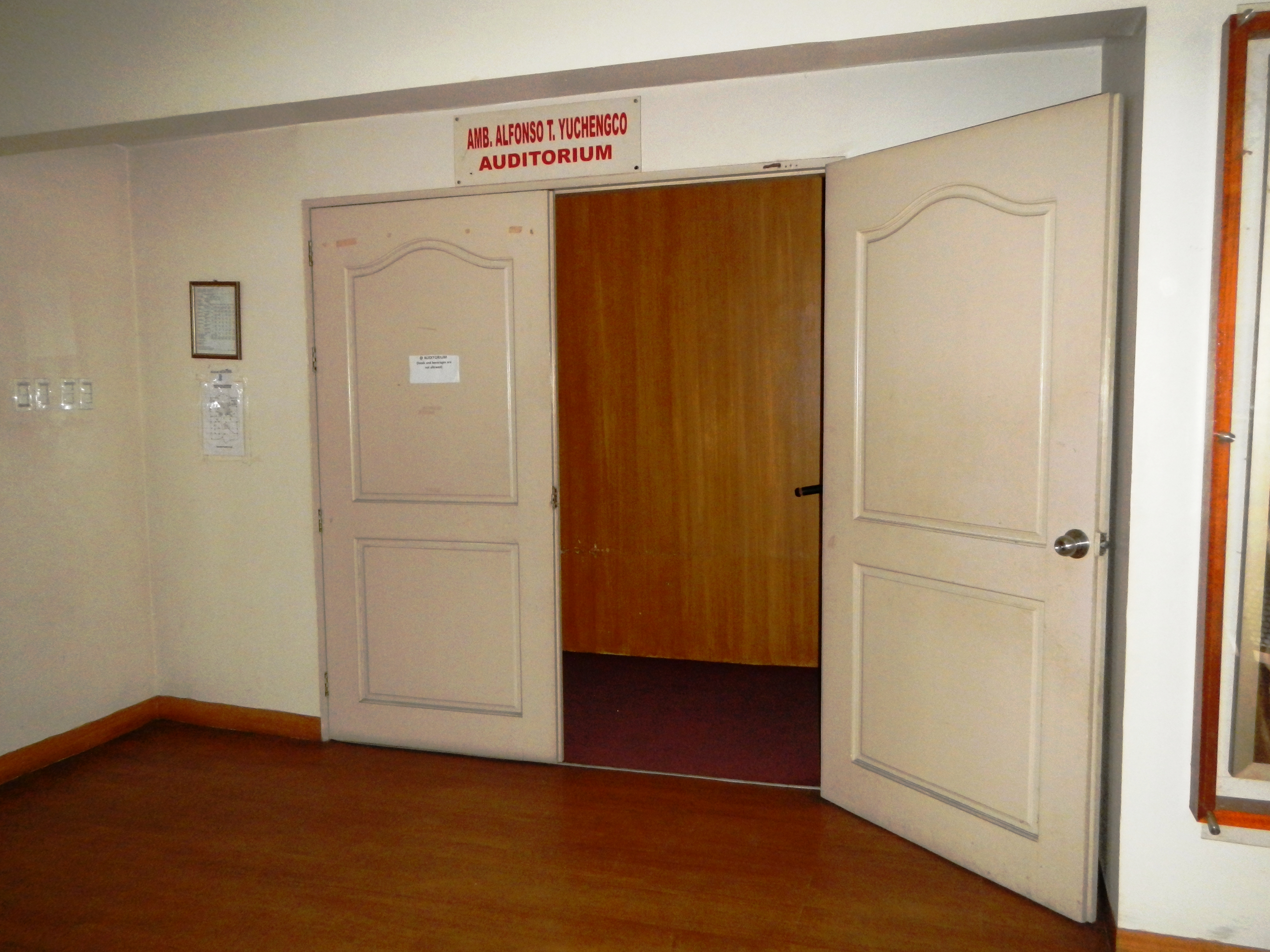
Auditorium, Bantayog ng mga Bayani

Yuchengco has received the following awards and citations:

- Order of the Sacred Treasure, Gold and Silver Star, from the Emperor of Japan, 2003.
- Grand Cordon of the Order of the Rising Sun, from the Emperor of Japan
- Order of Sikatuna, Rank of Datu, from then President Fidel Valdez Ramos
- Knight Grand Officer of Rizal, Knights of Rizal.
- Order of Lakandula, Rank of Bayani (Grand Cross).
- Most Distinguished Alumnus and Hall of Fame Awardee, Far Eastern University, 1955 and 2003.

Diplomatic posts
Preceded by Domingo Siazon Jr.	Ambassador of the Philippines to Japan; 1995–1998	Succeeded by Romeo A. Arguelles
