= National Teachers College =

Private college in Manila, Philippines

- Motto: Ang Karunungan ay Tanglaw
- Motto in English: Knowledge is a Torch
- Type: Private; 60% stake owned by iPeople, Inc. (Yuchengco Group of Companies - 51.30% / Ayala Education, Inc. - 33.50%)
- Established: September 29, 1928
- President: Alfredo I. Ayala
- Location: Quiapo, Manila, Metro Manila, Philippines; 14°35′53″N 120°59′21″E
- Campus: Campuses: Quiapo Mendiola
- Colors: Royal Blue
- Nickname: Light Bearers
- Website: www.ntc.edu.ph

- Location in Manila Location in Metro Manila Location in Luzon Location in the Philippines

The National Teachers College is a private, non-sectarian, educational institution based in the Philippines, with its campuses are located in Quiapo, Manila and Mendiola. The college offers preschool, basic, and higher education.

== History ==
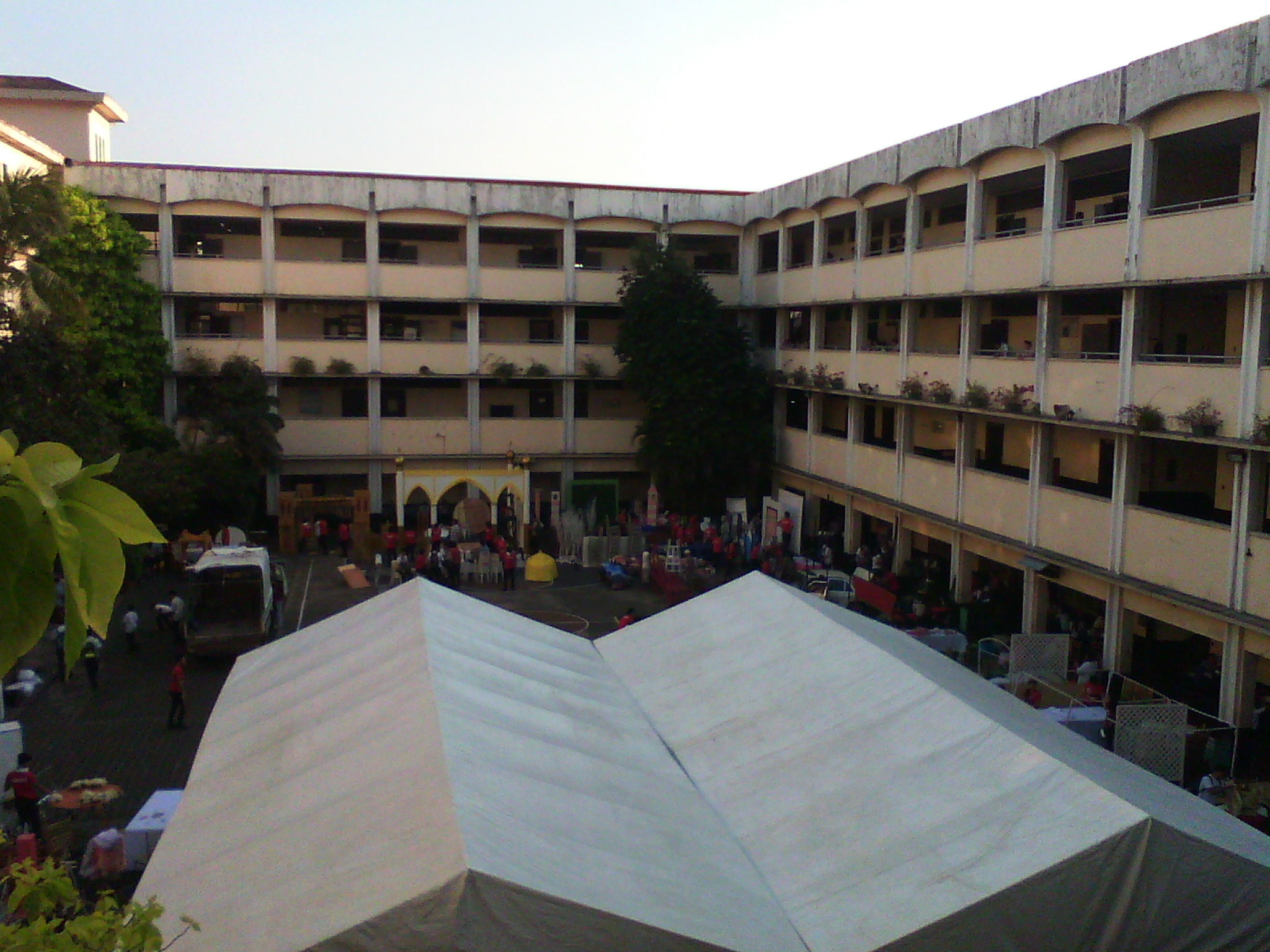
Inside view of the NTC Campus

The National Teachers College was founded and incorporated by Segundo M. Infantado, Sr. and Flora Amoranto Ylagan on September 29, 1928. In accordance with Act No. 1459 as amended, the National Teachers College was authorized by the Department of Public Instruction on April 17, 1929, to operate as an educational institution.

On April 30, 2018, AC Education, Inc. (AEI or AC Education), the wholly owned education arm of Ayala Corporation, assumed ownership of approximately 96% of the outstanding voting shares of NTC. AEI was selected by the NTC Board and its shareholders through a competitive bid process.

On January 8, 2018, Yuchengco Group of Companies and Ayala Corporation, through a joint press statement, has announced the possible merger of their education arms, namely Ayala Education, Inc. and iPeople, Inc, with the iPeople, Inc. being the surviving entity. It has been stated that the potential merger will be finalized in the first quarter of 2018. This will bring together AEI’s APEC Schools and University of Nueva Caceres, National Teachers College and iPeople’s Malayan Education System, operating under the name Mapúa University and its subsidiaries, Malayan Colleges Laguna (MCL) and Malayan Colleges Mindanao (MCM) a combined student population of over 60,000. The transaction was completed on May 2, with the Yuchengco Group owning 51.3% of iPeople and Ayala Corporation with 33.5% share of the said company.

On May 2, 2019, the Merger between AC Education and iPeople was completed, with the Yuchengco Group of Companies owning 51.3% of iPeople and Ayala Corporation with 33.5% share of the said company.

Today, NTC continues to perform its share in educating and training teachers, administrators, supervisors, and other professionals who will serve in the interest of the Republic of the Philippines and the world at large. In June 2024, the NTC signed a five-year lease agreement with the SSpS congregation for the usage of St. Arnold Janssen building and a portion of the former Social Hall at the ground floor of College of the Holy Spirit Manila, and was inaugurated on November 15, 2024 as NTC Mendiola Building.
