= APEC Schools =

Chain of private high schools in the Philippines

- Logo
- Metro Manila and Calabarzon; Philippines

Information
- Type: Private
- Established: 2013
- Grades: 7–12
- Affiliations: iPeople, Inc.
- Website: www.apecschools.edu.ph

APEC Schools is a chain of private high schools based in the Philippines. APEC Schools currently has branches across Metro Manila and Calabarzon regions.

== History ==
APEC Schools was established in 2013 through a partnership between Ayala Corporation and Pearson's Affordable Learning Fund. APEC Schools are managed under the Affordable Private Education Center (APEC) Inc., a joint venture between the two entities. The first APEC Schools branch was opened within the Emilio Aguinaldo College campus in Manila in July 2013. APEC Schools are touted as a low-cost option for secondary education by its proponents.

The Ayala Corporation and House of Investments of the Yuchengco Group had a merger of their education operations in 2019 with Yuchengco Group's iPeople Inc. being the surviving entity. APEC Schools is among the several schools which became under iPeople.

In 2023, the merger of APEC Schools' operating entity APEC Inc. with the National Teachers College was approved. The merger was implemented the following year.
