= Morrison Institute for Public Policy =

Think tank at Arizona State University

Morrison Institute for Public Policy is an Arizona State University resource for objective policy analysis and expertise. Morrison Institute researches public policy issues, informs policymakers and residents, and advises leaders on choices and actions.

As part of the Watts College of Public Service & Community Solutions, the Institute bridges the gap between academic scholarship and public policy development through its services to public and private sector clients and its independent research agenda. The Institute provides public policy research, program evaluation, and public outreach services to many types of public and private organizations in Arizona and throughout the United States.

Morrison Institute was established in 1982 through a grant from Marvin and June Morrison of Gilbert, Arizona, in response to the state's growing need for objective research on public policy issues. Since then, Morrison Institute has conducted work on various topics, including education reform, water resources, health care, human services, urban growth, government structure, arts and culture, technology, quality of life, public finance, the environment, and economic development.

In October 2012, Morrison Institute launched the Morrison Institute Latino Public Policy Center to clarify how and why Latino-related issues affect Arizona's future due to the state's changing demographics and dynamics.

Morrison Institute also manages Arizona Indicators, an online data collection and analysis website for Arizona and the region.

== See also ==
- Public policy
- Arizona State University
- Decision Theater
