= Decision Theater =

Venue at ASU, Tempe, Arizona

- Interactive map of the Decision Theater area

General information
- Type: Research Institute
- Location: Arizona State University: Tempe Campus, 21 E 6th Street, Suite 126A; Tempe, Arizona 85287
- Coordinates: 33°25′26.00″N 111°56′20.25″W
- Owner: Arizona State University

The Decision Theater at Arizona State University is an 8,000-square-foot (740 m^{2}) visualization environment that accommodates up to 30 participants.

The core component of the Decision Theater is the ‘drum’ comprising a 260-degree faceted screen, seven rear-projection passive stereo sources, tracking devices and surround sound. This enables data to be displayed and interacted with in a panoramic setting using 2D or 3D stereoscopic video.

Unlike some visualization labs and flat-wall display facilities, the Decision Theater is an immersive environment designed for collaboration. Participants are often arranged in a conference configuration to improve human engagement with each other and to interact with the visual information around them. They can take advantage of a variety of tools to improve decision making including 3D and geospatial visualization, simulation models, system dynamics, and computer-assisted tools for collecting participant input and collaboration. They also have access to the university’s ongoing research in policy informatics, design, geography, computational science, business, psychology and mathematics.

The facility is used by federal, state and local government agencies, community planners and policy makers in business to address complex problems ranging from hyper growth, and water resource management to disease monitoring. These fall into four domains: Urban growth, Public health, Education, and Environment.

The Decision Theater concept originated in 2005 and reflects the university leadership’s desire to create a different type of visualization center, one focused on issues related to new urbanism, smart growth and sustainability. That vision called for the creation of a space where researchers at the university and community could explore common issues in a neutral setting.

== See also ==
- Arizona State University
- Morrison Institute
