= Business Information Review =

- Discipline: Information management, knowledge management
- Language: English
- Edited by: Claire Laybats, Luke Tredinnick

Publication details
- History: 1984-present
- Publisher: SAGE Publications
- Frequency: Quarterly

Standard abbreviations
- ISO 4: Bus. Inf. Rev.

Indexing
- CODEN: BIREEY
- ISSN: 0266-3821 (print); 1741-6450 (web)
- LCCN: sn86015890
- OCLC no.: 12266742

Links
- Journal homepage; Online access; Online archive

Business Information Review is a quarterly peer-reviewed academic journal that publishes articles on information and knowledge management in organizations. The journal publishes both practitioner and academic papers themed around commercial information management issues. The journal's editors-in-chief are Claire Laybats and Luke Tredinnick. It has been in publication since 1984 and is currently published by SAGE Publications.

Business Information Review is notable for producing the Annual Survey of Business Information, which has been published annually since 1991.

== Abstracting and indexing ==
Business Information Quarterly is abstracted and indexed in:

- ABI/INFORM
- Corporate ResourceNET
- Current Contents/Social and Behavioral Sciences
- Inspec
- Library and Information Science Abstracts
- Scopus
