= Clark Churchill =

American political figure (1836–1896)

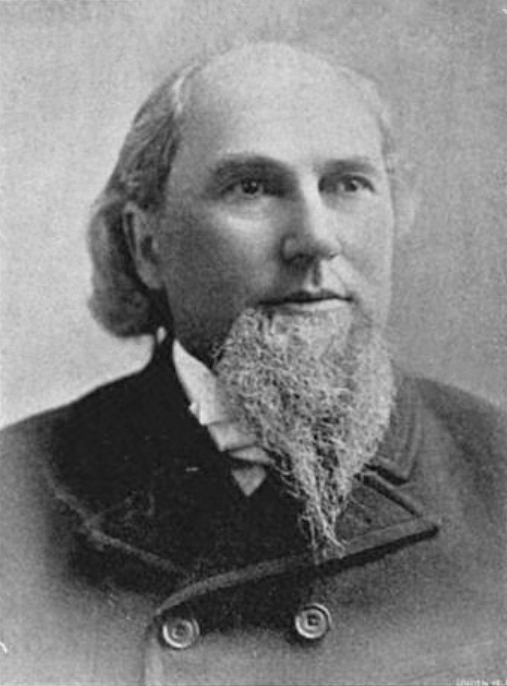
Clark Churchill

Clark Churchill (June 17, 1836 – April 4, 1896) was an attorney and politician in the American territory of Arizona. He is best remembered for having served as the Attorney General of Arizona from 1883 to 1885.

== Biography ==
=== Early years ===
Clark Churchill was born on June 17, 1836, in Tioga County, Pennsylvania to Dr. Charles Churchill and the former Elizabeth Butler. All record of his early years and education is lost.

=== Career ===
Churchill became an attorney in San Francisco in 1861, but his interests soon turned to mining affairs. An interest in the Comstock lode prompted his move to Virginia City, Nevada. He married Margaretha on October 12, 1864.

Churchill's interest in mining affairs proved short-lived and in 1865 he was named Virginia City’s city attorney. He would remain in the post through 1866.

In 1878, Churchill moved to Prescott, where he went into legal practice with Thomas Finch. He would remain with Finch until February 1880.

Churchill was named Adjutant General in Fall 1880. He took an active interest in territorial politics, serving as the chairman of Republican Territorial Committee in 1884.

Governor Frederick A. Tritle signed a bill restoring the office of Attorney General on March 7, 1883. Churchill was appointed to this post on March 8, 1883, becoming the fifth Attorney General of the Arizona Territory. He was renominated on March 5, 1885, and served until March 15, 1887, when he was succeeded by Briggs Goodrich. Churchill's time in office coincided with cowboy problems and widespread fear of Indian attacks. As a result several towns formed new militia units during his time in office.

In addition to his government positions, Churchill served as President of the Arizona Canal Company from 1882 to 1887.

Churchill's first wife died on August 28, 1890. He married Virginia Goodrich on December 30, 1891.

=== Death and legacy ===
Clark Churchill died in Phoenix at 7:40 in the morning of April 4, 1896 of a heart attack. Although doctors had warned of his heart ailment, he appeared to friends to be in excellent health and his sudden death came as a shock to friends and associates. Churchill was 59 years old at the time of his death.
