= Watts College of Public Service and Community Solutions =

Public policy school of Arizona State University

Coordinates: 33°27′9.51″N 112°4′25.4″W

ASU Watts College of Public Service and Community Solutions
- Motto: Engage. Serve. Transform
- Type: Public
- Established: 1979 (as the College of Public Programs)
- Dean: Cynthia Lietz
- Students: 5,525+
- Location: Phoenix, Arizona, United States
- Campus: Arizona State University at the Downtown Phoenix campus
- Website: publicservice.asu.edu
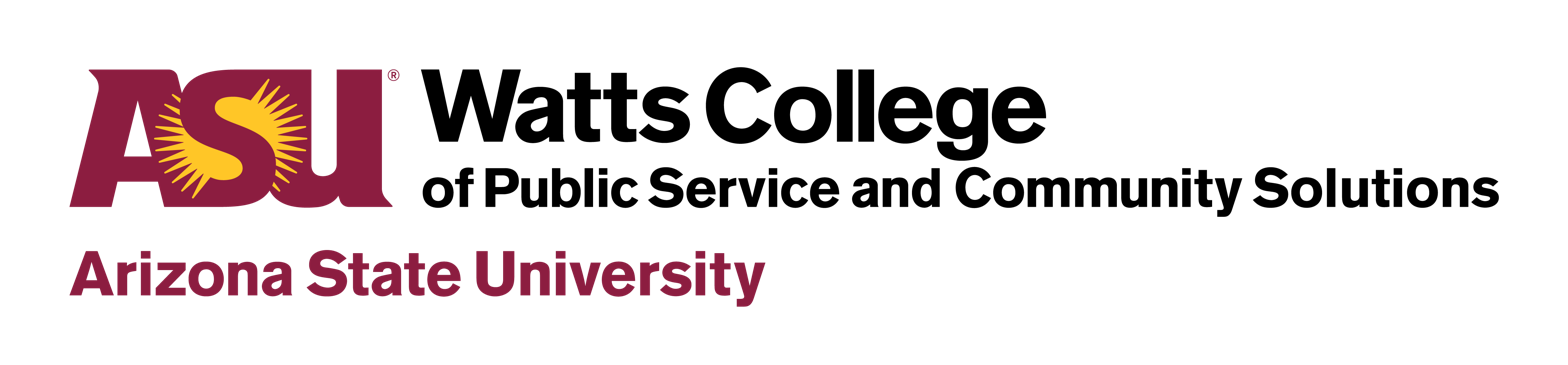

The Watts College of Public Service and Community Solutions (formerly the College of Public Programs) is one of the 24 school units of Arizona State University. It is located at ASU's Downtown Phoenix Campus in Arizona. Founded in 1979, the college awards bachelors, masters, and doctoral degrees and is organized into four schools and 17 research centers. The programs are divided amongst the School of Social Work, the School of Criminology and Criminal Justice, the School of Public Affairs and the School of Community Resources and Development.

== History ==
The College of Public Programs was founded at Arizona State University's Tempe campus on April 21, 1979. The college's establishment was part of the university's reorganization of several departments within other colleges. Effective July 1, 1979, the College of Public Programs housed five academic units:

- The Center for Criminal Justice (Now the School of Criminology & Criminal Justice)
- The Center for Public Affairs (Now the School of Public Affairs)
- The Department of Communication (Now the Hugh Downs School of Human Communication)
- The Department of Journalism and Telecommunications (Now the Walter Cronkite School of Journalism and Mass Communication)
- The Department of Leisure Studies (Now the School of Community Resources and Development)

In 2006, the College of Public Programs relocated from Wilson Hall on the university's Tempe campus to Arizona State University's newly planned Downtown Phoenix campus. On January 1, 2015, The College of Public Programs officially renamed itself to the College of Public Service & Community Solutions. In 2018, the college was titled the Watts College of Public Service and Community Solutions following a donation of $30 million by business owners Mike and Cindy Watts.

ASU's College of Public Service & Community Solutions has a number of distinguished divisions and research centers, including the Lodestar Center for Philanthropy and Nonprofit Innovation, the Morrison Institute for Public Policy and the Southwest Interdisciplinary Research Center.

== Schools ==
School of Community Resources and Development

The School of Community Resources & Development (SCRD) at Arizona State University offers undergraduate, graduate and doctoral programs in nonprofit leadership and management, parks and recreation management, tourism development and management, and more.

The early recreation program at Arizona State University was developed and housed in the Department of Health, Physical Education, Recreation and Dance. In 1979, the program was invited to join the new College of Public Programs, where it became the Department of Leisure Studies. During the 1980s, both the tourism and nonprofit management academic areas were added to the department's traditional focus on parks and recreation. The department changed its name to the Department of Recreation Management and Tourism in 1994. In July 2004, the department was elevated to school status and renamed the School of Community Resources and Development.

School of Criminology and Criminal Justice

The School of Criminology and Criminal Justice (CCJ) at Arizona State University offers the degrees of Bachelor of Science in Criminology and Criminal Justice, Master of Science and Doctor of Philosophy in the field of Criminology and Criminal Justice. Starting in 2010, the school also offers an online Master of Arts in Criminal Justice.

Research areas include criminal justice policy, effects of race/ethnicity and gender on sentencing decisions, fraud victimization, gender & crime, gangs, community policing, juvenile court processes, prisoner reentry and reintegration and sentencing policies.

School of Public Affairs

The School of Public Affairs (SPA) at Arizona State University offers undergraduate, graduate and doctoral degrees in the field of public administration and policy.

School of Social Work

The School of Social Work (SSW) at Arizona State University offers undergraduate, graduate and doctoral degrees in the field of social work.

The programs prepare professional social workers for beginning-level generalist practice (BSW), and for advanced practice (MSW) in one of the following specializations: health or behavioral health, children, youth and families, public child welfare, planning, administration and community practice. Its Ph.D. program prepares social work scholars and educators for positions in research, evaluation and social work education. The School of Social Work also offers its BSW and MSW programs in Tucson, Arizona.

== Notable faculty ==
Kevin Desouza, associate professor in the School of Public Affairs and associate dean for research at the College of Public Service & Community Solutions. Desouza authored, co-authored, and/or edited nine books, the most recent being Intrapraneurship: Managing Ideas within Your Organization. His work has also been featured by Sloan Management Review, Harvard Business Review and Businessweek.

U.S. Senator Kyrsten Sinema has been an adjunct instructor in the School of Social Work since 2003. Sinema received her Master of Social Work from Arizona State University in 1999.

== Rankings ==
The School of Criminology & Criminal Justice at Arizona State University is one of the top-ranked graduate criminology programs in the U.S., ranked #2 overall by U.S. News & World Report. Its online graduate Criminal Justice program is ranked 7th in the nation in the rankings of online graduate programs by U.S. News & World Report.

The School of Criminology & Criminal Justice began offering its online degree programs in fall 2010 and now enrolls more than 500 students in its bachelor's and master's degree programs.

According to U.S. News & World Report, the School of Public Affairs at Arizona State University is ranked 2nd in the nation among programs focused on city management and urban policy.
