= Malayan High School of Science =

Private high school in Manila, Philippines

Location
- Paz M. Guazon St., Pandacan; Manila, Metro Manila; Philippines
- Coordinates: 14°35′30″N 120°59′55″E

Information
- Type: Private, non-sectarian, run by the Mapua Institute of Technology / Malayan Colleges, Inc. of the Yuchengco Group of Companies
- Motto: Imagine. Create. Exceed.
- Established: June 5, 2005
- Founder: Dr. Reynaldo B. Vea
- President: Dr. Reynaldo B. Vea
- Chairman: Helen Y. Dee
- Principal: Venice Christine C. Dangaran
- Grades: 7 to 10
- Enrollment: approximately 400
- Campus: Urban, 1 hectare
- Colors: Blue & White
- Nickname: Malayans
- Newspaper: Whizzy Works
- Alma Mater song: Malayan Hymn
- Website: www.malayanscience.edu.ph

The Malayan High School of Science (MHSS) is a private secondary educational institution established in 2005. It is managed and operated by the Mapúa University (MU). It is on a one-hectare property along P. Guazon Street (formerly Otis St.) in the district of Pandacan, Manila, Philippines.

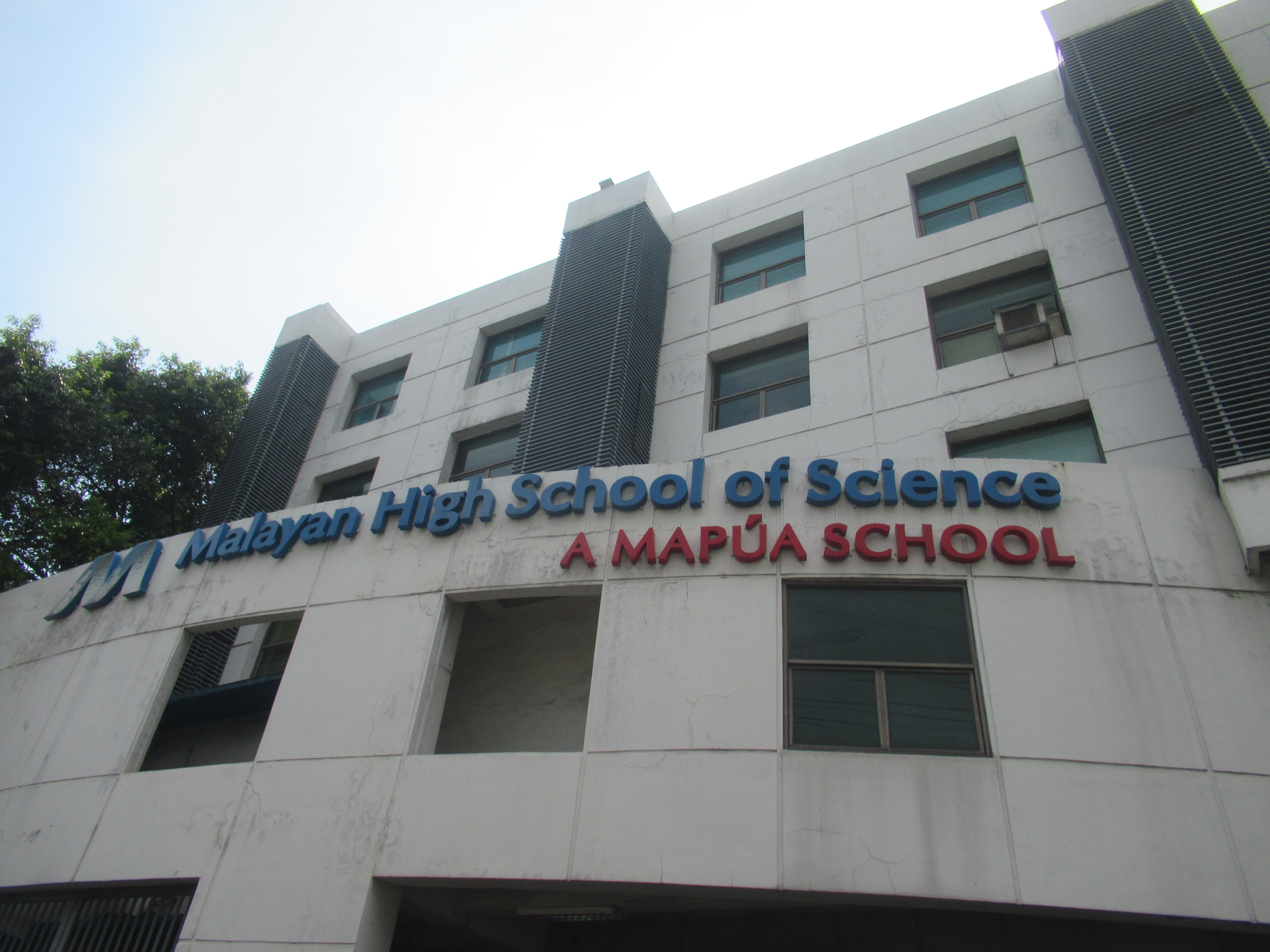
Facade

== History ==
The inauguration of MHSS was held on January 16, 2006, with then Manila Mayor Lito Atienza as guest speaker and MIT chairman Alfonso T. Yuchengco, former Senate president Jovito Salonga, former Prime Minister Cesar Virata, and Yuchengco Group of Companies (YGC) chairperson Helen Y. Dee in attendance.

The school opened its doors to 312 freshmen students and formally launched its first year of operation on June 14, 2006 under the administration of president, Dr. Reynaldo B. Vea, who is also the president of MIT.

== Accreditation ==
MHSS is accredited by the Mathematics Teachers Association of the Philippines (MTAP) to be the only mathematics review center for Grade 6 and high school students in Manila.

== Curriculum ==
Updated as of December 2017

SUBJECT	GRADE 7	GRADE 8	GRADE 9	GRADE 10
SCIENCE	Integrated Science			
MATHEMATICS	Integrated Mathematics			
ICT	Basic Computer and Applications	CSS and Basic Programming	Multimedia Arts	
ENGLISH	Communication Arts			
RESEARCH	does not apply			Research 1
FILIPINO	Sining ng Komunikasyon			
SOCIAL STUDIES	Asian History	World History	Economics	Contemporary Issues
MAPEH	Music, Arts, Physical Education and Health 7	Music, Arts, Physical Education and Health 8	Music, Arts, Physical Education and Health 9	Music, Arts, Physical Education and Health 10; Citizenship Advancement Training
VALUES EDUCATION	Values Education 7	Values Education 8	Values Education 9	Values Education 10
ADDITIONAL SUBJECTS	Science 7A (Selected Topics in Science); Math 7A (Selected Topics in Mathematics); Technology Skills 7 (Robotics); TS7A (Drawing and Drafting)	Science 8A (Selected Topics in Science); Math 8A (Selected Topics in Mathematics); Technology Skills 8 (Robotics); TS8A (AutoCad)	Science 9A (Selected Topics in Science); Math 9A (Selected Topics in Mathematics); Technology Skills 9 (Robotics); TS9A (Basic Electronics)	Science 10A (Selected Topics in Science); Math 10A (Selected Topics in Mathematics); Technology Skills 10 (Robotics); TS10A (Advanced Programming)

== Student organizations ==
- The Eco Warriors Club advocates a "greener" school through tree-planting activities, ecological seminars and the like.
- Malayan Kasaysayan is the official Social Sciences association of MHSS. The club organizes activities related to geography, history, politics, and other general social sciences that are relevant to the development of the school, country, and the global society.
- The Math, Science, and Technology Society, also known as MaSciTech, provides a regular venue for MHSS students to express their extracurricular interests in the fields of math, science and technology. Members of this club compete in interschool quizzes and competitions.
- The MusikaMalayan is the official school choir. This club aims to hone the students' skills in music.
- The Peer Counselors are the right hand of the Center for Guidance and Counseling. They offer peer help and advice and act as ambassadors of goodwill on campus. This club is established to interact and reach out to Malayans, to touch lives and bring hope — enlighten minds that there are changes to be embraced
- The Sports Organization organizes all sports-related activities of the school. This club aims to develop/ harness potential MHSS students in athletic endeavor and enhance their social skills through actual participation in Intramurals provided by the School
- The Supreme Student Government serves as the governing body for students at MHSS. The SSG represents the student body to the faculty and administration of MHSS, and represents the school in outside events and activities.
- Whizzy Works is the official publication of MHSS, run by the students. It covers and documents all the important events MHSS is involved in on and off campus.
