= Walter Cronkite School of Journalism and Mass Communication =

Part of the Arizona State University

Coordinates: 33°27′13.7304″N 112°4′23.6604″W

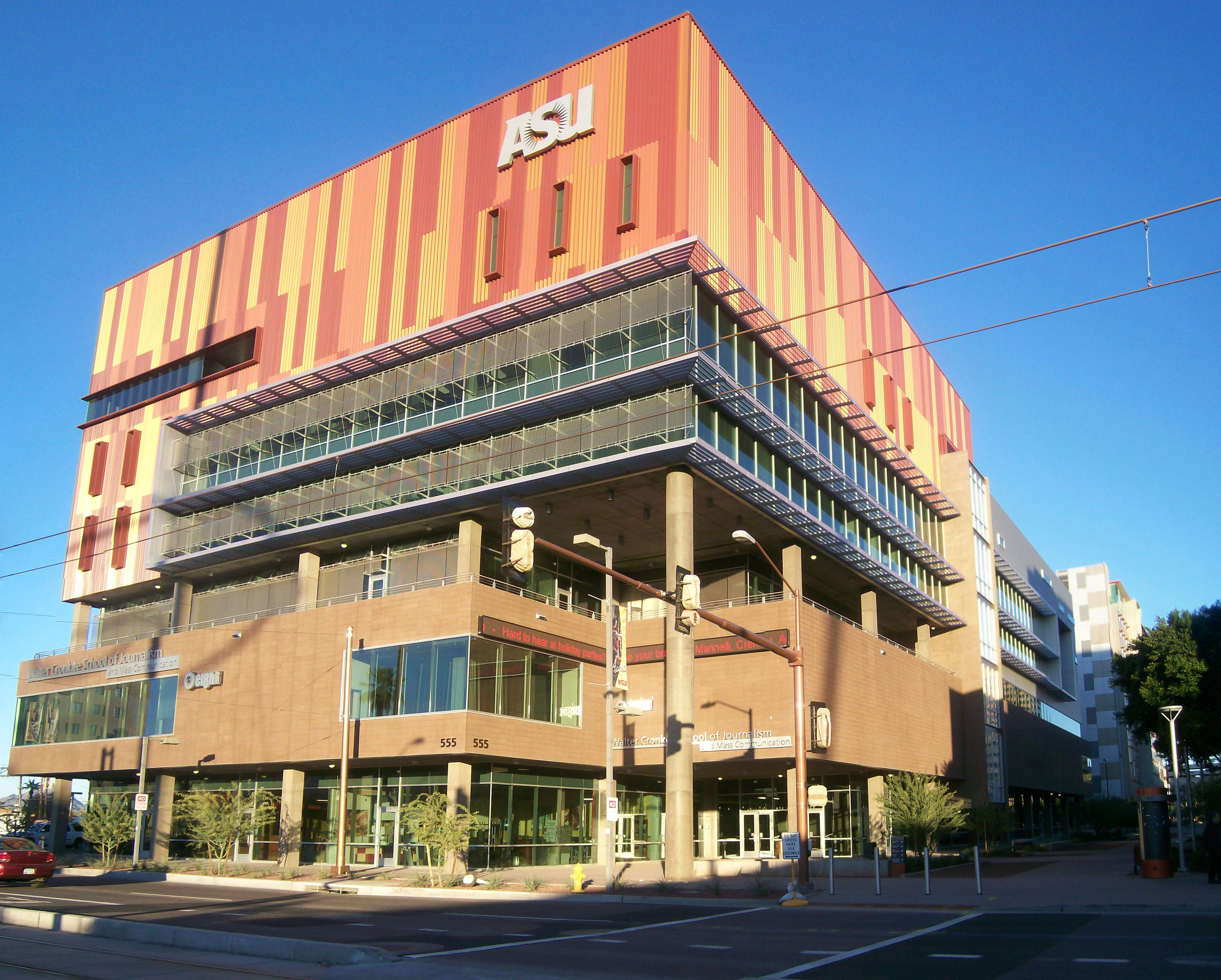
- The Cronkite School as seen from Central Avenue
- Type: Public
- Established: 1941 (as ASU English Department – Division of Journalism)
- Dean: Battinto Batts Jr.
- Faculty: 186
- Students: 2100
- Location: Phoenix, Arizona, United States
- Campus: Arizona State University
- Website: cronkite.asu.edu

The Walter Cronkite School of Journalism and Mass Communication (often abbreviated to The Cronkite School by its students and faculty), is one of the 24 independent schools at Arizona State University and is named in honor of veteran broadcast journalist Walter Cronkite. The school, which is located at the downtown Phoenix campus, offers several undergraduate and graduate programs in journalism, and in fall 2011, launched its first doctoral program in journalism and mass communication.

== History ==
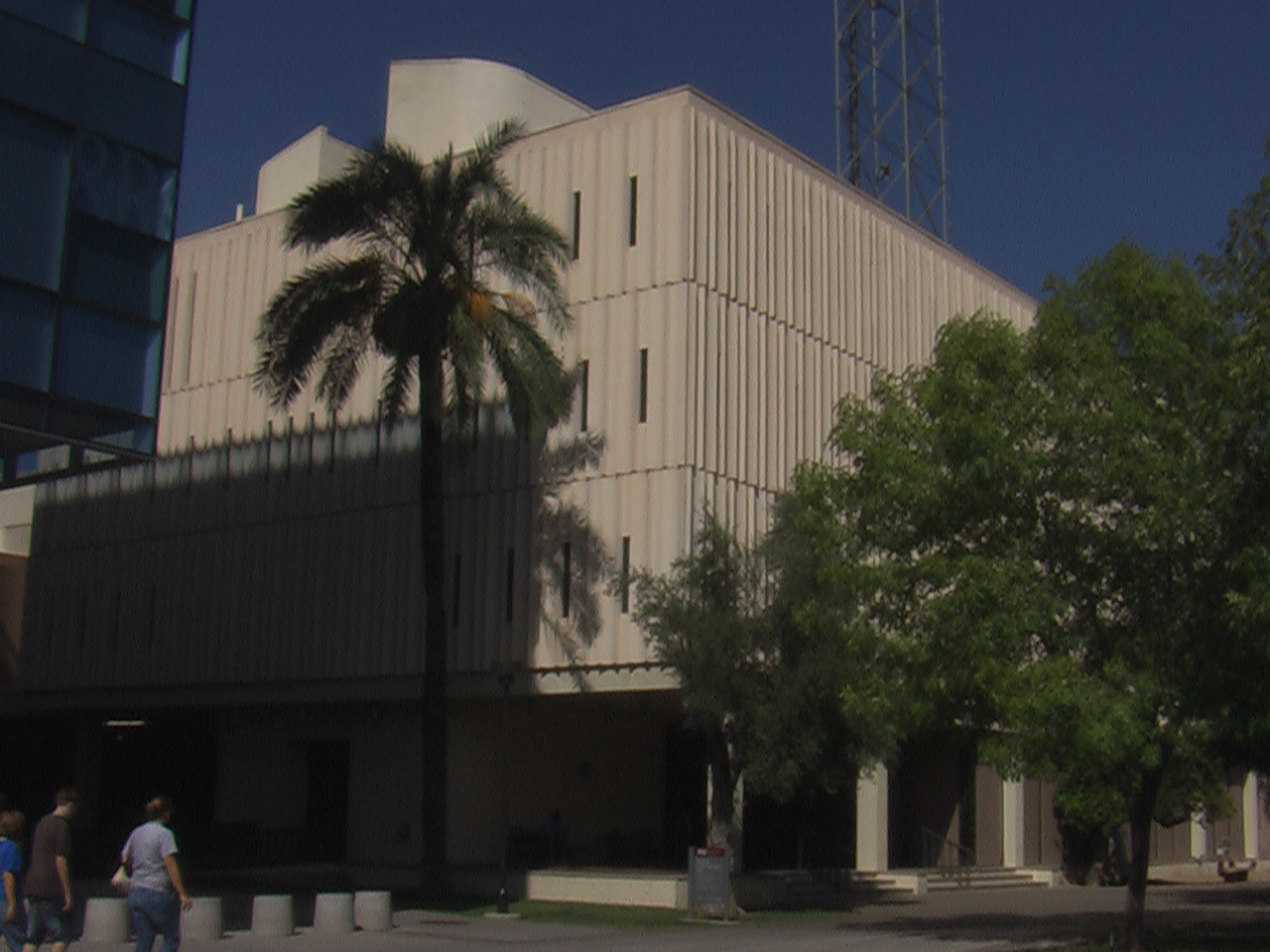
Stauffer Hall, the former home of the Cronkite School

The Cronkite School began as the Division of Journalism under the ASU's English Department in 1949, 18 years after ASU began to offer journalism courses to its students, in 1931. The school began to expand in 1954, when radio and television journalism courses were made available. The entire Division of Journalism was elevated to department by the university in 1957, and changed its name to Department of Mass Communication. The school moved from its original location at Old Main to what is now the Academic Services building at ASU Tempe in 1969.

In 1974 the school received its national accreditation and moved into the Stauffer Hall building. The school was later renamed Department of Journalism and Telecommunication and became a part of the new College of Public Programs in 1979. Stauffer Hall would serve as the school's home until August 2008, when the school moved to its current location in downtown Phoenix.

In 1981, the Cronkite School began to offer master's degrees. A year later, the school established a student radio station, Blaze Radio, as a place for prospective students to mature their skills. (The State Press used to fulfill that role, but it became independent in the 1970s.) In 1984, the school was renamed Walter Cronkite School of Journalism and Telecommunication in honor of the veteran news reporter. At the same time, the Walter Cronkite Award for Journalism Excellence was established.

In 1989, a professional news program produced by the school's students began production, and later evolved into the well-known Cronkite NewsWatch TV news program.

In 2001, the school voted to change its name to Walter Cronkite School of Journalism and Mass Communication. The school received independent school status in 2004. It chose Christopher Callahan as its founding dean in 2005. A year later, the school established the Cronkite News Service, enabling advanced journalism students to distribute TV and print stories to various professional media.

When the Cronkite School received independent school status in 2004, plans were made to transfer the school to a newly planned campus in Downtown Phoenix. In 2008, the school moved to the new Cronkite Building on ASU's downtown campus. The building has six stories, is 110 feet (34 m) tall, and has an area of 223,000 square feet (20,700 m^{2}). The building, which also houses the studio of the Valley's PBS member station, KAET, cost $71 million to build. Six years later, KAET was transferred to the Cronkite School's umbrella.

In 2010, the Cronkite Building won an International Architecture Award. The award was presented and exhibited at 'The City and The World conference' in Spain, from November 4–7, 2010.

In May 2021, the School announced that Dr. Battinto Batts Jr. was selected to replace Callahan as dean.

== New campus ==
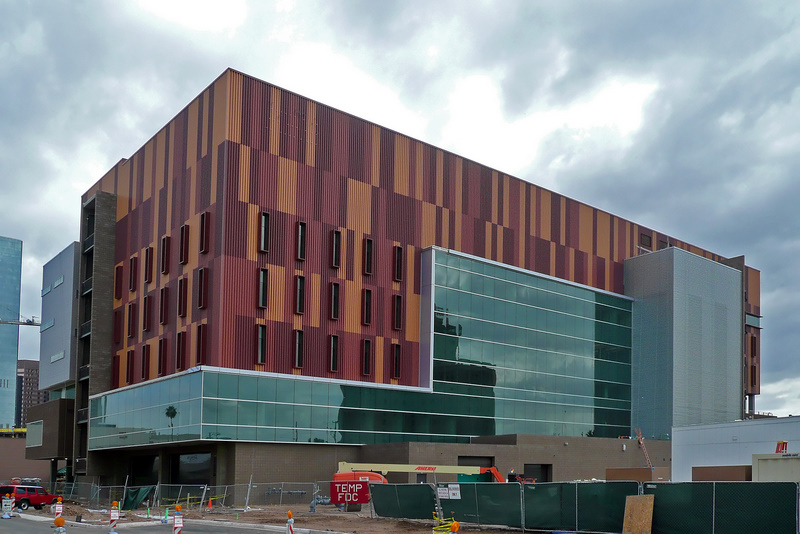
The current building at the ASU Downtown Campus while under construction in May 2008

A ground-breaking ceremony was held in early 2007, with construction being completed in mid-2008. The school moved into its facility in downtown Phoenix in August 2008, then dedicated the new building in November of that year.

The six-story, 225,000 sqft, 110-foot tall, LEED Silver building has become an integral part of the fabric of ASU's downtown campus. Delivered in a design-build, fast-track method, work began on design in October 2006 and the school opened its doors in August 2008, only 22 months later. The new building was designed by HDR, Inc. Sundt Construction was responsible for construction.

== Faculty ==
A few notable faculty are:

- Retired Washington Post editor Leonard Downie Jr.,
- Dr. B. William Silcock,
- Former Vice President for Content for BET Interactive Retha Hill,
- Longtime media executive Mi-Ai Parrish,
- Noted American technology writer and former San Jose Mercury News-columnist Dan Gillmor,
- Former editor of the Minneapolis Star Tribune Tim McGuire,
- Veteran award-winning sports journalist Kathy Kudravi,
- Eric Newton, a former executive of the John S. and James L. Knight Foundation.

Walter Cronkite was not a faculty member, but visited the campus a few times a year to interact with students and present the Cronkite Award. The school has moved away from the traditional academic structure of hiring only tenured professors. In addition it hires veteran journalists like Downie and Gillmor to be professors of practice and also draws practicing journalists from the Phoenix area as adjuncts who teach many of its courses.

== Cronkite News ==
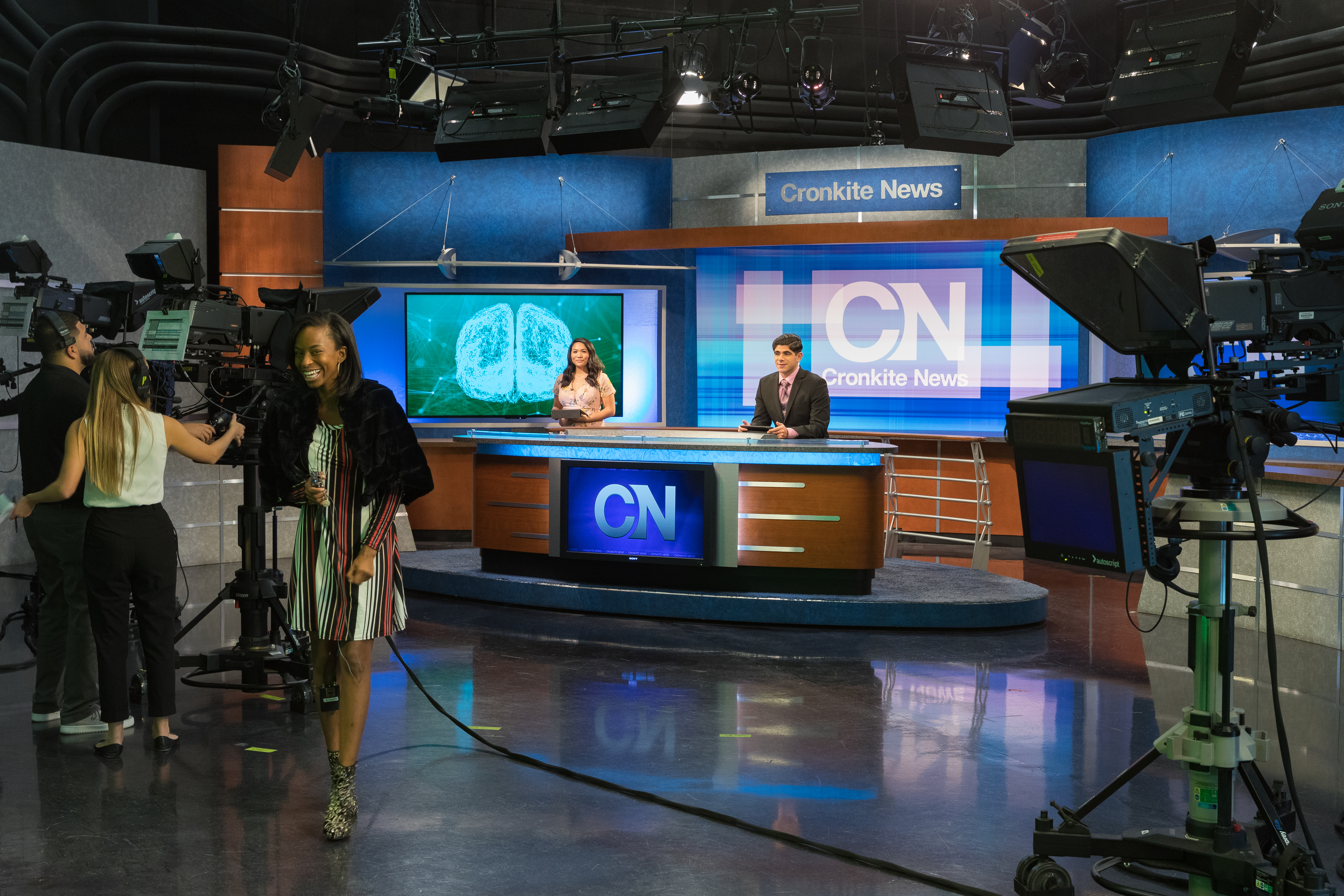
Recording of Cronkite News in November 2018

Cronkite News is the nightly thirty-minute news program produced entirely by students at the Cronkite School and began in 1989. The program airs five nights a week on the local PBS affiliate KAET at 5 pm.

Cronkite News en Español is the Spanish-language edition of the program which airs Sunday mornings on the local Telefutura affiliate KFPH-CA, a sister station of the local Univision station.

When the school moved into its new downtown facility, Cronkite News began broadcasting the nightly news program entirely in high definition and moved into a new studio on the sixth floor of the building — housing a new set and control room designed for high definition. A traditional three-camera format is used at the anchor desk, weather center, and one of the largest green screens — all of which back onto a working newsroom, assignment desk, and an outdoor terrace for live reports.

The program airs stories from the school's Cronkite News Service — a broadcast wire service that provides its content to local print, online, and broadcast news outlets across Arizona.

== Programs ==
The Cronkite School houses the national headquarters of the News21 Initiative, the Howard Center for Investigative Journalism, the Knight Center for Digital Media Entrepreneurship, the National Center on Disability and Journalism and the Donald W. Reynolds National Center for Business Journalism. The Cronkite School recently made its programs available to online students.

== News Co/Lab ==
News Co/Lab is an initiative to elevate news literacy and awareness, providing resources for verifying Reliable Sources. Dan Gillmor is director.

== Student media and other activities ==
Cronkite Students have traditionally served as primary members of each of Arizona State University's student media divisions, particularly State Press and Blaze Radio ASU.

Cronkite Students also serve as reporters for the university-independent Downtown Devil.

== See also ==
- Campus radio
- List of college radio stations in the United States
