= Mapúa Malayan Colleges Laguna =

Private college in Laguna, Philippines

- Former name: Malayan Colleges Laguna (2006–2023)
- Motto: Excellence and Virtue
- Type: Private, research, nonsectarian university
- Established: January 23, 2006; 20 years ago
- Founder: Tomás Bautista Mapúa
- Parent institution: iPeople Inc. (under Yunchengco Group of Companies)
- Accreditation: LEED • PACU • PTC-ACBET • PICAB • AUN-CA
- Academic affiliations: ASU-Cintana Alliance • BCA • SEAMEO • UMAP
- Chairperson: Helen Y. Dee
- President: Dodjie S. Maestrecampo
- Location: Pulo–Diezmo Road, Barangay Diezmo, Cabuyao, Laguna, Philippines; 14°14′36″N 121°06′46″E
- Campus: 6 ha (60,000 m^{2})
- Newspaper: KAMALAYAN
- Colors: Navy blue/silver & Red/white
- Nickname: Wizards/Mages
- Mascots: Whizzy & Dash
- Website: mcl.edu.ph

- Location in Laguna Location in Luzon Location in the Philippines

Mapúa Malayan Colleges Laguna (Mapúa MCL) is a private research and nonsectarian college wholly owned subsidiary of the Mapúa University in Cabuyao, Laguna, Philippines. Founded in January 23, 2006, the college was established by the Mapúa University to bring its renowned engineering, maritime, and technological education to Southern Luzon. A branch in Davao named Mapúa Malayan Colleges Mindanao was established in 2018, marking the official start of the institutions' operations in Mindanao.

Mapúa MCL offers 9 undergraduate programs, including two modified by its collaboration with Arizona State University (ASU). The institution’s location relative to Cabuyao's industrial sector provides students with significant opportunities for industry immersion and professional development at established corporations. Mapúa MCL achieved autonomous status in 2019, 13 years after its establishment, making it the youngest college in the country to attain this recognition. It has had a string of successes over the years which include 100% passing rates in several licensure and certification examinations, and the high employment rates of graduates – all of which have helped Mapúa MCL secure its ranking as the 3rd HEI (higher educational institution) in Calabarzon.

== History ==
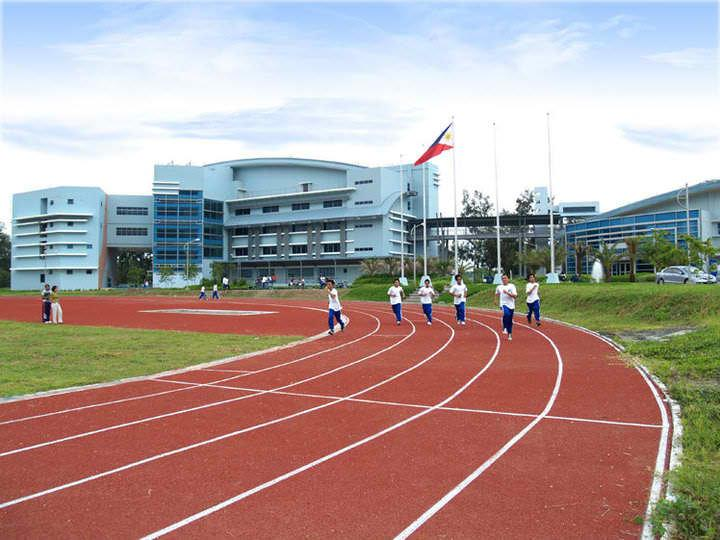
Mapúa MCL campus from 2006, with Rizal Hall in the background

College seal from 2013 to 2023

=== Initial years ===
In 1999, when the Yuchengco Group of Companies (YGC), led by the esteemed Ambassador Alfonso T. Yuchengco, took ownership of the Mapúa Institute of Technology (now Mapúa University), significant efforts were made to enhance the institution's academic programs and facilities.

Through the years, new programs such as Computer Science, Information Technology, Material Science and Engineering, Biotechnology, Nursing, Psychology, Accountancy, and Hotel and Restaurant Management have been added to Mapúa's offering of Engineering and Architecture programs. In fulfillment of the long-term development plan of Mapúa, a six-hectare land was acquired for its expansion and presence in Laguna, which stands as one of Calabarzon's industrial and commercial hubs.

Groundwork started in late 2005, and on January 23, 2006, Malayan Colleges Laguna (MCL) acquired its corporate personality following its registration with the Securities and Exchange Commission. The school began its operations with more than 860 freshmen students in its inaugural year.

In November 2006, the Commission on Higher Education (CHED) granted approval to MCL to offer eight programs in the fields of Engineering, Information Technology, and Business. This came after Mapúa MCL successfully met the standards set by CHED's Regional Quality Assurance Team. Three (3) colleges were initially established under the Mapúa Institute of Technology at Laguna (MITL), the E.T. Yuchengco College of Business (ETYCB), and the College of Information Technology, which was later renamed as the College of Computer and Information Science (CCIS). The College of Arts and Science (CAS) and the Mapúa-PTC College of Maritime Education and Training (Mapúa-PTC CMET) were eventually added, followed by the Institute for Excellence in Continuing Education and Lifelong Learning (I-ExCELL).

In 2014, MCL received the seal of approval for its Maritime Programs from the Belgian Maritime Inspectorate (BMI).

In 2015, MCL's engineering programs were accredited by the Philippine Technological Council (PTC) through its Accreditation and Certification Board for Engineering and Technology (ACBET).

In 2016, MCL established and opened the MCL Senior High School, its response to the implementation of K-12 in basic education. To shelter the institution's growing community, a building named after Albert Einstein was constructed, named after the scientist who, in his lifetime's work, exuded MCL's motto: Excellence and Virtue.

In 2019, MCL was granted Autonomous Status through CHED Memorandum Order No. 12, Series of 2019. It also became an official member of the Philippine Association of Colleges and Universities.

In 2023, the Securities and Exchange Commission approved the rebrand of Malayan Colleges Laguna (MCL) to Mapúa Malayan Colleges Laguna (Mapúa MCL).

In 2024, Mapúa MCL started to offer Bachelor of Science in Aeronautical Engineering and Associate in Aircraft Maintenance Technology under the newly established Mapúa-Laguna Institute of Aviation (MIA). College of Nursing (CN) was also added, with the institute offering Bachelor of Science degrees in Medical Technology, Pharmacy, and Physical Therapy in partnership with Arizona State University.

=== Future ===
To accommodate and create hands-on learning for students under the Mapúa-Laguna Institute of Aviation (MIA), Mapúa MCL has recently proposed the construction of a new facility named after Leonardo da Vinci. Construction is projected for completion by 2025.

== Academics ==
=== Undergraduate programs ===
Mapúa MCL offers college education in the fields of engineering, architecture, aviation, business, health sciences, information technology, the arts, and maritime education. Two of these programs have been modified through the ASU collaboration, and the college also offers one graduate program. The institution operates on a trimester system, following a 14-week term with the implementation of the Mapúa MCL Flux learning approach.

=== Teaching ===
The institution's learning approach, known as MCL Flexible Learning Ubiquitous Experience (Mapúa MCL FLUX), blends face-to-face and online learning. Each class session and activity is available in-person, through live online sessions, and asynchronously online, allowing students to choose how they want to participate for each class or activity. This method provides students with three learning options: face-to-face, synchronous, and asynchronous sessions.

Mapúa MCL FLUX allows Mapúa Malayan Colleges Laguna (Mapúa MCL) to respond flexibly to public health challenges and disruption from natural calamities without sacrificing learning objectives. The students can be able to make the same progress toward their degree even if in-campus instruction is interrupted. Every class offered in Mapúa MCL will be in the Flux format, with students freely shifting from one mode to another whenever they prefer. However, as of 2026, this format is currently not yet being fully integrated. Instead, the institution continues to utilize fixed instructional modalities, specifically designated online or face-to-face learning. This limits the availability of class sessions in both face-to-face and online, making the FLUX approach ineffective.

Mapúa MCL also operates the Mapúa Malayan Digital College (MMDC), which is also based in Cabuyao, Laguna, and has two learning hubs outside Laguna: one in Quezon City (Luzon Hub) and one in Bacolod City (VisMin Hub).

=== Rankings and reputation ===
University rankings

Global – Overall
- QS World: 3/5 (2024)
- QS Employability: 5/5 (2024)
- THE World: 1501+ (2024)
- WURI Global: 91st (2024)

Over the years, Mapúa has achieved consistency in getting notable remarks on Times Higher Education (THE) Impact Rankings, Quacquarelli Symonds (QS) Rating System, and World University Rankings for Innovation (WURI). In 2024, Mapúa MCL in Times Higher Education (THE) Impact Rankings acquired a 1501+ ranking out of the 2,152 institutions evaluated. Having first earned an overall rating of 3 Stars from the UK-based Quacquarelli Symonds (QS) Star Rating System in 2020, it once again earned 3 QS Stars, along with 5 QS stars in the Employability, Online Learning, and Social Responsibility categories in 2024.

In 2022, Mapúa MCL was recognized as CALABARZON's first school to receive ISO 21001:2018 – EOMS certification. This certification confirms that Mapúa MCL's Educational Organizations Management System, which incorporates its program offerings, complies with the latest ISO 21001:2018 standards.

Additionally, students from Mapúa MCL's B.S. Architecture program became the first in Southeast Asia to be accredited as Leadership in Energy and Environmental Design (LEED) Green Associates by the U.S. Green Building Council (USGBC), with Mapúa MCL being the country's first and only current USGBC Gold Member.

In 2025, Mapúa MCL attained Tier 1 Institution classification for engineering from the Philippine Technological Council (PTC), implying that the institution has met the required thresholds for all three criteria of the PTC Tier Classification System (TCS). Furthermore, under the conditions of the Washington Accord, all seven of the school's engineering programs will be included in the Federation of Engineering Institutions of Asia and the Pacific (FEIAP) register of accredited programs, in full compliance with the FEIAP Guidelines for Engineering Education.

== Student activities ==
=== Activities ===
The institution provides a diverse array of activities and events that cater to various college departments, student organizations, undergraduate programs, and senior high school levels. These initiatives aim to showcase students’ talents and skills in areas such as arts, sports, music, and other fields.

Notable annual events include the Mapúa MCL Wizards Tournament, a sports festival where college students represent their respective departments in various competitions. For high school students, the Mapúa MCL Cup is an interschool competition that provides a platform to test and showcase their knowledge, technological expertise, and artistic abilities among several other participating institutions. Other highly anticipated events include College Weeks and the institution’s Foundation Week, which celebrate community spirit and student achievements.

=== Student government and media ===
The Mapúa MCL Supreme Student Council (SSC) serves as the representative body of the school's undergraduate leaders, playing a key role in organizing and overseeing school events and activities. The officials are appointed with partial meritocratic process, rather than through full democratic elections due to the uneven number of voters across various disciplines.

For the official student multimedia journalism, KAMALAYAN is the platform and editorial guild of Mapúa MCL. It serves as the institution's primary outlet for student newsletters and magazines, releasing termly newsletters and year-in-review publications.
