= Softcore pornography =

Erotic still photography or film that is not sexually explicit

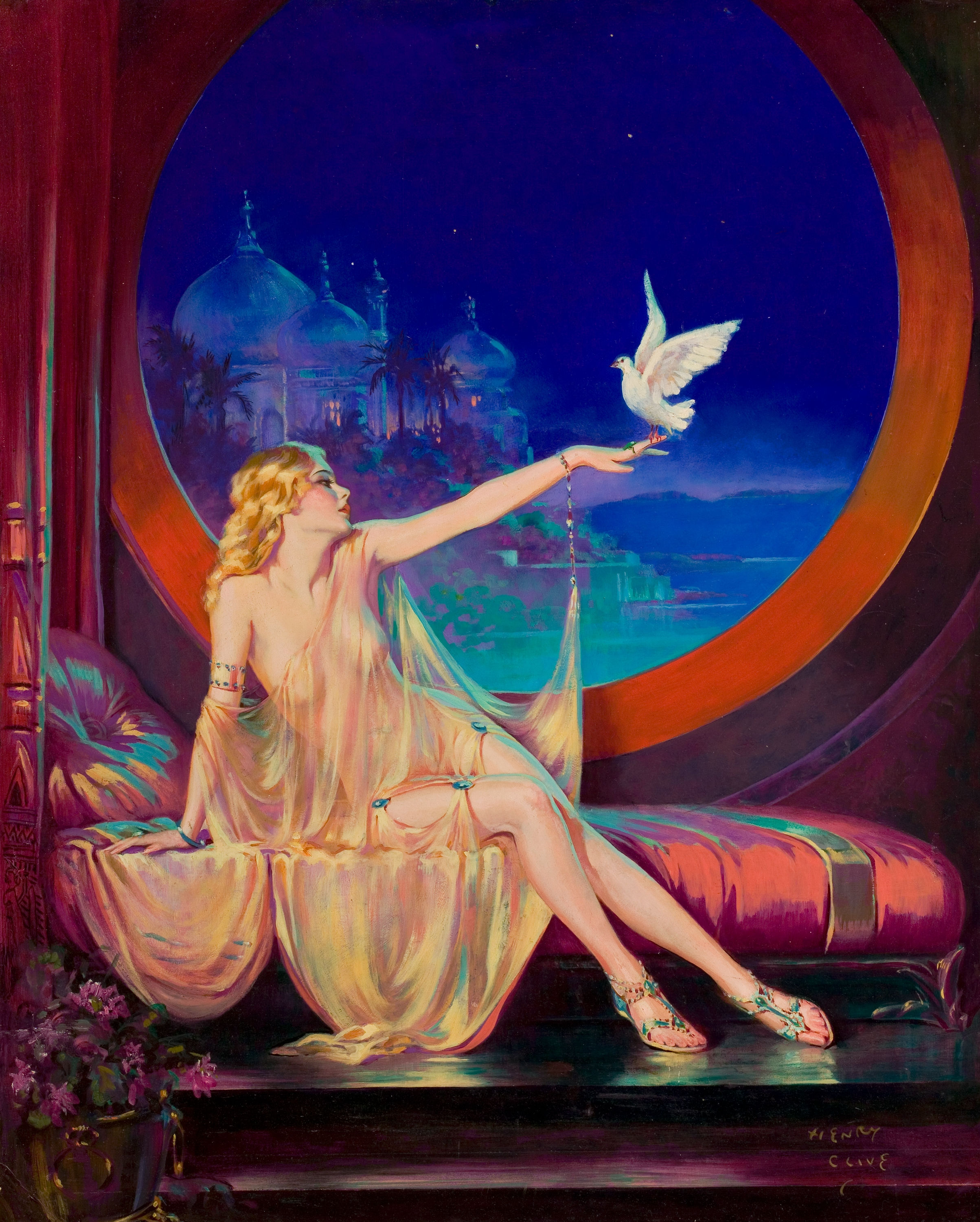
Sultana by Henry Clive. The engraving shows depiction of a woman dressed in a transparent cloth featuring nudity, as is common in softcore pornography.

Softcore pornography or softcore porn is commercial still photography, film, imagery, text or audio content that has a pornographic or erotic component but which is less sexually explicit than hardcore pornography, lacking sexual penetration and other sexual activities. It typically contains nude or semi-nude models or actors in suggestive poses or scenes, and is intended to be sexually arousing and visually appealing in an aesthetic sense.

The distinction between softcore pornography and erotic photography, or erotic art such as Vargas girl pin-ups, is largely a matter of debate. When the subject is naked, the image must be differentiated from nude art, and photos belong within the broader category of nude photography.

== Components ==
Softcore pornography may include sexual activity between two people or masturbation. It does not contain explicit depictions of sexual penetration, cunnilingus, fellatio, fingering, handjobs, or ejaculation. Depictions of erections of the penis may not be allowed, although attitudes towards this are ever-changing.

Commercial pornography can be differentiated from erotica, which has high-art standards and aspirations.

Portions of an image that are considered too graphic may be hidden or obscured in a variety of ways, as by hair or clothing, intentionally-positioned hands or other body parts, artfully located foreground elements such as plants, pillows, furniture, or drapery, or by carefully chosen camera angles.

Pornographic filmmakers sometimes make both hardcore and softcore versions of a given film, with the softcore version using less explicit views of sex scenes or using other techniques to tone down any objectionable features. For example, the softcore version of a given film may have been edited for the in-house hotel pay-per-view market.

Total nudity is currently commonplace in several magazines, as well as in photography and on the Internet.

== Regulation and censorship ==
Softcore films are commonly less regulated and restricted than hardcore pornography, and cater to a different market. In most countries, softcore films are eligible for movie ratings, usually on a restricted rating, though many such films are also released unrated. As with hardcore films, availability of softcore films varies depending on local laws. Also, the exhibition of such films may be restricted to those above a certain age, typically 18. At least one country, Germany, has different age limits for hardcore and softcore pornography, softcore material usually receives a FSK-16 rating (no one under 16 is allowed to buy) and hardcore material receiving a FSK-18 (no one under 18 allowed to buy). In some countries, broadcasting of softcore films is widespread on cable television networks, with some such as Cinemax producing their own in-house softcore films and television series.

In some countries, images of women's genitals are digitally manipulated so that they are not too "detailed". An Australian pornographic actress says that images of her own genitals sold to pornographic magazines in different countries are digitally manipulated to change the size and shape of the labia according to censorship standards in different countries.

== History ==
Originally, softcore pornography was presented mainly in the form of men's magazines, in both still photos and art drawings (such as Vargas girls), when it was barely acceptable to show a glimpse of a woman's nipple in the 1950s. By the 1970s, mainstream magazines such as Playboy, Penthouse, and especially Hustler showcased nudity.

After the formation of the MPAA rating system in the United States and prior to the 1980s, numerous softcore films, with a wide range of production costs, were released to mainstream movie theatres, especially drive-ins. Emmanuelle and Alice in Wonderland received positive reviews from noted critics such as Roger Ebert.

== See also ==
- Ecchi – Japanese term for playful sexual actions
- Erotic photography – Art photography using erotica, and sexually suggestive appeals
- Fan service – Parts of a fictional work intended to please the audience
- Sexploitation film – Genre of independently produced, low-budget feature films
