= Vicky Lane =

Irish-American actress

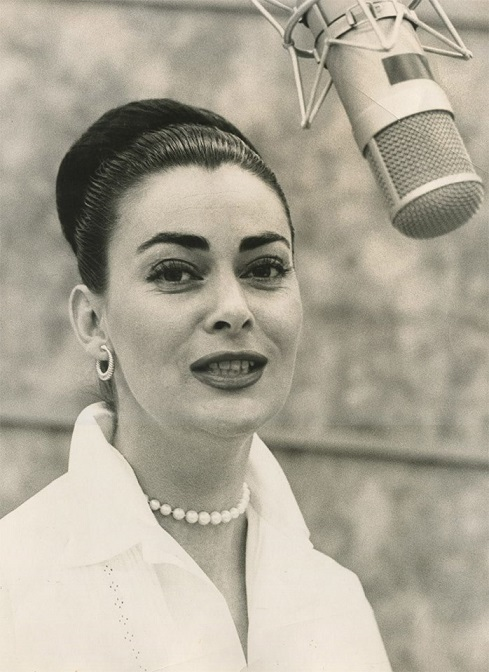
- Lane records the "I Swing For You" album
- Born: Grace Patricia Rose Coghlan; April 23, 1926; Dublin, Ireland
- Died: August 1, 1983 (aged 57); Broward County, Florida, US
- Citizenship: United States
- Spouses: Tom Neal (m. 1948; div. 1949) Pete Candoli (m. 1953; div. 1958)

Vicky Lane (born Grace Patricia Rose Coghlan (April 23, 1926 – August 1, 1983) was an Irish-American film actress who also worked as a singer.

== Life and work ==
Lane first went to Mexico with her family, then to the United States. As a teenager, her first Hollywood role was in 1942. She became known for her role as the Ape Woman Paula Dupree in the horror film The Jungle Captive (1945, directed by Harold Young), a role she took over from Acquanetta, who had played the character in two previous instalments of Universal's Ape Woman film series. It was followed by supporting roles in films such as The Cisco Kid Returns (1945) and later appearances in TV series such as Dad's Army, in 'The Day the Balloon went Up', (1969), as the girl on the tandem.

After a brief marriage to film actor Tom Neal (1948–49), Lane married jazz musician and bandleader Pete Candoli in 1953, with whom she had a daughter. Around 1953, she recorded several songs for the Sunset label with Candoli, Jimmy Rowles, Joe Mondragon and Shelly Manne such as 'S Wonderful and I Ain't Got Nothin' But the Blues. Candoli also arranged the songs for her only solo album, which she recorded with the Candoli Orchestra in 1959 for Time Records, I Swing for You. Then she performed songs in the jazz-oriented style like Love Is Not Born, My Romance, The Song Is You and The Trolley Song. In 1958, the couple divorced. Lane left Hollywood in 1963 and lived in Florida.

== Filmography ==
- Inflation (short) (1942)
- Presenting Lily Mars (1943)
- Hitler's Madman (uncredited) (1943)
- Bathing Beauty (uncredited) (1944)
- The Cisco Kid Returns (1945)
- The Jungle Captive (1945)
- Ethel Barrymore Theatre (TV series) 1 Episode (1956)
