= Acquanetta =

American actress (1921–2004)

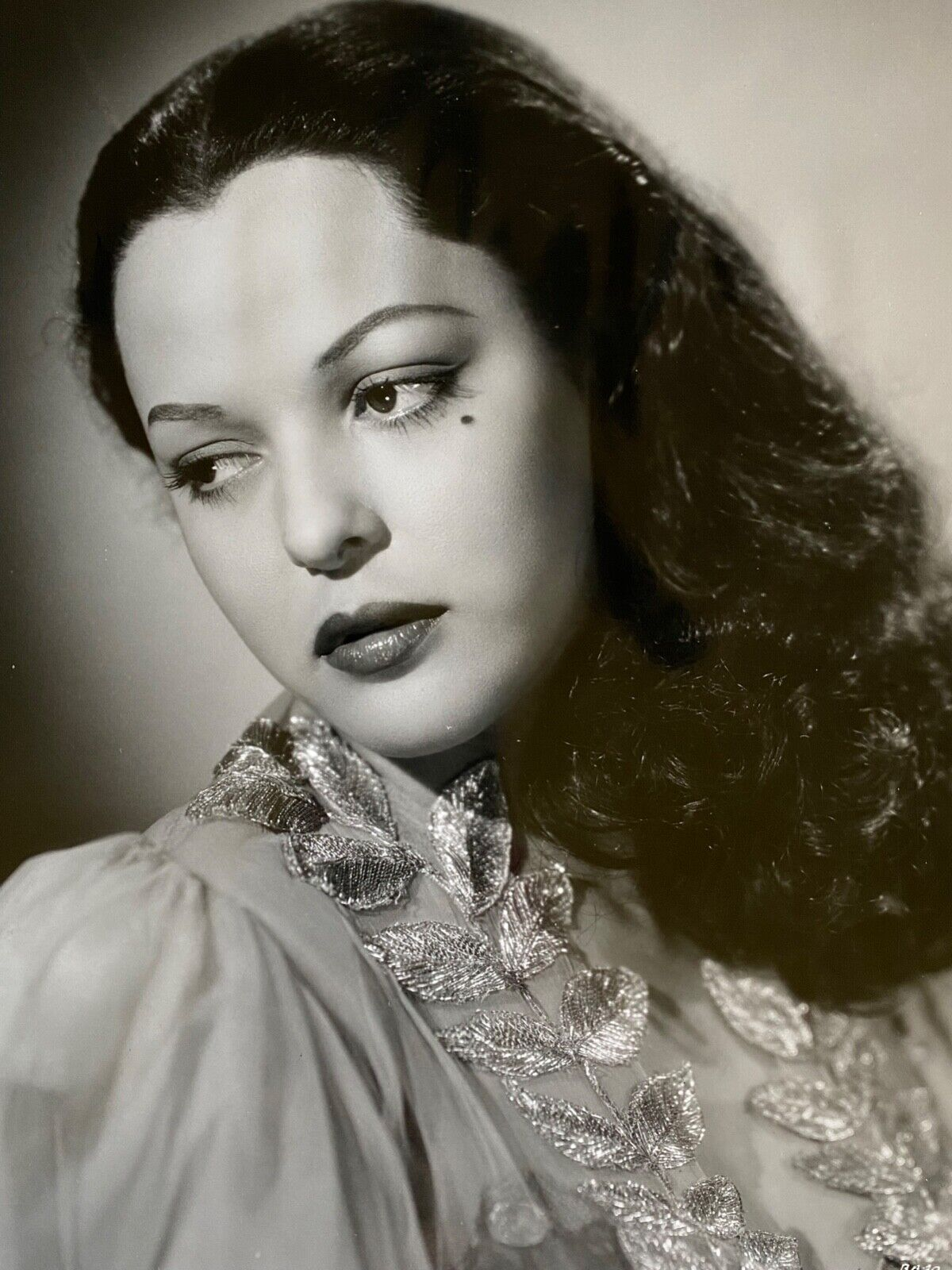
- Acquanetta in 1944
- Born: July 17, 1921
- Died: August 16, 2004 (aged 83); Ahwatukee, Arizona, U.S.
- Resting place: Paradise Memorial Gardens, Scottsdale, Arizona
- Other name: The Venezuelan Volcano
- Occupation: Actress
- Years active: 1942–1953
- Spouses: Luciano Bashuk (m. 1948; div. 1950) Henry Clive (m. 1950; div. 1953): Jack Ross (m. c. 1955; div.)
- Children: 5

Acquanetta (born July 17, 1921 – August 16, 2004), (Note: Some sources, including Social Security records, give her year of birth as 1920.) nicknamed "The Venezuelan Volcano", was an American B-movie actress during the 1940s and 1950s. Acquanetta was most known for her "exotic" beauty.

== Early years ==
The facts of Acquanetta's origins are not known with certainty. Although accounts differ (some giving her birth-name as Mildred Davenport, from Norristown, Pennsylvania), Acquanetta claimed she was born Burnu Acquanetta, meaning "Burning Fire/Deep Water", in Ozone, Wyoming. Orphaned from her Arapaho parents when she was two (or three), she lived briefly with another family before being taken in by an artistic couple with whom she remained until she made the choice to live independently at the age of fifteen. Other accounts suggest she was a light-skinned African American who concealed her heritage due to the racial discrimination of the era. Her career was followed closely by the African American press. In 1942, Life magazine noted her mysterious origins, but reported that she had lived with a Spanish family in Spanish Harlem posing as a Venezuelan before moving to Mexico, then Venezuela to obtain citizenship. The article suggests that the Arapaho orphan story was invented because she was unable to produce any identification for the Screen Actors Guild.

According to the 1940 US Census, she had five siblings, including a sister, Kathryn Davenport, and a brother, Horace Davenport, who was, according to the Pennsylvania Bar Association, "the first African-American judge in Montgomery County."

== Film career ==
Acquanetta started her career as a model in New York City with Harry Conover and John Robert Powers. She signed with Universal Studios in 1942 and acted mostly in B-movies, including Arabian Nights, The Sword of Monte Cristo, Captive Wild Woman and Jungle Woman, in which Universal attempted to create a female monster movie series with Acquanetta as a transformative ape. After her contract with Universal expired, Acquanetta signed on with Monogram Pictures but did not appear in any movies; she then signed with RKO where she acted in her only big-budget movie, Tarzan and the Leopard Woman.

== Personal life ==
In 1947, Acquanetta and "Mexican-Jewish millionaire" Luciano Baschuk had a son, Sergei (variously Sergio), who died of cancer in 1952 at age five, after the couple's bitter divorce in 1950, where she lost her suit for half his fortune when no record of their marriage could be produced. In 1950, Acquanetta married painter and illustrator Henry Clive, who was 40 years her senior, and returned to acting. The couple were divorced in 1953. That year she retired from films and became a disk jockey for radio station KPOL (AM) in Los Angeles.

By 1955 she had married Jack Ross, a car dealer who later ran for governor of Arizona in 1970 and 1974. The couple settled in Mesa, Arizona, and she returned to a degree of celebrity by appearing with Ross in his local television advertisements, and also by hosting a local television show called Acqua's Corner that accompanied the Friday late-night movies. The couple were prominent citizens, donating to the Phoenix Symphony and the construction of Mesa Lutheran Hospital and founding Stagebrush Theatre. She and Ross had four sons together, Lance, Tom, Jack Jr. and Rex, before divorcing in the early 1980s. In 1987, Acquanetta sold the Mesa Grande ruins to the city of Mesa. An apocryphal Phoenix legend has Acquanetta, upon learning of her husband's infidelity, filling the interior of his Lincoln Continental convertible with concrete.

Acquanetta wrote a book of poetry, published in 1974, titled The Audible Silence. She did not smoke, and did not drink alcohol, tea, or coffee.

Acquanetta succumbed to complications of Alzheimer's disease on August 16, 2004, at Hawthorn Court in Ahwatukee, Arizona. She was 83. She is buried in Paradise Memorial Gardens in East Shea, Scottsdale, Arizona.

== In popular culture ==
In 1987, the all-female band The Aquanettas adopted (and adapted) their name from hers.

Acquanetta's obituary inspired the composer Michael Gordon to collaborate with librettist Deborah Artman on the opera Acquanetta (2005/2017). Produced by Beth Morrison Projects, the chamber version received its world premiere at the Prototype Festival in Brooklyn, New York, in January 2018.

== Opera ==
Acquanetta, based on her life, premiered as a Grand Opera in 2006 in Aachen, Germany. The chamber version of Acquanetta had its world premiere at the 2018 Prototype Festival, followed by a subsequent run at Bard SummerScape in 2019.

== Filmography ==
Acquanetta filmography
Year	Film	Role	Notes
1942	Arabian Nights	Ishya	(uncredited)
1943	Rhythm of the Islands	Luani	as Burnu Acquanetta
1943	Captive Wild Woman	Paula Dupree – the Gorilla Girl	
1944	Jungle Woman	Paula Dupree – the Gorilla Girl	
1944	Dead Man's Eyes	Tanya Czoraki	
1946	Tarzan and the Leopard Woman	Lea, the High Priestess	
1951	The Sword of Monte Cristo	Felice	
1951	Lost Continent	Native Girl	
1951	Callaway Went Thataway	Native Girl with Smoky	Uncredited
1953	Take the High Ground!	Bar Girl	Uncredited
1989	Grizzly Adams – The Legend Never Dies		Direct-to-video release
