= Raúl Héctor Castro =

American judge and politician (1916–2015)

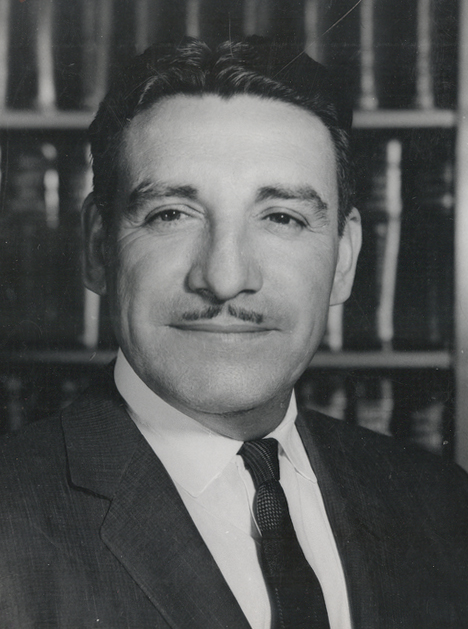
- Castro as a law student, c. 1940

40th United States Ambassador to Argentina
- In office November 16, 1977 – July 30, 1980
- President: Jimmy Carter
- Preceded by: Robert Hill
- Succeeded by: Harry Shlaudeman

14th Governor of Arizona
- In office January 6, 1975 – October 20, 1977
- Preceded by: Jack Williams
- Succeeded by: Wesley Bolin

United States Ambassador to Bolivia
- In office September 3, 1968 – November 3, 1969
- President: Lyndon B. Johnson; Richard Nixon
- Preceded by: Douglas Henderson
- Succeeded by: Ernest Siracusa

United States Ambassador to El Salvador
- In office December 11, 1964 – July 17, 1968
- President: Lyndon B. Johnson
- Preceded by: Murat Williams
- Succeeded by: William Bowdler

Personal details
- Born: Raúl Castro; June 12, 1916 Cananea, Sonora, Mexico
- Died: April 10, 2015 (aged 98) San Diego, California, U.S.
- Resting place: Sonora Community Cemetery; Sedona, Arizona
- Party: Democratic
- Spouse: Patricia Steiner (m. 1959)
- Education: Northern Arizona University (BS); University of Arizona (JD)

Raúl Héctor Castro (/rɑːˈuːl/; June 12, 1916 – April 10, 2015) was a Mexican American politician, diplomat and judge. In 1964, Castro was selected to be U.S. ambassador to El Salvador, a position he held until 1968 when he was appointed U.S. ambassador to Bolivia. In 1974, Castro was elected to serve as the 14th governor of Arizona, and resigned two years into his term to become U.S. ambassador to Argentina. Prior to his entry into public service, Castro was a lawyer and a judge for Pima County, Arizona. He was a member of the Democratic Party.

A native of Cananea, Sonora, Castro lived in Mexico until 1926 when he emigrated with his family to the U.S. state of Arizona, settling near Douglas. He enrolled in Arizona State Teachers College in Flagstaff, (Northern Arizona University), and upon graduation returned to his native Sonora to work for the U.S. Department of State as a foreign service clerk. Subsequently, he returned to Arizona to pursue a career as a lawyer and was graduated from the University of Arizona College of Law. Castro served as deputy county attorney for Pima County, Arizona until he was elected county attorney in 1954, and in 1958 he became a Pima County Superior Court Judge.

In 1964, Castro was selected by President Lyndon B. Johnson to become U.S. ambassador to El Salvador at the recommendation of Senator Carl Hayden, despite controversy over Castro's surname being associated with First Secretary of the Communist Party of Cuba Fidel Castro. Following a four-year term, he was then appointed to be U.S. ambassador to Bolivia, and resigned in 1969 to return to Arizona to begin a career in politics. Castro ran for and won the Democratic nomination for governor of Arizona in the 1970 election, but narrowly lost to incumbent governor Jack Williams. Castro would decide to run again in the 1974 election and defeated his Republican opponent Russell Williams, a member of the Arizona Corporation Commission, by a thin margin. Only two years into his term, Castro was approached by President Jimmy Carter to become U.S. ambassador to Argentina, and resigned as governor of Arizona. Castro left his post as ambassador in 1980, ending his career in public service, and returned to Arizona once again to practice law. He died at the age of 98 under hospice care in San Diego, California. Raul Hector Castro's papers are held at the University of Arizona Special Collections Library.

== Early life and education ==
Raúl Castro was born in Cananea, Sonora, Mexico on June 12, 1916. Castro was one of fourteen children born to his father Francisco Dominguez Castro, a deep sea diver in San Jose del Cabo, Baja California and later a miner in Cananea, and mother Rosario Acosta, who had a third grade education but taught her husband to read and write. Castro's father was involved in a mine workers strike in Cananea and was sent to prison, but was later released as a political refugee to the United States in 1926, with the entire family relocating to Pirtleville, Arizona, near Douglas, on the Arizona-Mexican border and becoming U.S. citizens. Castro's father would regularly read to him from Mexican newspapers in order for his son to be informed on current events, which Castro credited as his first exposure to politics. During his early teenage years, Castro's father died, and his mother became a midwife in order to support her children. At the time that Castro attended elementary school, schools were segregated in Douglas, and he attended the Fifteenth Street School, which was only for Mexican students. Despite this, Spanish was not allowed and Castro was forced to learn English in order to avoid punishment from school teachers. In high school, Castro played football as the team's quarterback, and also competed in track and field. At the time of his high school graduation, embarrassed that he did not have a middle name, Castro adopted the middle name Héctor, as it was the name of a basketball player at the school that he admired. Upon his graduation, Castro was discouraged from attending college by his high school principal, saying that it would be a waste of time and money because no one would hire a Mexican graduate on the border.

Despite being dissuaded from attending college, Castro earned a football scholarship and attended Arizona State Teachers College in Flagstaff, which is now known as Northern Arizona University. At the time he attended, the school had approximately 475 students. One of the conditions of the scholarship included the requirement of washing dishes three times a week, and Castro worked his way up to become an assistant cook. He also took up boxing, and additionally taught a local sixth grade class in Flagstaff. Castro became a naturalized United States citizen at the age of 23, and returned to Douglas in order to pursue a career in teaching. He was turned down for employment due to being a Mexican immigrant, and was discouraged enough to hop onto a freight train and pursue boxing professionally, earning fifty dollars per fight. Later, he decided to once again return to Douglas and work for the U.S. Department of State as a foreign service clerk in Agua Prieta, a border city in his native Sonora. He was convinced by a friend to quit his job with the State Department and instead pursue a career as a lawyer, and decided to attend the University of Arizona College of Law. In order to pay his way through law school, Castro became a Spanish professor at the University of Arizona due to a sudden opening, but this caused complications with his admittance to law school as the dean felt he would not be able to dedicate himself to his studies while also maintaining a job as an educator. Castro had developed a relationship with the university's president, who contacted the dean of the law school and subsequently convinced the dean to admit Castro. Castro earned his Juris Doctor degree and was admitted to the Arizona Bar in 1949. In 1959, he married his long-time girlfriend, Patricia Steiner. Their honeymoon in Mexico City was the same hotel where Fidel Castro was planning the Cuban Revolution, and the couple received "phone calls and knocks on their door from men carrying pistols who had mistakenly been directed to the wrong Castro." Castro and Steiner had two daughters.

== Law career, U.S. Ambassador to El Salvador, Bolivia ==
After earning his law degree from the University of Arizona, Castro practiced law for two years in Tucson and subsequently served as a deputy county attorney for Pima County, Arizona. At the time, Mo Udall was the county attorney, and upon his retirement gathered all of the deputy county attorneys to inform them that he had handpicked his successor, Ed Larkin. Castro walked out of the meeting, angered by the dictatorial way that Udall had selected his successor despite county attorney being an elected position, and in 1954, Castro decided to run for the position himself. Castro won the election by 65 votes, becoming the first Mexican American to hold such a position in the state. He served in that capacity until 1958 when he became a Pima County Superior Court Judge.

Castro earned a growing reputation during his time as a Superior Court Judge, and received a call from Roy Elson, an aide to U.S. Senator Carl Hayden who offered Castro a position as a United States Attorney. Castro was not satisfied with his offer, as he felt he would be going backwards from being a Superior Court Judge, and rejected Elson while also stating that he wanted to be a U.S. Ambassador instead. Elson informed Senator Hayden of Castro's desire to be a U.S. Ambassador, and Hayden approached President Lyndon B. Johnson about the possibility of appointing Castro. At first, Johnson was opposed to appointing Castro due to the association of the surname Castro with that of Cuban President Fidel Castro, as well as Fidel's brother, Raúl Castro. Not wanting to potentially upset voters in the wake of the 1964 presidential election, Johnson requested that Castro change his last name to his mother's maiden name, but Castro refused and said, "I like my name. I'm not changing my name." Johnson relented, and selected Castro to be United States Ambassador to El Salvador in 1964. During his time as Ambassador to El Salvador, he was presented with the country's highest honor, the Order of José Matías Delgado. After four years as U.S. Ambassador to El Salvador, he was then appointed as United States Ambassador to Bolivia, and became known as the "Ambassador on Horseback," as Castro would ride into the countryside on horseback and greet the Bolivian citizens. While U.S. Ambassador to Bolivia, Castro's home was bombed twice by terrorists. He served in the position until the following year when Richard Nixon was elected president, and Castro was subsequently removed from office.

== Political career ==
=== 1970 gubernatorial campaign ===
After returning to Arizona and leaving his post as U.S. Ambassador to Bolivia, Castro was approached about the possibility of running for Governor of Arizona in the 1970 gubernatorial election. On June 18, 1970, Castro announced his bid for the Democratic nomination, challenging Phoenix auto dealer Jack Ross and Chandler Mayor George Nader. Castro held the announcement in Tucson, but around 50 people showed up, believing that he had no chance of becoming the Democratic nominee. Despite this, Castro went on to win the Democratic nomination by a significant margin, and challenged incumbent governor Jack Williams in his bid for a third term. During the general election campaign, Republicans attacked Castro for supposedly favoring Mexican immigrants during his time as Pima County attorney, and that he had been an "adequate" judge, but not an "outstanding" one. Ultimately, however, the Republicans decided against attacking Castro's record out of fear that they would be castigated for attacking a minority, which Jack Williams' campaign manager stated that he later regretted due to Castro's willingness to attack Williams. Most of Williams' support resided in the most populous county, Maricopa County, while the rest of the state supported Castro. Ultimately, however, Castro lost the general election by a narrow margin, with Williams earning 50.9% of the vote to Castro's 49.1%.

=== 1974 gubernatorial campaign ===
Incumbent governor Jack Williams decided against running for a fourth term as Governor of Arizona, which led to five candidates announcing their intention to seek the Republican nomination in his place, including perennial candidate Evan Mecham (who would later become governor, and subsequently impeached) as well as Arizona Corporation Commissioner Russell Williams (no relation to Jack Williams). Castro announced his decision to pursue the Democratic nomination once again in the 1974 election, and faced very little opposition in the Democratic primary, receiving more than double the number of votes over his two competitors. In contrast, the Republican primary was highly contested and led to a split among Republican Party members, with Russell Williams emerging as their nominee. Due to the closeness of the 1970 election, the Hispanic community was encouraged about the possibility of Castro being able to achieve the office of governor, and volunteered for his campaign in droves. Castro ultimately won the general election by another close margin, receiving only 4,119 more votes than Russell Williams. The margin was credited to the Navajo vote in Navajo and Apache counties where Castro received 5,488 more votes than Williams. A few weeks after the election Castro attended the grand opening of a Nogales, Sonora bank after which he returned to the U.S. via the Grand Avenue pedestrian gate. He was in the company of two Mexican bank executives who presented their border crossing permits to the Immigration officer on duty. Castro declared himself as a U.S. citizen whereupon the officer challenged him and asked for proof of his U.S. citizenship. Castro replied by suggesting that they call Senator Goldwater to ask him if it would be ok to admit the Governor Elect of Arizona into his state.

=== Governor of Arizona (1975–1977) ===
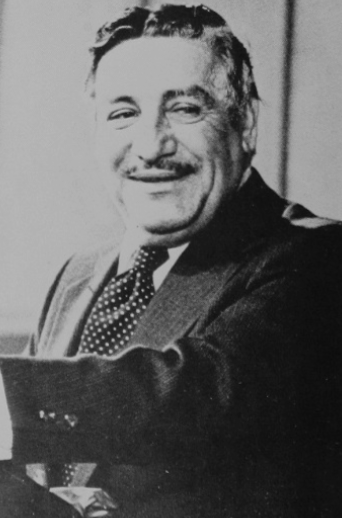
Castro as governor.

On January 6, 1975, Castro was sworn into office as the 14th Governor of Arizona, becoming the first Mexican American to hold the position since Arizona earned its statehood in 1912. Along with his election as governor, the Arizona State Senate also leaned Democratic, with 18 Democratic members to 12 Republican members. However, the Arizona State House remained in Republican control, with 33 Republicans to 27 Democrats. During his term as governor, Castro was heavily criticized by Republicans, who believed that Castro simply wanted to have the title of governor, rather than actually perform the duties involved with holding the office. Columnist John Kolbe of the Phoenix Gazette wrote about Castro, saying "Covering the amiable and peripatetic chief executive has become a newsman's jungle of half-completed sentences, imprecise factual data, and even contradictory assertions." While serving as governor, Castro campaigned in the 1976 presidential election for former Georgia Governor Jimmy Carter, despite this, Gerald Ford won Arizona. Castro also campaigned for Carter in New Mexico and Texas.

=== Resignation, U.S. Ambassador to Argentina ===
Facing growing criticism during his term as Governor of Arizona, including sustained opposition from the state legislature, Castro was offered the position of U.S. Ambassador to Argentina under President Jimmy Carter, in 1977. Arizona Secretary of State Wesley Bolin succeeded Castro as governor, following his resignation, but Bolin would die in office less than a year into his term. Castro was ambivalent about resigning from the office of governor, not wanting to let down the Hispanic community that had helped to elect him to the position. However, Castro would later state that he felt he would be of greater help to the Hispanic community, serving in the capacity of U.S. Ambassador to Argentina. Castro again faced adversity during his time as Ambassador, due to his Mexican heritage, with many Argentinians questioning why the United States would select a Mexican to serve in Argentina. Castro served in the position from 1977 to 1980, which was his final political post.

== Honors ==
In 2007, Castro's alma mater, Northern Arizona University, named the home of the College of Social and Behavioral Sciences in his honor. As a student, he competed in track and boxing for the school; he was inducted into the Northern Arizona University Athletics Hall of Fame in 1988 and into the College of Social and Behavioral Science Hall of Fame in 2011.

== Detainment by Border Patrol ==
On June 12, 2012, on his birthday, Castro was detained by agents of the United States Border Patrol for a half hour while being driven as a passenger in a car to a birthday celebration from his home in Nogales, Arizona to the Mountain Oyster Club in Tucson, Arizona. The then 96-year-old Castro was not allowed to wait in his vehicle and was instead forced to wait outside the car in the near 100-degree heat and without water. The traffic stop was apparently triggered when the agents detected a small amount of radiation coming from the car, radiation which was apparently caused by a medical procedure performed on Castro the previous day at Tucson Heart Hospital.

== Death ==
On April 10, 2015, Castro died in his sleep while under hospice care in San Diego, aged 98.

== See also ==
- List of governors of Arizona
- List of Hispanic and Latino American jurists
- List of minority governors and lieutenant governors in the United States
- List of United States governors born outside the United States

Diplomatic posts
Preceded by Murat Williams	United States Ambassador to El Salvador; 1964–1968	Succeeded by William Bowdler
Preceded by Douglas Henderson	United States Ambassador to Bolivia; 1968–1969	Succeeded by Ernest Siracusa
Preceded by Robert Hill	United States Ambassador to Argentina; 1977–1980	Succeeded by Harry Shlaudeman
Party political offices
Preceded by Samuel Goddard	Democratic nominee for Governor of Arizona; 1970, 1974	Succeeded by Bruce Babbitt
Political offices
Preceded by Jack Williams	Governor of Arizona; 1975–1977	Succeeded by Wesley Bolin
Honorary titles
Preceded by Albert Rosellini	Oldest living American governor 2011–2015	Succeeded by Edgar Whitcomb
