= The Monster and the Girl =

1941 film by Stuart Heisler

- Directed by: Stuart Heisler
- Screenplay by: Stuart Anthony
- Produced by: Jack Moss
- Starring: Ellen Drew; Robert Paige; Paul Lukas; Joseph Calleia; Onslow Stevens; George Zucco
- Cinematography: Victor Milner
- Edited by: Everett Douglas
- Music by: Gerard Carbonara; John Leipold (uncredited)
- Production company: Paramount Pictures
- Distributed by: Paramount Pictures
- Release date: 28 February 1941
- Running time: 64 minutes
- Country: United States

The Monster and the Girl is a 1941 American black-and-white horror film directed by Stuart Heisler and released by Paramount Pictures.

== Plot ==
The film revolves around a small-town church-organist named Scot Webster (Philip Terry) attempting to save his sister, Susan (Ellen Drew) from the clutches of big city gangster W. S. Bruhl (Paul Lukas). Scot is framed for the murder of one of Bruhl's gang and sentenced to execution. A scientist (George Zucco) salvages Scot's brain and transplants it into a gorilla. Using the strength of his new bestial body, Scot begins stalking the gangsters to exact his revenge.

== Cast ==
- Ellen Drew as Susan Webster
- Robert Paige as Larry Reed
- Paul Lukas as W. S. Bruhl
- Joseph Calleia as 'Deacon'
- Onslow Stevens as J. Stanley McMasters
- George Zucco as Dr. Perry
- Rod Cameron as Sam Daniels
- Phillip Terry as Scot Webster
- Marc Lawrence as Sleeper
- Gerald Mohr as Munn
- Bud Jamison as Doorman Jim
- Abner Biberman as George
- Emory Parnell as Policeman
- Edward Van Sloan as Dave
- Tom Dugan as Captain Alton
- Edward Peil Sr. as Court Clerk (uncredited)
- Charlie Gemora as The Gorilla
- Skipper the Dog

== Production ==
The Monster and the Girl was developed under the title of Dead On Arrival (written as D.O.A.). After the release of Michael Curtiz's film The Walking Dead in 1936, a few films combined genre themes of crime films and science-fiction horror. These included The Man They Could Not Hang, Before I Hang and Black Friday, all of which featured individuals who return from the dead to exact revenge. The Monster and the Girl used this theme but applied it to a monster movie.

The censorship board rejected the original story due to plot elements of white slavery and homicide. The script was changed to imply Susan's entrapment by Munn. This also changed Susan being forced into prostitution and working as a bar hostess to pay off the debt for her apartment. The film went into production in Late July and finished filming in late August 1940.

== Release ==
The Monster and the Girl was distributed theatrically by Paramount Pictures on February 28, 1941. After its release, the Milwaukee Film Commission withdrew the film from theaters on the grounds that it was a "white slavery" film. The ban also stated that it showcased juries as being under gangster control which would make it impossible for justice to be carried out.

The Monster and the Girl was released on Blu-ray by Scream Factory on June 16, 2020 as the fifth volume in their Universal Horror Collection, along with Captive Wild Woman, Jungle Woman and Jungle Captive. It features an informative audio commentary by Tom Weaver and Steve Kronenberg.

== Reception ==
Blair Davis, author of Recovering 1940s Horror Cinema described the reception of the film as positive. A review in The Chicago Tribune calling it "weird and skeery [sic] no end" but full of "snappy dialog". The review added that Ellen Drew "depicts stark terror so realistically that I feel she is scheduled to slip into the boot of Fay Wray". Variety called the film "a chiller-diller that will send fans of goose-pimply melodrama from the theaters amply satisfied" and "red meat of the bugaboo ticket buyers".

From retrospective reviews, Craig Butler of AllMovie declared the film as "definitely one of the strangest pictures ever made", that was still "fairly effective and entertaining little "B" flick—and not one that gets by just on camp value", noting that the story’s plot points were ridiculous, but "has some very interesting points, including a mixture of noir and horror which, while not totally successful, offers some rewards" and that "the cast is also much better than one usually finds in horror films of this type".
