= Mesa Grande =

Archaeological site in Arizona, United States

- Sce:dagĭ Mu:val Va’aki
- U.S. National Register of Historic Places
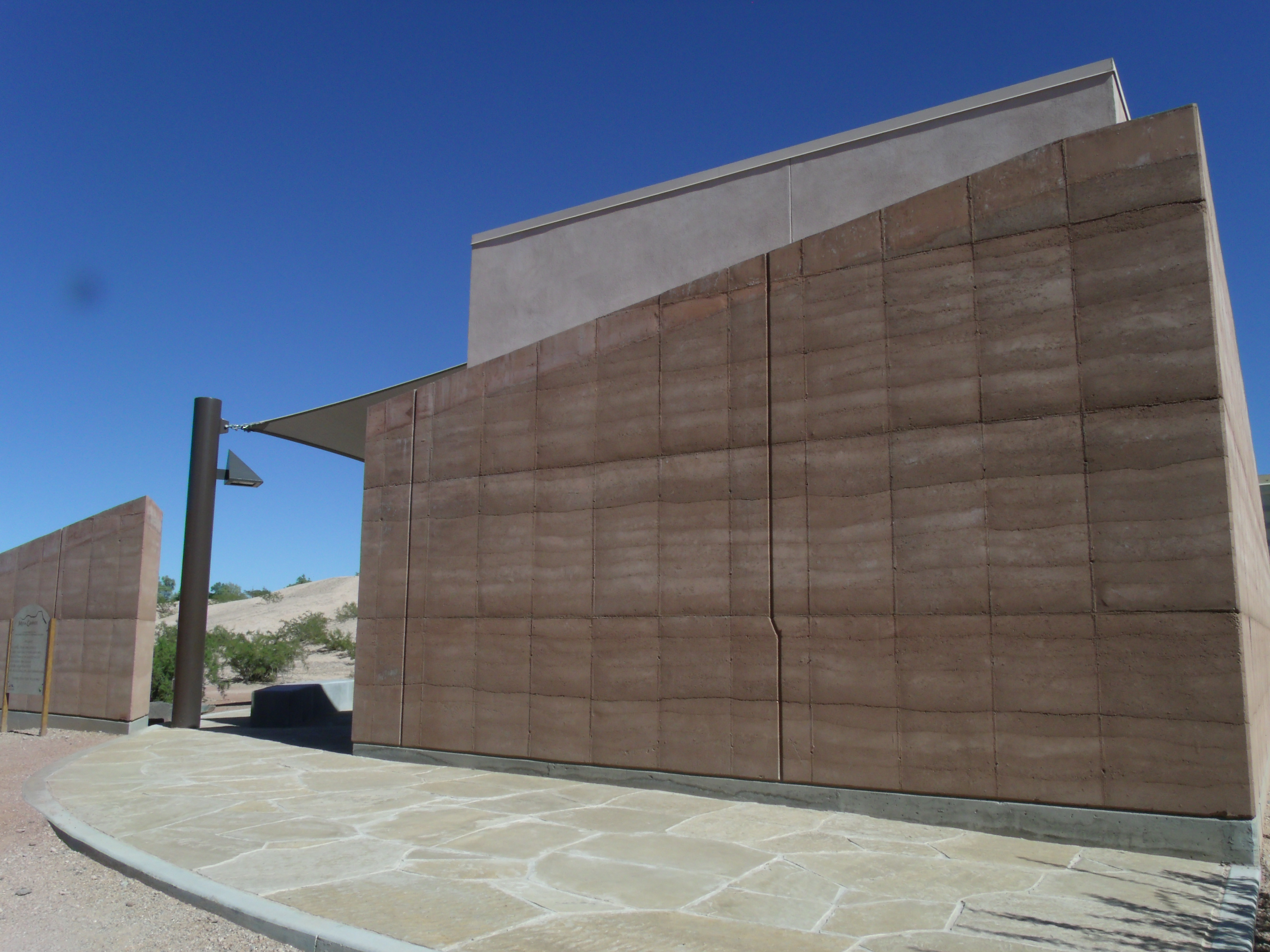
- Entrance of Sce:dagĭ Mu:val Va’aki

- Location within Arizona Location within the United States
- Nearest city: Mesa, Arizona
- Coordinates: 33.43415°N 111.845271°W
- Architectural style: Hohokam
- NRHP reference No.: 78000549
- Added to NRHP: November 21, 1978

Sce:dagĭ Mu:val Va’aki (formerly known as Mesa Grande Cultural Park), in Mesa, Arizona, preserves a group of Hohokam structures constructed during the Classic Period. The ruins were occupied between AD 1100 and 1400 (Pueblo II – Pueblo IV Era) and were a product of the Hohokam civilization that inhabited the Salt River Valley. There the Hohokam constructed an extensive system of water canals. It is one of only two Hohokam mounds remaining in the metro Phoenix area, with the other being the Pueblo Grande Museum Archaeological Park. The site's central feature is a massive ruin of adobe walls and platforms.

It was listed on the National Register of Historic Places in 1978 when it was owned by B-movie actress Acquanetta and her husband Jack Ross. The site was acquired from them in 1988 by the city of Mesa.

Since the 2013 completion of the Visitor Center, the site is seasonally open to the public from October through May.

Sce:dagĭ Mu:val Va’aki is operated by the Arizona Museum of Natural History, which is undertaking archaeological studies there. The mound remains remarkably intact. The general site remains protected but undeveloped.

The ruins are located to the west and across the street from the former Mesa Lutheran Hospital, which became a Banner Health corporate center housing billing and information technology employees.

Artifacts presumably associated with the ruins have been found in the neighborhood to the west. Axe heads, arrow heads, and pottery sherds were regularly uncovered and collected by residents during the 1960s and 1970s just under the surface of the earth in private property there.

== Gallery ==
Sce:dagĭ Mu:val Va’aki
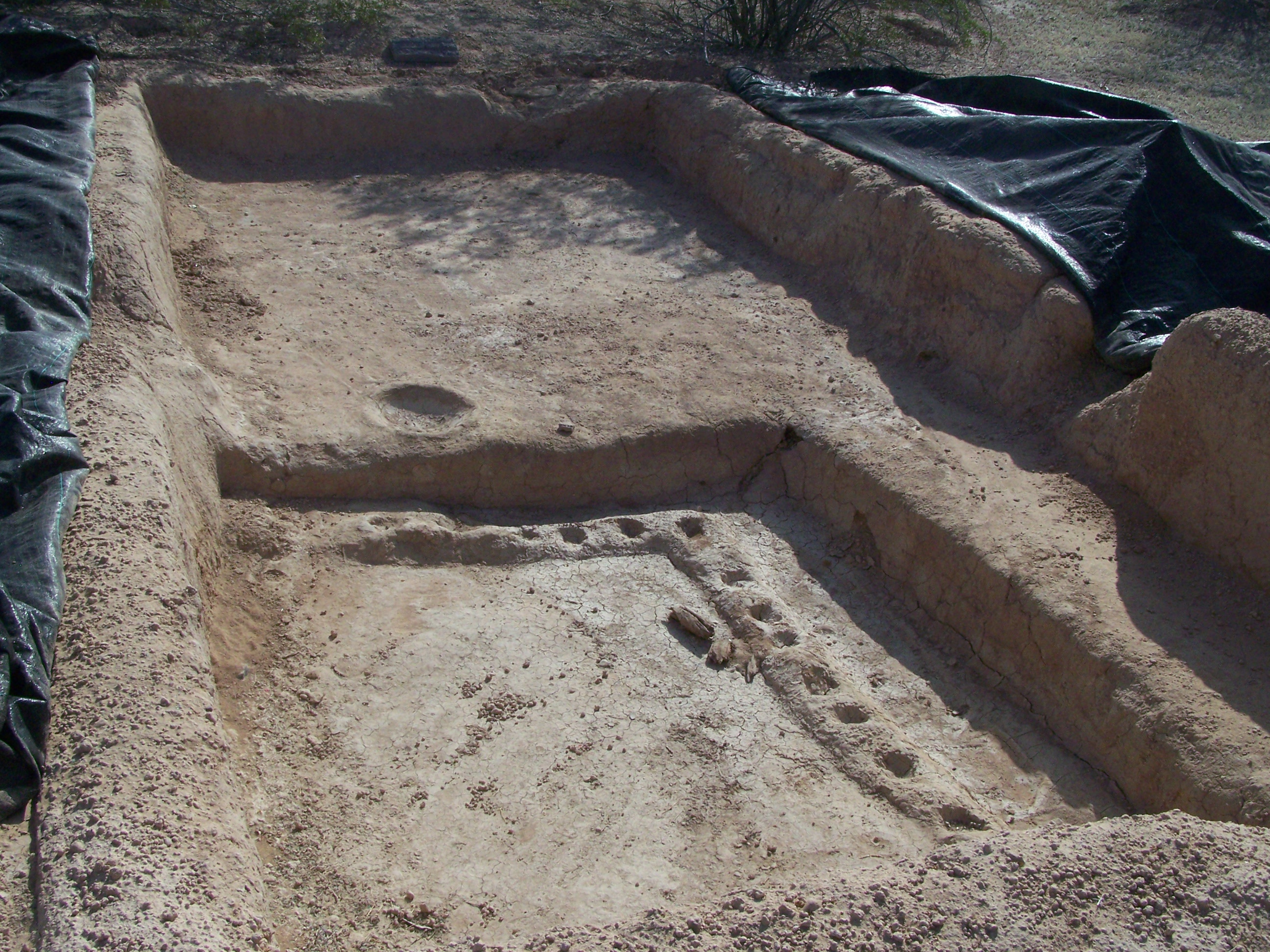
"Room D", a 1955 excavation by Arizona State University below the main mound.

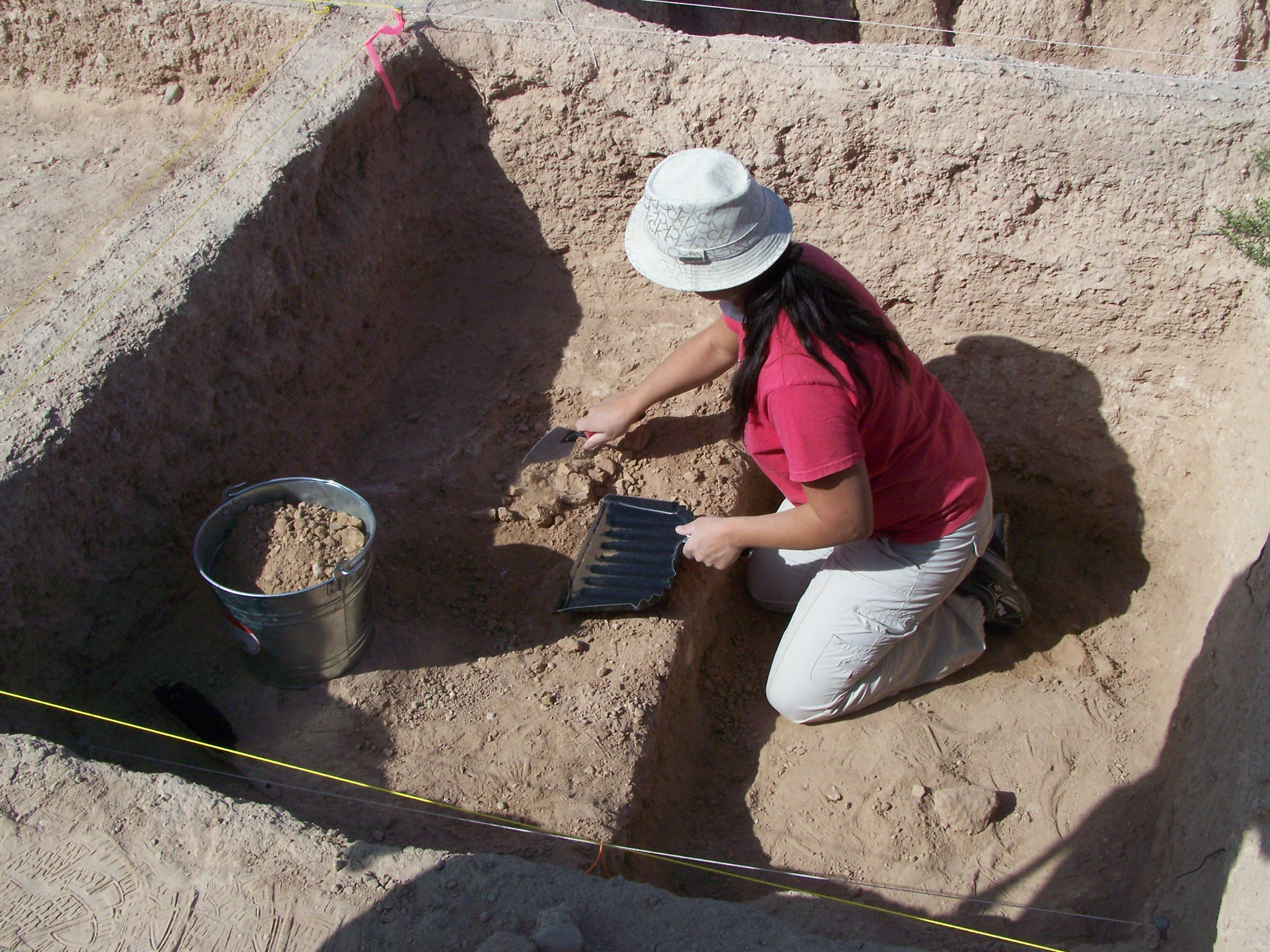
A member of the Southwest Archaeology Team excavates matrix materials from a test pit.

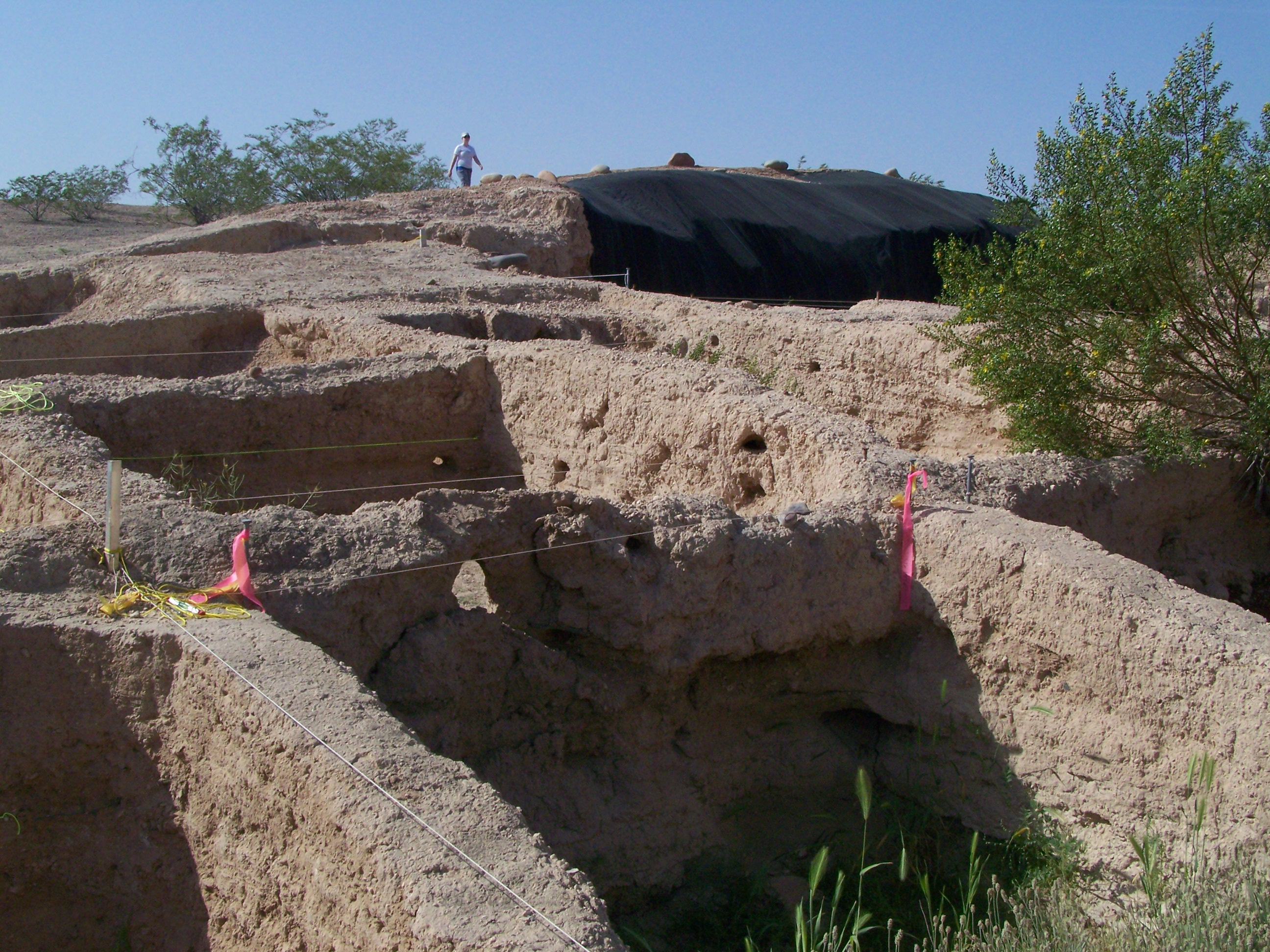
A view of test pits from Station 6 of the north end of the mound.

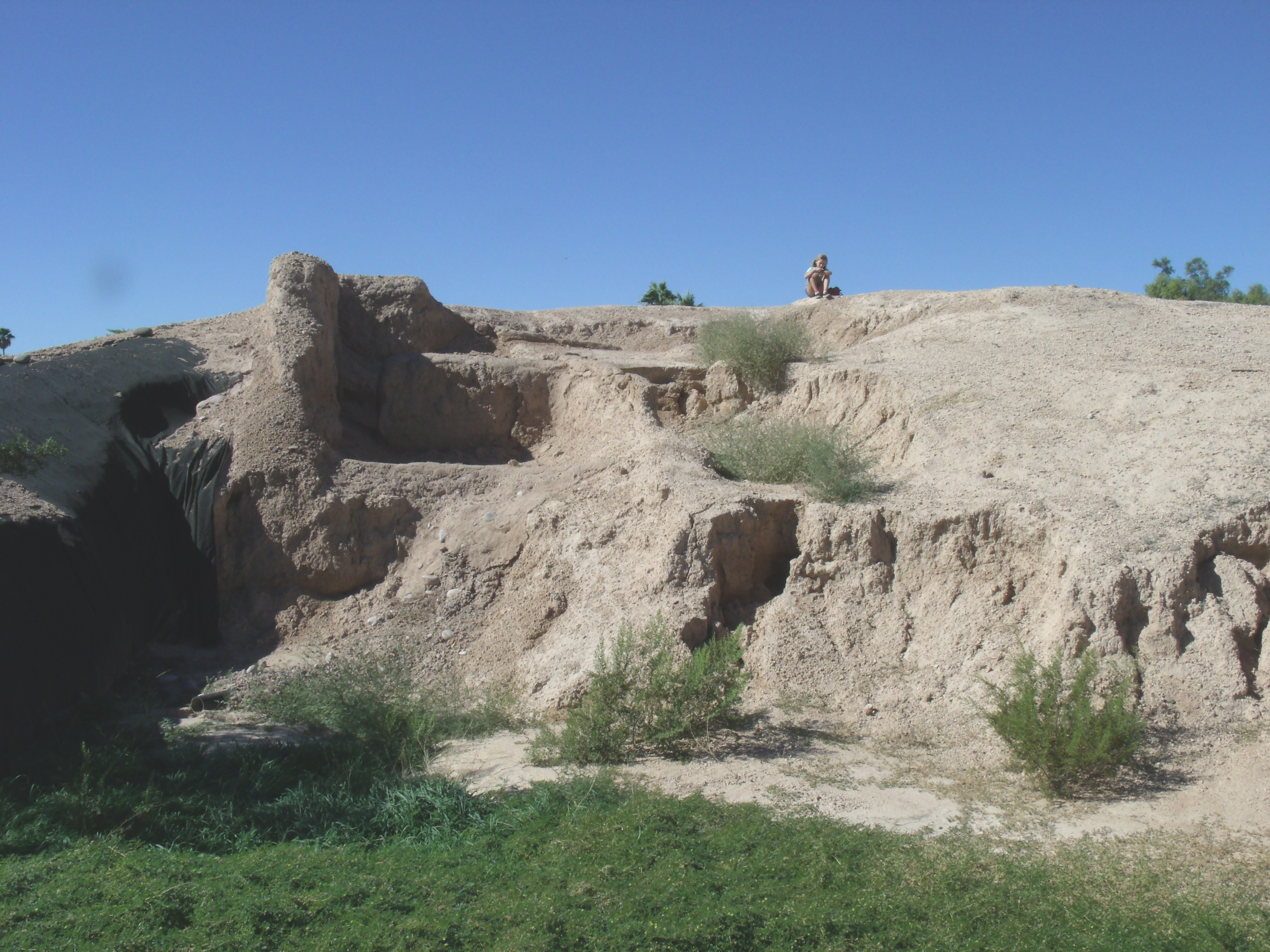
The Temple Mound. Built by the Hohokam in 1100 AD. The walls are made of “caliche”, the calcium carbonate hardpan that forms under the desert soils. The mound is longer and wider than a modern football field (note: U.S. Football) and is 27 feet high.

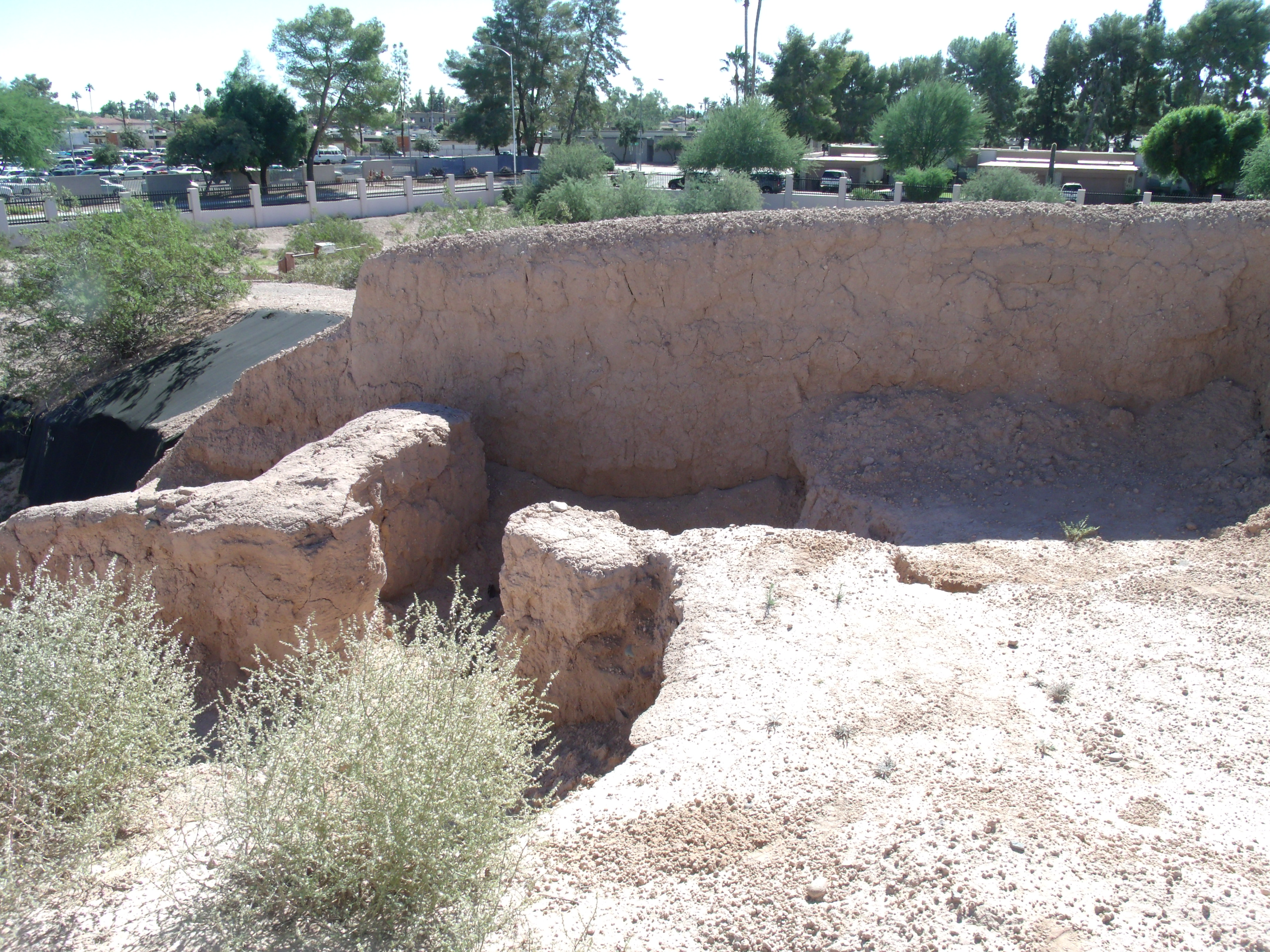
Different view of the Temple Mound.

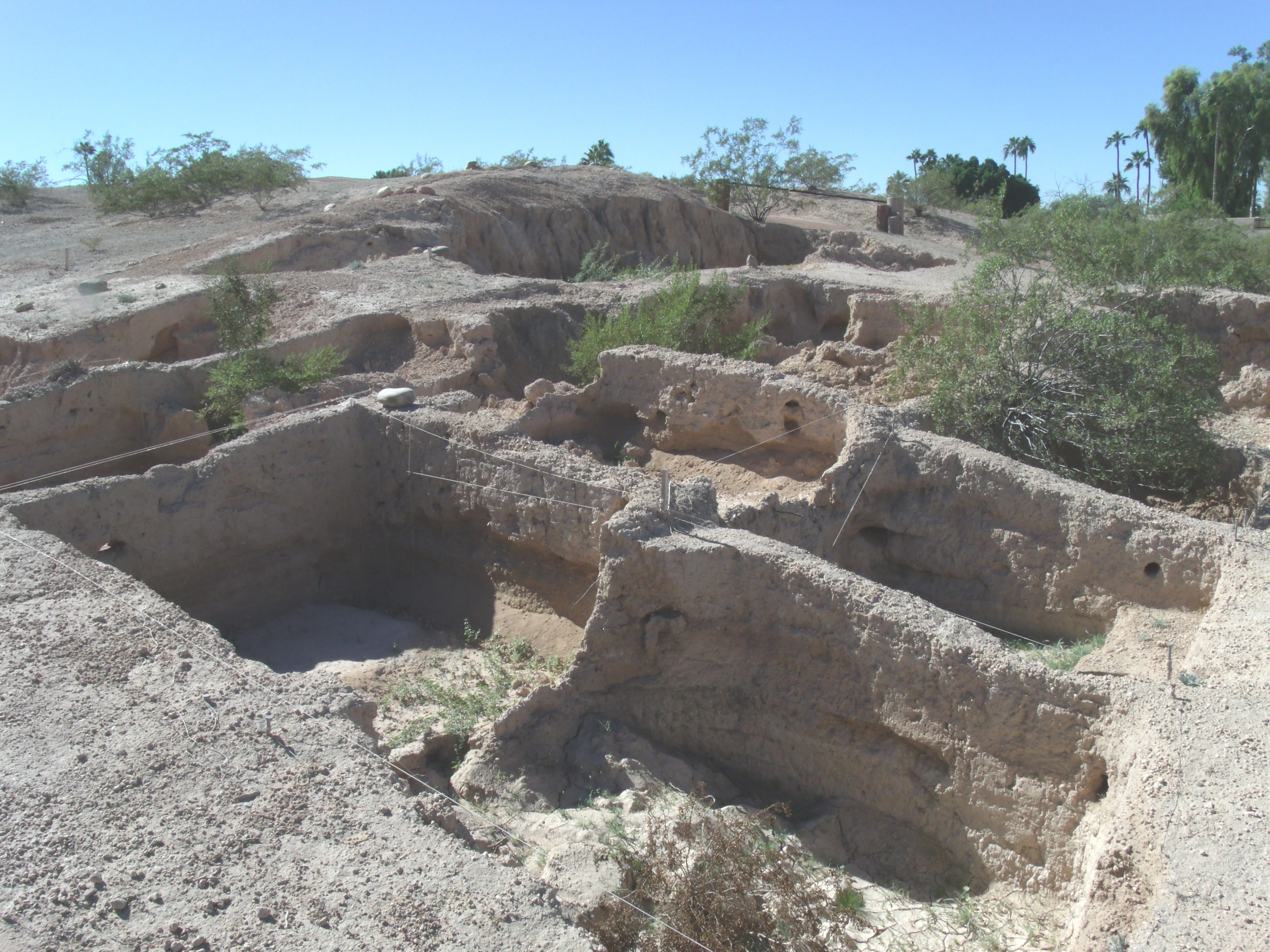
A large plaza in front of the Temple mound which was enclosed by a large adobe wall.

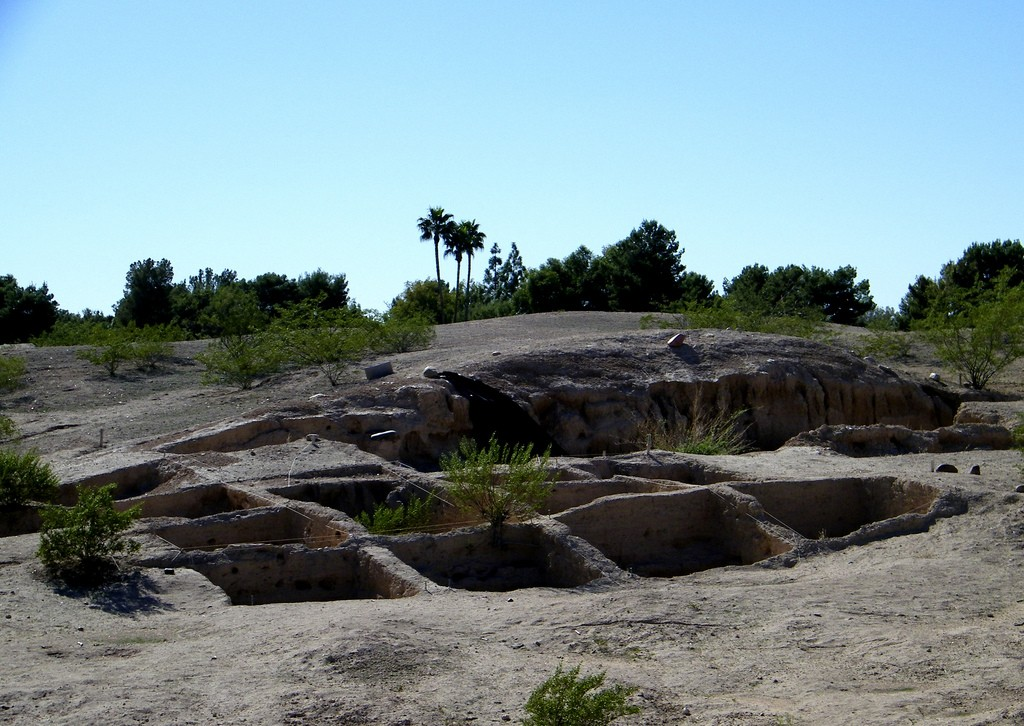
Another view of the plaza.

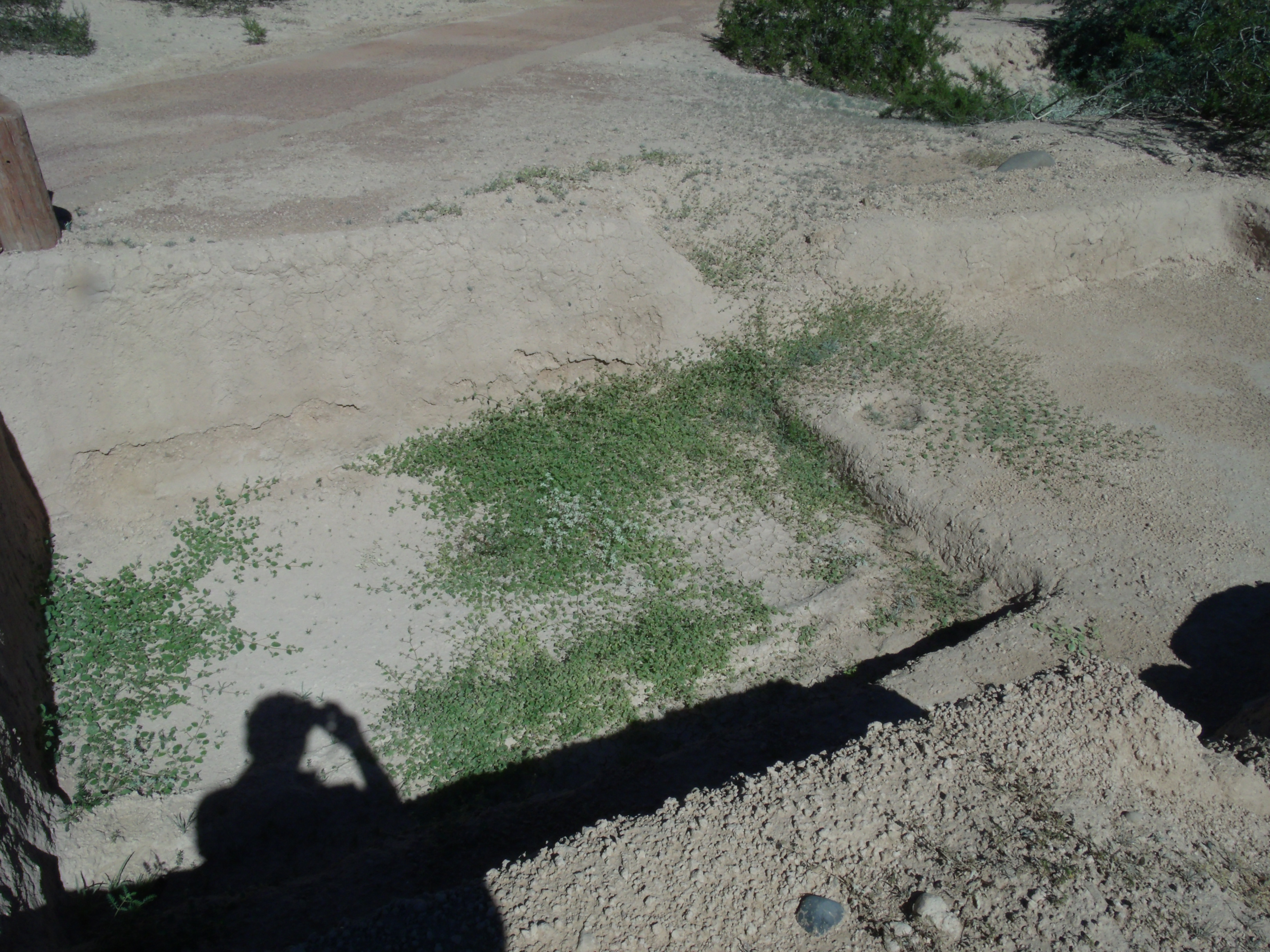
One of the two largest networks of irrigation canals created in the prehistoric Americas by the Hohokam.

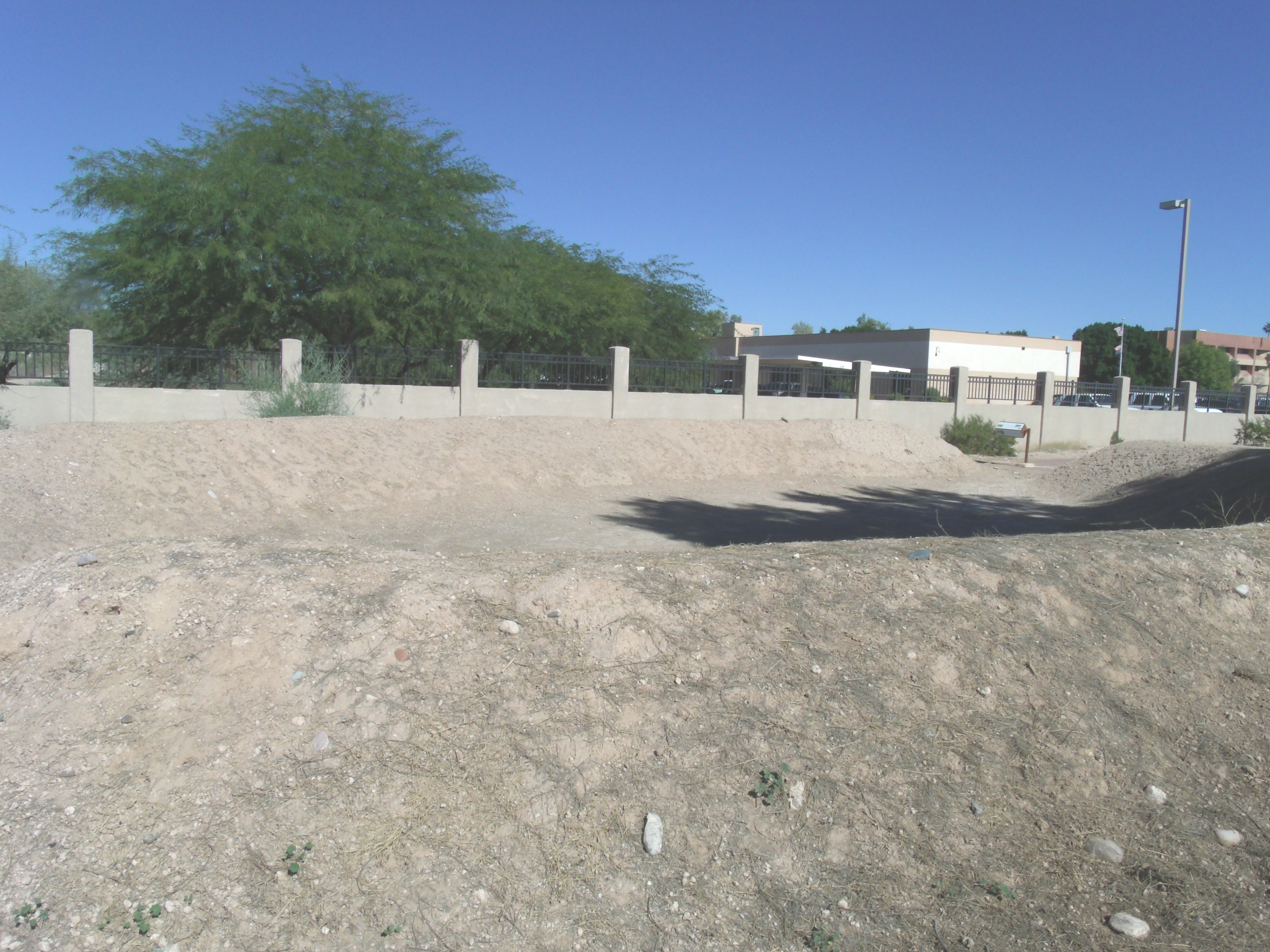
Replica of the Hohokam Ballcourt . The ballcourt, which is located at 1000 N. Date St., is an open-air structure where the Hohokam played ballgames using a rubber ball made from a local plant.

== See also ==
- Casa Grande Ruins National Monument
- Oasisamerica cultures
