= Captive Wild Woman =

1943 film by Edward Dmytryk

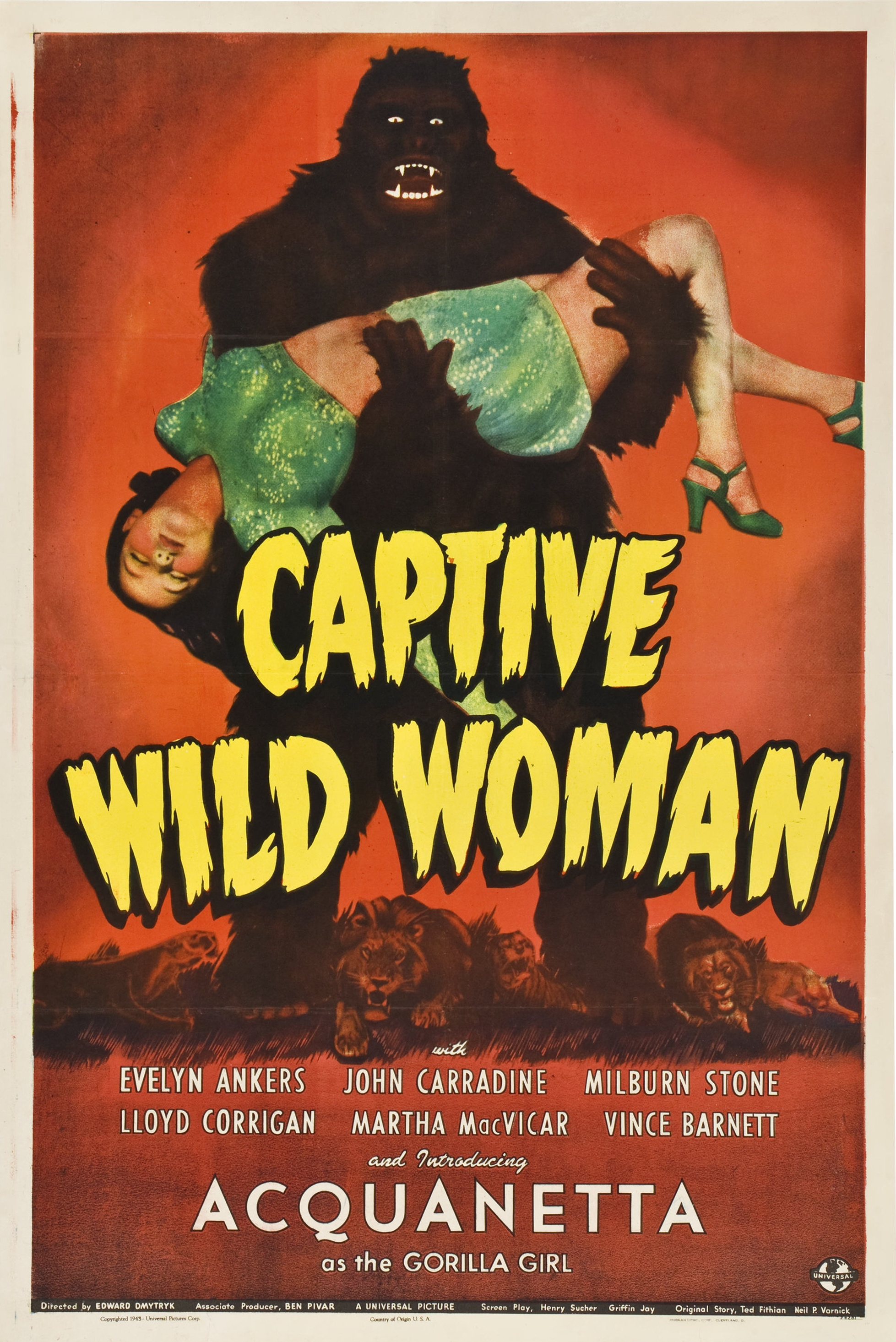
- Theatrical release poster
- Directed by: Edward Dmytryk
- Screenplay by: Griffin Jay; Henry Sucher
- Story by: Ted Fithian; Neil P. Varnick; Maurice Pivar
- Starring: John Carradine; Evelyn Ankers; Milburn Stone; Lloyd Corrigan; Vince Barnett; Acquanetta
- Cinematography: George Milton Carruth
- Edited by: Milton Carruth
- Production company: Universal Pictures Company, Inc.
- Distributed by: Universal Pictures Company, Inc.
- Release date: 4 June 1943
- Running time: 60 minutes
- Country: United States
- Language: English

Captive Wild Woman is a 1943 American horror film directed by Edward Dmytryk. The film stars Evelyn Ankers, John Carradine, Milburn Stone, and features Acquanetta as Paula, the Ape Woman. The film involves a scientist, Dr. Sigmund Walters, whose experiments turn a female gorilla named Cheela into a human by injecting the ape with sex hormones and via brain transplants.

Captive Wild Woman was initially announced by Universal Pictures in 1940 with several promotional campaigns that did not reflect what ended up in the film. The film was intended to start filming in 1941 and January 1942, but only began filming in December 1942, ending in production the following year. The film received lukewarm reviews from The New York Times, The New York Daily News and Harrison's Reports who only recommended the film to horror fans. It was followed by two sequels in the 1940s: Jungle Woman and The Jungle Captive.

== Plot ==
An animal trainer, Fred Mason, returns from his latest safari with a horde of animals for his employer John Whipple, owner of the Whipple Circus. Among them is Cheela, a gorilla with remarkably human characteristics. Mason relates that she is the most affectionate jungle animal he has ever encountered. Mason's fiancée Beth Colman is present at the dock for his return. She tells him of the recent health problems encountered by her sister Dorothy. Beth reflects on taking her sibling to see Dr. Sigmund Walters, an endocrinologist of some standing. Dorothy is staying at Walters’ Crestview Sanatorium for treatment. Fred and Beth arrive at the winter quarters, and Dr. Walters pays a visit. He is extremely interested in Cheela, and inquires about purchasing her. Whipple tells him that she is not for sale. Upon returning to his lab, Walters finds that his latest experiment has resulted in the lab animal's death. He becomes convinced he needs larger animals that possess the "will to live". Walters enlists the aid of a disgruntled former circus employee to steal Cheela. After the ape is loaded onto his truck, the scientist callously pushes the man into the gorilla's grasp and stolidly watches as the beast wrings his neck.

Back at his lab, Walters and his assistant Miss Strand transplant glandular material from Dorothy into Cheela. There was discussion by Miss Strand that Walters has previously grafted the glands of different animals like placing a guinea pig's glands into a rabbit and a frog's glands into a mouse. To the horror of the nurse, the ape transforms into human form. Telling the doctor that she cannot allow him to continue, Miss Strand informs him that at best he will have "a human form, with animal instincts". Dr. Walters reaches the conclusion that he will need to place a human brain into his creation to successfully complete his experiment. He sacrifices Miss Strand for this purpose. The brain transplant is a success, and the result is a sultry and exotic young woman who remembers nothing of her previous existence. Walters names her Paula Dupree, and takes his creation to the winter quarters for her first public outing. While watching Mason practice his animal act, an accident occurs. Paula rushes into the cage and saves him from the ferocious felines, who display an unnatural fear of her and retreat from her presence. Mason is dumbfounded and offers the girl a job in his act.

After the final dress rehearsal, Paula becomes jealous of Mason's fiancée. She goes to her dressing room and while having a tantrum, begins transforming to animal form. Later that night, she climbs through Beth's window planning to kill her, but attacks and brutally murders another woman instead. The beast returns to Walters, and the doctor realizes that another operation is necessary to return her to human form. He can continue to use Dorothy for the glandular material, but will need yet another subject to replace Paula's damaged cerebrum.

Beth receives a frantic telephone call from her sister who expresses her fear of Dr. Walters and the forthcoming operation. Arriving at the Sanatorium to aid her sister, Beth is pegged by the good doctor as the next brain donor for Cheela. However, she proves resourceful in a pinch, releasing the ape from its cage. Cheela does Walters in and departs the lab, leaving Beth and Dorothy unharmed. Performing his animal act solo, Mason finds himself trapped inside the cage with his unruly subjects. A powerful storm interrupts the performance and the beasts attack the trainer. Cheela comes to his rescue once again and carries him to safety, but a nearby police officer mistakes her intentions and kills Cheela.

== Cast ==
- Evelyn Ankers as Beth Colman
- John Carradine as Dr. Sigmund Walters
- Milburn Stone as Fred Mason
- Lloyd Corrigan as John Whipple
- Acquanetta as Paula Dupree / The Ape Woman
- Martha Vickers as Dorothy Colman (as Martha MacVicar)
- Fay Helm as Nurse Strand
- Vince Barnett as Curly, a rube
- Paul Fix as The Handler
- Ray Corrigan as Cheela the Gorilla
- Ray Walker as Ringmaster

== Production ==
Captive Wild Woman was announced as a film more than two years before its release with an initial starting date to be on August 8, 1941. Preview advertisements for the film in the trade newspapers reveal that the concept of the character was not yet fixed. One from July 29 featured a grimacing woman while a second showed a more exotic woman brandishing a knife in a jungle setting, but neither ad showcased the hybrid ape-woman concept of the final script. A second starting date with George Waggner producing was set for January 2, 1942, which also did not come to pass.

When the original script of the proposed film, which included the transplant of a living brain into an ape, was submitted for review under the Motion Picture Production Code, the Production Code Administration suggested several changes so that only a partial brain transplant would occur. The reason for the change, to which the studio did not object, was apparently to eliminate any possible implication that a human soul might transfer into an animal and violate religious doctrine.

Among the cast was John Carradine as Dr. Sigmund Walters. Director Edward Dmytryk referred to Carradine as having always been "kind of a ham" but that he "had a little talk with him and I think we got a very controlled performance out of him for a mad scientist!" The ape in the film was played by Ray "Crash" Corrigan who began his career as a stuntman with a few starring roles in serials like Undersea Kingdom and B-Westerns. Corrigan had several gorilla costumes created for him personally, as he had previously played apes in Murder in the Private Car, The Ape and would go on to do several other ape roles in the 1940s. Acquanetta, who plays Paula Dupree, was previously a model in New York after graduating high school and had a story fabricated that she was from Venezuela to hide her Arapaho background. On her way to perform in South America, she stopped over in Hollywood meeting the head of Warner Bros. and Universal, Dan Kelley and Walter Wanger respectively. She was cast in small roles in Arabian Nights and Rhythm of the Islands, while Universal presented themselves as "introducing" her in Captive Wild Woman. Acquanetta recalled that there was no preparation for her part but got along with the rest of the cast and crew, even dating director Dmytryk briefly.

The film went into production on December 10, 1942, with production halting during the December holiday season and continuing again in January. It was directed by the Canadian-born film editor turned director Edward Dmytryk. Prior to directing the film, Dmytryk worked on several B-films such as the Boris Karloff film The Devil Commands for Columbia Pictures. Dmytryk made Captive Wild Woman while being on loan from RKO Radio Pictures to Universal Pictures Company, Inc.

== Release ==
Captive Wild Woman was released on June 4, 1943. Captive Wild Woman was part of Universal's series of three films featuring Cheena, the Ape Woman. Despite being named Cheela in Captive Wild Woman, she is renamed Cheena in the subsequent films. The sequels included Jungle Woman and The Jungle Captive.

The film was released for the first time on DVD by Universal Studios on September 13, 2009, as a part of its two-disk Universal Horror: Classic Movie Archive. It was later released by Willette Acquisition Corp. on March 17, 2015. Captive Wild Woman was released on Blu-ray by Scream Factory on June 16, 2020, as the fifth volume in their Universal Horror Collection, along with Jungle Woman, The Monster and the Girl and The Jungle Captive. It features an informative audio commentary by Tom Weaver and animal trainer Dave Hodge.

== Reception ==
From contemporary reviews, Thomas M. Pryor of The New York Times wrote the film "[s]hould not let thrill-seekers down" while "there is nothing to recommend in the story or the performances....The picture as a whole is in decidedly bad taste". Wanda Hale of The New York Daily News declared the film as a "thing of horror... Unless you like pictures of this type we won't recommend Captive Wild Woman. If you do, you'll get your money's worth in thrills". A reviewer in Harrison's Reports described as "another one of those implausible horror melodramas, suitable as a supporting feature in situations where this type of entertainment is acceptable" noting that "Acquanetta, a new screen personality is effective as the ape woman. The action provides plenty of thrills and suspense".

From retrospective reviews, Dennis Schwartz from Ozus' World Movie Reviews rated the film a grade B, writing "though it clearly defies reason, the lively thriller has a fine sinister performance by Carradine and a crazy tale to spin that is strangely palpable".
