= Jungle Woman =

1944 film by Reginald LeBorg

- Theatrical release poster
- Directed by: Reginald LeBorg
- Screenplay by: Bernard L. Schubert; Henry Sucher; Edward Dein
- Story by: Henry Sucher
- Starring: Evelyn Ankers; J. Carrol Naish; Lois Collier; Milburn Stone; Douglass Dumbrille; Acquanetta
- Cinematography: Jack MacKenzie
- Edited by: Ray Snyder
- Music by: Paul Sawtell
- Production company: Universal Pictures Company, Inc.
- Distributed by: Universal Pictures Company, Inc.
- Release date: 7 July 1944
- Running time: 60 minutes
- Country: United States

Jungle Woman is a 1944 American horror film directed by Reginald LeBorg. The film stars Evelyn Ankers, J. Carrol Naish, Samuel S. Hinds, Lois Collier and Acquanetta. Jungle Woman was the second film in Universal's Cheela, the Ape Woman series, preceded by Captive Wild Woman.

== Plot ==
As a coroner and a District Attorney investigate the death of Paula Dupree, Dr. Carl Fletcher admits that he has murdered her. He expands on this death, revealing more information on the story. A flashback shows Fletcher at an opening night of the Whipple Circus where the witnesses Cheela the Gorilla's heroic act that saves the life of Fred Mason. After her supposed demise, the doctor acquires the body of the beast. He detects a heartbeat, and revives the animal. Fascinated by the creature, he purchases the late Dr. Walters' estate, hoping to find the records of his experiments. Cheela returns to human form. She is at first unable to speak and Fletcher diagnoses her condition as being due to shock. Upon the arrival of his daughter Joan and her fiancé Bob Whitney, the girl suddenly becomes verbal identifying herself as Paula. Enamored with Bob, Paula's jealous streak resurfaces. During a moonlight canoe ride, an unseen attacker capsizes Joan and Bob. Discussing the episode with Dr. Fletcher, they believe that one of the other patients Willie is responsible. Willie is then discovered to be missing.

Paula later meets with Bob in private, showing him bruises on her shoulder, injuries she claims were inflicted by Dr. Fletcher. Meanwhile, the caretaker for the estate has made the doctor aware of the vicious killing of his dog and a flock of chickens. Armed with the broken lock to the henhouse, Dr. Fletcher confiscates Paula's perfume bottle as well. After he returns to his study, Paula makes an attempt on his life. Just as he pushes her to the floor, Bob enters the room. Misunderstanding what he has seen, he takes Paula to another doctor for an examination. Dr. Fletcher has the lock and perfume bottle analyzed by a fingerprint expert, learning that although different in size, the prints do indeed match. He is now convinced that Paula and Cheela are one and the same.

Bob has Paula examined by Dr. Meredith (Pierre Watkin), who does detect mental instability and extreme physical strength. When told she is already under the care of a doctor, he admonishes the young man to return her at once to her attending physician. Arriving back at Crestview, Dr. Fletcher is met with the news that Willie's mangled body has been found. He confides in Joan what he knows about Paula, and expresses his concern for Bob. Paula and Bob return as well, and the latter finally tells her that he is going to marry Joan, which visibly angers her. Joan rushes to meet him as Paula disappears in the shadows. Learning the truth about the girl, he sends his fiancée to her cabin while he goes to the aid of Dr. Fletcher. After a search of Paula's room fails, Dr. Fletcher tells Bob to check the rest of the house. Brandishing a hypodermic needle filled with a sedative, the physician heads outside to continue his search. Paula pursues Joan through the woods to the cottage. Attempting to gain entrance, she hears the approaching Dr. Fletcher. She attacks him, and in the struggle, he accidentally administers a fatal overdose.

The flashbacks conclude and the D.A. expresses his disbelief. The Coroner parades the group, including the jury, to the morgue to re-examine the body of Paula Dupree. She is found to have reverted in death to the form of a half-human, half-ape monster. Dr. Fletcher is exonerated.

== Cast ==
Cast is sourced from the book Universal Horrors.

- Evelyn Ankers as Beth Mason
- J. Carrol Naish as Dr. Carl Fletcher
- Acquanetta as Paula Dupree
- Samuel S. Hinds as Coroner
- Lois Collier as Joan Fletcher
- Milburn Stone as Fred Mason
- Douglass Dumbrille as District Attorney
- Richard Davis as Bob Whitney
- Edward M. Hyans, Jr. as Willie
- Christian Rub as George
- Pierre Watkin as Dr. Meredith
- Nana Bryant as Miss Gray
- Alec Craig as Morgue Attendant
- Tom Keene as Joe

== Cast notes ==
Acquanetta spoke about her role in the film stating she did the film as she was "assigned to it. But once I accepted it, I did it to the best of my ability. It made money because Acquanetta was in it. I came to realize that I was the property, not the film. That's why I left Universal. I felt that I was being used". She recalled that Universal "never forgave her" for leaving as they had more films in the series in mind.

== Production ==
The film was originally titled Jungle Queen and had issues with its script as the Breen Office cited the script Edward Dein as being "unacceptable under the provisions of the Production Code by reason of a flavor of bestiality". This led to a meeting between the Breen Office, executive producer Will Cowan and Maurice Pivar was set up to tone down the more lurid implications of the screenplay. The script changes included having the character the District Attorney to not be undignified or unsympathetic and that the script made it clear that Paula Dupree was not nude when changing from her animal form to her human form. Director Reginald LeBorg stated that the film had "an atrocious script and a silly idea anyway. But again, I was under contract. If I had refused it. I would have been suspended without pay, and I wouldn't have gotten anything any more. You had to play ball with the Front Office". The authors of the book Universal Horrors stated the film was a "disguised attempt" to rewrite Cat People with a woman turning into an Ape instead of a leopard when she is sexually aroused. LeBorg commented that taking a more psychological approach to the film was "the only way to make the script palatable. I tried that especially because I think you have suspense that way [...] the story was so bad, I felt I had to do something". The film re-creates the stalking sequence from Cat People with Simone Simon stalking Jane Randolph's character down a New York street.

Filming began on February 14, 1944, at Pollard Lake for pre-production with Acquanetta. In an interview in 1984 about the film, Edward Dein didn't recall much about the production of the film, but said that "we always used old sets from other films. These jungle pictures and horror films were exploitable, so we did them. Sixty minutes was about right for a B film because they were used as filler, like newsreel". LeBorg recalled that the film was made in one week, and that most of these films were made in ten days. Studio papers indicate the film took the full 12 days to shoot.

== Release ==
Jungle Woman was released on July 7, 1944, where it was distributed by the Universal Pictures Company. It was followed by the sequel The Jungle Captive. It was released on Blu-ray by Scream Factory on June 16, 2020, as the fifth volume in their Universal Horror Collection, along with Captive Wild Woman, The Monster and the Girl and The Jungle Captive.

== Reception ==
From contemporary reviews, "Char" of Variety commented on the cast noting J. Carrol Naish had his "usual steady performance" while Samuel S. Hinds, Milburn Stone, Douglass Dumbrille, Lois Collier and Richard Davis were suitable. Frank Quinn of New York Daily Mirror found that the "story is told reasonably enough" and that "Naish turns in the most convincing performance as the puzzled medico". Kate Cameron of the New York Daily News referred to the film as a "sequel on the economic scale" noting the use of old footage and that Acquanetta acted with "a stilted air, while the other members of the cast go through their parts [...] with assurance, trying to give the absurd story a semblance of reality". The New York World-Telegram commented that "after Jungle Woman is over you may have furtive desire to turn yourself into a gorilla just once - and wreck the theater". Bosley Crowther of The New York Times declared that Universal cloaked the film with "a balther of scientific bunk..... What's Universal doing to us - trying to make monkeys of us all?"

From retrospective reviews, the authors of the book Universal Horrors stated that after spending its most excited sequence at the beginning, the film "quickly descends into unrelieved tedium" and that Jungle Woman was a "a chore to sit through even for hardcore Universal horror buffs" and is "often cited as among the worst, if not the worst of Universal's horror movies". Hans J. Stoll of AllMovie echoed this statement, stating it was a "strong contender for the title of Universal's worst horror film of the 1940s" noting that the film contained "seemingly endless "flashback" footage" and "some notoriously rotten acting".

== Retrospective appraisal ==
Film historian Wheeler W. Dixon reports that LeBorg emphatically dismissed Jungle Woman, an example of a "punishment project" imposed on him by Universal. LeBorg recalled: "I had to do it. I was under contract."

Dixon cautions that, despite LeBorg's low opinion of the picture, Jungle Woman "is actually far more interesting than LeBorg was willing to admit." The handling of the material suggests that LeBorg went to great lengths to endow the project with a measure of "nuance" and "visual flair." Despite his efforts, Jungle Woman exhibits "extremely cheap production values." Dixon adds that Lon Chaney Jr. delivered his most "disciplined performances" under LeBorg's direction.

Ironically, some of these features, produced to fill the "bottom half of Universal's double feature packages." are more popular in retrospectives of LeBorg's work.
