= Jack Ross (Arizona politician) =

Arizona businessman and politician (1927–2013)

Norman "Jack" Ross (April 3, 1927 – January 13, 2013) was an Arizona car dealer, philanthropist and politician who twice sought the Democratic nomination for Governor of Arizona. He was the husband of movie star Acquanetta.

== Early life and education ==
Ross was born April 3, 1927, in Chicago, Illinois, the eldest of three children of Norman A. Ross, M.D., and Edna Ross. At 17, Ross enlisted in the U.S. Army which sent him to Stanford University, where he studied engineering and graduated from the Army's accelerated training program. He was deployed to Europe. Ross later received his B.A. from USC.

Ross married movie star Acquanetta, the couple lived in Mesa, Arizona, and she appeared with Ross in his local television advertisements, and also by hosting a local television show called Acqua's Corner that accompanied the Friday late-night movies. The couple had four children, and divorced in the 1980s.

== Business and philanthropy ==
After working for the Packard Motor Company as their youngest vice president, Ross opened Jack Ross Lincoln Mercury in Mesa, Arizona. Ross became iconic in Arizona for his commercials using the song "They always call him Mr. Touchdown," and often included a promotion like "Buy a car, get a trunk load of groceries." Ross sold his business to Earnhardt Auto Centers in 2005. Ross was honored as Time Magazine's "Automobile Dealer of The Year."

In addition to cars, Ross was a major land developer, responsible for creating the planned community of Winslow West. Ross also owned the 5,000 acre Chino Grande Ranch in Yavapai County.

Ross and Acquanetta were prominent citizens, donating to the Phoenix Symphony and the construction of Mesa Lutheran Hospital and founding Stagebrush Theatre.

Ross was an environmentalist who owned the Mesa Grande ruins with his wife before they sold it to the city in 1987 to become a cultural park. He also donated the abandoned Oro Belle mine to the Arizona Historical Society.

== Politics ==
A Democrat, Ross twice ran for Governor of Arizona, losing in 1970 and 1974.

In the 1970 election "Ross had the advantages of name identification and a well-financed campaign organization. However, some voters continued to perceive him as a used car salesman, despite his serious effort to address his image in the actual primary campaign." His major opponent, former Ambassador Raúl Castro, entered the primary late, with very little money or organization, making Castro's win "astounding." On election day Ross took second with 25.4% of the votes.

In 1974, Ross launched a second bid for governor. During Ross' second campaign his priorities were "reorganization of state government, reduction in size of state government, statewide ecological land use plan, law and order (curtailment of drugs and control of crime), reorganization of welfare program, lower taxes on all levels and eliminate sales tax on food" Ross lost again to Castro, taking 18.2% of the vote.
