= Jungle Captive =

1945 film by Harold Young

The Jungle Captive
- Theatrical release poster
- Directed by: Harold Young
- Screenplay by: Dwight V. Babcock; M. Coates Webster
- Starring: Otto Kruger; Amelita Ward; Phil Brown; Vicky Lane; Rondo Hatton
- Cinematography: Maury Gertsman; Charles van Enger
- Edited by: Fred R. Feitshans Jr.
- Production company: Universal Pictures Company, Inc.
- Distributed by: Universal Pictures Company, Inc.
- Release date: 29 July 1945
- Running time: 63 minutes
- Country: United States

The Jungle Captive is a 1945 American horror film directed by Harold Young. The film is a sequel to Jungle Woman (1944), which had been preceded by Captive Wild Woman and is the final film in the Cheela, the Ape Woman series. Jungle Captive features Otto Kruger, Amelita Ward, and Rondo Hatton (as a character named "Moloch"). Vicky Lane plays Paula Dupree/Cheela, the Ape Woman.

== Plot ==
The film begins in the laboratory of the eminent biochemist Mr. Stendahl. As his assistants, Ann Forester and Don Young observe, he successfully concludes an experiment to restore life to a dead rabbit. Meanwhile, at the city morgue, Moloch arrives to claim the body of the now-dead Ape Woman. The inquisitive attendant begins checking his credentials and is strangled for his efforts. Moloch escapes unseen with his quarry in a stolen ambulance. He arrives at a desolate house and carries his cargo inside.

The police, led by Inspector Harrigan manage to discover a clue, a medical smock. They trace it to Mr. Stendahl's lab, where Harrigan finds that it belongs to Don. Ann, present during his questioning, offers a fake alibi to cover for her fiancé. Stendahl later abducts Ann and transports her to his secret lab, that contains Moloch and the body of the Ape Woman. He plans to use a portion of Ann's blood to revive the creature. Moloch, enamored with the pretty new houseguest, becomes very protective of her. With her blood, the biochemist is successful in restoring life to the beast. In order to fully prove his theory, he knows he will need to convert her to human form. He sends Moloch to secure the records of the late Dr. Walters, which remain in the possession of Dr. Fletcher. A later dialog exchange reveals that the hapless Fletcher was killed during the theft.

Armed with the recorded knowledge gathered by Dr. Walters, Stendahl uses glandular secretions from his captive lab assistant to complete the Ape Woman's metamorphosis. However, the brain of his subject has been damaged and possesses only animal instincts. He determines that a new brain is needed, and decides to use Ann as a donor.

Stendahl departs for his downtown lab, and the now very human Ape Woman wanders away. Moloch cannot locate her on the grounds and goes to Stendahl's office in search of his boss. He finds Don there, but is informed that Stendahl is out. Don notices that Moloch is wearing a fraternity pin that he had given to Ann. He trails Moloch back to the Old Orchard Road house and is captured by Moloch and Stendahl there.

After binding Don to a chair, Stendahl and Moloch attempt to locate the missing Ape Woman. While they are engaged in their search, Don frees himself and tries to escape with Ann. Stendahl and Moloch thwart his efforts and return them to the laboratory. The police make a search of Stendahl's downtown office at the Medical Building. Harrigan finds a utility bill receipt, indicating an Old Orchard Road address, paid by the biochemist. Remembering that the wrecked ambulance was discovered near there, he decides to follow up on the lead.

Don, tied once again to a chair, is forced to watch as Stendahl prepares for his next operation. When Don explains to Moloch that the brain transplant will result in Ann's death, the once-loyal henchman turns on his boss. Stendahl guns him down. Unbeknownst to the scientist, the gunfire causes the Ape Woman to revert to her beastly form. As he continues his preparations, the creature rises from the table and attacks him. With the scientist disposed of, she turns her attention toward the helpless Ann, but is in turn shot by the arriving Harrigan in the nick of time. The film ends with Don and Ann being pulled over by the police and presented with a subpoena for them to appear at the magistrate's office. A closer examination of the document reveals the purpose; to pick up their wedding gift from Harrigan.

== Cast ==
- Otto Kruger as Mr. Stendahl
- Amelita Ward as Ann Forrester
- Phil Brown as Don Young
- Jerome Cowan as Insp. W.L. Harrigan
- Rondo Hatton as Moloch, the brute
- Eddie Acuff as Bill, morgue wagon attendant
- Ernie Adams as Jim, morgue wagon attendant
- Charles Wagenheim as Fred, first morgue attendant
- Eddy Chandler as Motorcycle Cop
- Jack Overman as Detective at Lab
- Vicky Lane as Paula Dupree/Cheela, the Ape Woman

== Production ==
Betty Bryant was signed by Universal to a term contract and was originally chosen for the role of the female lead in The Jungle Captive. One day before production began on the film on August 30, 1944, she told the associate producer of the film Morgan B. Cox that she did not know if she could find a babysitter for her 2-year old on certain nights of scheduled work. On the first day of shooting she came in unprepared and on the second day she appeared 40 minutes late. By September, she had been removed from the film. The role was replaced by Amelita Ward. Production went over schedule by two days, and ended officially on September 16.

== Release ==
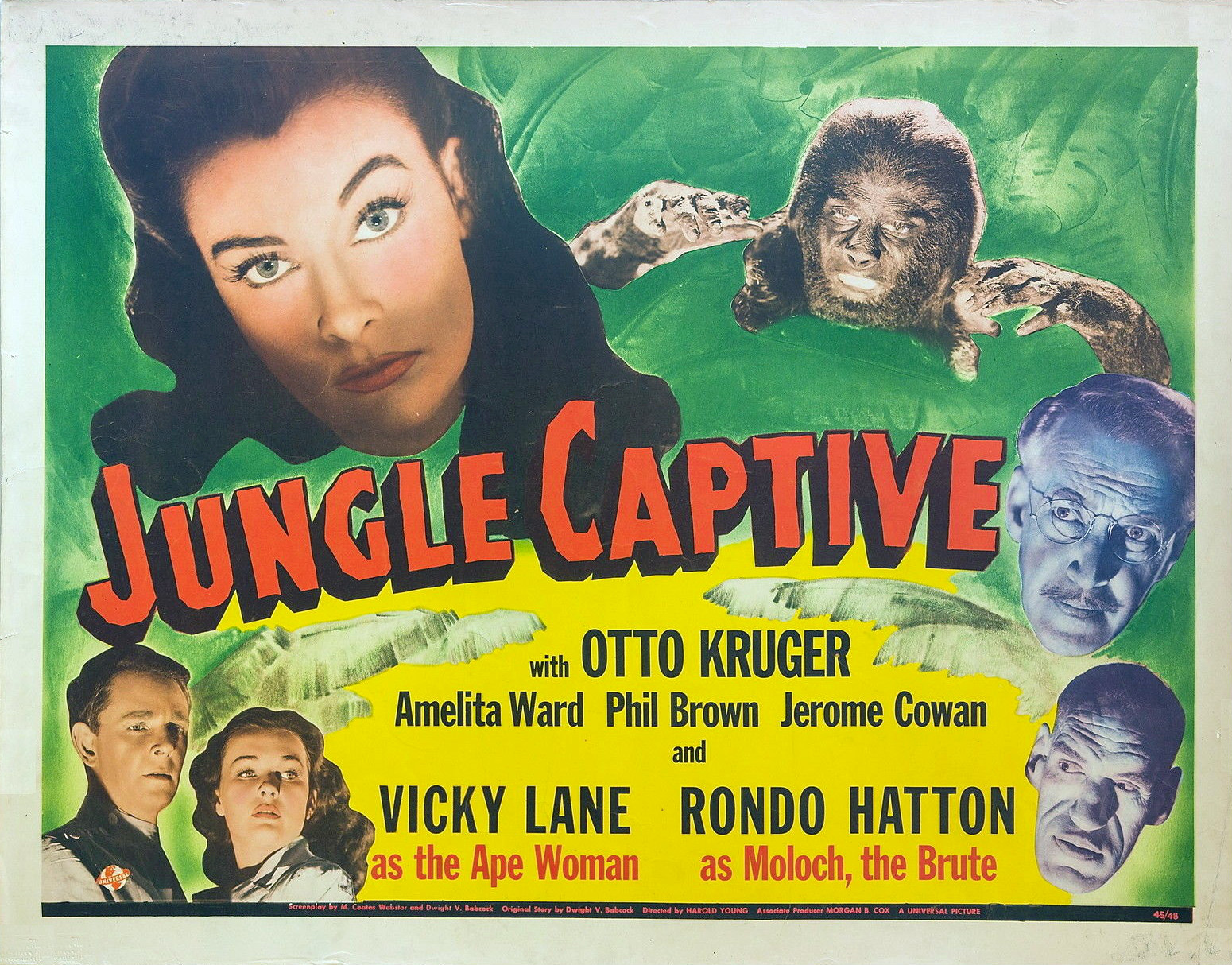
Poster for Jungle Captive

The Jungle Captive was released on June 29, 1945. It was re-released under the title Wild Jungle Captive. The Jungle Captive was released on Blu-ray by Scream Factory on June 16, 2020, as the fifth volume in their Universal Horror Collection, along with Captive Wild Woman, The Monster and the Girl and Jungle Woman.

== Reception ==
From contemporary reviews, Bert McCord wrote in New York Herald Tribune that "I have come to the unalterable conviction that I just don't like motion pictures in which a fanatical doctor disinters werewolves wolf-men troglodytes and the like to bring them back to life with dire results [...] even if they were good. I wouldn't like them. But there is no danger of that in the case of Jungle Captive". The American Legion Auxiliary dismissed it as "worthless and gruesome". In The New York Times, Joelyn R. Littaure commented that Vicky Lane "plays the brainless woman with monosyllabic finesse" and "she grunts and growls as though she thought the whole business to be as stupid as it actually is".

From retrospective reviews, an anonymous reviewer in Fangoria in 1999 wrote that "Jungle Captive is superior to Jungle Woman, but only in the way that one puncutred lung is superior to two". In 1962, Joe Dante included the film in his list of worst horror films list in Famous Monsters. Dante stated that although Otto Kruger gave a good performance, the film "as a whole should have been better, went off the deep end too often".
