= 1974 Arizona gubernatorial election =

- November 5, 1974
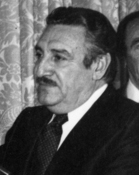

| Nominee | Raúl Héctor Castro | Russell Williams |
| Party | Democratic | Republican |
| Popular vote | 278,375 | 273,674 |
| Percentage | 50.41% | 49.56% |
- County results Castro: 50–60% 60–70% Williams: 50–60%
Governor before election
Jack Williams
Republican
Elected Governor
Raúl Héctor Castro
Democratic

The 1974 Arizona gubernatorial election took place on November 5, 1974. Incumbent Governor Jack Williams decided not to run for a fourth term as governor. Former United States Ambassador to Bolivia Raúl Héctor Castro, who was the Democratic nominee in 1970, won the Democratic nomination again in 1974, and narrowly won the general election, defeating Republican nominee Russell Williams by 0.85%. Castro was sworn into his first and only term as governor on January 6, 1975.

Prior to the election, there was a recall effort led by Cesar Chavez against incumbent Governor Jack Williams, with 180,000 signatures submitted. Many of the signatures were invalidated by Attorney General Gary Nelson, but this was eventually overturned. By the time this occurred, however, it was meaningless due to the close proximity of the 1974 gubernatorial election, and thus a recall election did not occur.

Approximately two years into his term as governor, Castro would resign to become United States ambassador to Argentina.

== Republican primary ==
=== Candidates ===
- John D. Driggs, mayor of Phoenix
- Milton H. Graham, former mayor of Phoenix
- William C. Jacquin, president of the State Senate
- Evan Mecham, former state senator, former nominee for U.S. Senate
- Russell Williams, member of the Arizona Corporation Commission

=== Results ===
Republican primary results
| Party | Candidate | Votes | % |
|---|---|---|---|
| Republican | Russell Williams | 53,132 | 35.57% |
| Republican | Evan Mecham | 30,266 | 20.26% |
| Republican | William C. Jacquin | 27,138 | 18.17% |
| Republican | John D. Driggs | 23,519 | 15.75% |
| Republican | Milton H. Graham | 15,315 | 10.25% |
| Total votes | | 149,370 | 100.00% |

== Democratic primary ==
=== Candidates ===
- Raúl Héctor Castro, former United States ambassador to Bolivia, Democratic nominee for governor in 1970
- Walter "Denver" Caudill, Tubac Country Club golf professional
- Dave Moss, real estate broker
- Jack Ross, car dealer

=== Results ===
Democratic primary results
| Party | Candidate | Votes | % |
|---|---|---|---|
| Democratic | Raúl Héctor Castro | 115,268 | 67.21% |
| Democratic | Jack Ross | 31,250 | 18.22% |
| Democratic | Dave Moss | 19,143 | 11.16% |
| Democratic | Walter "Denver" Caudill | 5,843 | 3.41% |
| Total votes | | 171,504 | 100.00% |

== General election ==
=== Results ===
Arizona gubernatorial election, 1974
| Party | Candidate | Votes | % | ±% |
|---|---|---|---|---|
| Democratic | Raúl Héctor Castro | 278,375 | 50.41% | +1.30% |
| Republican | Russell Williams | 273,674 | 49.56% | −1.33% |
| Independent | Russell Shaw (write-in) | 149 | 0.03% | |
| Independent | Harold Bates (write-in) | 4 | 0.00% | |
| Majority | | 4,701 | 0.85% | |
| Total votes | | 552,202 | 100.00% | |
| Democratic gain from Republican | | Swing | +2.63% | |

=== Results by county ===
| County | Raúl Héctor Castro Democratic | | Russell Williams Republican | | Russell Shaw Write-in | | Harold Bates Write-in | | Margin | | Total votes cast |
| County | # | % | # | % | # | % | # | % | # | % | Total votes cast |
|---|---|---|---|---|---|---|---|---|---|---|---|
| Apache | 4,482 | 69.11% | 2,003 | 30.89% | 0 | 0.00% | 0 | 0.00% | 2,479 | 38.23% | 6,485 |
| Cochise | 8,779 | 53.28% | 7,695 | 46.70% | 2 | 0.01% | 0 | 0.00% | 1,084 | 6.58% | 16,476 |
| Coconino | 9,601 | 59.69% | 6,483 | 40.30% | 1 | 0.01% | 0 | 0.00% | 3,118 | 19.38% | 16,085 |
| Gila | 5,056 | 55.73% | 4,015 | 44.26% | 1 | 0.01% | 0 | 0.00% | 1,041 | 11,47% | 9,072 |
| Graham | 2,379 | 46.19% | 2,772 | 53.81% | 0 | 0.00% | 0 | 0.00% | -393 | -7.63% | 5,151 |
| Greenlee | 2,262 | 61.82% | 1,397 | 38.18% | 0 | 0.00% | 0 | 0.00% | 865 | 23.64% | 3,659 |
| Maricopa | 139,222 | 44.84% | 171,111 | 55.11% | 135 | 0.04% | 4 | 0.00% | -31,889 | -10.27% | 310,472 |
| Mohave | 4,623 | 50.92% | 4,449 | 49.00% | 7 | 0.08% | 0 | 0.00% | 174 | 1.92% | 9,079 |
| Navajo | 6,440 | 56.80% | 4,899 | 43.20% | 0 | 0.00% | 0 | 0.00% | 1,541 | 13.59% | 11,339 |
| Pima | 70,919 | 61.73% | 43,962 | 38.27% | 0 | 0.00% | 0 | 0.00% | 26,957 | 23.47% | 114,881 |
| Pinal | 9,405 | 56.52% | 7,235 | 43.48% | 0 | 0.00% | 0 | 0.00% | 2,170 | 13.04% | 16,640 |
| Santa Cruz | 2,238 | 66.37% | 1,134 | 33.63% | 0 | 0.00% | 0 | 0.00% | 1,104 | 32.74% | 3,372 |
| Yavapai | 7,148 | 43.10% | 9,432 | 56.88% | 3 | 0.02% | 0 | 0.00% | -2,284 | -13.77% | 16,583 |
| Yuma | 5,821 | 45.10% | 7,087 | 54.90% | 0 | 0.00% | 0 | 0.00% | -1,266 | -9.81% | 12,908 |
| Totals | 278,375 | 50.41% | 273,674 | 49.56% | 149 | 0.03% | 4 | 0.00% | 4,701 | 0.85% | 552,202 |

==== Counties that flipped from Republican to Democratic ====
- Apache
- Mohave
- Navajo

==== Counties that flipped from Democratic to Republican ====
- Graham
- Yuma
