= 1970 Arizona gubernatorial election =

- November 3, 1970
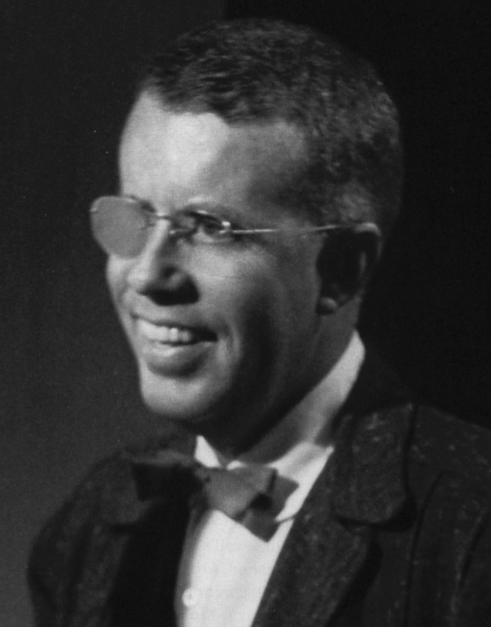

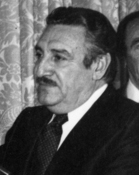
Nominee	Jack Williams	Raúl Héctor Castro
Party	Republican	Democratic
Popular vote	209,355	202,053
Percentage	50.89%	49.11%
- County results Williams: 50–60% 60–70% Castro: 50–60% 60–70% 70–80%
Governor before election
Jack Williams
Republican
Elected Governor
Jack Williams
Republican

The 1970 Arizona gubernatorial election took place on November 3, 1970. Incumbent Governor Jack Williams ran for reelection to a third term as governor. United States Ambassador to Bolivia Raúl Héctor Castro won the Democratic nomination, and narrowly lost the general election to Williams by 1.78%. Williams was sworn into his third and final term as Governor on January 5, 1971.

Due to a constitutional amendment approved by the voters in 1968, the length of the term of Governor of Arizona was changed from two years to four years, effective with the 1970 gubernatorial election. Thus, Williams became the first Governor of Arizona to serve a 4-year term.

== Republican primary ==
=== Candidates ===
- Jack Williams, incumbent Governor

=== Results ===
Republican primary results
Party	Candidate	Votes	%
Republican	Jack Williams	77,259	100.00%
Total votes		77,259	100.00%

== Democratic primary ==
=== Candidates ===
- Raúl Héctor Castro, United States Ambassador to Bolivia, former United States Ambassador to El Salvador
- Jack Ross, car dealer
- George Nader, former Mayor

=== Results ===
Democratic primary results
Party	Candidate	Votes	%
Democratic	Raúl Héctor Castro	63,294	51.99%
Democratic	Jack Ross	30,921	25.40%
Democratic	George Nader	27,534	22.62%
Total votes		121,749	100.00%

== General election ==
=== Results ===
Arizona gubernatorial election, 1970
Party	Candidate	Votes	%	±%
Republican	Jack Williams (incumbent)	209,356	50.89%	−6.95%
Democratic	Raúl Héctor Castro	202,053	49.11%	+6.95%
Majority		7,303	1.78%	
Total votes		411,409	100.00%	
Republican hold		Swing	-13.90%	

=== Results by county ===
County	Jack Williams Republican		Raúl Héctor Castro Democratic		Margin		Total votes cast
County	#	%	#	%	#	%	Total votes cast
Apache	1,745	50.89%	1,684	49.11%	61	1.78%	3,429
Cochise	5,712	41.24%	8,138	58.76%	-2,426	-17.52%	13,850
Coconino	4,305	49.05%	4,471	50.95%	-166	-1.89%	8,776
Gila	2,951	37.55%	4,907	62.45%	-1,956	-24.89%	7,858
Graham	2,078	47.00%	2,343	53.00%	-265	-5.99%	4,421
Greenlee	822	26.85%	2,239	73.15%	-1,417	-46.29%	3,061
Maricopa	133,336	58.01%	96,525	41.99%	36,811	16.01%	229,861
Mohave	2,846	50.43%	2,797	49.57%	49	0.87%	5,643
Navajo	4,335	56.56%	3,330	43.44%	1,005	13.11%	7,665
Pima	32,750	37.22%	55,245	62.78%	-22,495	-25.56%	87,995
Pinal	5,786	42.40%	7,861	57.60%	-2,075	-15.20%	13,647
Santa Cruz	824	27.96%	2,123	72.04%	-1,299	-44.08%	2,947
Yavapai	7,052	63.28%	4,093	36.72%	2,959	26.55%	11,145
Yuma	4,814	43.33%	6,297	56.67%	-1,483	-13.35%	11,111
Totals	209,356	50.89%	202,053	49.11%	7,303	1.78%	411,409

==== Counties that flipped from Democratic to Republican ====
- Apache

==== Counties that flipped from Republican to Democratic ====
- Coconino
