= Henry Clive =

Australian-American graphic artist (1883–1960)

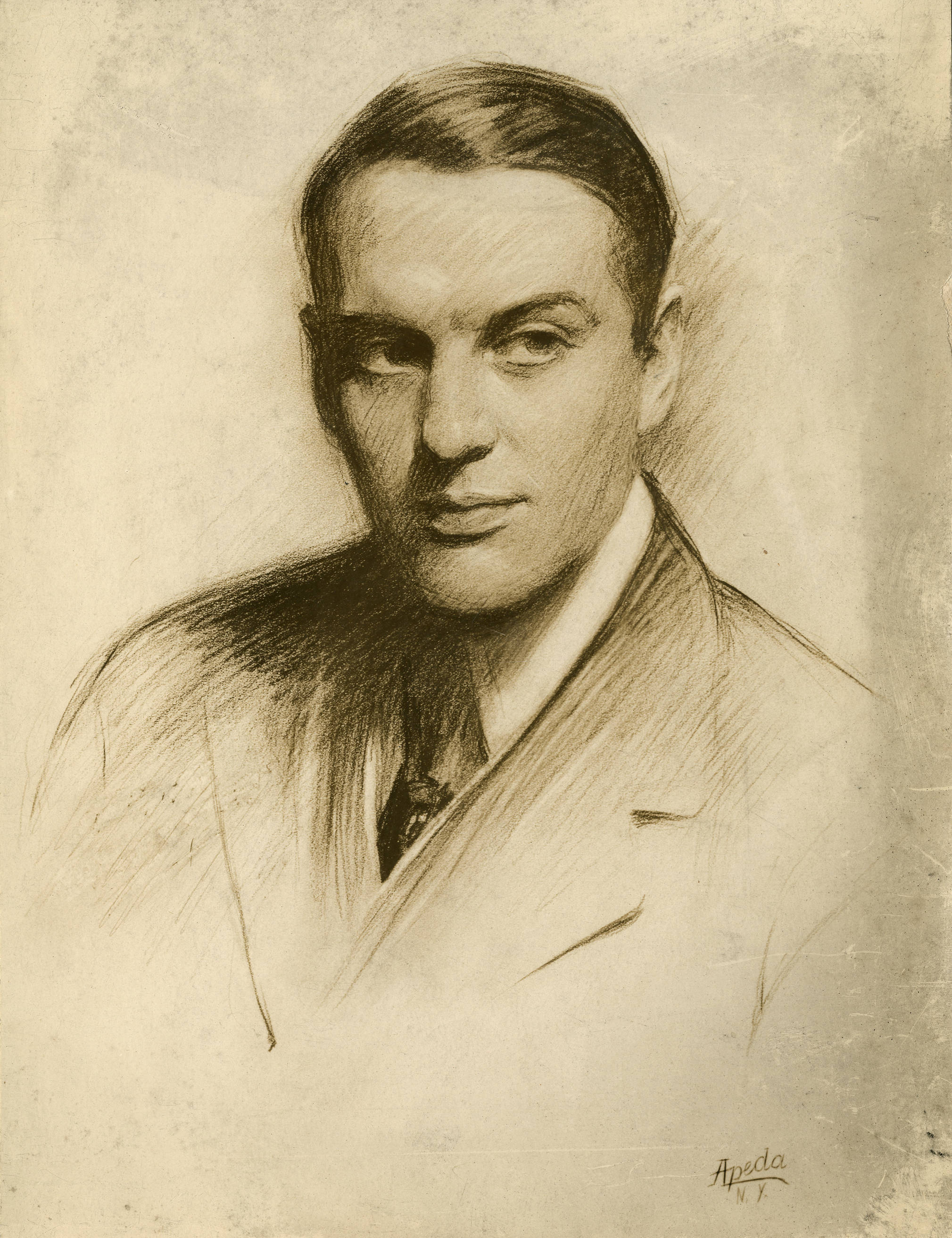
Sketch of Clive, 1911

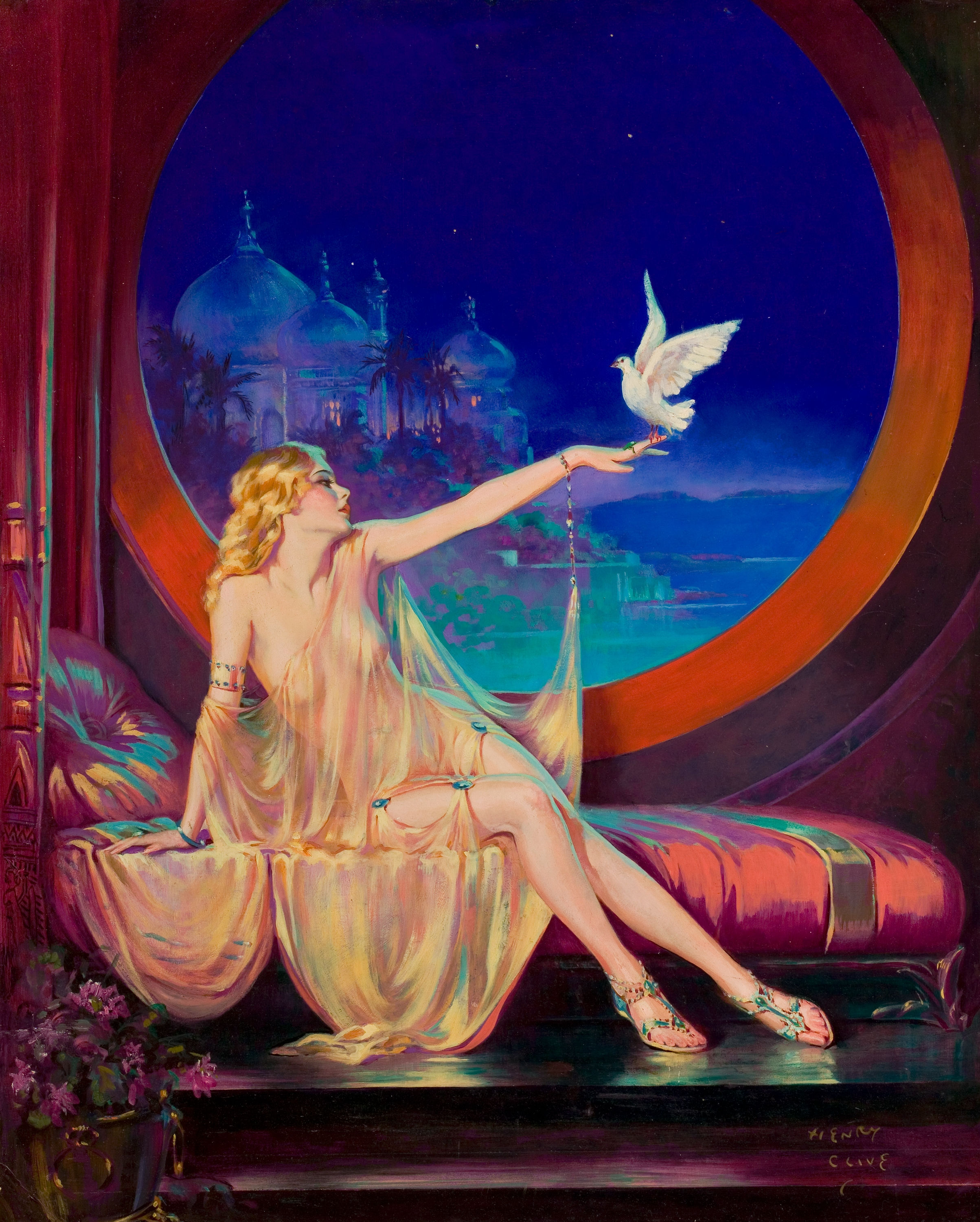
Sultana by Henry Clive

Henry Clive (born Clive O'Hara, October 3, 1883–December 12, 1960) was an Australian-born magician, actor, graphic artist and illustrator who created illustrations for The American Weekly and cover series, which were posed for by screen celebrities.

== Life and works ==
Clive was born in Melbourne, Australia, the son of a prominent doctor, and spent his childhood on a sheep ranch outside Melbourne. As Clive O'Hara he became well-known as a magician; Melbourne Punch said in 1900 that "as an amateur young O'Hara has paralysed audiences around Melbourne by the dexterity of his card tricks and the weirdness of his experiments." In 1913 the same magazine told readers that:

Mr. Clive O'Hara, now known as Henry Clive, after a highly successful season in America, left New York last month for a seven months' vaudeville season with a new act of his own designing! As a hobby, Mr. O'Hara has taken up oil painting, in which he shows remarkable results after two years' study.

1913 was also the year that Clive was appearing as a 'Burlesque Conjuror' at the London Opera House. In later years Clive moved to Hollywood, acted in silent films, became an art director for First National Pictures and went on to work in Charlie Chaplin's productions for United Artists, including City Lights. Clive was chosen by Chaplin to play the part of the millionaire in the film, but was fired during production for refusing to jump into cold water and replaced by Harry C. Myers.

Clive married Helen Sevilla Cunningham in New York in 1922, claiming he had done so as Cunningham had "the most beautiful nose in the world". Cunningham had previously worked as a model and it was reputed the two met when Clive painted her portrait and each divorced their spouses and were married a fortnight later. However, Clive had also been judge in a beauty contest which Cunningham won in December 1921. Their daughter Helen O'Hara was born on 8 November 1922. Helen O'Hara would go on to play minor roles in Hollywood films in the 1940s.

In 1950, Clive married former actress Acquanetta who then returned to acting for several years. When she retired from the movies in 1953, she became a disk jockey for radio station KPOL (AM) in Los Angeles.

Clive's 1925 Art Deco illustration Sultana for the Louis F. Dow Calendar Company was once sold for $22,705. Housed in the Estate of Charles Martignette, in 2010 Sultana was put on sale again at Heritage Auctions. Sultana was reproduced in The Great American Pin-Up by Charles G. Martignette and Louis K. Meisel.

== Selected filmography ==
- Fighting Odds (1917)
- On the Jump (1918)
