= 1968 United States gubernatorial elections =

- November 5, 1968

22 governorships 21 states; 1 territory
	Majority party	Minority party
Party	Republican	Democratic
Seats before	26	24
Seats after	31	19
Seat change	▲5	▼5
Seats up	8	13
Seats won	13	8
- Democratic hold Democratic gain Republican hold Republican gain No election

United States gubernatorial elections were held on 5 November 1968, in 21 states and one territory, concurrent with the House, Senate elections and presidential election. These were the last gubernatorial elections for Arizona, New Mexico, and Wisconsin to take place in a presidential election year, as all would extend their governors' terms from two to four years.

== Race summary ==
State	Governor	Party	First elected	Status	Candidates
Arizona	Jack Williams	Republican	1966	Incumbent re-elected.	▌ ✓ Jack Williams (Republican) 57.8%; ▌Sam Goddard Jr. (Democratic) 42.2%
Arkansas	Winthrop Rockefeller	Republican	1966	Incumbent re-elected.	▌ ✓ Winthrop Rockefeller (Republican) 52.4%; ▌Marion H. Crank (Democratic) 47.6%
Delaware	Charles L. Terry Jr.	Democratic	1964	Incumbent lost re-election. Republican gain.	▌ ✓ Russell W. Peterson (Republican) 50.51%; ▌ Charles L. Terry Jr. (Democratic) 49.49%
Illinois	Samuel H. Shapiro	Democratic	1968 (Note: Shapiro became governor on May 21, 1968, when predecessor (Otto Kerner Jr.) resigned.)	Incumbent lost re-election. Republican gain.	▌ ✓ Richard B. Ogilvie (Republican) 51.2%; ▌ Samuel H. Shapiro (Democratic) 48.4%; ▌ Edward C. Gross (Socialist Labor) 0.4%
Indiana	Roger D. Branigin	Democratic	1964	Incumbent term-limited. Republican gain.	▌ ✓ Edgar Whitcomb (Republican) 52.7%; ▌ Robert L. Rock (Democratic) 47.1%; ▌ Melvin E. Hawk (Prohibition) 0.15%
Iowa	Harold Hughes	Democratic	1962	Incumbent retired. Republican gain.	▌ ✓ Robert D. Ray (Republican) 54.1%; ▌ Paul Franzenburg (Democratic) 45.9%; ▌Harry Miller (Prohibition) 0.08%
Kansas	Robert Docking	Democratic	1966	Incumbent re-elected.	▌ ✓ Robert Docking (Democratic) 51.9%; ▌Rick Harman (Republican) 47.6%; ▌Marshall Uncapher (Prohibition) 0.5%
Missouri	Warren E. Hearnes	Democratic	1964	Incumbent re-elected.	▌ ✓ Warren E. Hearnes (Democratic) 60.8%; ▌ Lawrence K. Roos (Republican) 39.2%
Montana	Tim Babcock	Republican	1962 (Note: Babcock became governor in 1962 when predecessor (Donald Grant Nutter) died.)	Incumbent lost re-election. Democratic gain.	▌ ✓ Forrest H. Anderson (Democratic) 54.1%; ▌ Tim Babcock (Republican) 41.9%; ▌ Wayne Montgomery (New Reform) 4.0%
New Hampshire	John W. King	Democratic	1962	Incumbent retired. Republican gain.	▌ ✓ Walter R. Peterson Jr. (Republican) 52.5%; ▌ Emile R. Bussiere (Democratic) 47.4%
New Mexico	David Cargo	Republican	1966	Incumbent re-elected.	▌ ✓ David Cargo (Republican) 50.21%; ▌Fabian Chavez Jr. (Democratic) 49.29%; ▌ Jose Maestes (People's Constitutional) 0.48%
North Carolina	Dan K. Moore	Democratic	1964	Incumbent term-limited. Democratic hold.	▌ ✓ Robert W. Scott (Democratic) 52.7%; ▌ Jim Gardner (Republican) 47.3%
North Dakota	William L. Guy	Democratic-NPL	1960	Incumbent re-elected.	▌ ✓ William L. Guy (Democratic-NPL) 54.8%; ▌ Robert P. McCarney (Republican) 43.7%; ▌ Leo Landsberger (Taxpayers Revival Ticket) 1.5%
Rhode Island	John Chafee	Republican	1962	Incumbent lost re-election. Democratic gain.	▌ ✓ Frank Licht (Democratic) 51.0%; ▌ John Chafee (Republican) 49.0%
South Dakota	Nils Boe	Republican	1964	Incumbent retired. Republican hold.	▌ ✓ Frank Farrar (Republican) 57.7%; ▌ Robert Chamberlin (Democratic) 42.4%
Texas	John Connally	Democratic	1962	Incumbent retired. Democratic hold.	▌ ✓ Preston Smith (Democratic) 57.0%; ▌ Paul Eggers (Republican) 43.0%
Utah	Cal Rampton	Democratic	1964	Incumbent re-elected	▌ ✓ Cal Rampton (Democratic) 68.7%; ▌ Carl W. Buehner (Republican) 31.3%
Vermont	Philip H. Hoff	Democratic	1962	Incumbent retired. Republican gain.	▌ ✓ Deane C. Davis (Republican) 55.5%; ▌ John J. Daley (Democratic) 44.5%
Washington	Daniel J. Evans	Republican	1964	Incumbent re-elected.	▌ ✓ Daniel J. Evans (Republican) 54.7%; ▌ John J. O'Connell (Democratic) 44.3%; ▌ Ken Chriswell (Conservative) 0.9%; ▌ Henry Killman (Socialist Labor) 0.1
West Virginia	Hulett C. Smith	Democratic	1964	Incumbent term-limited. Republican gain.	▌ ✓ Arch A. Moore Jr. (Republican) 50.9%; ▌ James Marshall Sprouse (Democratic) 49.1%
Wisconsin	Warren P. Knowles	Republican	1964	Incumbent re-elected.	▌ ✓ Warren P. Knowles (Republican) 52.9%; ▌ Bronson La Follette (Democratic) 46.8%; ▌ Adolf Wiggert (Socialist Labor) 0.2%; ▌ Robert Wilkinson (Socialist Workers) 0.1%

== Closest races ==
States where the margin of victory was under 5%:

1. New Mexico, 0.92%
2. Delaware, 1.02%
3. West Virginia, 1.08%
4. Rhode Island, 2.04%
5. Illinois, 2.84%
6. Kansas, 4.24%
7. Arkansas, 4.86%

States where the margin of victory was under 10%:

1. New Hampshire, 5.09%
2. North Carolina, 5.40%
3. Indiana, 5.59%
4. Wisconsin, 6.06%
5. Iowa, 8.20%

Red denotes states won by Republicans. Blue denotes states won by Democrats.

== Arizona ==
Jack Richard Williams won re-election against Samuel Pearson Goddard Jr., in a "rematch" election, in which Goddard was trying to get his old job back. This was basically a repeat of the 1966 Arizona governor's race, with Williams winning.

== Arkansas ==
Winthrop Rockefeller had already made his mark in 1966, when he was elected as the first Republican governor since 1872 and having the black vote to boot, not to mention challenging the Faubus empire two years before in 1964. Getting re-elected in 1968 was good, but things for Rockefeller went downhill from there.

== Delaware ==
Terry not wanting to take the National Guard out of the black communities in Wilmington played a factor in his defeat, not to mention that Peterson had made it. Peterson would go on to be a legend in Delaware politics in a short time, mainly for his "green" politics.

== Illinois ==
Samuel H. Shapiro was governor temporarily after Otto Kerner Jr. resigned in order to accept appointment to the federal appellate court. Shapiro lost the race to get his own full term. Kerner would become famous for two things: being the head of the National Advisory Commission on Civil Disorders, a.k.a. the Kerner Commission, and going to jail over various charges stemming from being a stockholder in a racetrack business.

== Indiana ==
Indiana changed its laws so that governors could have two back-to-back four-year terms beginning in November 1972. Thus, Branigin was not eligible for a second term.

== Iowa ==
Harold Hughes resigned on January 1, 1969, to run for United States Senate. Robert D. Fulton would serve as governor from January 1 to January 16, 1969, when the new Governor, Robert D. Ray took office. Ray would go on to a political career, while Hughes, inspired by his own battles with alcoholism, made drug/alcohol abuse his focus in the Senate, and later left politics to open an alcoholism treatment center and to do religious work.

== Kansas ==
George Docking won re-election. Ultimately, he would set a record by winning four two-year terms. Kansas governors served two-year terms until 1974, when a constitutional amendment was added, creating a four-year term system.

== Missouri ==
In Missouri, during Warren Hearnes' term, the laws were changed so that governors were allowed two back-to-back four-year terms. Thus, by 1968, Hearnes was eligible for another term.

== Montana ==
Tim Babcock became governor in January 1962 after his predecessor, Governor Donald Nutter, was killed in a plane crash. Babcock won a full term in the 1964 gubernatorial election.

== New Hampshire ==
King might have run for another term had the 1968 presidential election not gotten in his way. He was an avid President Lyndon B. Johnson supporter, and a "hawk" on Vietnam. So, when Senator Eugene McCarthy dropped into New Hampshire, King didn't hold back, but his attacks didn't work. President Johnson dropped out of the presidential race, and Vice President Hubert Humphrey joined the race as a result and asked King to run for the Senate. King did, but lost to Republican Norris Cotton.

== New Mexico ==
David Cargo was re-elected in 1968. Being term-limited in 1970 (see 1970 United States gubernatorial elections), he tried running for other offices, but "Lonesome Dave" never won again.

== North Carolina ==
In North Carolina, governors were not allowed two consecutive terms until 1977.

== North Dakota ==
Governors served two-year terms until 1964, when a constitutional amendment changed it to a four-year term.

== West Virginia ==
In 1970, during Arch Moore’s term, an amendment to the West Virginia constitution allowed governors to serve two consecutive terms. Thus, Hulett Smith was not eligible for a second term.

== See also ==
- 1968 United States elections
  - 1968 United States presidential election
  - 1968 United States Senate elections
  - 1968 United States House of Representatives elections
