= Darrell F. Smith =

American politician (1927– 2013)

16th Attorney General of Arizona
- In office January 4, 1965 – July 1, 1968
- Governor: Samuel Pearson Goddard Jr. Jack Williams
- Preceded by: Robert Pickrell
- Succeeded by: Gary K. Nelson

Personal details
- Born: Darrell Fenwick Smith; February 13, 1927 Provo, Utah, U.S.
- Died: June 5, 2013 (aged 86)
- Party: Republican
- Education: American University (LLB)

Darrell Fenwick Smith (February 13, 1927 – June 5, 2013) was an American politician who served as the Attorney General of Arizona from 1965 to 1968.

On 26 January 1967 Smith spoke to the Arizona House of Representatives to explain why legislation was necessary to combat consumer fraud, and endorsed the Arizona Consumer Fraud Act. The legislation was passed as an emergency measure, and signed into law by Governor Jack Williams 6 weeks later.

He died on June 5, 2013, at age 86.
