= 1968 Alabama Democratic presidential primary =

- May 7, 1968; June 4, 1968 (runoff)

50 Democratic National Convention delegates (45 pledged, 5 unpledged)
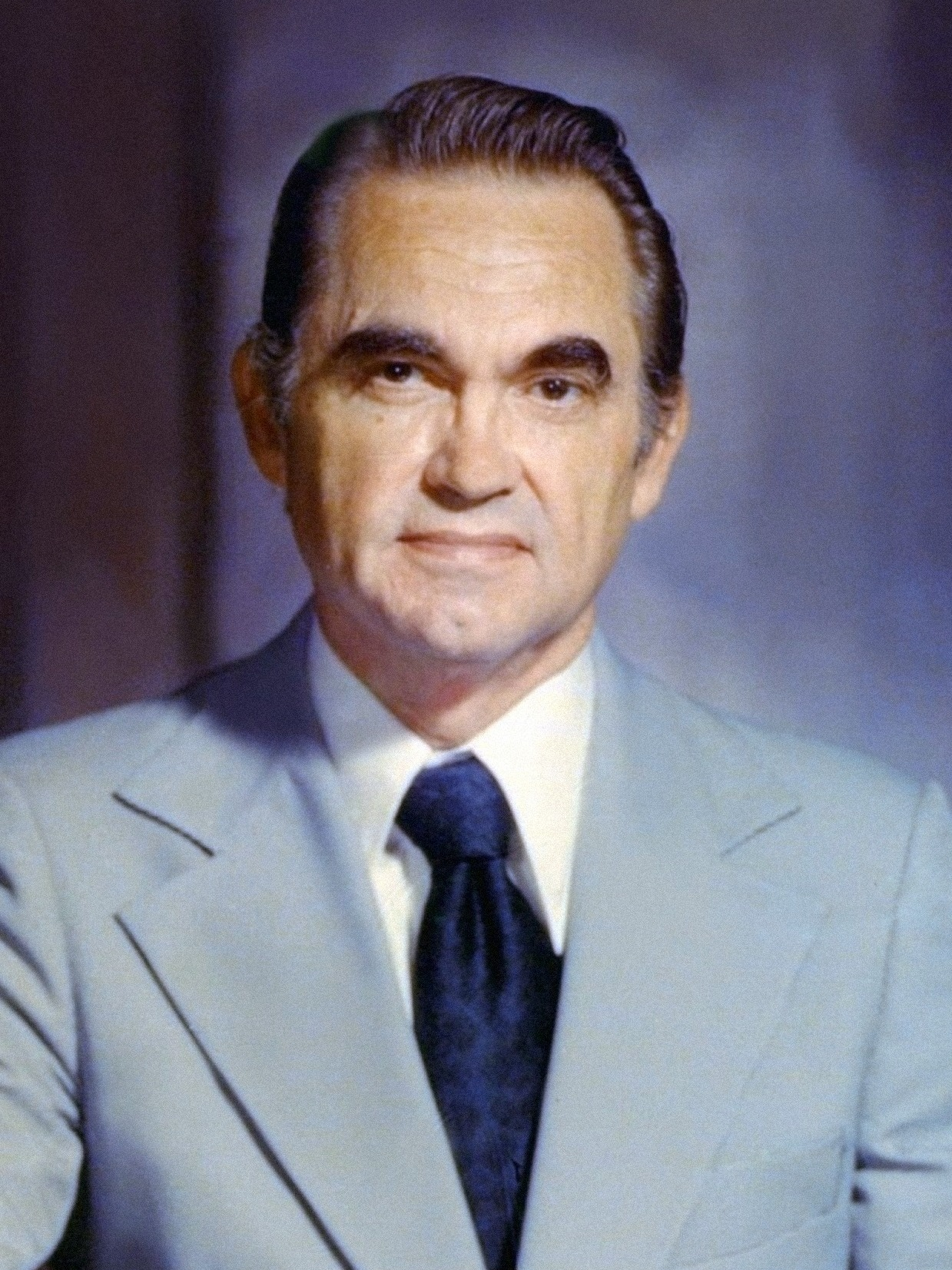

Candidate	George Wallace (not running for nomination)	Uncommitted (Note: Includes popular vote for all non-Wallace delegates.)
Home state	Alabama	—
Delegate count	31	18
First round	390,047; 56.68% 10 PD	310,435; 44.32% 2 PD
Runoff	134,614; 81.00% 3 PD	31,586; 19.00% 1 PD

Wallace
50–60%
60–70%
70–80%
80–90%
90–100%
Uncommitted
50–60%
60–70%
70–80%
No race

A presidential primary was held in the U.S. state of Alabama on May 7, 1968, with runoff elections in some congressional districts on June 4, to elect delegates representing Alabama to the 1968 Democratic National Convention. A substantial number of Alabama's national convention delegates were pledged to former Governor George Wallace as a favorite son candidate, despite his wishes. Wallace did not seek or want the national Democratic nomination, instead opting for a third-party run. (Note: Wallace sought and successfully won the state Democratic nomination via winning the Electoral College primary.) Despite the state having its congressional maps redrawn after losing a seat in the 1960 United States census, Alabama continued to use its nine old congressional districts from the 1950s for the purpose of electing delegates while simultaneously using the new eight districts for U.S. House of Representatives seats.

Of Alabama's fifty national delegate slots, only sixteen were up for election in May and June. Five of the thirty-four remaining delegates were party officers, or superdelegates, with twenty-nine running unopposed for their respective nominations. Alabama's forty-five pledged delegates were split equally among its nine old congressional districts and elected to designated places. On May 7, 1968, twelve delegates were elected in the first round, ten pledged to Wallace, and two uncommitted. The last four delegates were elected in the runoff; three for Wallace, and one uncommitted. On June 5, the day after the Democratic runoff, The Birmingham News determined that thirty-one delegates were pledged to George Wallace, eighteen were uncommitted, and one, Joe Reed of Montgomery, was pledged to Hubert Humphrey.

The state's fifty delegates were worth thirty-two votes, with most delegates only receiving a half vote. By the 1968 Democratic National Convention, delegates pledged to Wallace from Alabama numbered 9½ votes, and 20½ uncommitted. Many delegates who refused to sign the loyalty pledge to the national party were refused from being seated and were replaced. At the roll call, Alabama's votes numbered 23 for Hubert Humphrey, 3½ for Ted Kennedy, 1½ for Crimson Tide head coach Bear Bryant, half a vote each for Wallace and governor of North Carolina Dan K. Moore, with three abstentions.

== Results ==
An asterisk denotes a delegate elected, two asterisks denotes a delegate candidate advancing to a runoff.

=== Runoff results by old congressional district ===
Old CD and place	Pledged to George Wallace			Uncommitted			Total
Old CD and place	Candidate	Votes	%	Candidate	Votes	%	Total
1st, place 1	J. A. Kahalley*	27,722	56.22%	—	—	—	49,314
1st, place 1	Ellis V. Ollinger	21,592	43.78%	—	—	—	49,314
1st, place 2	Dan C. Alexander*	35,945	73.73%	—	—	—	48,751
1st, place 2	Frank O. Alonzo	12,806	26.27%	—	—	—	48,751
6th, place 5	J. R. Stallworth*	22,350	68.33%	F. N. Nixon	10,359	31.67%	32,709
8th, place 5	E. M. Frazier	14,199	40.08%	Jim O'Connor*	21,227	59.92%	35,426
Source: The Associated Press

=== First round results by old congressional district ===
Place	Pledged to George Wallace			Uncommitted			Total
Place	Candidate	Votes	%	Candidate	Votes	%	Total
1st, place 1	J. A. Kahalley**	23,059	45.30%	Roosevelt Johnson	7,922	15.56%	50,904
1st, place 1	Ellis V. Ollinger**	19,923	39.14%	—	—	—	50,904
1st, place 2	Dan C. Alexander**	25,280	49.65%	Annye H. Braxton	12,380	24.31%	50,920
1st, place 2	Frank O. Alonzo**	13,260	26.04%	—	—	—	50,920
2nd, place 1	Bob Coburn Jr.*	23,934	66.07%	Collins W. Harris	12,290	33.93%	36,224
3rd, place 1	Hilton Parish*	25,768	77.38%	Carl L. Raybon	7,531	22.62%	33,299
3rd, place 3	Frank P. Samples**	20,730	56.84%	Ezell Webb	8,303	22.76%	36,474
3rd, place 3	—	—	—	Henry O. Williams	7,441	20.40%	36,474
3rd, place 5	W. Ray Lolley*	26,253	73.20%	Aaron Sellers	9,613	26.80%	35,866
4th, place 2	Earl Goodwin*	25,857	74.08%	Frank Embry	9,048	25.92%	34,905
4th, place 4	—	—	—	Joe J. Phillips*	22,268	65.19%	34,157
4th, place 4	—	—	—	T. J. Clemons	11,889	34.81%	34,157
5th, place 5	Robert H. Wilder*	16,077	57.84%	Billy J. Gallaher	11,720	42.16%	27,797
6th, place 5	J. R. Stallworth**	15,551	45.86%	F. N. Nixon**	11,194	33.01%	33,909
6th, place 5	—	—	—	James W. Powell	7,164	21.13%	33,909
8th, place 2	Murray W. Beasley*	25,553	70.64%	George Castile	10,618	29.36%	36,171
8th, place 3	Mrs. E. M. Frazier*	18,830	54.75%	Wiley Layton	15,560	45.25%	34,390
8th, place 5	E. M. Frazier**	16,204	45.34%	Jim O'Connor**	13,335	37.31%	35,741
8th, place 5	—	—	—	Mariola Jernigan	6,202	17.35%	35,741
9th, place 1	—	—	—	Alan T. Drennon*	37,693	50.39%	74,800
9th, place 1	—	—	—	Jess Lanier	37,107	49.61%	74,800
9th, place 2	Robert C. Gafford*	46,647	64.37%	Reuben Davis	20,277	27.98%	72,471
9th, place 2	—	—	—	Henry Ulys Creel	5,547	7.65%	72,471
9th, place 4	Hubert Kilgore*	47,121	65.04%	James M. Tanner	25,333	34.96%	72,454
Source: Alabama Official and Statistical Register, 1971 (p. 396–410)

== See also ==
- 1968 Democratic Party presidential primaries
- 1968 United States presidential election
- 1968 United States presidential election in Alabama
- 1968 United States elections
