= 1968 Oregon State Senate election =

- November 5, 1968

17 of 30 seats in the Oregon State Senate (15 regular, 2 unexpired) 16 seats needed for a majority
	Majority party	Minority party
Leader	Debbs Potts	Athony Yturri
Party	Democratic	Republican
Leader's seat	6th district	16th district
Seats before	19	11
Seats won	9	8
Seats after	16	14
Popular vote	724,057	612,872
Percentage	54.14%	45.83%
- Results by party Democratic hold Republican gain Republican hold No election Asterisk: special election
Senate President before election
Debbs Potts
Democratic
Elected Senate President
Debbs Potts
Democratic

Elections to the Oregon State Senate were held on November 5, 1968, to elect 15 candidates to the Senate to serve four-year terms, and two to fill the two-year remainders of two unexpired terms. The Democratic Party won 9 seats to the Republicans' 8, resulting in a Senate composition of 16 Democrats and 14 Republicans, a net gain of three for the Republicans. Of the 16 Democrats, three of them were conservative Democrats, and 13 were liberal. The same coalition of conservative Democrats and Republicans that had held Senate leadership since 1961 held on, with Democrat Debbs Potts being re-elected Senate President on January 13, 1969, with 17 votes. Some within the liberal Democratic faction attempted to nominate Republican leader Anthony Yturri, who declined to seek the post due to his pledge to Potts.

This election used the same district boundaries used for the 1962–1966 general elections passed after the 1960 U.S. census. Since the passing of a 1965 law, senators in multi-member districts were elected to designated single-member positions beginning with the 1966 election, as opposed to plurality block voting which had been used previously. Incumbent senators in multi-member districts were assigned numbers based on their vote totals at their most recent general election, with the highest voted candidate getting position 1, second-highest position 2, and so on. Primary elections were held on May 28.

== Summary ==
Partisan makeup following the 1966 election
Republican
Democratic
Split delegation

Partisan makeup following the 1968 election
Republican
Democratic
Split delegation

== District 4 ==
Senate District 4 contained all of Douglas County and elected one senator.

District 4 Democratic primary election
Party	Candidate	Votes	%
Democratic	Al Flegel (incumbent)	9,898	100.00%
Total votes		9,898	100.00%

District 4 Republican primary election
Party	Candidate	Votes	%
Republican	William L. Lasswell	7,799	100.00%
Total votes		7,799	100.00%

District 4 election
Party	Candidate	Votes	%
Democratic	Al Flegel (incumbent)	12,969	50.75%
Republican	William L. Lasswell	12,585	49.25%
Total votes		25,554	100.00%

== District 6 ==
Senate District 6 contained all of Josephine County and elected one senator.

District 6 Democratic primary election
Party	Candidate	Votes	%
Democratic	Debbs Potts (incumbent)	5,025	100.00%
Total votes		5,025	100.00%

District 6 Republican primary election
Party	Candidate	Votes	%
Write-in	Debbs Potts (incumbent)	383	100.00%
Total votes		383	100.00%

District 6 election
Party	Candidate	Votes	%
Democratic	Debbs Potts (incumbent)	11,476	99.83%
Write-in		19	0.17%
Total votes		11,495	100.00%

== District 7 ==
Senate District 7 contained all of Coos and Curry counties and elected one senator.

District 7 Democratic primary election
Party	Candidate	Votes	%
Democratic	Dick Chapman (incumbent)	6,845	52.05%
Democratic	Marion Winslow	6,307	47.95%
Total votes		13,152	100.00%

District 7 Republican primary election
Party	Candidate	Votes	%
Republican	Sam Dement	7,069	100.00%
Total votes		7,069	100.00%

District 7 election
Party	Candidate	Votes	%
Republican	Sam Dement	15,500	61.32%
Democratic	Dick Chapman (incumbent)	9,776	38.68%
Total votes		25,276	100.00%
Republican gain from Democratic			

== District 9 ==
Senate District 9 contained all of Washington County and elected one senator.

District 9 Democratic primary election
Party	Candidate	Votes	%
Democratic	Gloria A. Lee	13,234	100.00%
Total votes		13,234	100.00%

District 9 Republican primary election
Party	Candidate	Votes	%
Republican	Victor Atiyeh (incumbent)	17,385	72.22%
Republican	Bud Kyle	6,686	27.78%
Total votes		24,071	100.00%

District 9 election
Party	Candidate	Votes	%
Republican	Victor Atiyeh (incumbent)	41,026	74.06%
Democratic	Gloria A. Lee	14,368	25.94%
Total votes		55,394	100.00%

== District 10 (2-year term) ==
A special election was held in District 14 to fill the remaining two years of Walter Leth's term after he was made director of the Oregon Department of Agriculture. Senate District 14 contained all of Clatsop and Columbia counties and elected one senator. Senate District 10 contained all of Benton and Polk counties and elected one senator.

District 10 Democratic primary election (2-year term)
Party	Candidate	Votes	%
Democratic	Larry Callahan	8,953	100.00%
Total votes		8,953	100.00%

District 10 Republican primary election (2-year term)
Party	Candidate	Votes	%
Republican	Dick Hoyt	12,389	100.00%
Total votes		12,389	100.00%

District 10 election (2-year term)
Party	Candidate	Votes	%
Republican	Dick Hoyt	18,645	63.59%
Democratic	Larry Callahan	10,676	36.41%
Total votes		29,321	100.00%
Republican hold			

== District 12 ==
Senate District 12 contained all of Multnomah County and elected eight senators, five during presidential election years and three during midterm election years.

=== Position 1 ===
District 12 position 1 Democratic primary election
Party	Candidate	Votes	%
Democratic	Don S. Willner (incumbent)	95,365	100.00%
Total votes		95,365	100.00%

District 12 position 1 Republican primary election
Party	Candidate	Votes	%
Republican	Jim Simmons	61,416	100.00%
Total votes		61,416	100.00%

District 12 position 1 election
Party	Candidate	Votes	%
Democratic	Don S. Willner (incumbent)	137,040	63.32%
Republican	Jim Simmons	79,359	36.67%
Write-in		12	0.01%
Total votes		216,411	100.00%

=== Position 2 ===
District 12 position 2 Democratic primary election
Party	Candidate	Votes	%
Democratic	Bud Lent (incumbent)	55,491	56.38%
Democratic	Jim Moore	42,939	43.62%
Total votes		98,430	100.00%

District 12 position 2 Republican primary election
Party	Candidate	Votes	%
Republican	G. Brooks Manchester	60,074	100.00%
Total votes		60,074	100.00%

District 12 position 2 election
Party	Candidate	Votes	%
Democratic	Bud Lent (incumbent)	125,784	60.47%
Republican	G. Brooks Manchester	82,215	39.52%
Write-in		14	0.01%
Total votes		208,013	100.00%

=== Position 3 ===
District 12 position 3 Democratic primary election
Party	Candidate	Votes	%
Democratic	Jack Bain (incumbent)	63,010	60.93%
Democratic	Frank Cleys	40,424	39.07%
Total votes		103,434	100.00%

District 12 position 3 Republican primary election
Party	Candidate	Votes	%
Republican	Marilyn Ridgley	59,387	100.00%
Total votes		59,387	100.00%

District 12 position 3 election
Party	Candidate	Votes	%
Democratic	Jack Bain (incumbent)	119,790	55.67%
Republican	Marilyn Ridgley	95,371	44.32%
Write-in		11	0.01%
Total votes		215,172	100.00%

=== Position 4 ===
Incumbent state representative Alice Corbett defeated incumbent senator Vern Cook in the balloting for the Democratic senate primary, however, she was struck off the ballot by the Oregon Supreme Court after her campaign was found to have violated the Corrupt Practices Act. Her campaign had used language such as "re-elect" and "senator" on campaign material which had implied she was an incumbent. The Court found that "the false statements were made as an integral part of a well-organized campaign," overturning a circuit court ruling which had dismissed the case after it found that the statements made were false, but not deliberate or material.

District 12 position 4 Democratic primary election
Party	Candidate	Votes	%
Democratic	Alice Corbett	58,236	52.80%
Democratic	Vern Cook (incumbent)	52,064	47.20%
Total votes		110,300	100.00%

District 12 position 4 Republican primary election
Party	Candidate	Votes	%
Republican	Hugh M. Swaney	58,921	100.00%
Total votes		58,921	100.00%

District 12 position 4 election
Party	Candidate	Votes	%
Democratic	Vern Cook (incumbent)	126,778	60.24%
Republican	Hugh M. Swaney	83,511	39.68%
Write-in		161	0.08%
Total votes		210,450	100.00%

=== Position 5 ===
District 12 position 5 Democratic primary election
Party	Candidate	Votes	%
Democratic	Betty Roberts	49,739	44.39%
Democratic	Tom Mahoney (incumbent)	48,454	43.24%
Democratic	Virginia Grant	13,860	12.37%
Total votes		112,053	100.00%

District 12 position 5 Republican primary election
Party	Candidate	Votes	%
Republican	Bob Chappel	62,326	100.00%
Total votes		62,326	100.00%

District 12 position 5 election
Party	Candidate	Votes	%
Democratic	Betty Roberts	120,804	56.13%
Republican	Bob Chappel	94,409	43.86%
Write-in		14	0.01%
Total votes		215,227	100.00%
Democratic hold			

== District 13 ==
Senate District 13 contained all of Lincoln and Tillamook counties and elected one senator.

District 13 Democratic primary election
Party	Candidate	Votes	%
Democratic	Albert Strand	4,941	61.19%
Democratic	Edward F. Ridderbusch	3,134	38.81%
Total votes		8,075	100.00%

District 13 Republican primary election
Party	Candidate	Votes	%
Republican	W. Stan Ouderkirk	2,716	41.97%
Republican	Donn D. DeBernardi	2,476	38.27%
Republican	Carlisle F. Stranahan	1,279	19.77%
Total votes		6,471	100.00%

District 13 election
Party	Candidate	Votes	%
Republican	W. Stan Ouderkirk	9,075	51.57%
Democratic	Albert Strand	8,521	48.43%
Total votes		17,596	100.00%
Republican gain from Democratic			

== District 14 (2-year term) ==
A special election was held in District 14 to fill the remaining two years of Dan A. Thiel's term after he was made postmaster of Astoria. State representative Bill Holmstrom, who had already been renominated to the state house, was elected to fill the seat. Senate District 14 contained all of Clatsop and Columbia counties and elected one senator.

District 14 election (2-year term)
Party	Candidate	Votes	%
Democratic	Bill Holmstrom	11,962	51.76%
Republican	Ben Coleman	11,149	48.24%
Write-in		1	0.00%
Total votes		23,112	100.00%
Democratic hold			

== District 15 ==
Senate District 15 contained all of Klamath County and elected one senator.

District 15 Democratic primary election
Party	Candidate	Votes	%
Democratic	Harry D. Boivin (incumbent)	4,900	72.09%
Democratic	Gerald W. Sayles	1,897	27.91%
Total votes		6,797	100.00%

District 15 Republican primary election
Party	Candidate	Votes	%
Write-in	Harry D. Boivin (incumbent)	314	100.00%
Total votes		314	100.00%

District 15 election
Party	Candidate	Votes	%
Democratic	Harry D. Boivin (incumbent)	14,113	99.88%
Write-in		17	0.12%
Total votes		14,130	100.00%

== District 16 ==
Senate District 16 contained all of Baker, Grant, Harney, and Malheur counties and elected one senator.

District 16 Democratic primary election
Party	Candidate	Votes	%
Write-in	Anthony Yturri (incumbent)	212	100.00%
Total votes		212	100.00%

District 16 Republican primary election
Party	Candidate	Votes	%
Republican	Anthony Yturri (incumbent)	7,188	100.00%
Total votes		7,188	100.00%

District 16 election
Party	Candidate	Votes	%
Republican	Anthony Yturri (incumbent)	16,945	99.88%
Write-in		20	0.12%
Total votes		16,965	100.00%

== District 17 ==
Senate District 17 contained all of Umatilla, Union, and Wallowa counties and elected one senator.

District 17 Democratic primary election
Party	Candidate	Votes	%
Write-in	Ruff Raymond (incumbent)	112	100.00%
Total votes		112	100.00%

District 17 Republican primary election
Party	Candidate	Votes	%
Republican	Ruff Raymond (incumbent)	8,432	100.00%
Total votes		8,432	100.00%

District 17 election
Party	Candidate	Votes	%
Republican	Ruff Raymond (incumbent)	21,650	99.88%
Write-in		27	0.12%
Total votes		21,677	100.00%

== District 18 ==
Senate District 18 contained all of Gilliam, Hood River, Morrow, Sherman, Wasco, and Wheeler counties and elected one senator.

District 18 Democratic primary election
Party	Candidate	Votes	%
Write-in	Kenneth A. Jernstedt	1,025	100.00%
Total votes		1,025	100.00%

District 18 Republican primary election
Party	Candidate	Votes	%
Republican	Kenneth A. Jernstedt	6,148	100.00%
Total votes		6,148	100.00%

District 18 election
Party	Candidate	Votes	%
Republican	Kenneth A. Jernstedt	15,275	99.80%
Write-in		17	0.11%
Total votes		15,292	100.00%
Republican gain from Democratic			

== District 19 ==
Senate District 19 contained all of Crook, Deschutes, Jefferson, and Lake counties and elected one senator.

District 19 Democratic primary election
Party	Candidate	Votes	%
Write-in	Gordon McKay (incumbent)	520	100.00%
Total votes		520	100.00%

District 19 Republican primary election
Party	Candidate	Votes	%
Republican	Gordon McKay (incumbent)	6,647	100.00%
Total votes		6,647	100.00%

District 19 election
Party	Candidate	Votes	%
Republican	Gordon McKay (incumbent)	16,157	99.87%
Write-in		21	0.13%
Total votes		16,178	100.00%

== See also ==
- 1968 United States presidential election in Oregon
- List of Oregon Legislative Assemblies
