= Robert Pickrell =

American politician (1922–2017)

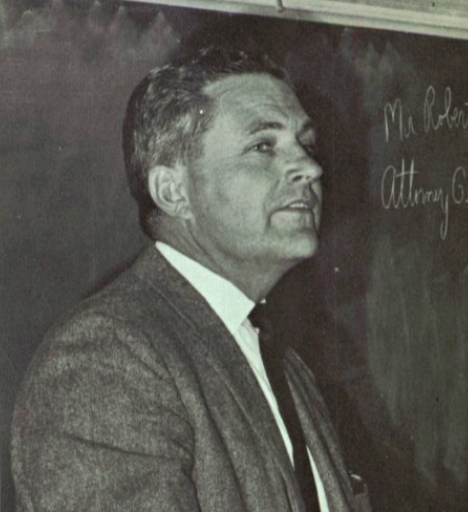

15th Attorney General of Arizona
- In office January 2, 1961 – January 4, 1965
- Governor: Paul Fannin
- Preceded by: Wade Church
- Succeeded by: Darrell F. Smith

Personal details
- Born: November 25, 1922; Prescott, Arizona, U.S.
- Died: August 10, 2017 (aged 94); Phoenix, Arizona, U.S.
- Political party: Republican

Robert W. Pickrell (November 25, 1922 – August 10, 2017) was an American lawyer and politician who served as the Attorney General of Arizona from 1961 to 1965.

== Education and career ==
Pickrell attended Phoenix Union High School for one year before his family moved to Tucson. He graduated from Tucson Senior High School in 1940. After three years at the University of Arizona, Pickrell joined the Army. He served as a rifleman and flame thrower during World War II during the campaigns in Italy and Southern France. Returning to the University of Arizona, Pickrell received a bachelor of arts degree and obtained his law degree two years later. After graduating, he first practiced law in Willcox two years with the Bisbee firm of Gentry & Gentry. He also served for one year on the Willcox High School Board of Education.

In 1951, Pickrell became an attorney for the Arizona Industrial Commission and two years later became an Assistant Attorney General representing the State Land Department and the Arizona Corporation Commission. From 1955 to 1960, he was engaged in private practice with his own law firm, Pickrell, Hunter, Hunter, Bartlett and Penn."

Pickrell was elected attorney general in 1960 defeating incumbent Wade Church and was re-elected in 1962 in a rematch against Church.

In 1966, Pickrell ran for governor but lost in the republican primary to Jack Williams.

=== Death ===
He died on August 10, 2017, in Phoenix, Arizona at age 94.
