= 1964 Arizona gubernatorial election =

- November 3, 1964
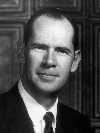

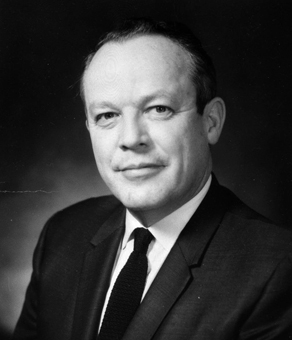
Nominee	Samuel Goddard	Richard Kleindienst
Party	Democratic	Republican
Popular vote	252,098	221,404
Percentage	53.24%	46.76%
- County results Goddard: 50–60% 60–70% 70–80% Kleindienst: 50–60%
Governor before election
Paul J. Fannin
Republican
Elected Governor
Samuel P. Goddard
Democratic

The 1964 Arizona gubernatorial election took place on November 3, 1964. Incumbent Governor Paul Fannin decided not to run for reelection to a fourth term as governor, instead deciding to successfully run for the United States Senate when incumbent U.S. Senator Barry Goldwater decided to run for President of the United States.

Despite Goldwater being at the top of the ticket as the Republican nominee for president against Lyndon Johnson, Samuel Pearson Goddard, who lost to Fannin in 1962, won the Democratic nomination and subsequently the general election, defeating Arizona Republican Party Chairman Richard Kleindienst (who would later serve as US Attorney General in the administration of Richard Nixon). Goddard was sworn into his first and only term as governor on January 4, 1965.

== Republican primary ==
The Republican primary took place on September 8, 1964. Incumbent Governor Paul Fannin decided not to run for a fourth consecutive term, instead opting to run for the United States Senate seat being vacated by U.S. Senator Barry Goldwater, who had instead decided to run for President of the United States. Arizona Republican Party Chairman Richard Kleindienst, as well as state senator and 1962 Republican U.S. Senate nominee Evan Mecham sought the Republican nomination to succeed Paul Fannin, with Kleindienst winning by a wide margin.

=== Candidates ===
- Richard Kleindienst, Arizona Republican Party Chairman, former state representative
- Evan Mecham, former state senator, U.S. Senate nominee in 1962

=== Results ===
Republican primary results
Party	Candidate	Votes	%
Republican	Richard Kleindienst	64,310	62.78%
Republican	Evan Mecham	38,131	37.22%
Total votes		102,441	100.00%

== Democratic primary ==
=== Candidates ===
- Art Brock
- David C. Cox
- Samuel P. Goddard, 1962 Democratic nominee for governor
- J. Michael Morris

=== Results ===
Democratic primary results
Party	Candidate	Votes	%
Democratic	Sam Goddard	114,377	60.04%
Democratic	Art Brock	57,067	29.96%
Democratic	J. Michael Morris	11,303	5.93%
Democratic	David C. Cox	7,749	4.07%
Total votes		190,496	100.00%

== General election ==
=== Results ===
Arizona gubernatorial election, 1964
Party	Candidate	Votes	%	±%
Democratic	Sam Goddard	252,098	53.24%	+8.07%
Republican	Richard Kleindienst	221,404	46.76%	−8.07%
Majority		30,694	6.48%	
Total votes		473,502	100.00%	
Democratic gain from Republican		Swing	+16.14%	

=== Results by county ===
County	Sam Goddard Democratic		Richard Kleindienst Republican		Margin		Total votes cast
County	#	%	#	%	#	%	Total votes cast
Apache	2,251	59.42%	1,537	40.58%	714	18.85%	3,788
Cochise	10,036	60.84%	6,461	39.16%	3,575	21.67%	16,497
Coconino	5,551	51.47%	5,234	48.53%	317	2.94%	10,785
Gila	7,154	68.52%	3,287	31.48%	3,867	37.04%	10,441
Graham	2,989	55.75%	2,372	44.25%	617	11.51%	5,361
Greenlee	3,288	76.91%	987	23.09%	2,301	53.82%	4,275
Maricopa	127,830	49.07%	132,677	50.93%	-4,847	-1.86%	260,507
Mohave	2,270	54.79%	1,873	45.21%	397	9.58%	4,143
Navajo	4,943	52.06%	4,551	47.94%	392	4.13%	9,494
Pima	58,639	58.38%	41,807	41.62%	16,832	16.76%	100,466
Pinal	10,513	62.85%	6,214	37.15%	4,299	25.70%	16,727
Santa Cruz	2,117	62.06%	1,294	37.94%	823	24.13%	3,411
Yavapai	5,930	44.73%	7,328	55.27%	-1,398	-10.54%	13,258
Yuma	8,587	59.76%	5,782	40.24%	2,805	19.52%	14,369
Totals	252,098	53.24%	221,404	46.76%	30,694	6.48%	473,502

==== Counties that flipped from Republican to Democratic ====
- Apache
- Coconino
- Graham
- Mohave
- Navajo
- Yuma
