= Aldea Linda Residential Historic District =

Historic district in Tucson, Arizona

- U.S. National Register of Historic Places
- U.S. Historic district
- Location: 4700-5000 blocks of E. Calle Jabali, E. 22nd St., 1100 block of S. Swan Rd., Tucson, Arizona
- Coordinates: 32.209018°N 110.887570°W
- Area: 75 acres (30 ha)
- Built: 1947
- Architectural style: Mission/spanish Revival, Modern Movement, ranch and neo-eclectic
- NRHP reference No.: 09000371
- Added to NRHP: June 5, 2009

The Aldea Linda Residential Historic District is a 75 acres (30 ha) historic district in Tucson, Arizona, which was listed on the National Register of Historic Places in 2009. The listing included 15 contributing buildings.

The area was developed around 1947 by future state governor Sam Goddard. It has 22 large lots with houses set back from street.

It includes the entire Aldea Linda subdivision, including the 4700-5000 blocks of E. Calle Jabali, E. 22nd St., and the 1100 block of S. Swan Rd. Its 2009 National Register nomination describes it as:

an absolutely unique and precious enclave .... The neighborhood combines high quality, post-World War II residences, one art school, a church complex, and vacant land in a natural, creosote desert setting. In the midst of dense urban development, Aldea Linda's uniqueness comes from its small size, intact deed restrictions, curvilinear cul-de-sac layout, large lots, creosote desert setting, and post- World War II architecture. Its period of significance is 1947-1964. Aldea Linda's land was acquired in 1946 by Samuel P. Goddard, Jr. (future governor of Arizona) and his wife, Julia Hatch Goddard. Today's subdivision contains very good examples of prevalent post-World War II contemporary styles, the Ranch and Modern, and a few, regionally appropriate, Sonoran Revival and Spanish Colonial Revival style buildings.
