= Wade Church =

American politician (1908–2002)

14th Attorney General of Arizona
- In office January 1, 1959 – January 2, 1961
- Governor: Paul Fannin
- Preceded by: Robert Morrison
- Succeeded by: Robert Pickrell

Personal details
- Born: May 4, 1908; Helena, Montana
- Died: December 4, 2002 (aged 94); Phoenix, Arizona
- Political party: Democratic

Wade Church (May 4, 1908 – December 4, 2002) was an American politician who served as the Attorney General of Arizona from 1959 to 1961. Church is the most recent incumbent attorney general to lose a general election in Arizona.

Church graduated Valedictorian from UCLA in 1933 and from Harvard Law School in 1938. In 1941 he became an assistant city attorney for the City of Phoenix. He was elected Arizona Attorney General in 1958. He was defeated the following year by republican Robert Pickrell.

== AFL-CIO speech ==
On May 7, 1959, Mr. Church delivered a speech in Flagstaff, Arizona to the delegates of an AFL-CIO convention. Four days later, an editorial, prominently placed on the front page, rather than on the editorial pages, appeared in the Arizona Republic in 84-point font. The editorial accused Church of being a communist. Church sued the newspaper, won, and in 1968 the jury's award was upheld by the Arizona Supreme Court. In 1976, Church finally received almost $650,000 in libel damages.
