= 1968 United States ballot measures =

- 1968

Part of the 1968 United States elections

This page lists state ballot measures in the United States in 1968 in the United States by state. Measures are included whether they are initiated by a state legislature or by the citizens of said state. Subheadings are included under a state if there was a measure that was held on a different date with the subheading being the date of the ballot measures. Results for each measure are included the "Results" heading and not under headings for each state with only whether they passed or not being included.

These measures were held during a time when traction was being gained to reduce the voting age due to the ongoing Vietnam War and for more civil rights during the conccurent civil rights movement such as a veto referendum which if passed would have banned housing discrimination in Maryland (this measure did not pass) and a measure in Washington which passed that allowed for revocation or suspension of one's real estate license if one discriminated based on a person's race or origin. One example of a referendum to lower the voting age was in Hawaii where it proposed to lower it from 20 to 18 but this measure failed.

Wyoming established a process for citizens to initiate amendments, laws or have a veto with Amendment 2.

== Results ==
| State | Origin | Measure | Yes | No |
|---|---|---|---|---|
| Alaska | Citizens (veto referendum) | Voter Registration Veto Referendum | 51.29% 37,152 | 48.71% 35,278 |
| Georgia | Legislature | Amendment 1 | 86.50% 686,680 | 13.50% 107,195 |
| Georgia | Legislature | Amendment 2 | 88.51% 683,345 | 11.49% 90,625 |
| Florida | Legislature | Amendment 1 | 55.42% 645,233 | 44.58% 518,940 |
| Hawaii | State constitutional convention | Amendment 8 | 49.24% 96,283 | 50.76% 99,257 |
| Hawaii | State constitutional convention | Amendment 11 | 75.30% 147,254 | 24.70% 48,295 |
| Maryland | Citizens (veto referendum) | Question 4 | 44.54% 275,781 | 55.46% 343,447 |
| Nebraska | Legislature | Amendment 1 | 49.16% 246,672 | 50.84% 255,051 |
| Washington | Citizens (Veto referendum) | Referendum 35 | 53.57% 580,578 | 46.43% 503,226 |
| Wyoming | Legislature | Amendment 1 | 69.47% 73,872 | 30.53% 32,457 |
| Wyoming | Legislature | Amendment 2 | 72,009 74.77% | 24,299 25.23% |

== Alaska ==
- Voter Registration Veto Referendum, a veto referendum that proposed vetoing automatic voter registration in Alaska. This measure failed.

== Georgia ==
- Amendment 1, a legislatively-referred constitutional amendment which if passed would have the lieutenant governor succeed the state governor if the governor were to die.
- Amendment 2, a legislatively-referred constitutional amendment if passed would hold a runoff election if in a general election no candidate received a majority of votes cast. This amendment passed.

== Florida ==
- Amendment 1, a legislatively-referred constitutional amendment that asked voters whether to approve a new constitution or not. The measure passed.

== Hawaii ==
- Amendment 8, would have lowered the voting age from 20 years old to 18 years old. This measure failed.
- Amendment 11, would authorize the legislature to "provide for a presidential preference primary". This measure passed.

== Maryland ==
- Question 4, a veto referendum about whether to ban housing discrimination based on one's race, origin, religion "or ancestry" in housing. This would cover the sale, lease, rental and financing of housing in Maryland. If passed it would have allowed for such discrimination. This measure failed.

== Nebraska ==
- Amendment 1, a legislatively referred amendment which if passed would have lowered the voting age to 19 years old. This failed.

== Washington ==
- Referendum 35, a veto referendum which if passed would result in the suspension or revocation of a person's real estate license if one discriminated based on a person's "race, creed, color, or national origin".

== Wyoming ==
- Amendment 1, a legislatively referred amendment that if passed would repeal poll taxes. This measure passed.
- Amendment 2, establish an initiative process for referendums that citizens could use for amendments to the state constitution, laws or vetos. This measure passed.
