= Richard Kleindienst =

United States Attorney General

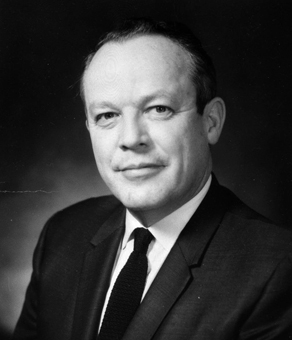

68th United States Attorney General
- In office June 12, 1972 – April 30, 1973
- President: Richard Nixon
- Deputy: Ralph E. Erickson; Joseph Tyree Sneed III
- Preceded by: John Mitchell
- Succeeded by: Elliot Richardson

10th United States Deputy Attorney General
- In office January 20, 1969 – June 12, 1972
- President: Richard Nixon
- Preceded by: Warren Christopher
- Succeeded by: Ralph E. Erickson

Arizona House of Representatives
- In office 1953–1954

Personal details
- Born: Richard Gordon Kleindienst; August 5, 1923 Winslow, Arizona, U.S.
- Died: February 3, 2000 (aged 76) Prescott, Arizona, U.S.
- Party: Republican
- Spouse: Margaret Dunbar
- Children: Wallace Kleindienst
- Education: Harvard University (BA, LLB)
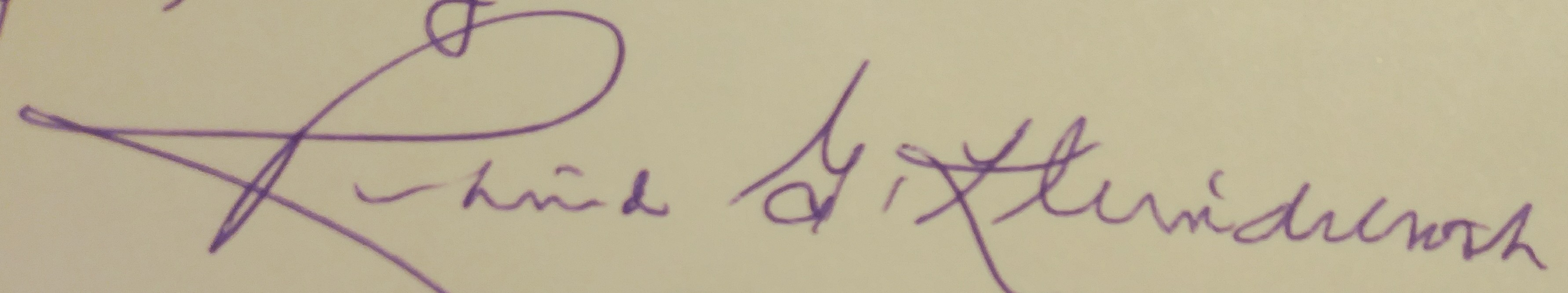
- Signature

Military service
- Allegiance: United States
- Branch/service: United States Army
- Years of service: 1943–1946
- Unit: United States Army Air Forces

Richard Gordon Kleindienst (August 5, 1923 – February 3, 2000) was an American lawyer, politician, and U.S. Attorney General during the early stages of Watergate political scandal. He resigned his post in disgrace for his involvement in the Watergate cover-up.

== Early life and career ==
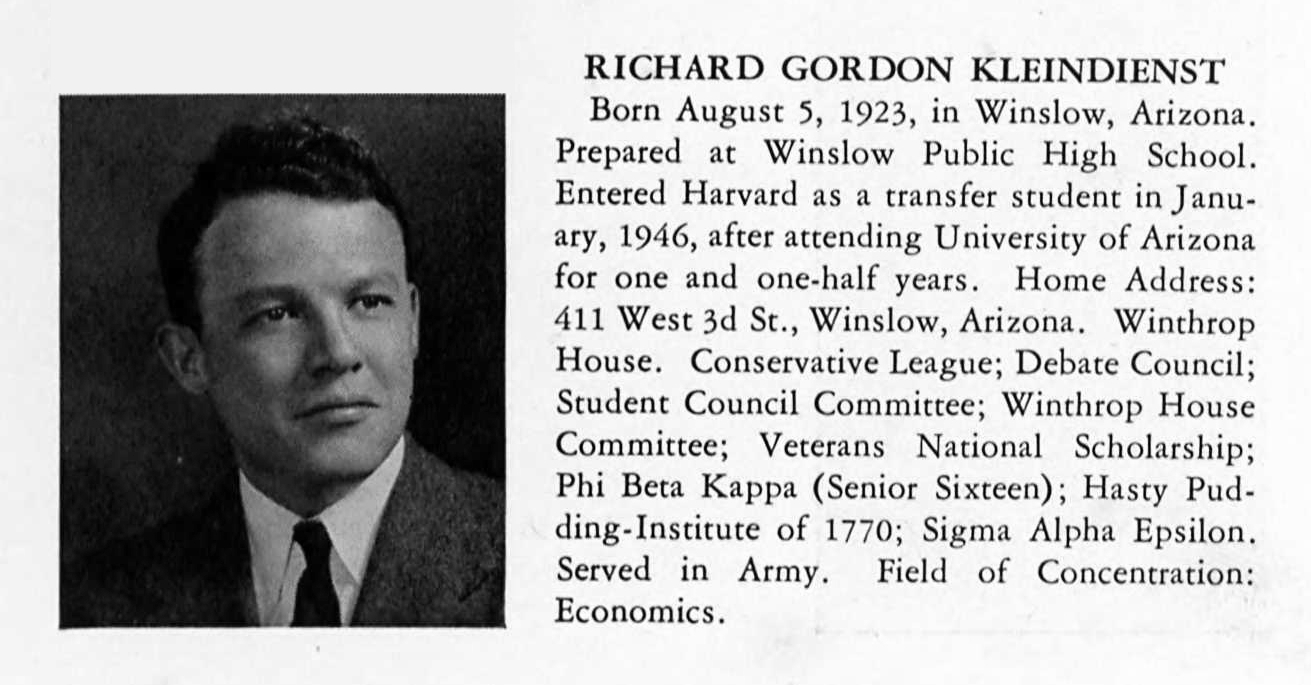
Kleindienst in the Harvard University yearbook, 1947

Kleindienst was born August 5, 1923, in Winslow, Arizona, the son of Gladys (Love) and Alfred R. Kleindienst. He attended the University of Arizona before serving in the United States Army Air Forces from 1943 to 1946. Following his military service, he attended Harvard College and Harvard Law School, graduating from the latter in 1950.

From 1953 to 1954, he served in the Arizona House of Representatives; he followed that with some 15 years of private legal practice. He concurrently was Arizona Republican Party chairman from 1956 to 1960 and 1961 to 1963, and in the 1964 Arizona gubernatorial election, the Republican candidate for Governor of Arizona, losing the general election to Sam Goddard, 53–47%.

== Role in Goldwater campaign ==
On January 3, 1964, Barry Goldwater asked his friend Kleindienst to serve as Director of Operations in his presidential campaign. Goldwater stipulated that he would only respond to the "draft Goldwater" movement if the campaign were led by three Republicans close to him: Kleindienst, Denison Kitchel as Campaign Manager, and Dean Burch as Assistant Campaign Manager.

Kleindienst had never worked on a national campaign. Political experts told Goldwater that F. Clifton White, an experienced GOP operative, would be a better choice. Goldwater rejected this change, but did agree to Kleindienst and White sharing the role.

== Nixon administration ==
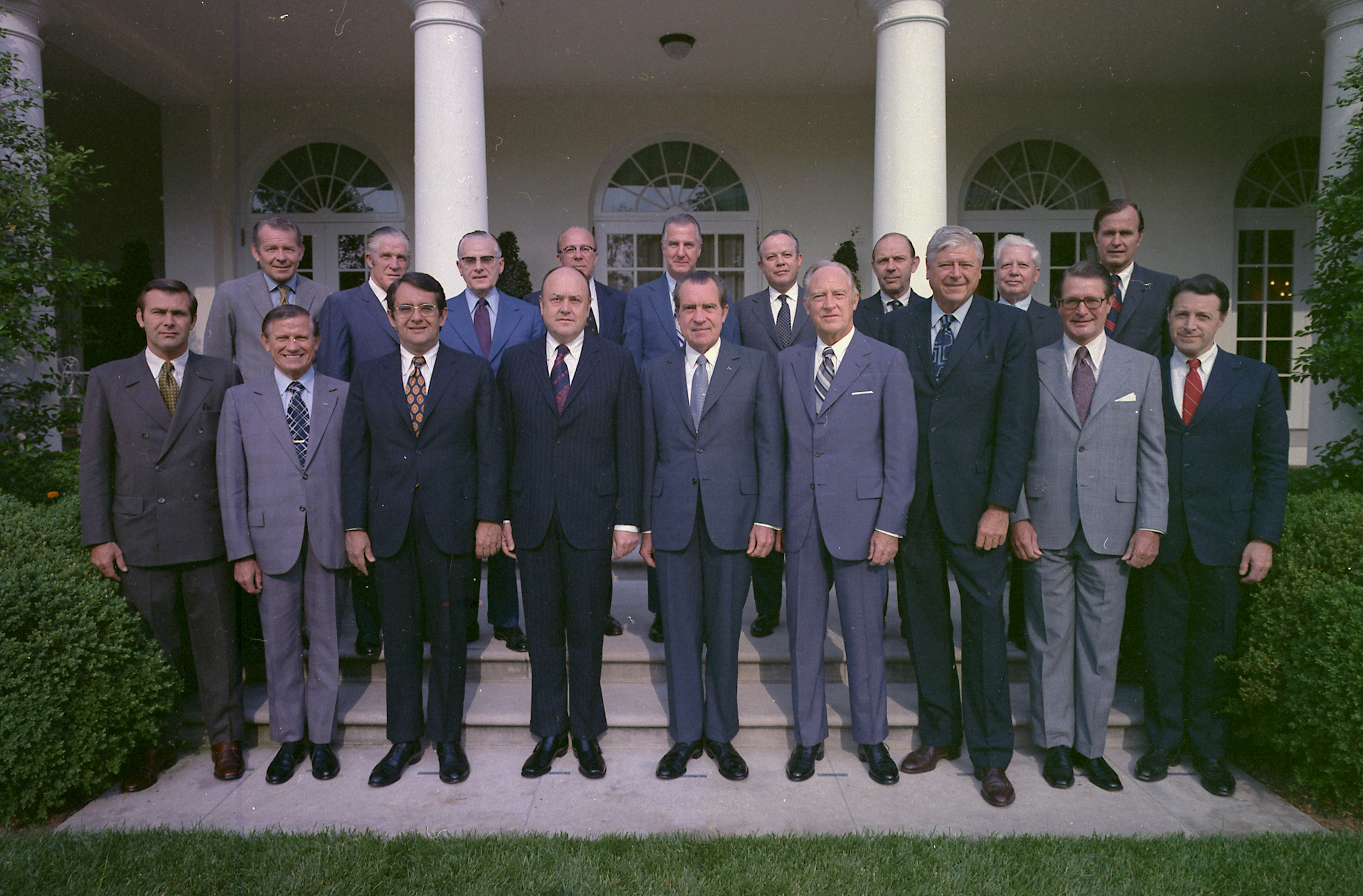
Kleindienst in a group photo of Nixon's cabinet on June 16, 1972, fourth from the right in the back row.

After Richard Nixon won the 1968 presidential election, John N. Mitchell agreed to serve as United States Attorney General on the condition that Kleindienst serve as Deputy Attorney General. Kleindienst suspended his private practice in 1969 to accept the post of Deputy Attorney General offered him by President Nixon. This gave him responsibilities relating to the government's suit against the International Telephone & Telegraph Corporation (ITT). Nixon and his aide John Ehrlichman told him to drop the case, which created an impression that they were violating their ethical obligations (as attorneys) in favor of ITT, and that, as an attorney himself, Kleindienst was also now obligated to report these ethical lapses to the state bars in the jurisdictions involved. But in his official role as Deputy Attorney General, he also repeatedly told Congress that no one had interfered with his department's handling of the case, failing to mention either Nixon or Ehrlichman.

On February 15, 1972, Attorney General Mitchell resigned effective March 1 in order to work on the Nixon re-election campaign, with President Nixon nominating Kleindienst to serve as his successor. After having served as Acting Attorney General for a little under three and a half months, his appointment was approved by the Senate on June 12 after an attempt to block the nomination by Ted Kennedy on the grounds of his involvement with ITT failed.

Unknown to Kleindienst, leaders of the Committee to Re-Elect the President (CRP) had tasked Gordon Liddy with arranging various covert operations, one of which was to be a burglary of the Democratic National Committee headquarters at the Watergate complex in Washington, DC. Before dawn on Saturday, June 17, 1972, five days after Kleindienst was sworn in, James McCord and four other burglars operating on Liddy's instructions were arrested at the Watergate complex. Later in the morning Kleindienst was officially notified of the arrests. Liddy, after a phone consultation about the arrests with CRP Deputy Director Jeb Magruder (who had managed CRP up until March of that year, and had the most direct organizational authority over Liddy's activities), personally approached Kleindienst the same day at the Burning Tree Club golf club in Bethesda, Maryland. Liddy told him that the break-in had originated within CRP, and that Mitchell wanted Kleindienst to arrange the release of the burglars to reduce the risk of exposure of CRP's involvement. But Kleindienst refused and ordered that the Watergate burglary investigation proceed like any other case.

Kleindienst, at the time the top law enforcement officer of the United States, omitted to share with FBI investigators or his department's prosecutor the information about Liddy's confession of his own involvement or about Liddy's claim that Mitchell was seeking to obstruct justice.

Kleindienst ultimately resigned in the midst of the Watergate scandal nearly a year later, on April 30, 1973. This was the same day that John Dean was fired and H. R. Haldeman and John Ehrlichman resigned. In 1974, he pleaded guilty to contempt of Congress for his lying to the Senate during his confirmation hearings about ending an antitrust investigation of ITT after the company made a $400,000 contribution to the Republican National Convention. Kleindienst was one of few people in modern U.S. history to be convicted of contempt of Congress; G. Gordon Liddy, another figure in the Watergate scandal, also was convicted in the 1970s.

In April 1982, the Arizona Supreme Court unanimously suspended Kleindienst from the practice of law for 1 year due to his unethical conduct, accepting a disciplinary recommendation from the state bar association. The suspension was due to statements he made to a bar investigator probing Kleindienst's representation in a 1976 insurance company fraud case. In October 1982, the U.S. Supreme Court, on a unanimous vote, disbarred Kleindienst, blocking him from practicing before the highest court.

== Later life ==
In 1981, Kleindienst was charged with perjury regarding how much he knew about a white-collar criminal he represented; he was subsequently acquitted.

He died at the age of 76, of lung cancer, on February 3, 2000.

In the 2023 HBO Max miniseries White House Plumbers, Kleindienst is portrayed by Corbin Bernsen.

== Bibliography ==
- Kleindienst, Richard (1985). Justice: The Memoirs of Attorney General Richard Kleindienst. Ottawa, Illinois: Jameson Books. ISBN 0-915463-15-6.
- For Kleindienst's role in Watergate, see Leon Jaworski, The Right and the Power, and Bob Woodward and Carl Bernstein, All the President's Men.

Party political offices
Preceded by Paul Fannin	Republican nominee for Governor of Arizona; 1964	Succeeded by Jack Williams
Legal offices
Preceded by Warren Christopher	United States Deputy Attorney General; 1969–1972	Succeeded by Ralph Erickson
Preceded by John Mitchell	United States Attorney General; 1972–1973	Succeeded by Elliot Richardson
