= 1966 Arizona gubernatorial election =

- November 8, 1966
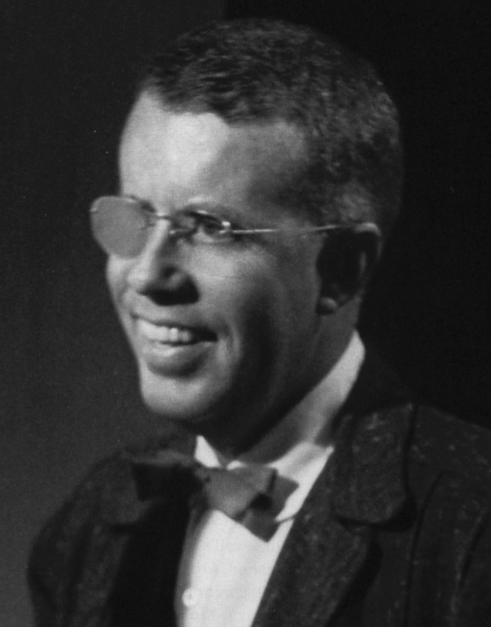

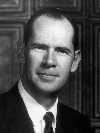
Nominee	Jack Williams	Samuel Goddard
Party	Republican	Democratic
Popular vote	203,438	174,904
Percentage	53.77%	46.23%
- County results Williams: 50–60% 60–70% Goddard: 50–60% 60–70% 70–80%
Governor before election
Samuel Goddard
Democratic
Elected Governor
Jack Williams
Republican

The 1966 Arizona gubernatorial election took place on November 8, 1966. Incumbent governor Samuel Pearson Goddard ran for reelection to a second term as governor, narrowly winning the Democratic Party nomination as he was challenged by Justice of the Peace Norman Green.

Goddard went on to lose the general election to former mayor of Phoenix Jack Williams. This is the last time that an incumbent governor of Arizona lost reelection.

== Democratic primary ==
=== Candidates ===
- Samuel P. Goddard, incumbent governor
- Norman Green, Justice of the Peace
- Andrew J. Gilbert

=== Results ===
Democratic primary results
Party	Candidate	Votes	%
Democratic	Sam Goddard (incumbent)	63,180	44.89%
Democratic	Norman Green	53,921	38.31%
Democratic	Andrew J. Gilbert	23,637	16.80%
Total votes		140,738	100.00%

== Republican primary ==
=== Candidates ===
- Jack Williams, former mayor of Phoenix
- John Haugh, Speaker of the Arizona House of Representatives
- Robert W. Pickrell Attorney General of Arizona

Williams: 30–40% 40–50% 50–60% 60–70% Haugh: 40–50% 50–60% Pickrell: 30–40% 50–60%

=== Results ===
Republican primary results
Party	Candidate	Votes	%
Republican	Jack Williams	37,409	44.27%
Republican	John Haugh	25,905	30.66%
Republican	Robert W. Pickrell	21,192	25.08%
Total votes		84,506	100.00%

== General election ==
=== Results ===
Arizona gubernatorial election, 1966
Party	Candidate	Votes	%	±%
Republican	Jack Williams	203,438	53.77%	+7.01%
Democratic	Sam Goddard (incumbent)	174,904	46.23%	−7.01%
Majority		28,534	7.54%	
Total votes		378,342	100.00%	
Republican gain from Democratic		Swing	+14.02%	

=== Results by county ===
County	Jack Williams Republican		Sam Goddard Democratic		Margin		Total votes cast
County	#	%	#	%	#	%	Total votes cast
Apache	1,458	45.55%	1,743	54.45%	-285	-8.90%	3,201
Cochise	5,820	45.07%	7,094	54.93%	-1,274	-9.87%	12,914
Coconino	4,465	56.75%	3,403	43.25%	1,062	13.50%	7,868
Gila	3,532	41.26%	5,028	58.74%	-1,496	-17.48%	8,560
Graham	1,955	47.19%	2,188	52.81%	-233	-5.62%	4,143
Greenlee	1,020	29.63%	2,423	70.37%	-1,403	-40.75%	3,443
Maricopa	124,183	58.68%	87,449	41.32%	36,734	17.36%	211,632
Mohave	1,881	52.47%	1,704	47.53%	177	4.94%	3,585
Navajo	3,841	54.57%	3,198	45.43%	643	9.13%	7,039
Pima	35,901	46.29%	41,657	53.71%	-5,756	-7.42%	77,558
Pinal	6,087	45.50%	7,292	54.50%	-1,205	-9.01%	13,379
Santa Cruz	1,088	38.75%	1,720	61.25%	-632	-22.51%	2,808
Yavapai	7,116	61.88%	4,384	38.12%	2,732	23.76%	11,500
Yuma	5,091	47.53%	5,621	52.47%	-530	-4.95%	10,712
Totals	203,438	53.77%	174,904	46.23%	28,534	7.54%	378,342

==== Counties that flipped from Democratic to Republican ====
- Coconino
- Mohave
- Navajo
