= 1968 Arizona gubernatorial election =

- November 5, 1968
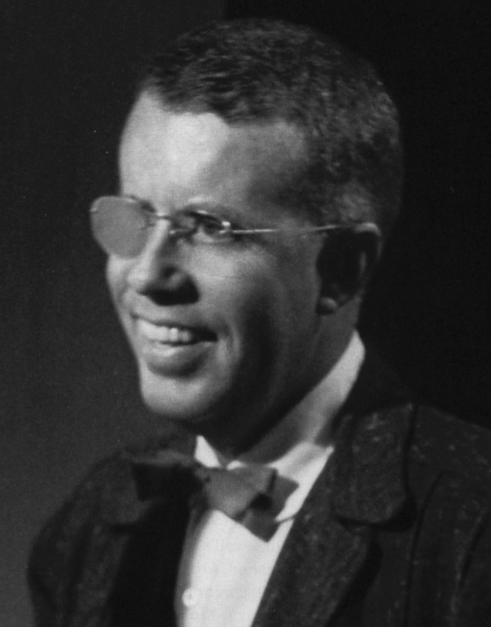

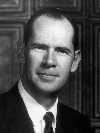
Nominee	Jack Williams	Samuel Goddard
Party	Republican	Democratic
Popular vote	279,923	204,075
Percentage	57.84%	42.16%
- County results Williams: 50–60% 60–70% Goddard: 50–60% 60–70% 70–80%
Governor before election
Jack Williams
Republican
Elected Governor
Jack Williams
Republican

The 1968 Arizona gubernatorial election took place on November 5, 1968. Incumbent Governor Jack Williams ran for reelection to a second term as governor. Former Governor Samuel Pearson Goddard, who lost to Williams in 1966, again challenged Williams, losing to him in a repeat of the previous election cycle. Williams was sworn into his second term as governor on January 7, 1969.

== Republican primary ==
=== Candidates ===
- Jack Williams, incumbent governor

=== Results ===
Republican primary results
Party	Candidate	Votes	%
Republican	Jack Williams	91,274	100.00%
Total votes		91,274	100.00%

== Democratic primary ==
=== Candidates ===
- Samuel P. Goddard, former governor
- Currin V. Shields, director of the Institute of Government Research at the University of Arizona
- Jack DeVault

=== Results ===
Democratic primary results
Party	Candidate	Votes	%
Democratic	Sam Goddard	112,948	73.39%
Democratic	Currin V. Shields	30,337	19.71%
Democratic	Jack DeVault	10,613	6.90%
Total votes		153,898	100.00%

== General election ==
=== Results ===
Arizona gubernatorial election, 1968
Party	Candidate	Votes	%	±%
Republican	Jack Williams (incumbent)	279,923	57.84%	+4.06%
Democratic	Sam Goddard	204,075	42.16%	−4.06%
Majority		75,848	15.67%	
Total votes		483,998	100.00%	
Republican hold		Swing	+8.13%	

=== Results by county ===
County	Jack Williams Republican		Sam Goddard Democratic		Margin		Total votes cast
County	#	%	#	%	#	%	Total votes cast
Apache	1,986	47.92%	2,158	52.08%	-172	-4.15%	4,144
Cochise	6,942	42.42%	9,423	57.58%	-2,481	-15.16%	16,365
Coconino	6,151	55.53%	4,925	44.47%	1,226	11.07%	11,076
Gila	3,678	37.74%	6,067	62.26%	-2,389	-24.52%	9,745
Graham	2,289	45.64%	2,726	54.36%	-437	-8.71%	5,015
Greenlee	961	25.65%	2,785	74.35%	-1,824	-48.69%	3,746
Maricopa	179,786	66.42%	90,891	33.58%	88,895	32.84%	270,677
Mohave	3,320	52.43%	3,012	47.57%	308	4.86%	6,332
Navajo	4,725	53.45%	4,115	46.55%	610	6.90%	8,840
Pima	46,684	46.79%	53,095	53.21%	-6,411	-6.43%	99,779
Pinal	6,920	42.61%	9,322	57.39%	-2,402	-14.79%	16,242
Santa Cruz	1,290	36.16%	2,277	63.84%	-987	-27.67%	3,567
Yavapai	9,270	66.61%	4,646	33.39%	4,624	33.23%	13,916
Yuma	5,921	40.68%	8,633	59.32%	-2,712	-18.63%	14,554
Totals	279,923	57.84%	204,075	42.16%	75,848	15.67%	483,998
