= 1968 United States elections =

- ← 1966 1967 1968 1969 1970 → Presidential election year
- Election day: November 5
- Incumbent president: ▌Lyndon B. Johnson (D)
- Next Congress: 91st

Presidential election
- Partisan control: Republican gain
- Popular vote margin: Republican +0.7%
- Electoral vote
- Richard Nixon (R): 301
- Hubert Humphrey (D): 191
- George Wallace (AI): 46
- 1968 presidential election results. Red denotes states won by Nixon, blue denotes states won by Humphrey, and orange denotes states won by Wallace. Numbers indicate the electoral votes won by each candidate.

Senate elections
- Overall control: Democratic hold
- Seats contested: 34 of 100 seats
- Net seat change: Republican +5
- 1968 Senate results Democratic hold Democratic gain Republican hold Republican gain

House elections
- Overall control: Democratic hold
- Seats contested: All 435 voting members
- Popular vote margin: Democratic +1.7%
- Net seat change: Republican +5
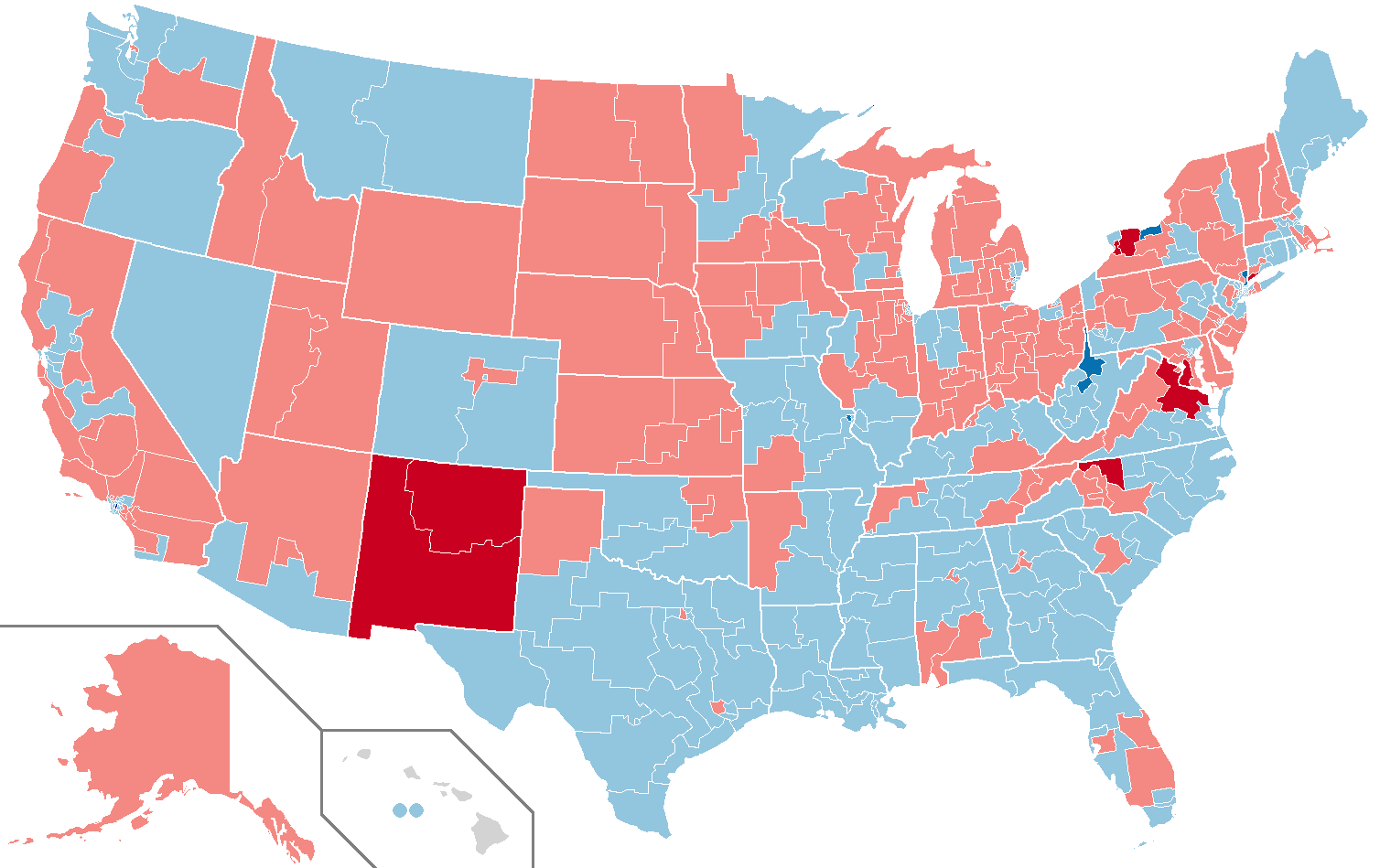
- 1968 House of Representatives results Democratic hold Democratic gain Republican hold Republican gain

Gubernatorial elections
- Seats contested: 22 (21 states, 1 territory)
- Net seat change: Republican +5
- 1968 gubernatorial election results Territorial races not shown Democratic hold Democratic gain Republican hold Republican gain

Elections were held on November 5, 1968, and elected members of the 91st United States Congress. The election took place during the Vietnam War, in the same year as the Tet Offensive, the assassination of Martin Luther King Jr., the assassination of Robert F. Kennedy, and the protests of 1968. The Republican Party won control of the presidency, and picked up seats in the House and Senate, although the Democratic Party retained control of Congress.

In the presidential election, Republican former Vice President Richard Nixon defeated Democratic incumbent Vice President Hubert Humphrey. Nixon won the popular vote by less than one point, but took most states outside the Northeast, and comfortably won the electoral vote. Former Alabama Governor George Wallace, of the American Independent Party, took 13.5% of the popular vote, and won the electoral votes of the Deep South. After incumbent Democratic President Lyndon B. Johnson declined to seek re-election, Humphrey won the Democratic nomination over Minnesota Senator Eugene McCarthy and South Dakota Senator George McGovern at the tumultuous 1968 Democratic National Convention. Nixon won the Republican nomination over New York Governor Nelson Rockefeller and California Governor Ronald Reagan. As of 2024, Wallace is the most recent third-party Presidential candidate to win a state's entire share of electoral votes. Nixon became the first former (non-sitting) vice president to win a presidential election; he was the only person to achieve that until former Vice President Joe Biden won the 2020 presidential election.

The Republican Party won a net gain of five seats in both the House and the Senate. However, the Democratic Party retained strong majorities in both houses of Congress. In the gubernatorial elections, the Republican Party picked up a net gain of five governorships. This was the second consecutive election cycle where the winning presidential party had coattails in both houses of Congress and the first for Republicans since 1952. This was also the first of two times since 1889 that a newly elected president's party failed to control either house of Congress, the other was 1988.

A number of ballot initiatives on a variety of subjects were on the ballot that year. Two states (Nebraska and North Dakota) had initiatives about lowering the voting age from 21 to 19 but they both did not pass. Maryland and Washington had housing discrimination related amendments. The Washington initiative was a veto referendum which passed requiring that discriminating based on "race, creed, color or national origin" would be grounds for one to lose a real estate license. The Maryland one was also a veto referendum that did not pass banning discrimination on grounds of "race, color, religious creed, national origin or ancestry" regarding selling, leasing, renting or financing housing.

== See also ==
- 1968 United States presidential election
- 1968 United States House of Representatives elections
- 1968 United States Senate elections
- 1968 United States gubernatorial elections
- 1968 United States ballot measures
