= Sam Goddard Jr. =

Governor of Arizona (1919–2006)

Samuel Pearson Goddard Jr.
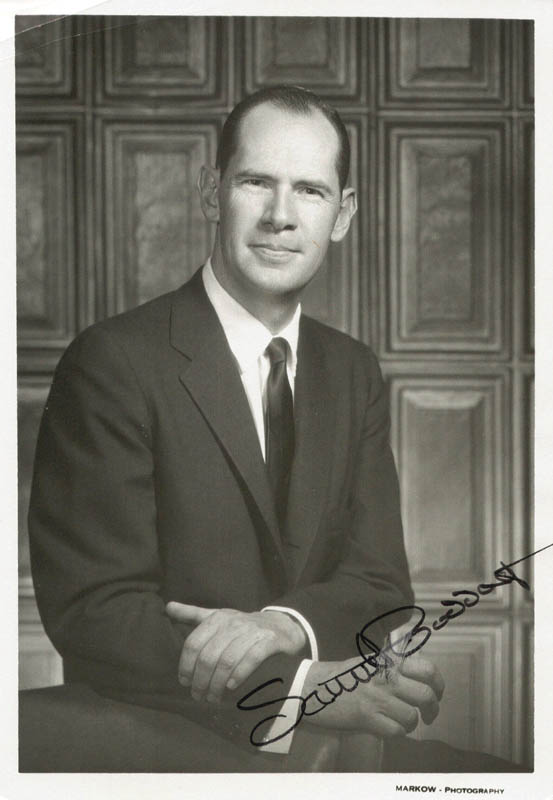

12th Governor of Arizona
- In office January 4, 1965 – January 2, 1967
- Preceded by: Paul Fannin
- Succeeded by: Jack Williams

Personal details
- Born: Samuel Pearson Goddard Jr. August 8, 1919 Clayton, Missouri, U.S.
- Died: February 1, 2006 (aged 86) Paradise Valley, Arizona, U.S.
- Party: Democratic
- Spouses: Julia Hatch (m. 1944; died 1999) Myra Ann Pearson (m. 1999)
- Children: 3 (including Terry)
- Education: Harvard University; University of Arizona College of Law

Military service
- Allegiance: United States
- Branch/service: U.S. Army Air Forces
- Years of service: 1941–1946
- Rank: Colonel
- Unit: Air Force Reserve
- Battles/wars: World War II

Samuel Pearson Goddard Jr. (August 8, 1919 – February 1, 2006) was an American politician who served as the 12th governor of Arizona from 1965 until 1967. He remained active in politics following his term in office, serving on the Democratic National Committee and as chairman of the Arizona Democratic State Committee.

== Early life and career ==
Goddard was born in Clayton, Missouri, a suburb of St. Louis, the son of Florence Hilton (née Denham) and Samuel Pearson Goddard. He attended Harvard University and was a member of the school's glee club and varsity crew team. His athletic efforts resulted in his induction into the Rowing Hall of Fame in 1976. Goddard graduated in 1941 with a Bachelor of Arts in history.

Soon after graduation, Goddard enlisted in the United States Army Air Corps as a private for World War II service. He was commissioned by the Air Corps in 1942 and served as an operations and communications officer in England, India, North Africa, and the South Pacific. He was discharged from the Air Corps in 1946 as a major, remained active in the Air Force Reserve, and rose to the rank of colonel.

Goddard married Julia "Judy" Hatch of Springfield, Illinois, in 1944. The couple chose to settle in Arizona upon a doctor's recommendation that the dry climate would help relieve Judy's rheumatoid arthritis. The marriage resulted in three sons, Terry (Mayor of Phoenix and Arizona Attorney General), Tim and Bill.

In 1946, Goddard purchased land in Tucson, near Swan Road and 22nd Street and built a home for his family. He developed the land into a subdivision that included extra large lots, homes that were set back from the street and restrictions that kept the area residential. The subdivision he called Aldea Linda or Beautiful Little Village, is listed on the National Register of Historic Places.

Goddard earned his law degree at the University of Arizona in 1949 and began practicing in Tucson.

Goddard became a widower in 1999 following the death of his first wife, former Arizona First Lady Judy Goddard. He died in Paradise Valley, Arizona. Goddard was survived by his three sons and his second wife, Myra Ann.

== Political career ==
He became a community leader, helped organize the Tucson Civic Chorus and the Tucson Watercolor Guild, and took an active role in charitable fundraising. In 1959, he became the chairman of the Tucson Youth Study Group and was selected as a member of the White House Conference on Youth and Children. His community efforts earned him the title Tucson Man of the Year 1959.

He first was elected chairman of the Arizona Democratic State Committee in 1960. In 1961–1962 he served as president of the 11 state Western Conference of United Funds. He became recognized as a rising power in Democratic politics in the state and in 1962 made an unsuccessful bid for the governorship. He ran for governor again in 1964, and this time won, beating future U.S. Attorney General Richard Kleindienst by 53–47%. Goddard's campaign symbol, the Arizona roadrunner, became familiar throughout the state, and it helped bolster his reputation as a man of energy who got things done.

As Governor, Goddard helped to organise a compromise amongst regional governors supporting the Colorado River Basin Project including the Central Arizona Project. This secured a reliable water source for the state, providing a foundation for the subsequent rapid economic population and economic growth that has occurred.

Governor Goddard signed a bill banning discrimination on grounds of race, gender, religion and ethnicity. He also established the state's first budget office and worked to improve relations with the Mexican state of Sonora.

He stood for re-election in 1966 but was defeated by Jack Williams, and lost to Williams again in 1968. Goddard also served as chair of the Arizona Democratic Party for 10 years and on the Democratic National Committee for 20 years.

Party political offices
Preceded by Lee Ackerman	Democratic nominee for Governor of Arizona; 1962, 1964, 1966, 1968	Succeeded by Raúl Héctor Castro
Political offices
Preceded by Paul Fannin	Governor of Arizona; 1965–1967	Succeeded by Jack Williams
