= Jack Williams (American politician) =

American radio announcer and politician (1909–1998)

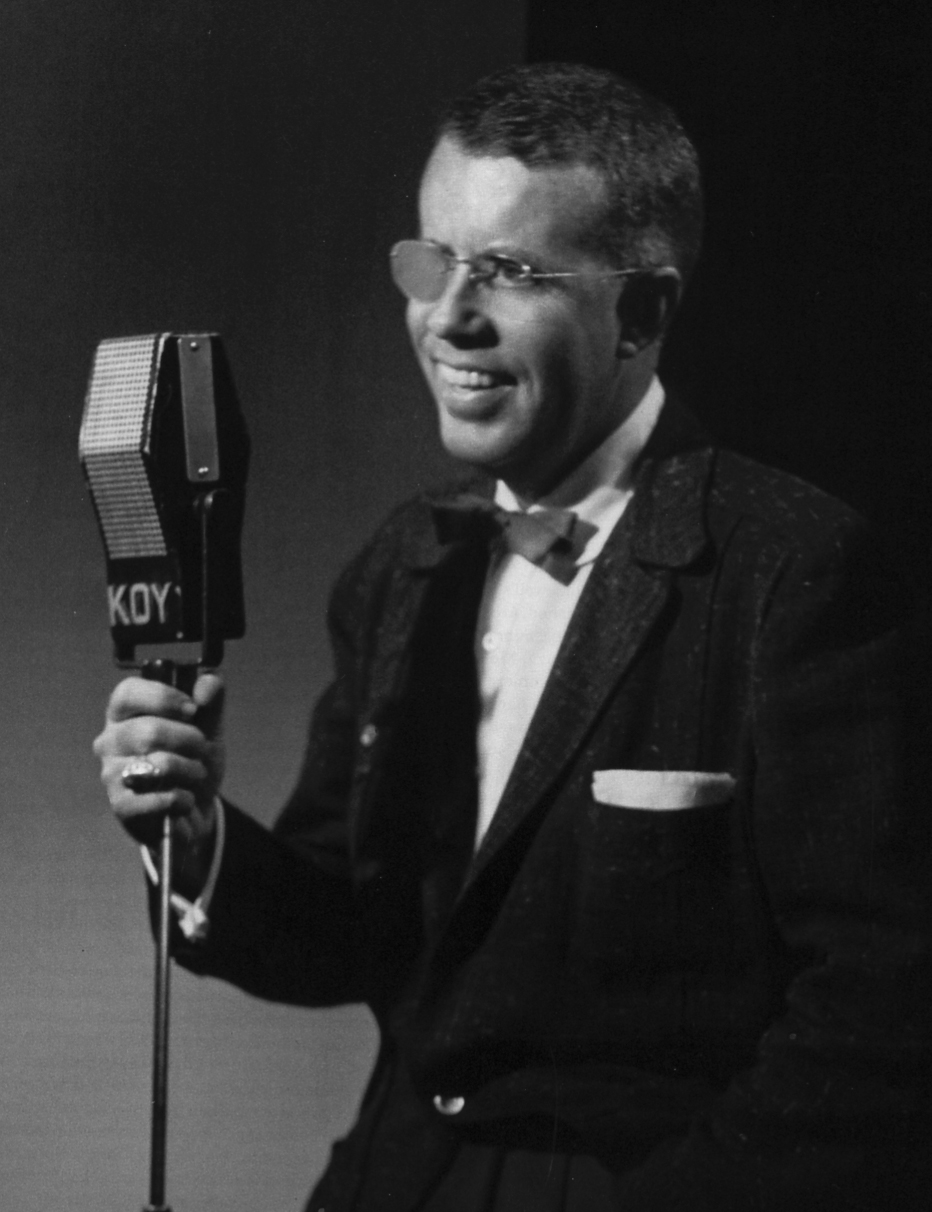

13th Governor of Arizona
- In office January 2, 1967 – January 6, 1975
- Preceded by: Samuel Pearson Goddard Jr.
- Succeeded by: Raúl H. Castro

47th Mayor of Phoenix
- In office January 3, 1956 – January 4, 1960
- Preceded by: Frank G. Murphy
- Succeeded by: Sam Mardian

Personal details
- Born: John Richard Williams; October 29, 1909 Los Angeles, California, U.S.
- Died: August 24, 1998 (aged 88) Phoenix, Arizona, U.S.
- Party: Republican
- Spouse: Vera May (m. 1942; died 1997)
- Education: Phoenix College
- Profession: Broadcaster; radio program director

John Richard Williams (October 29, 1909 – August 24, 1998) was an American radio announcer and politician. After gaining public recognition throughout Arizona because of his work in radio, he went on to become a two-term mayor of Phoenix, Arizona, and a three-term governor of Arizona. A constitutional amendment, approved by Arizona voters in 1968, resulted in Williams serving eight years as governor and being the first governor of Arizona to serve a four-year term.

As mayor of Phoenix, Williams led efforts to grow the city that produced a series of annexations and construction of new governmental buildings. As governor he focused primarily on economic development within the state. His final term as governor was marred by a recall effort, led by Cesar Chavez, in response to his signing of a farm labor bill into law.

== Early life and education ==
Williams was born to James and Laure (LaCossette) Williams in Los Angeles on October 29, 1909. His parents, who had met while both working at a Wells Fargo office in Los Angeles, were assigned to the Wells Fargo office in Ash Fork, Arizona, at the time of his birth but still made periodic trips to Los Angeles to visit his mother's family. While still a child, his family moved to Phoenix, Arizona, where Williams was raised. In 1915, while visiting Los Angeles, Williams was diagnosed with a malignant tumor behind his right eye. At that time, Marie Curie was in the city giving lectures and demonstrating the use of radium pellets. After surgical removal of the eye and tumor, his physicians – unsure how to proceed – asked Curie to assist with Williams' treatment. Radiation therapy administered by Curie was successful in halting the cancer but left his eye socket unable to accept a glass eye. Williams instead became known for wearing glasses with a frosted lens.

In 1924, Williams' father died suddenly. Williams graduated from Phoenix Union High School and enrolled at Phoenix Junior College (now Phoenix College). While in college he helped his family financially by writing press releases and holding part-time positions at the Phoenix Public Library and a local supermarket. Williams graduated from Phoenix Junior College in 1929.

== Early career ==
As he prepared for graduation in 1929, Williams found a job posting for a radio announcer at KOY. He applied for the position and was hired, beginning with a two-hour on-air shift each day. Williams began his radio career announcing songs and performing live advertisements for KOY. A couple months after starting, the station replaced him with a British actor. When the actor moved away from Phoenix several weeks later, Williams was rehired. By 1931 he had added news announcer to his list of duties with Williams rewriting stories from the Los Angeles Examiner or radio news services for the local audience.

With the election of 1932 approaching, Williams created a news program titled I Vote For in which he asked people from around the state who they intended to vote for and later played the recorded answers. This program was the first time either of Phoenix's two radio stations (KTAR being the second) left their studios to interact with the public. In 1936, KOY underwent a change of ownership. With the new management, Williams received a promotion to program director, a job title he would hold for the next 30 years. In his role at KOY, he would go on to host the commentary show Yours Sincerely. Williams opened each show with his signature line, "It's a beautiful day in Arizona. Leave us all enjoy it!".

On June 5, 1942, Williams married Vera May. The union produced three children: John Richard Jr., Micheal M., and Nikki.

== City politics ==
A member of the Phoenix Union High School Board of Education approached Williams in 1942, asking him to run for a seat on the Phoenix Elementary School District No. 1 board. Williams was initially reluctant but eventually agree to run, only to lose. The next year one of the three members of the Elementary School board was removed from office and Williams was appointed to fill the empty seat. Shortly after taking office he was made board president, a position he would retain until 1952. In addition to his seat on the school board, Williams became active in other civic and governmental activities. In 1946 he became president of Phoenix Junior Chamber of Commerce while he was vice president of the Phoenix Housing Authority from 1944 to 1947. The Phoenix Advertising Club named Williams Man of the Year in 1953.

Williams' biggest impact on the school board came in 1951 following passage of a law by the state legislature allowing districts to voluntarily desegregate. He joined with another board member to pass a measure, 2–1, that desegregated Phoenix elementary schools. To deal with concerns from the minority community that minority teachers would lose their jobs he announced a "quota system" for the hiring of teachers. To alleviate concerns of white parents with children assigned to predominantly minority classrooms he announced an "open school policy" allowing students to transfer to any other school in the district.

In 1952, one of Phoenix's city council members moved his residence outside city limits and was required to abandon his seat. Barry Goldwater, another member of the city council, nominated Williams to fill the remainder of the outgoing councilman's term. After his appointment to the seat, Williams quickly learned he did not enjoy the "squabbles" that dominated legislative process. An example of this came when the city council considered buying several privately held water companies from local businessman Spence Stewart in order to merge them into a municipal water company. Williams focused on whether the purchase made sense for the city while the majority of the council were concerned with "not making Spence Stewart a millionaire by buying his water companies". Williams declined to run when his partial term ended in 1954.

=== Mayor of Phoenix ===
The Charter Government Committee (CGC) asked Williams to run for mayor of Phoenix in mid-1955. The CGC, which dominated Phoenix city politics during the 1950s and 1960s, was a group organized to establish favorable business conditions in Phoenix and fight government corruption. Williams continued to host his daily radio show, Yours Sincerely during the campaign. He avoided speaking about campaign issues during the show, instead encouraging listeners to vote for the candidate of their choice in the days leading up to the election.

A big issue raised in early October was the city council voting to give all 411 city workers a pay raise. Williams' three opponents condemned the vote with one candidate saying "It looks to me like the council is trying to buy an election with the taxpayer's money" while a second candidate said it was a "Cheap political device aimed at getting votes at the cost of the city's welfare." Williams countered that the pay raise had been in consideration for several months and only came close to the election because of delays in the city council's vote. He attacked his opponents focus on the pay raise, claiming they were employing "oratorical gimmicks" and instead tried to focus on other problems facing Phoenix, including an antiquated sewage system. When the election results became available the morning after the election, Williams was found to have received more than twice as many votes as his three opponents combined. The day after the election, Williams used his radio show to thank the voters for their support.

Williams was sworn in as mayor on January 3, 1956. He also continued his radio work while in office. As mayor, he described his two major roles as helping "fill up head tables" and serving as the city's "official greeter". Shortly after taking office, Williams asked the people who had asked him to run what they thought was the city's greatest need. They told him the city needed to annex surrounding areas to prevent small enclaves from forming in areas that should become part of Phoenix. Towards this need, Williams called a number of special sessions where the city council voted to annex adjacent land into the city.

The CGC renominated Williams for a second term in 1957. Only a single challenger chose to run against him. As in his previous campaign, Williams avoided using his radio show to discuss campaign issues. In addition to races for various political offices, the voters in Phoenix were asked to approve a US$70-million bond package. On election day, Williams won a majority in every precinct within the city. The bond package was also approved.

Williams became more aggressive in his efforts to annex new areas during his second term. He also used his radio show to discuss the advantages of living in an incorporated area, including police and fire protection, health and sanitation services, parks and playgrounds, street repair, and zoning controls. His efforts to enlarge Phoenix were largely successful with the city adding 170 square miles (440 km^{2}) of new territory during his two terms. The bond package approved by the voters in 1957 was completed in late 1958. The resulting funds resulted in construction of a variety of public buildings in 1959. As his second term came to an end, Williams chose not to run for a third term.

== Governorship ==
Soon after he left office as mayor, Republican leaders within Arizona began lobbying Williams to run for governor. He instead returned to working full-time at KOY. Williams also began writing a regular column in the Phoenix Gazette. The combination of his work on radio and the newspaper kept him involved with state-wide politics. This changed in 1965 when Barry Goldwater and Paul Fannin convinced Williams to make a run. As part of the agreement between the men, Fannin, who had received assistance from Williams during his 1958 run for governor, promised to help Williams in his run.

As he began campaigning, Williams took a leave of absence from his position at KOY. This was done to avoid violating a 1959 change to the equal-time provision of the Fairness Doctrine and to allow him to campaign full-time. His opponents during the Republican primary were Arizona House Speaker John Haugh and former Arizona Attorney General Robert Pickrell. Haugh's political power was based in the southern section of the state. Williams was aided in Maricopa County by his increased name recognition from his time as mayor of Phoenix. Pickrell would quickly fall out of contention as the campaign developed. Williams and Haugh meanwhile ran on virtually identical platforms with both men promising to work more closely with the state legislature than the sitting governor. Results of the primary gave Williams a narrow victory over Haugh, with Pickrell finishing a distant third.

Campaign for the general election quickly turned nasty with the incumbent, Sam Goddard, accusing Williams of running a "scurrilous" campaign predicated on "invective and accusation and character assassination." Williams responded by claiming Goddard had "made more mistakes in twenty months than all the other governors since statehood" and accusing him of "behaved like a petty tyrant scolding his subjects." Mudslinging continued for the course of the campaign with both candidates questioning the qualifications of the other. Williams used self-deprecating humor to deflect his opponent's attacks and as election day approached claimed "For the past two months Sam Goddard has been so busy thinking up new names to call me he's forgotten to talk about the issues." In addition to his own victory, Williams saw his party do well in races for the state legislature. This resulted in Republicans winning control of both houses of the state legislature for the first time in Arizona history.

As governor, Williams kept a relatively low profile. As explained by the Arizona Republic, "... partly because the state constitution doesn't give the governor very much power. But it's more because Williams is neither charismatic nor flamboyant. He is basically a team player who believes in appointing good men to top posts and then allowing them to run their departments." Politically, he was a hard-line conservative who worked to minimize taxes, balance the state budget, and provide a favorable business environment. As a measure of his efforts toward economic development, Arizona saw state-wide employment rise from 548,000 to 803,400 during his three terms, while manufacturing employment rose 103 percent and bank deposits saw a two-and-a-half fold increase. The primary achievement of Williams' first term was an overhaul of the assessment process for property taxes. The process for determining assessed values varied between the state's counties, as Williams pointed out in his 1967 State of the State speech. The legislature responded to Williams by enacting a single assessment methodology to be used by all counties throughout the state. Additionally, his administration created the Indian Development District of Arizona to promote economic development on the states' reservations and Williams visited the tribal council of each of the state's 17 Indian tribes.

=== Second term ===
During the election of 1968, Williams once again faced Sam Goddard. The mudslinging and rhetoric that typified their previous campaign began again in early September. Williams used the results of his two years in office to deflect his opponent's attacks. In response to claims that he was "anti-education", Williams pointed out that the state's three universities had seen a 42 percent increase in spending during his two years in office. Challenges to changes in the state's tax code were met with Williams claiming he had produced the "first fair and equitable tax program for real property the State of Arizona has ever enjoyed." With a presidential election, U.S. Senate race, and three contested seats in the U.S. House of Representatives sharing the ballot with the governor's race, voter turn out was unusually high. Williams again received strong support from Maricopa County and won the rematch by roughly 89,000 votes.

On November 18, 1968, Williams returned to producing his radio show, Yours Sincerely. In addition to his previous commentary the show began including occasional reports from the governor's office. The show was only occasionally aired until 1970 when KOY's newly hired general manager, Gary Edens, saw the governor's show as an opportunity to increase the station's audience size. At that point the show was broadcast every morning.

By 1969, Vietnam War protests on the campuses of the state universities were threatening to become disruptive. Williams responded by developing a plan where any demonstration that appeared likely to turn violent generated a response by city police. County sheriffs deputies were then positioned behind the police with state Highway troopers announcing the Arizona National Guard would constitute the third line of defense. The system was expensive but following the period of social unrest Williams would state "I didn't have to kill anybody."

=== Third term ===
Williams' opponent in the election of 1970 was Raúl H. Castro. Unlike the previous two elections, both campaigns were fairly low key. The Arizona Republic called the race a contrast in personal styles with the primary issue being "whether the voters are in a mood for a change at the capitol." Another change, due to a constitutional amendment approved by the voters in 1968, was that Williams was running for a four-year term instead of the previous two-year terms. Polls shortly before election day were unable to determine a clear front runner but predicted that Williams needed a strong result in Maricopa County if he was to win reelection. Williams achieved a narrow victory, winning by 7,406 votes.

Williams' final term was marked by controversy over a state law dealing with farm labor. Among the provisions of the Farm Labor Bill (HB 2134), which the governor signed into law on May 11, 1972, was legal authorization for farm workers join labor unions and enter into collective bargaining agreements. The United Farm Workers, led by Cesar Chavez, however was unhappy about a provision of the farm bill that limited a union's ability to strike at harvest times and began a recall effort against Williams. Other concerns with the bill were a prohibition on secondary boycotts and the establishment of a mediation board to deal with labor disputes on farms.

In response to Chavez's call to action, 43 religious organizations labelled the bill "unfair" and asked for its repeal. From there a groundswell of support developed for the recall effort. Groups that joined the recall effort included various African-American, Chicano, and Native American groups along with the AFL–CIO and the National Organization for Women. Williams supporters countered with claims that the recall was aimed at the "wrong target" and did not have the ability to overturn an act of the state legislature. The recall effort began collecting petition signatures in mid-1973. By the time they were done recall supporters turned in 176,152 signatures to the Arizona Secretary of State for verification. The verification process found many of the signatures to be questionable, invalid, or to have been collected by petition circulators who were not registered to vote. As a result, the state Attorney General issued a ruling declaring the drive for a recall unsuccessful. The ruling was challenged, but it was not until 1976 that a federal judge ruled the Arizona Secretary of State's office had improperly rejected a number of signatures.

Among his other activities during his third term, Williams lobbied against daylight saving time in Arizona, informing the U.S. Congress that with the state's climate it would exchange a low-energy usage morning hour with a high-energy usage evening hour.

Williams chose not to seek reelection in 1974. Stress of dealing with the recall effort was partially responsible for his decision. As part of his announcement not to run, Williams stated "I have served longer consecutively than other governors in Arizona's history, and during some extremely trying times." Upon leaving the governor's office, Williams left a 53-page report on his time in office entitled Facts about Governor Williams and his Administration. No previous administration had produced such a report but the Arizona Republic editorialized "If they had, the report on Williams would not suffer by comparison."

== After office ==
With his departure from public office, the state media editorialized that Williams had performed his duties well, the Arizona Republic saying he could retire safe in the knowledge of a "job well done". An indication of his ability to nominate quality department heads came when his successor, Raúl Castro, asked for many of Williams' appointees to remain at their posts. Williams himself, upon leaving office, took his wife on an extended trip to South America.

With radio having transitioned to a music format, Williams was unable to return to his previous role as an announcer. He instead wrote his newspaper column, authored a book, engaged in public speaking, and traveled. From 1981 to 1994, Williams was a member of the Central Arizona Water Conservation District board.

Williams' wife died in December 1997. The former governor's health soon after took a noticeable decline. Williams died in his home on August 24, 1998. He had cancer and other ailments at the time of his death.

Political offices
Preceded by Samuel Pearson Goddard Jr.	Governor of Arizona; 1967–1975	Succeeded by Raúl Héctor Castro
Preceded by Frank G. Murphy	Mayor of Phoenix; 1956–1960	Succeeded by Sam Mardian
Party political offices
Preceded by Richard Kleindienst	Republican nominee for Governor of Arizona; 1966, 1968, 1970	Succeeded by Russell Williams
