= Rawghlie Clement Stanford =

American judge (1879–1963)

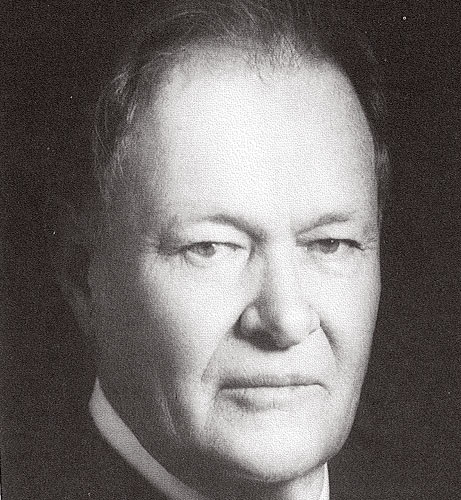

5th Governor of Arizona
- In office January 4, 1937 – January 2, 1939
- Preceded by: Benjamin B. Moeur
- Succeeded by: Robert T. Jones

17th Chief Justice, Arizona Supreme Court
- In office February 1945 – December 1948
- Preceded by: Henry D. Ross
- Succeeded by: Arthur T. LaPrade

Justice, Arizona Supreme Court
- In office 1943–1955
- Preceded by: Alfred C. Lockwood
- Succeeded by: Fred C. Struckmeyer, Jr.

Personal details
- Born: August 2, 1879 Buffalo Gap, Texas, U.S.
- Died: December 15, 1963 (aged 84) Phoenix, Arizona, U.S.
- Party: Democratic
- Spouse: Ruth Butchee (m. 1906–1957, her death)
- Children: 7

Rawghlie Clement Stanford (August 2, 1879 – December 15, 1963) was an American judge and politician who served as the fifth governor of Arizona from 1937 to 1939. He later served on the Arizona Supreme Court from 1943 until 1955, including three years as chief justice.

== Background ==
Born in Buffalo Gap, Texas, he moved with his family to Phoenix, Arizona in 1881 where he attended public schools and the Arizona Normal School. Stanford served with the 34th U.S. Volunteers in the Philippines (1899–1901), during the Spanish–American War. He studied at the Tempe Normal School and the Stanford University School of Law. He was admitted to the territorial bar at Tombstone in 1905. Stanford married Ruth Butchee (1880–1957), in 1906. They had seven children.

In 1909, he moved his law practice to Phoenix. Elected judge of Maricopa County Superior Court in 1914, Stanford served two terms (1915–1922). He presided over the 1916 gubernatorial contest between Thomas E. Campbell and George W. P. Hunt. Although he was a Democrat, Stanford ruled in favor of Republican challenger Campbell. The Arizona Supreme Court later overturned this decision and awarded the Governorship to Hunt.

Stanford served on the Board of Education for Phoenix Union High School from 1920 to 1936, and was chairman of the State Democratic Central Committee from 1928 to 1929.

Stanford's first foray into statewide politics came in 1920, when he ran against incumbent Senate Marcus A. Smith in the Democratic Primary. Stanford lost, coming in second place with 8,400 votes, to Smith's 10,910. Stanford narrowly edged out fellow lawyer Albinus A. Worsley, who came in third at 7,474 votes, and fourth-place finisher John W. Norton, with 2,651 votes.

His second attempt at statewide politics came in fourteen years later, when he ran in the Democratic gubernatorial Primary of 1934. A unique election, the top three vote-getters in the Democratic primary were either the incumbent Governor, a future Governor and a former Governor. Benjamin Baker Moeur came in first with 34,792 votes (36%), while Stanford received 29,088 votes (30%), and former 7-term Governor George Hunt (who Stanford decided an election for in 1916) came in third with 27,849 votes (29%). State Senator James Minotto came in fourth with 4,448 votes (5%).

In 1936 Stanford finally won a primary, defeating incumbent Governor Moeur by a decisive twelve percent of the vote. Stanford won 53,219 votes (56%) to the incumbent Governor's 41,764 (44%).

== Governorship ==
On November 3, 1936, Stanford was elected Governor of Arizona, winning a landslide with 70.68% of the vote against former Republican Governor Thomas Edward Campbell who only received 29.11%. The tally was 87,678 to 36,114 votes, with 260 votes going to the Socialist candidate. On January 4, 1937, he was sworn into office. During his term, Stanford dealt with the restoration of Arizona's economy, which deteriorated during the Great Depression. Declining to run for reelection in 1938, Stanford left office on January 2, 1939.

== Post-Governorship ==
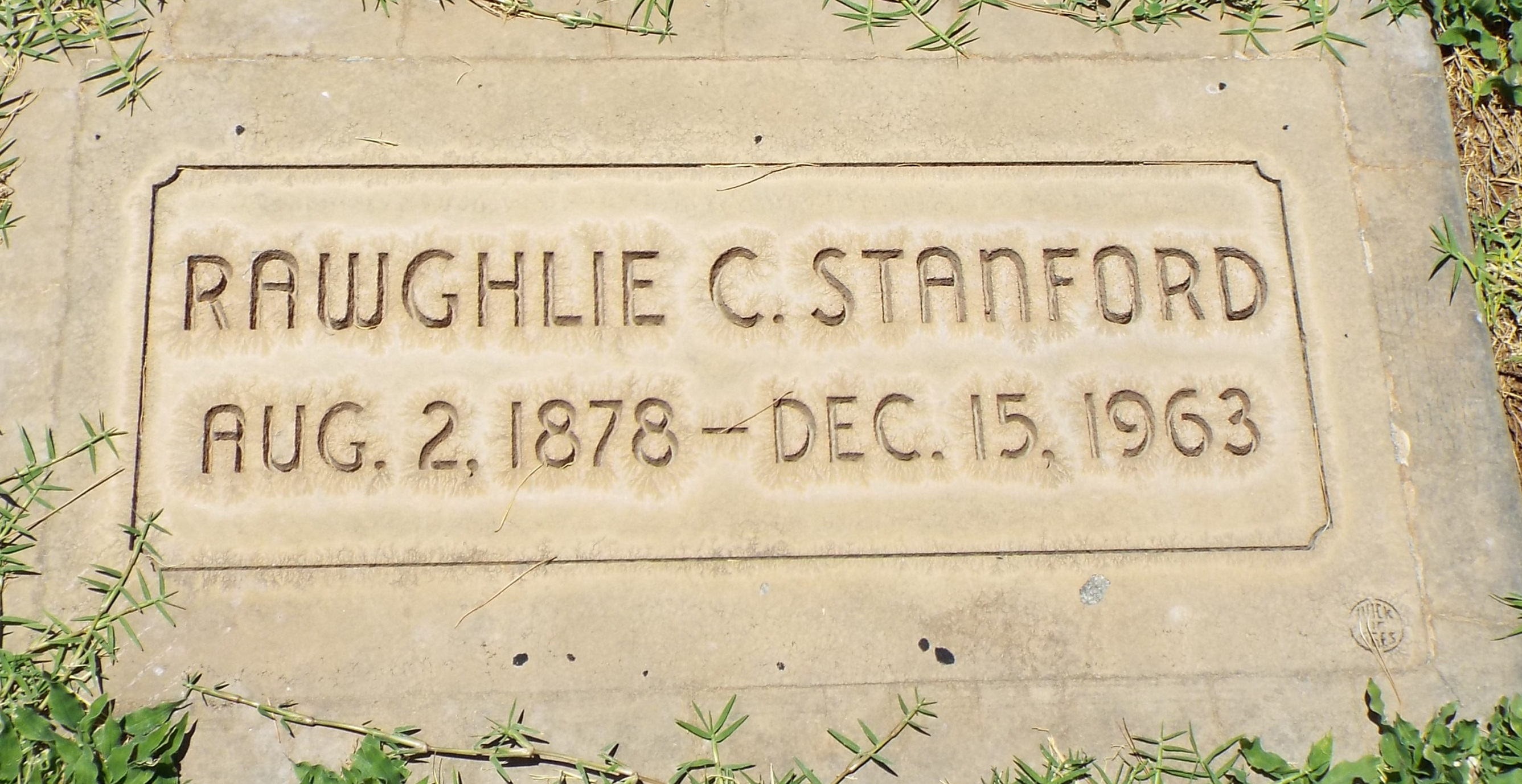
Grave site of Rawghlie Clement Stanford (1879–1963). He is buried in Greenwood Memory Lawn Cemetery in Phoenix, Az.

After a brief period in private law practice, he defeated Alfred C. Lockwood for a seat on the Arizona Supreme Court in 1943. Stanford served two terms (1943–1955) and retired as chief justice. He participated in more than 1,000 Supreme Court decisions, writing 200 of them. He was one of two men to serve as both Governor and chief justice of Arizona, the other being fellow Democrat Ernest McFarland.

Stanford was the state coordinator for the 1960 Kennedy-Johnson campaign and served as a presidential elector. The Democrats did not carry Arizona that year. He was involved in real estate as well. Stanford homesteaded and developed large tracts of land including a section north of the Arizona Canal and east of the Biltmore Hotel.

Stanford died December 15, 1963, and is buried in Greenwood/Memory Lawn Mortuary & Cemetery in Phoenix, Arizona.

Party political offices
Preceded by Benjamin Baker Moeur	Democratic nominee for Governor of Arizona; 1936	Succeeded by Robert Taylor Jones
Political offices
Preceded by Benjamin Baker Moeur	Governor of Arizona; 1937–1939	Succeeded by Robert Taylor Jones
Legal offices
Preceded by Alfred C. Lockwood	Justice of Arizona Supreme Court; January 1943–January 1955	Succeeded by Fred C. Struckmeyer, Jr.
Preceded by Henry D. Ross	Chief Justice of Arizona Supreme Court; February 1945–December 1948	Succeeded by Arthur T. LaPrade
Preceded by Levi Stewart Udall	Chief Justice of Arizona Supreme Court; January 1953–December 1953	Succeeded by Marlin T. Phelps
