= K. Berry Peterson =

American lawyer & politician (1891–1952)

5th Arizona Attorney General
- In office 1928–1933
- Governor: George W. P. Hunt
- Preceded by: John W. Murphy
- Succeeded by: Arthur T. LaPrade

County Attorney of Pima County
- In office 1922–1926
- Preceded by: George R. Darnell
- Succeeded by: Louis R. Kempf

Personal details
- Born: July 24, 1891 Alamo, Indiana, US
- Died: 1952 (aged 60–61) Tucson, Arizona, US
- Party: Democratic
- Profession: Attorney

K. Berry Peterson (July 24, 1891 – 1952) was an American lawyer and politician. He served as Attorney General of Arizona from 1928 to 1933.

== Life and career ==
Peterson was born in Montgomery County, Indiana in 1891, the son of Hannah N. Duckworth (born 1868) and Dr. Charles Arthur Peterson (1867–1928). Peterson earned his bachelor's degree in 1913 from the University of Oklahoma when he was 22 years old. He served in the Army during the First World War as a 1st Lieutenant of Cavalry. After the war, he attended law school at the University of Arizona, graduating in 1920.

In 1922, Peterson was elected Pima County Attorney. He was then Attorney General from 1929 to 1933. As Attorney General, Peterson filed suit against California for rights to the Colorado River and leading to numerous United States Supreme Court decisions in Arizona v. California. In 1932, he unsuccessfully ran for the Democratic nomination for Arizona governor against Benjamin Baker Moeur. Later, Peterson was appointed an assistant U.S. Attorney for Arizona.
