= Mit Simms =

American politician (1873–1957)

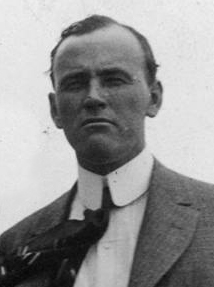
- Simms c. 1910s

2nd State Treasurer of Arizona
- In office January 6, 1947 – January 3, 1949
- Governor: Sidney P. Osborn; Dan Edward Garvey
- Preceded by: J. W. Kelly
- Succeeded by: William T. "Bill" Brooks
- In office January 7, 1935 – January 4, 1937
- Governor: Benjamin Baker Moeur
- Preceded by: W. M. Cox
- Succeeded by: Harry M. Moore
- In office January 5, 1931 – January 2, 1933
- Governor: George W. P. Hunt
- Preceded by: Charles R. Price
- Succeeded by: W. M. Cox
- In office January 4, 1915 – January 1, 1917
- Governor: George W. P. Hunt
- Preceded by: David F. Johnson
- Succeeded by: David F. Johnson

2nd Secretary of State of Arizona
- In office January 7, 1919 – January 3, 1921
- Governor: Thomas Edward Campbell
- Preceded by: Sidney Preston Osborn
- Succeeded by: Ernest R. Hall

Personal details
- Born: Milton Speer Simms; Aug. 12, 1873 Rockford, Alabama, U.S.
- Died: July 22, 1957 (aged 83) Phoenix, Arizona, U.S.
- Party: Democratic

Milton Speer "Mit" Simms, son of Maria Louisa Speer and Franklin Robert Simms, was born in Rockford, Alabama in 1873 and grew up there. He moved to Arizona Territory sometime before 1902. On December 25, 1902, he married his first wife, Lillian Mary McCabe (1881–1941). No children emerged from this marriage.

On September 12, 1910, he was elected Graham County Delegate to the Arizona Constitutional Convention. There, on December 9, 1910, he signed the Constitution of Arizona. He served as the 2nd Treasurer of Arizona for four non-consecutive terms from 1915 to 1917, from 1931 to 1933, from 1935 to 1937, and lastly from 1947 to 1949. He also served as the 2nd Secretary of State of Arizona from 1919 to 1921. He then served on the Arizona Corporation Commission from 1949 to 1954, and again from 1955 to 1957.

Simms failed runs include one for governor in 1920, where he lost to incumbent governor Thomas Edward Campbell in a nationally Republican year. He also ran for secretary of state in 1936 and 1938, but lost in the Democratic primary both times, first narrowly to incumbent James H. Kerby, and the second time to fellow Treasurer Harry M. Moore. Simm also ran for treasurer in 1942, but lost in the primary to James D. "Jim" Brush in a four-way race, narrowly coming in second.

Throughout his life he was a dry goods salesman, a Graham County recorder, a farmer, and a rancher.

On May 15, 1946, Simms married Sarah Loella Wright in Thatcher. Their marriage lasted until his death. She lived until August 23, 1969.

He died on July 22, 1957, at St. Joseph's Hospital in Phoenix, Arizona. His body was buried on July 25, 1958, in the Safford Union Cemetery in Safford (Graham County).

== Literature ==
- Goff, John S.: George W. P. Hunt and His Arizona, Socio Technical Publications, 1973, S. 279
- State of Arizona Department of State Annual Fiscal Year Report 2014, S. 8

Party political offices
Preceded by Fred T. Colter	Democratic nominee for Governor of Arizona; 1920	Succeeded by George W. P. Hunt
