= 1932 Arizona gubernatorial election =

- November 8, 1932
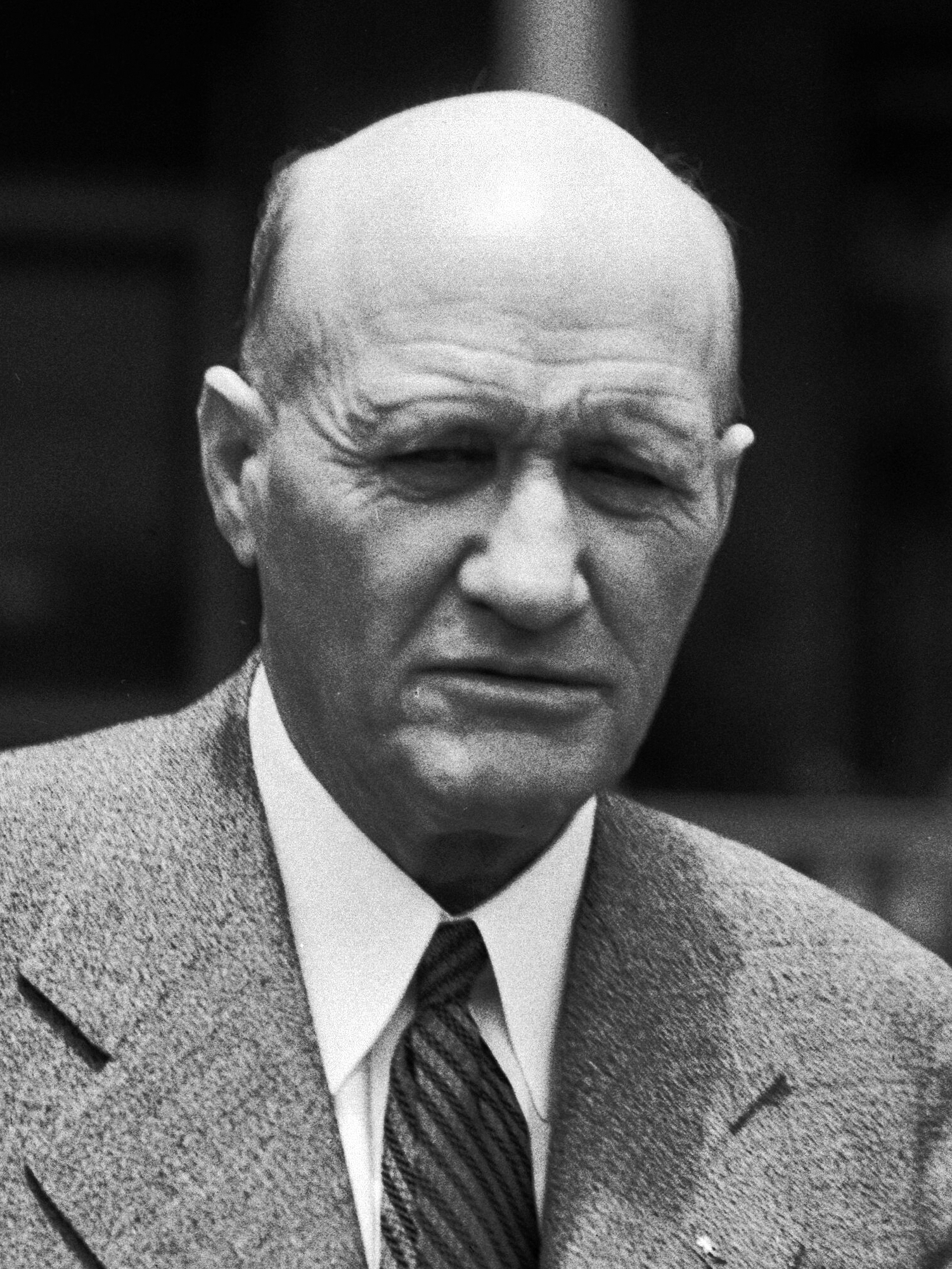

Nominee	Benjamin Baker Moeur	Jack Kinney
Party	Democratic	Republican
Popular vote	75,314	42,202
Percentage	63.22%	35.43%
- County results Moeur: 50–60% 60–70% 70–80% Kinney: 50–60%
Governor before election
George W. P. Hunt
Democratic
Elected Governor
Benjamin Baker Moeur
Democratic

The 1932 Arizona gubernatorial election took place on November 8, 1932. Incumbent Governor George W. P. Hunt sought the Democratic nomination but lost in the primary to Benjamin Baker Moeur. Moeur's pre-gubernatorial experience included serving as the Secretary of the Board of Education for Arizona State Teachers College, which later became Arizona State University.

Moeur defeated cattle rancher Jack Kinney in the general election and was sworn in as Arizona's fourth governor (excluding non-consecutive terms) on January 3, 1933.

== Democratic primary ==
The Democratic primary took place on September 13, 1932. Incumbent Governor George W. P. Hunt, who was elected to his seventh (non-consecutive) term over then-incumbent Governor John Calhoun Phillips in 1930, was opposed in the primary by Benjamin Baker Moeur, who had served as Secretary of the Board of Education for Arizona State Teacher's College prior to running for the office of Governor, as well as Attorney General K. Berry Peterson, State Senator Fred Sutter, and Webster C. Reed.

=== Candidates ===
- George W. P. Hunt, incumbent Governor, former Ambassador to Siam
- Benjamin Baker Moeur, Secretary of the Board of Education
- K. Berry Peterson, Attorney General of Arizona
- Fred Sutter, State Senator
- Webster C. Reed

=== Results ===
Democratic primary results
Party	Candidate	Votes	%
Democratic	Benjamin Baker Moeur	30,389	35.46%
Democratic	George W. P. Hunt (incumbent)	25,094	29.28%
Democratic	K. Berry Peterson	20,051	23.40%
Democratic	Fred Sutter	9,434	11.01%
Democratic	Webster C. Reed	727	0.85%
Total votes		85,695	100.00%

== Republican primary ==
=== Candidates ===
- J. C. "Jack" Kinney, cattle rancher
- W. W. Midgley, rancher
- William Walton

=== Results ===
Republican primary results
Party	Candidate	Votes	%
Republican	J. C. "Jack" Kinney	11,873	63.72%
Republican	W. W. Midgley	5,662	30.39%
Republican	William Walton	1,099	5.90%
Total votes		18,634	100.00%

== General election ==
Arizona gubernatorial election, 1932
Party	Candidate	Votes	%	±%
Democratic	Benjamin Baker Moeur	75,314	63.22%	+11.83%
Republican	J. C. "Jack" Kinney	42,202	35.43%	−13.18%
Socialist	Lawrence McGivern	826	0.69%	+0.69%
Arizona Progressive Democratic Party	Andrew Jackson Bettwy	584	0.49%	+0.49%
Communist	Martin Gehon	198	0.17%	+0.17%
Majority		33,112	27.80%	
Total votes		119,124	100.00%	
Democratic hold		Swing	+25.02%	

=== Results by county ===
County	Benjamin Baker Moeur Democratic		Jack C. Kinney Republican		Lawrence McGivern Socialist		Andrew Jackson Bettwy AZ Progressive Democratic		Martin Gehon Communist		Margin		Total votes cast
County	#	%	#	%	#	%	#	%	#	%	#	%	Total votes cast
Apache	1,101	53.68%	946	46.12%	1	0.05%	2	0.10%	1	0.05%	155	7.56%	2,051
Cochise	7,724	68.64%	3,290	29.24%	208	1.85%	29	0.26%	2	0.02%	4,434	39.40%	11,253
Coconino	2,402	63.09%	1,385	36.38%	14	0.37%	2	0.05%	4	0.11%	1,017	26.71%	3,807
Gila	4,441	65.74%	2,189	32.41%	79	1.17%	29	0.43%	17	0.25%	2,252	33.34%	6,755
Graham	3,006	78.18%	795	20.68%	16	0.42%	21	0.55%	7	0.18%	2,211	57.50%	3,845
Greenlee	1,588	79.56%	387	19.39%	1	0.05%	10	0.50%	10	0.50%	1,201	60.17%	1,996
Maricopa	29,118	65.08%	15,148	33.85%	110	0.25%	283	0.63%	86	0.19%	13,970	31.22%	44,745
Mohave	1,603	70.55%	633	27.86%	20	0.88%	8	0.35%	8	0.35%	970	42.69%	2,272
Navajo	2,479	59.71%	1,528	36.80%	144	3.47%	0	0.00%	1	0.02%	951	22.90%	4,152
Pima	8,403	47.16%	9,282	52.09%	48	0.27%	47	0.26%	39	0.22%	-879	-4.93%	17,819
Pinal	3,049	71.25%	1,210	28.28%	8	0.19%	8	0.19%	4	0.09%	1,839	42.98%	4,279
Santa Cruz	1,356	59.24%	821	35.87%	5	0.22%	106	4.63%	1	0.04%	535	23.37%	2,289
Yavapai	5,791	63.98%	3,148	34.78%	81	0.89%	20	0.22%	11	0.12%	2,643	29.20%	9,051
Yuma	3,253	67.63%	1,440	29.94%	91	1.89%	19	0.40%	7	0.15%	1,813	37.69%	4,810
Totals	75,314	63.22%	42,202	35.43%	826	0.69%	584	0.49%	198	0.17%	33,112	27.80%	119,124

==== Counties that flipped from Republican to Democratic ====
- Maricopa
- Santa Cruz
- Yavapai
- Yuma

== Bibliography ==
- Goff, John S. (1973). George The Fifth and Bibliographical and Biographical Notes (ed.). George W. P. Hunt and his Arizona. Phoenix: Socio-Technical Publications. pp. 159, 171–177, 273–277.
