= Frank H. Lyman =

American judge (1863–1957)

- Frank Lyman, circa 1940

Justice of the Arizona Supreme Court
- In office January 1, 1923 – January 5, 1925
- Preceded by: Edward G. Flanigan
- Succeeded by: Alfred C. Lockwood

1st County Attorney for Maricopa County, Arizona
- In office 1912–1915

Personal details
- Born: September 1, 1863 Greigsville, New York, U.S.
- Died: January 1, 1957 (aged 93) Phoenix, Arizona, U.S.
- Party: Democrat

Frank Hubbard Lyman (September 1, 1863 – January 1, 1957) was a justice of the Supreme Court of Arizona from January 1, 1923, to January 5, 1925.

Lyman was the first Maricopa County attorney and a pioneer in the Arizona judicial system. He served as a Maricopa Superior Court judge from June 15, 1915, until 1923, when he was elected to the Supreme Court of Arizona. He was unopposed in this special election to finish the last two years of Albert C. Baker's term.

Lyman later served as secretary of the Phoenix Waterworks Commission. He ran for, and came 2nd to former Governor George W. P. Hunt, in the Democratic primary for governor in 1930. He died on January 1, 1957, at the age of 93.
