= 1922 Arizona gubernatorial election =

- November 7, 1922
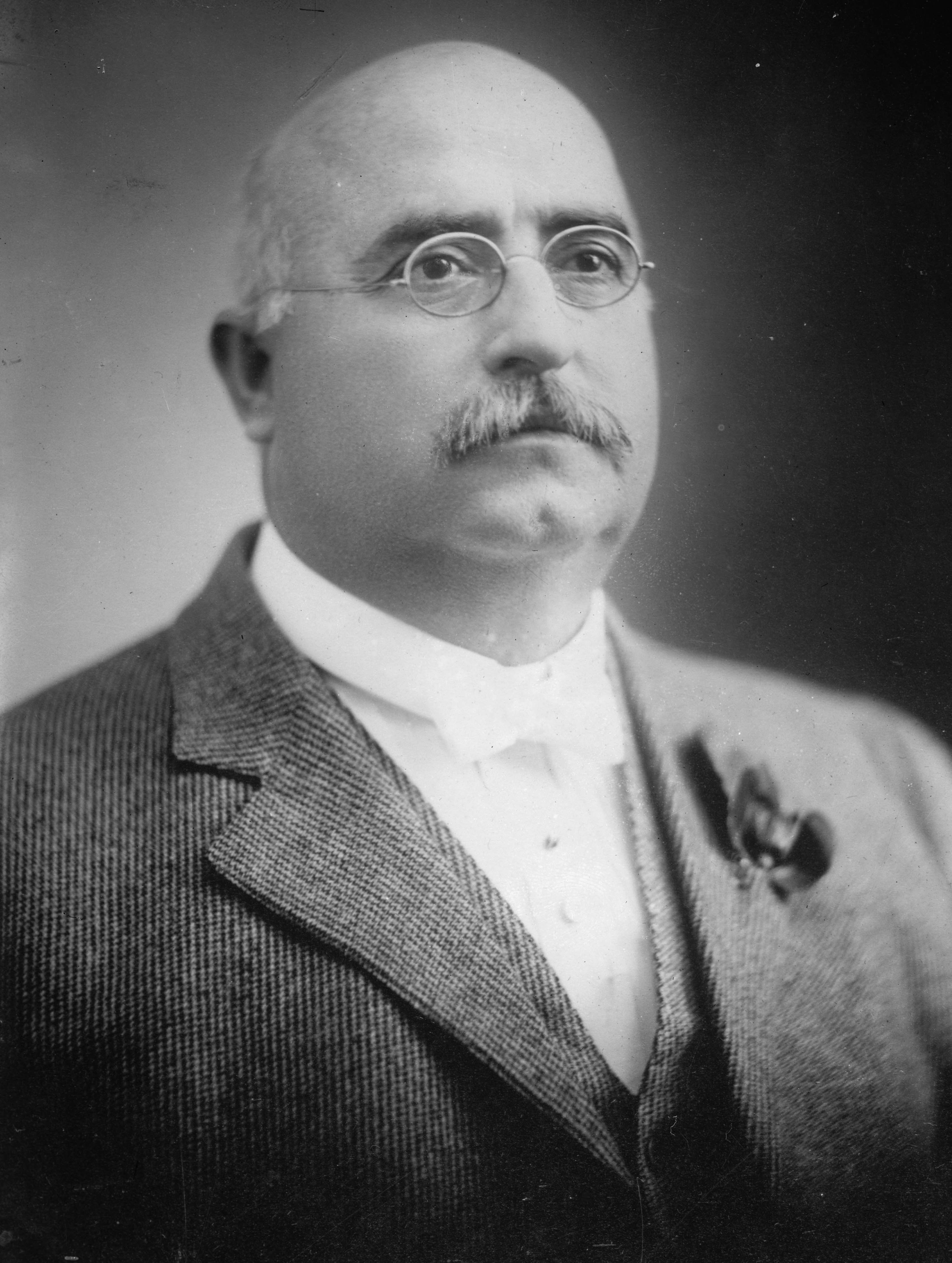

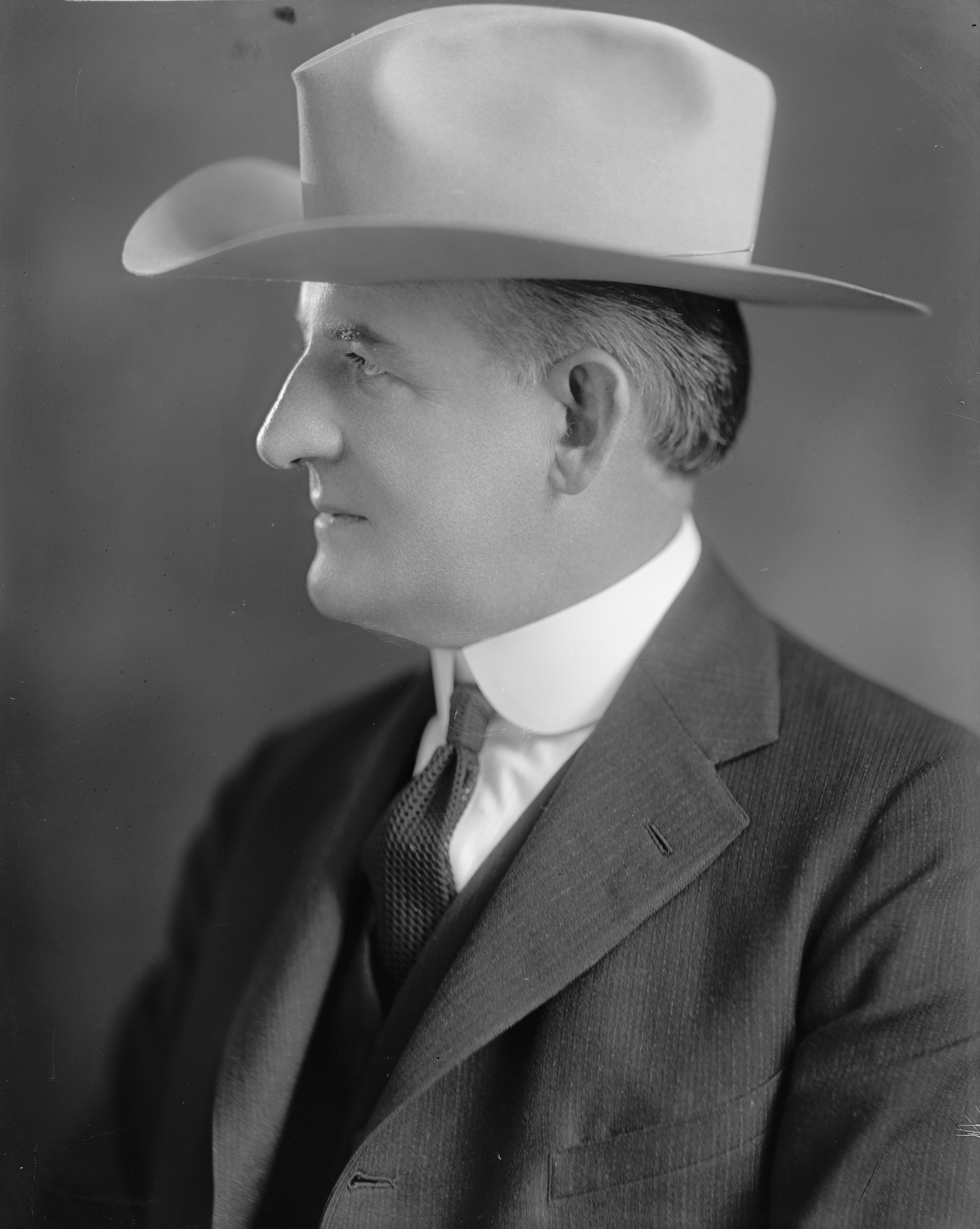
Nominee	George W. P. Hunt	Thomas E. Campbell
Party	Democratic	Republican
Popular vote	37,310	30,599
Percentage	54.94%	45.06%
- County results Hunt: 50–60% 60–70% Campbell: 50–60%
Governor before election
Thomas E. Campbell
Republican
Elected Governor
George W. P. Hunt
Democratic

The 1922 Arizona gubernatorial election took place on November 7, 1922. George W. P. Hunt was Arizona's first governor, after retiring in 1919 he served as Ambassador to Siam during the tail end of the Woodrow Wilson administration. After being dismissed by President Warren G. Harding, Hunt returned to Arizona and decided to contest his old seat. Both Hunt and Campbell faced off in 1916, the closest gubernatorial in Arizona history. This election was the highest percentage of votes Hunt ever got in his 7 gubernatorial races.

Governor W. P. Hunt was sworn in for a fourth term as governor on January 1, 1923.

== Democratic primary ==
=== Candidates ===
- George W. P. Hunt, former governor, ambassador to Siam
- Charles B. Ward, former Colorado attorney and state senator

=== Results ===
Democratic primary results
Party	Candidate	Votes	%
Democratic	George W. P. Hunt	21,243	54.98%
Democratic	Charles B. Ward	17,396	45.02%
Total votes		38,639	100.00%

== Republican primary ==
=== Candidates ===
- Thomas E. Campbell, incumbent governor

=== Results ===
Republican primary results
Party	Candidate	Votes	%
Republican	Thomas E. Campbell (incumbent)	10,050	100.00
Total votes		10,050	100.00

== General election ==
Arizona gubernatorial election, 1922
Party	Candidate	Votes	%	±%
Democratic	George W. P. Hunt	37,310	54.94%	+9.09%
Republican	Thomas E. Campbell (incumbent)	30,599	45.06%	−9.09%
Majority		6,711	9.88%	
Total votes		67,909	100.00%	
Democratic gain from Republican		Swing	+18.17%	

=== Results by county ===
County	George W. P. Hunt Democratic		Thomas E. Campbell Republican		Margin		Total votes cast
County	#	%	#	%	#	%	Total votes cast
Apache	700	51.24%	666	48.76%	34	2.49%	1,366
Cochise	5,047	56.91%	3,822	43.09%	1,225	13.81%	8,869
Coconino	1,246	56.43%	962	43.57%	284	12.86%	2,208
Gila	3,799	62.75%	2,255	37.25%	1,544	25.50%	6,054
Graham	1,311	55.60%	1,047	44.40%	264	11.20%	2,358
Greenlee	1,062	67.64%	508	32.36%	554	35.29%	1,570
Maricopa	11,196	53.57%	9,705	46.43%	1,491	7.13%	20,901
Mohave	1,366	69.34%	604	30.66%	762	38.68%	1,970
Navajo	1,053	50.12%	1,048	49.88%	5	0.24%	2,101
Pima	3,392	47.64%	3,728	52.36%	-336	-4.72%	7,120
Pinal	1,283	52.84%	1,145	47.16%	138	5.68%	2,428
Santa Cruz	872	53.17%	768	46.83%	104	6.34%	1,640
Yavapai	3,198	51.04%	3,068	48.96%	130	2.07%	6,266
Yuma	1,785	58.37%	1,273	41.63%	512	16.74%	3,058
Totals	37,310	54.94%	30,599	45.06%	6,711	9.88%	67,909

==== Counties that flipped from Republican to Democratic ====
- Apache
- Cochise
- Coconino
- Graham
- Maricopa
- Navajo
- Pinal
- Santa Cruz
- Yavapai
- Yuma

== Bibliography ==
- Goff, John S. (1973). "George The Fourth and Bibliographical and Biographical Notes". George W. P. Hunt and his Arizona. Phoenix: Socio-Technical Publications. pp. 141–144, 280.
- Dubin, Michael J. (2013). "Annual Summary". United States Gubernatorial Elections, 1912-1931: The Official Results by State and County. McFarland. p. 304.
