= 1936 Arizona gubernatorial election =

- November 3, 1936
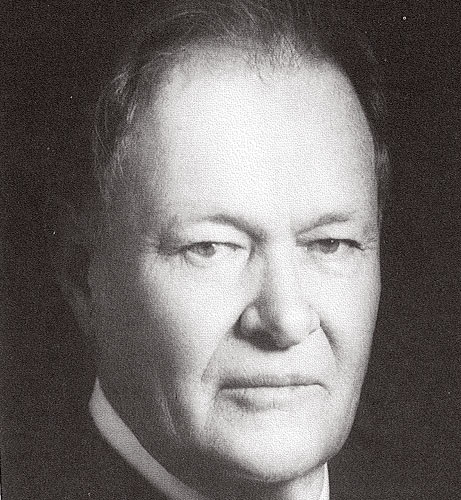

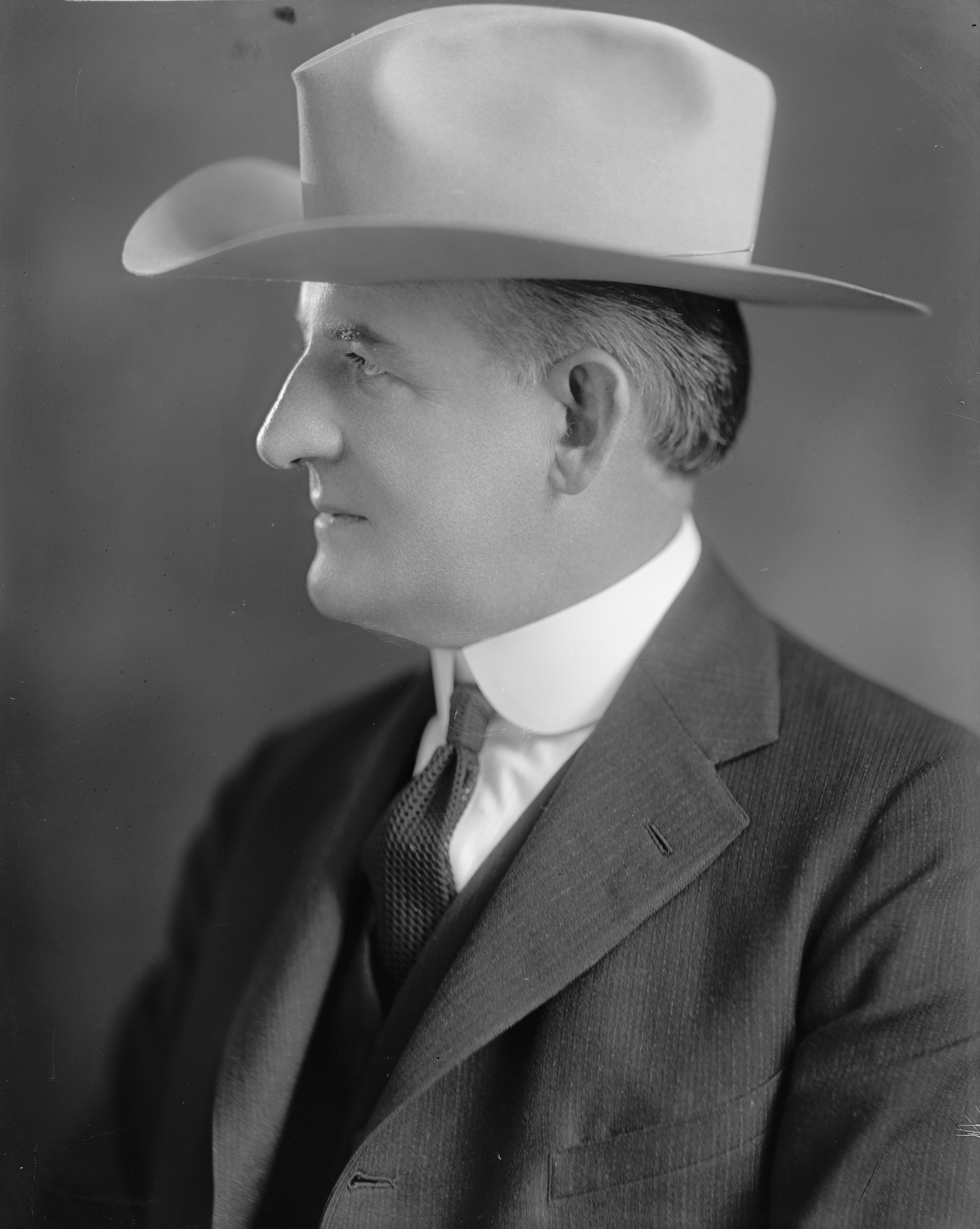
Nominee	Rawghlie Clement Stanford	Thomas Edward Campbell
Party	Democratic	Republican
Popular vote	87,678	36,114
Percentage	70.68%	29.11%
- County results Stanford: 60–70% 70–80% 80–90%
Governor before election
Benjamin Baker Moeur
Democratic
Elected Governor
Rawghlie Clement Stanford
Democratic

The 1936 Arizona gubernatorial election took place on November 3, 1936. Incumbent Governor Benjamin Baker Moeur ran for reelection, but he was defeated in the Democratic primary by former judge of the Maricopa County Superior Court Rawghlie Clement Stanford.

Rawghlie Clement Stanford defeated former Governor Thomas Edward Campbell by more than 40 points in the general election, and was sworn into his first and only term as governor on January 4, 1937, becoming Arizona's fifth governor.

== Democratic primary ==
The Democratic primary took place on September 8, 1936. Incumbent Governor Benjamin Baker Moeur was opposed in the primary by former Maricopa County Superior Court judge Rawghlie Clement Stanford, whom Moeur had defeated the previous election year in 1934.

=== Candidates ===
- Benjamin Baker Moeur, incumbent governor
- Rawghlie Clement Stanford, former judge of the Maricopa County Superior Court

=== Results ===
Democratic primary results
Party	Candidate	Votes	%
Democratic	Rawghlie Clement Stanford	53,219	56.03%
Democratic	Benjamin Baker Moeur (incumbent)	41,764	43.97%
Total votes		94,983	100.00%

== Republican primary ==
The Republican primary took place on September 8, 1936. Former Governor Thomas Edward Campbell, who was the first Republican to serve as governor of Arizona, ran for another term after leaving office in 1923. He was challenged by Phoenix Mayor John Hunt Udall.

=== Candidates ===
- Thomas Edward Campbell, former governor
- John Hunt Udall, mayor of Phoenix

=== Results ===
Republican primary results
Party	Candidate	Votes	%
Republican	Thomas Edward Campbell	5,848	61.18%
Republican	John Hunt Udall	3,711	38.82%
Total votes		9,559	100.00%

== General election ==
Arizona gubernatorial election, 1936
Party	Candidate	Votes	%	±%
Democratic	Rawghlie Clement Stanford	87,678	70.68%	+11.03%
Republican	Thomas Edward Campbell	36,114	29.11%	−9.04%
Socialist	D. J. Lindaman	260	0.21%	−1.62%
Majority		51,564	41.57%	
Total votes		124,052	100.00%	
Democratic hold		Swing	+20.07%	

=== Results by county ===
County	Rawghlie Clement Stanford Democratic		Thomas Edward Campbell Republican		D. J. Lindaman Socialist		Margin		Total votes cast
County	#	%	#	%	#	%	#	%	Total votes cast
Apache	1,661	70.53%	691	29.34%	3	0.13%	970	41.19%	2,355
Cochise	7,783	74.79%	2,566	24.66%	58	0.56%	5,217	50.13%	10,407
Coconino	2,446	64.39%	1,346	35.43%	7	0.18%	1,100	28.95%	3,799
Gila	5,254	78.97%	1,390	20.89%	9	0.14%	3,864	58.08%	6,653
Graham	3,440	77.65%	988	22.30%	2	0.05%	2,452	55.35%	4,430
Greenlee	1,560	88.24%	208	11.76%	0	0.00%	1,352	76.47%	1,768
Maricopa	34,098	71.83%	13,303	28.02%	69	0.15%	20,795	43.81%	47,470
Mohave	1,955	79.02%	506	20.45%	13	0.53%	1,449	58.57%	2,474
Navajo	2,852	68.49%	1,297	31.15%	15	0.36%	1,555	37.34%	4,164
Pima	11,502	61.80%	7,075	38.01%	36	0.19%	4,427	23.78%	18,613
Pinal	3,552	73.09%	1,305	26.85%	3	0.06%	2,247	46.23%	4,860
Santa Cruz	1,698	66.54%	851	33.35%	3	0.12%	847	33.19%	2,552
Yavapai	6,648	66.71%	3,290	33.01%	28	0.28%	3,358	33.69%	9,966
Yuma	3,229	71.11%	1,298	28.58%	14	0.31%	1,931	42.52%	4,541
Totals	87,678	70.68%	36,114	29.11%	260	0.21%	51,564	41.57%	124,052
