= John W. Murphy (Arizona politician) =

American politician and lawyer (1874–1947)

4th Arizona Attorney General
- In office 1923–1928
- Governor: George W. P. Hunt
- Preceded by: W. J. Galbraith
- Succeeded by: K. Berry Peterson

Member of the Arizona House of Representatives from the Gila County
- In office 1912–1914

County Attorney of Gila County
- In office 1918–1923

Personal details
- Born: 1874 Edgar County, Illinois
- Died: April 10, 1947 (age 73) Paris, Illinois
- Party: Democratic
- Profession: Attorney

John W. Murphy (1874 – April 10, 1947) was an American lawyer and Democratic politician who served as the Attorney General of Arizona from 1923 to 1928.

== Life and career ==
Murphy was born in Edgar County, Illinois. He studied law and worked as a prosecutor. In 1904 he moved to Arizona territory, settled in Globe, and worked as the Gila County Attorney. Murphy was in the 1st Arizona State Legislature. He was elected Attorney General of Arizona in 1922 and re-elected in 1924 and 1926.

While attorney general, Murphy oversaw enforcement of the Indian Citizenship Act.

== Death ==
On April 10, 1947, Murphy died at his sister's house in Paris, Illinois, when he was visiting.
