= 1934 Arizona gubernatorial election =

- November 6, 1934
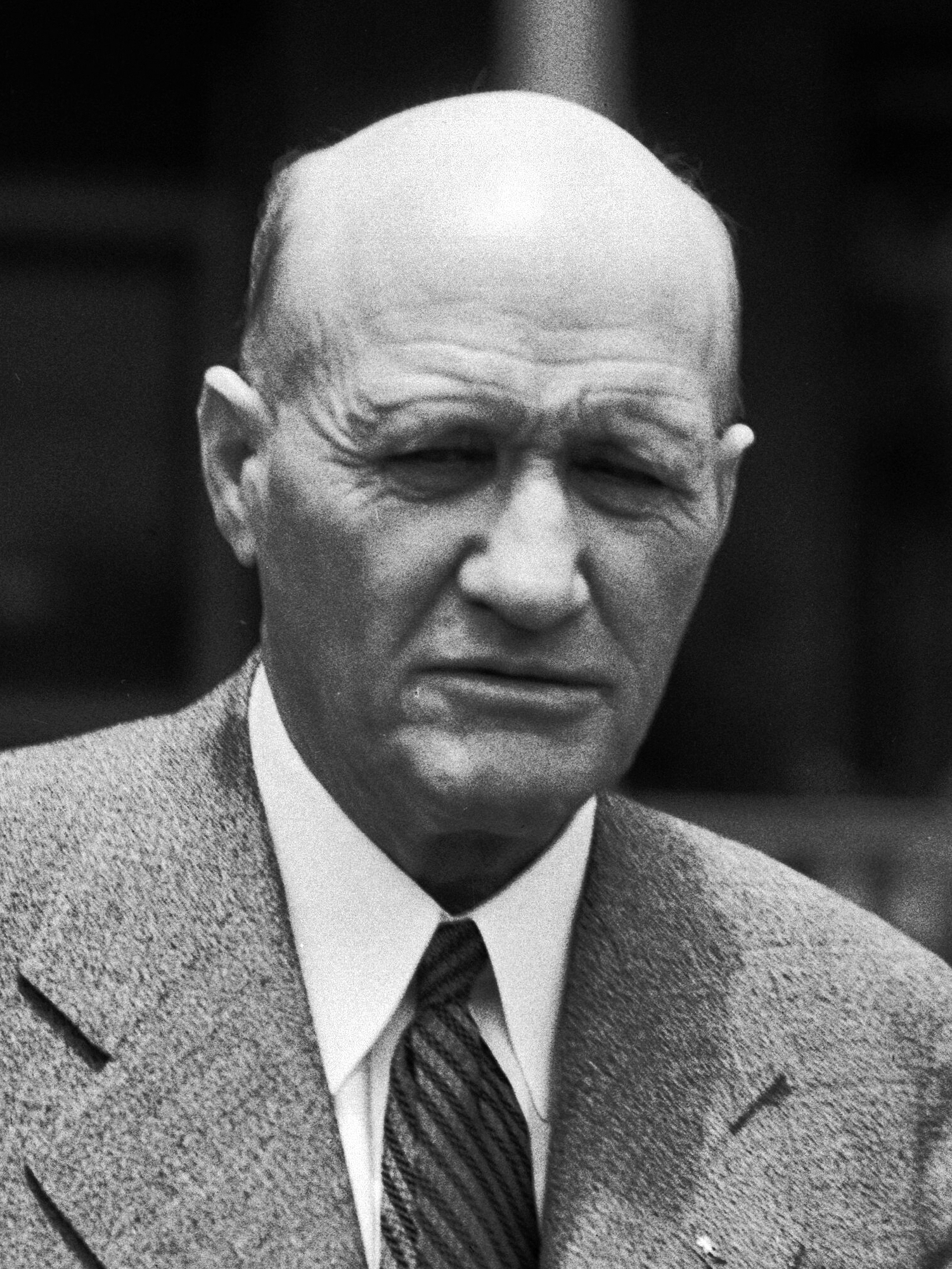

Nominee	Benjamin Baker Moeur	Thomas Maddock
Party	Democratic	Republican
Popular vote	61,355	39,242
Percentage	59.65%	38.15%
- County results Moeur: 50–60% 60–70% 70–80%
Governor before election
Benjamin Baker Moeur
Democratic
Elected Governor
Benjamin Baker Moeur
Democratic

The 1934 Arizona gubernatorial election took place on November 6, 1934. Incumbent Governor Benjamin Baker Moeur ran for reelection, he was challenged by former governor George W. P. Hunt and future Governor Rawghlie Clement Stanford in the Democratic primary, but he defeated both of them by a comfortable margin.

Benjamin Baker Moeur defeated Arizona State Highway Engineer and former Arizona Republican Party Chairman Thomas Maddock in the general election, and was sworn into his second term as governor on January 2, 1934.

== Democratic primary ==
The Democratic primary took place on September 11, 1934. Incumbent governor Benjamin Baker Moeur, who was elected to his first term over then-incumbent governor George W. P. Hunt in 1932 (whom Mouer defeated in the Democratic primary), was opposed in the primary again by Hunt, as well as former judge of the Maricopa County Superior Court Rawghlie Clement Stanford and State Senator James Minotto. This Democratic primary was interesting in that it included the current governor, a former governor, and a future governor.

This was former governor George W. P. Hunt's final run for Governor of Arizona, as he died later that year, on December 24, 1934.

=== Candidates ===
- Benjamin Baker Moeur, incumbent governor
- George W. P. Hunt, former governor, former ambassador to Siam
- Rawghlie Clement Stanford, former judge of the Maricopa County Superior Court
- James Minotto, state senator

=== Results ===
Democratic primary results
Party	Candidate	Votes	%
Democratic	Benjamin Baker Moeur (incumbent)	34,792	36.18%
Democratic	Rawghlie Clement Stanford	29,088	30.24%
Democratic	George W. P. Hunt	27,849	28.96%
Democratic	James Minotto	4,448	4.63%
Total votes		96,177	100.00%

== Republican primary ==
=== Candidates ===
- Thomas Maddock, Arizona State Highway Engineer, former Arizona Republican Party Chair, State Legislator

== General election ==
Arizona gubernatorial election, 1934
Party	Candidate	Votes	%	±%
Democratic	Benjamin Baker Moeur (incumbent)	61,355	59.65%	−3.57%
Republican	Thomas Maddock	39,242	38.15%	+2.73%
Socialist	Lawrence McGivern	1,884	1.83%	+1.14%
Communist	Clay Naff	374	0.36%	+0.20%
Majority		22,113	21.50%	−6.29%
Total votes		102,855	100.00%	
Democratic hold		Swing	-6.30%	

=== Results by county ===
County	Benjamin Baker Moeur Democratic		Thomas Maddock Republican		Lawrence McGivern Socialist		Clay Naff Communist		Margin		Total votes cast
County	#	%	#	%	#	%	#	%	#	%	Total votes cast
Apache	1,624	72.18%	625	27.78%	0	0.00%	1	0.04%	999	44.40%	2,250
Cochise	5,904	63.25%	2,770	29.68%	641	6.87%	19	0.20%	3,134	33.58%	9,334
Coconino	2,328	67.38%	1,101	31.87%	18	0.52%	8	0.23%	1,227	35.51%	3,455
Gila	3,165	51.05%	2,969	47.89%	54	0.87%	12	0.19%	196	3.16%	6,200
Graham	1,954	54.95%	1,577	44.35%	10	0.28%	15	0.42%	377	10.60%	3,556
Greenlee	1,089	67.35%	513	31.73%	5	0.31%	10	0.62%	576	35.62%	1,617
Maricopa	19,896	52.22%	17,772	46.64%	356	0.93%	79	0.21%	2,124	5.57%	38,103
Mohave	1,352	67.03%	5591	29.30%	49	2.43%	25	1.24%	761	37.73%	2,017
Navajo	2,586	71.67%	890	24.67%	130	3.60%	2	0.06%	1,696	47.01%	3,608
Pima	9,731	68.36%	4,223	29.67%	205	1.44%	76	0.53%	5,508	38.69%	14,235
Pinal	2,225	57.75%	1,558	40.44%	53	1.38%	17	0.44%	667	17.31%	3,853
Santa Cruz	1,430	75.42%	433	22.84%	22	1.16%	11	0.58%	997	52.58%	1,896
Yavapai	5,266	63.48%	2,740	33.03%	262	3.16%	27	0.33%	2,526	30.45%	8,295
Yuma	2,805	63.23%	1,480	33.36%	79	1.78%	72	1.62%	1,325	29.87%	4,436
Totals	61,355	59.65%	39,242	38.15%	1,884	1.83%	374	0.36%	22,113	21.50%	102,855

==== Counties that flipped from Republican to Democratic ====
- Pima

== Bibliography ==
- Goff, John S. (1973). George The Fifth and Bibliographical and Biographical Notes (ed.). George W. P. Hunt and his Arizona. Phoenix: Socio-Technical Publications. pp. 159, 171–177, 273–277.
