= 1928 Arizona gubernatorial election =

- November 6, 1928
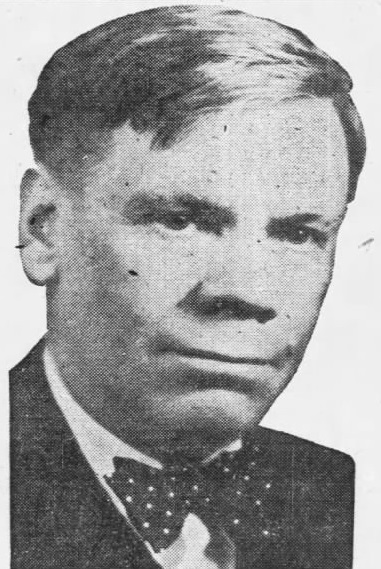

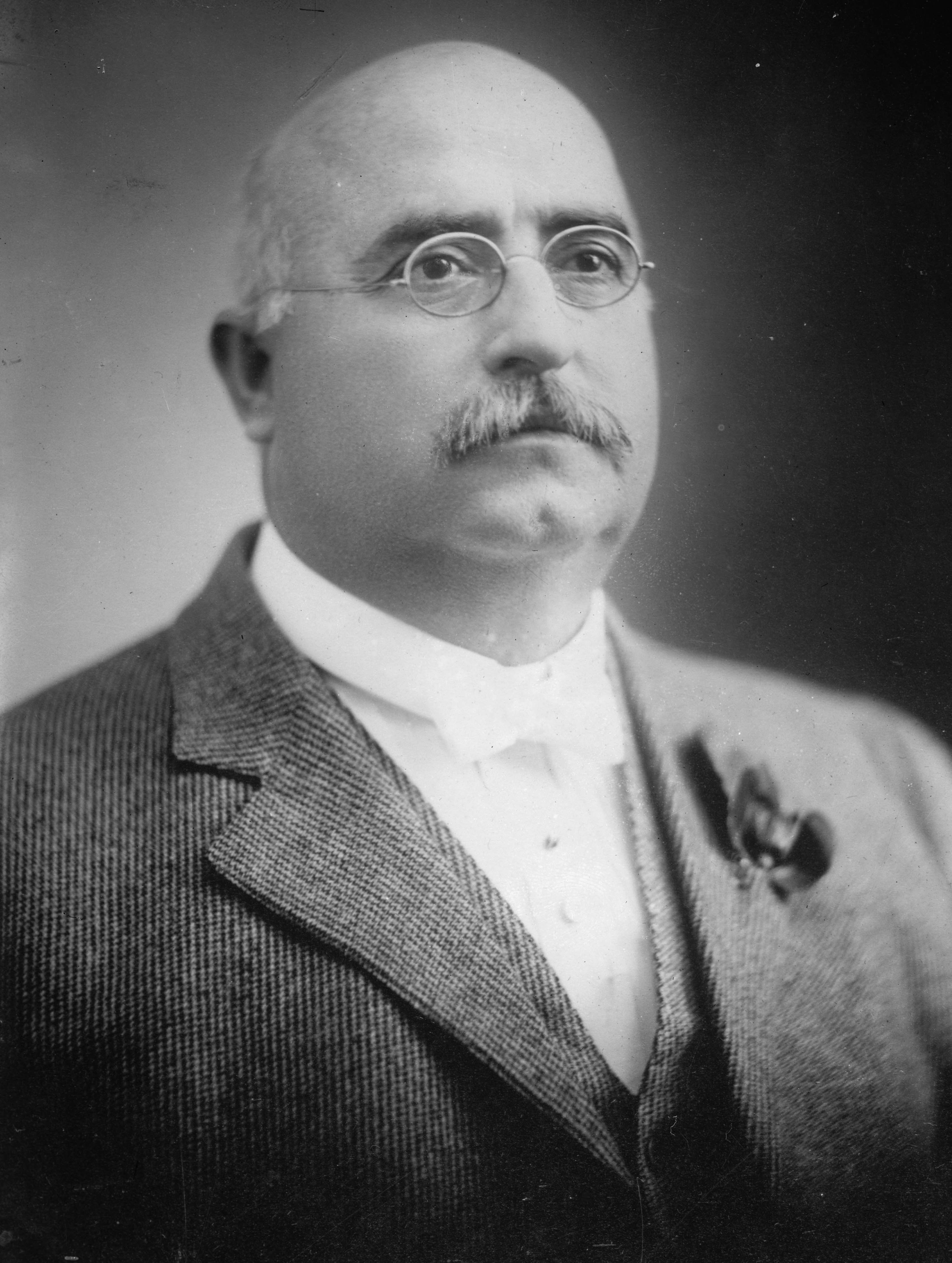
Nominee	John Calhoun Phillips	George W. P. Hunt
Party	Republican	Democratic
Popular vote	47,829	44,553
Percentage	51.71%	48.16%
- County results Phillips: 50–60% 60–70% Hunt: 50–60% 60–70%
Governor before election
George W. P. Hunt
Democratic
Elected Governor
John C. Phillips
Republican

The 1928 Arizona gubernatorial election took place on November 6, 1928. Despite a fairly poor economy, a 15-point loss by Al Smith for the Arizona electoral votes, and having served for nearly 6 full terms, Hunt only narrowly lost the general election. Other state Democrats like Senator Ashurst and Representative Douglas both won re-election. John C. Phillips became the second Republican to serve as Arizona Governor, and the first to beat Hunt in a general election.

John Calhoun Phillips was sworn in for his first and only term as Governor on January 7, 1929.

== Democratic primary ==
=== Candidates ===
- George W. P. Hunt, incumbent Governor, former Ambassador to Siam
- James H. Kerby, then-incumbent Secretary of State

=== Results ===
Democratic primary results
Party	Candidate	Votes	%
Democratic	George W. P. Hunt (incumbent)	27,876	58.51%
Democratic	James H. Kerby	19,769	41.49%
Total votes		47,645	100.00%

== Republican primary ==
=== Candidates ===
- John Calhoun Phillips, former state House and Senate member.
- John Hunt Udall, clerk of the Arizona Superior Court.
- Celora M. Stoddard, member of the Arizona State Senate from 1921 to 1923.

=== Results ===
Republican primary results
Party	Candidate	Votes	%
Republican	John Calhoun Phillips	7,253	44.08%
Republican	John Hunt Udall	6,136	37.29%
Republican	Celora M. Stoddard	3,065	18.63%
Total votes		16,454	100.00%

== General election ==
Arizona gubernatorial election, 1928
Party	Candidate	Votes	%	±%
Republican	John Calhoun Phillips	47,829	51.71%	+1.96%
Democratic	George W. P. Hunt (incumbent)	44,553	48.16%	−2.09%
Workers	William O'Brien	122	0.13%	+0.13%
Majority		3,276	3.54%	
Total votes		92,504	100.00%	
Republican gain from Democratic		Swing	+4.04%	

=== Results by county ===
County	John C. Phillips Republican		George W. P. Hunt Democratic		William O'Brien Workers		Margin		Total votes cast
County	#	%	#	%	#	%	#	%	Total votes cast
Apache	662	39.13%	1,029	60.82%	1	0.06%	-367	-21.69%	1,692
Cochise	5,245	51.43%	4,937	48.41%	17	0.17%	308	3.02%	10,199
Coconino	1,461	49.04%	1,513	50.79%	5	0.17%	-52	-1.75%	2,979
Gila	2,819	40.93%	4,062	58.98%	6	0.09%	-1,243	-18.05%	6,887
Graham	1,481	49.66%	1,499	50.27%	2	0.07%	-18	-0.60%	2,982
Greenlee	545	33.42%	1,081	66.28%	5	0.31%	-536	-32.86%	1,631
Maricopa	18,754	57.39%	13,899	42.53%	26	0.08%	4,855	14.86%	32,679
Mohave	1,182	62.84%	694	36.90%	5	0.27%	488	25.94%	1,881
Navajo	1,223	39.97%	1,835	59.97%	2	0.07%	-612	-20.00%	3,060
Pima	6,255	53.26%	5,461	46.50%	29	0.25%	794	6.76%	11,745
Pinal	1,440	47.26%	1,605	52.67%	2	0.07%	-165	-5.42%	3,047
Santa Cruz	873	45.95%	1,025	53.95%	2	0.11%	-152	-8.00%	1,900
Yavapai	3,985	50.80%	3,846	49.02%	14	0.18%	139	1.77%	7,845
Yuma	1,904	47.88%	2,067	51.97%	6	0.15%	-163	-4.10%	3,977
Totals	47,829	51.70%	44,553	48.16%	122	0.13%	3,276	3.54%	92,504

==== Counties that flipped from Democratic to Republican ====
- Yavapai

==== Counties that flipped from Republican to Democratic ====
- Santa Cruz

== Bibliography ==
- Goff, John S. (1973). George The Fifth and Bibliographical and Biographical Notes (ed.). George W. P. Hunt and his Arizona. Phoenix: Socio-Technical Publications. pp. 159, 171–177, 273–277.
