= 1926 Arizona gubernatorial election =

- November 2, 1926
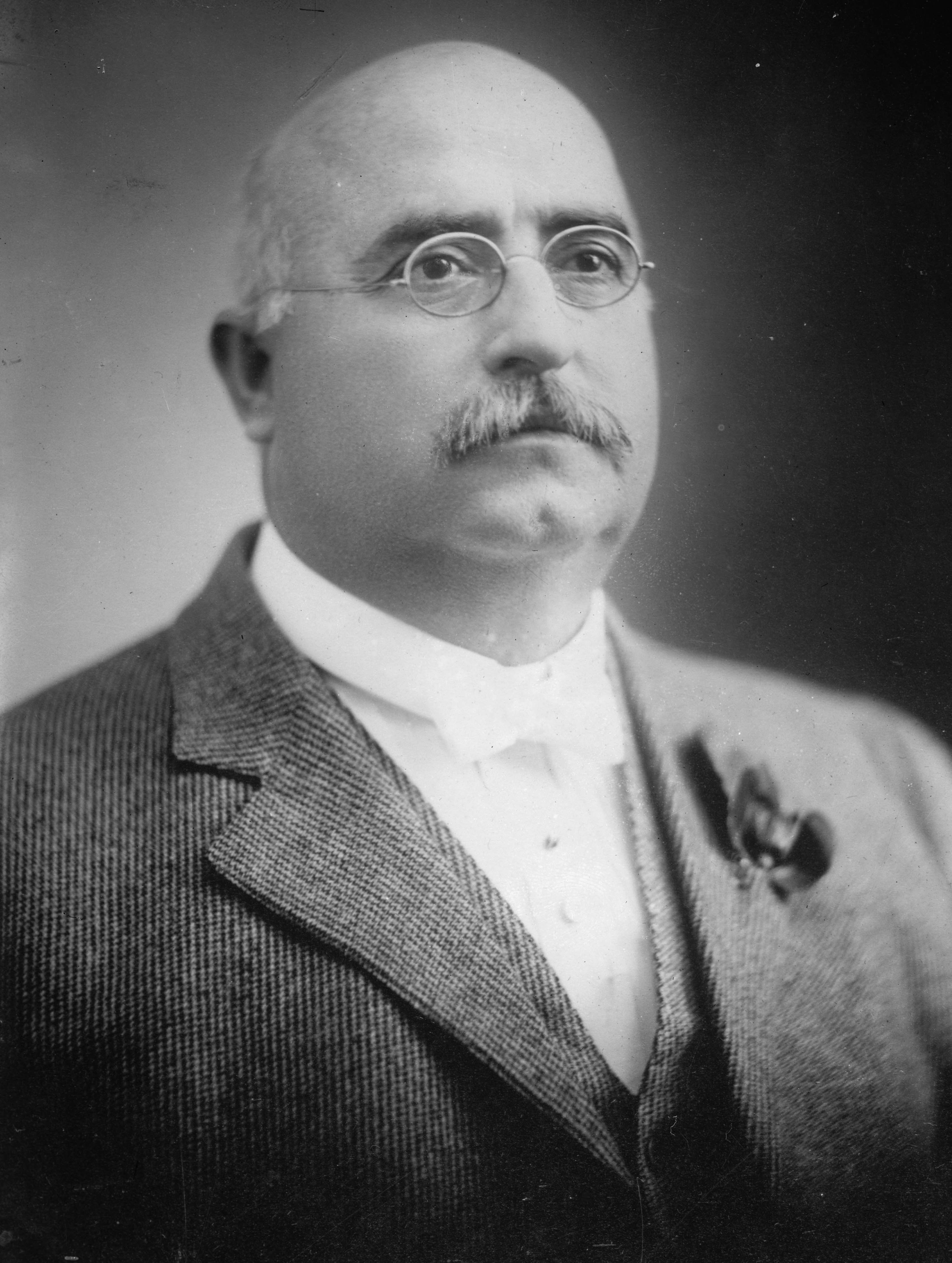

Nominee	George W. P. Hunt	Elias S. Clark
Party	Democratic	Republican
Popular vote	39,979	39,580
Percentage	50.25%	49.75%
- County results Hunt: 50–60% 60–70% Clark: 50–60%
Governor before election
George W. P. Hunt
Democratic
Elected Governor
George W. P. Hunt
Democratic

The 1926 Arizona gubernatorial election took place on November 2, 1926. Despite being a Democratic year generally, Hunt barely managed to be re-elected against his Republican opponent Elias Clark. Hunt had been governor for around 11 out of the State of Arizona's 14 years, coupled with his age and with issues regarding the Colorado River Compact, he was running out of steam. Despite that Hunt narrowly prevailed and won.

Governor W. P. Hunt was sworn in for a sixth term as governor on January 3, 1927.

== Democratic primary ==
=== Candidates ===
- George W. P. Hunt, incumbent governor, former ambassador to Siam
- Everett E. Ellinwood, district attorney for territorial Arizona (1893–1898), Regent for the U of A
- J. J. Cox, state senator

=== Results ===
Democratic primary results
Party	Candidate	Votes	%
Democratic	George W. P. Hunt (incumbent)	26,155	49.25%
Democratic	Everett E. Ellinwood	16,057	30.24%
Democratic	J.J. Cox	10,890	20.51%
Total votes		53,120	100.00

== Republican primary ==
=== Candidates ===
- E. S. Clark, Arizona Territorial Attorney General
- Thomas Maddock, Republican nominee for Representative in 1918, and as governor in 1934

=== Results ===
Republican primary results
Party	Candidate	Votes	%
Republican	Elias S. Clark	8,294	54.06%
Republican	Thomas Maddock	7,048	45.94%
Total votes		15,342	100.00

== General election ==
Arizona gubernatorial election, 1926
Party	Candidate	Votes	%	±%
Democratic	George W. P. Hunt (incumbent)	39,979	50.25%	−0.28%
Republican	Elias S. Clark	37,580	49.75%	+0.28%
Majority		399	0.50%	
Total votes		77,559	100.00%	
Democratic hold		Swing	+0.50%	

=== Results by county ===
County	George W. P. Hunt Democratic		Elias S. Clark Republican		Margin		Total votes cast
County	#	%	#	%	#	%	Total votes cast
Apache	753	51.36%	713	48.64%	40	2.73%	1,466
Cochise	4,564	48.60%	4,826	51.40%	-262	-2.79%	9,390
Coconino	1,464	55.16%	1,190	44.84%	274	10.32%	2,654
Gila	3,612	56.10%	2,826	43.90%	786	12.21%	6,438
Graham	1,561	56.15%	1,219	43.85%	342	12.30%	2,780
Greenlee	936	61.86%	577	38.14%	359	23.73%	1,513
Maricopa	12,036	45.91%	14,178	54.09%	-2,142	-8.17%	26,214
Mohave	744	41.22%	1,061	58.78%	-317	-17.56%	1,805
Navajo	1,346	54.58%	1,120	45.42%	226	9.16%	2,466
Pima	4,624	48.02%	5,005	51.98%	-381	-3.96%	9,629
Pinal	1,514	55.40%	1,219	44.60%	295	10.79%	2,733
Santa Cruz	771	49.58%	784	50.42%	-13	-0.84%	1,555
Yavapai	3,979	54.94%	3,263	45.06%	716	9.89%	7,242
Yuma	2,075	56.48%	1,599	43.52%	476	12.96%	3,674
Totals	39,979	50.25%	39,580	49.75%	399	0.50%	79,559

==== Counties that flipped from Republican to Democratic ====
- Coconino
- Navajo
- Yavapai
- Yuma

==== Counties that flipped from Democratic to Republican ====
- Santa Cruz

== Bibliography ==
- Goff, John S. (1973). George The Fifth and Bibliographical and Biographical Notes (ed.). George W. P. Hunt and his Arizona. Phoenix: Socio-Technical Publications. pp. 159, 171–177, 273–277.
