= 1930 Arizona gubernatorial election =

- November 4, 1930
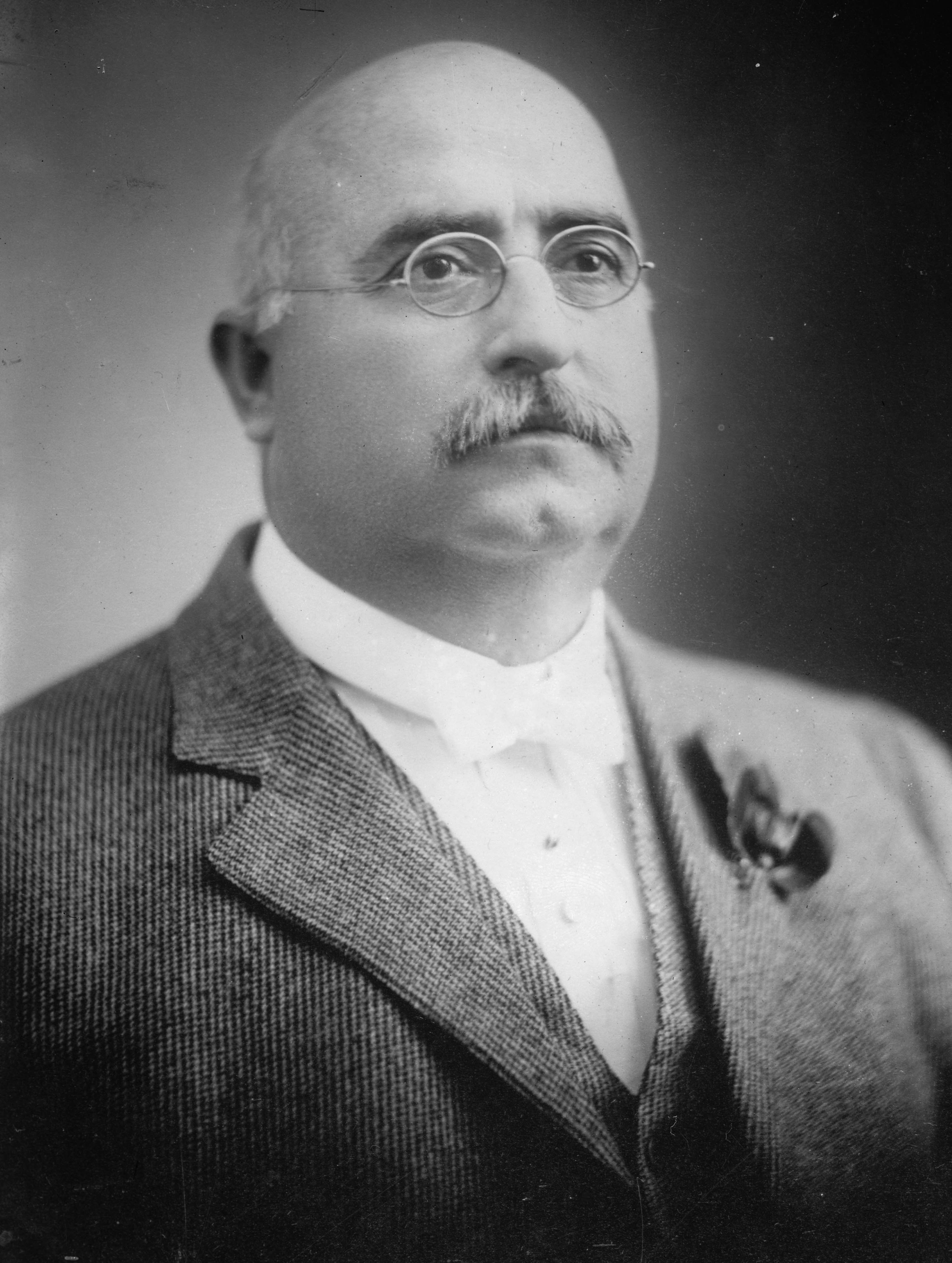

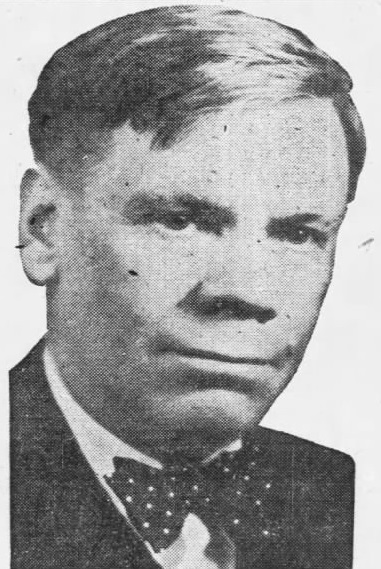
| Nominee | George W. P. Hunt | John Calhoun Phillips |
| Party | Democratic | Republican |
| Popular vote | 48,875 | 46,231 |
| Percentage | 51.39% | 48.61% |
- County results Hunt: 50–60% 60–70% Phillips: 50–60%
Governor before election
John Calhoun Phillips
Republican
Elected Governor
George W. P. Hunt
Democratic

The 1930 Arizona gubernatorial election took place on November 4, 1930. George W. P. Hunt narrowly won the general election in 1930, defeating incumbent governor John Calhoun Phillips, who had defeated Hunt in his bid for reelection in the previous election year in 1928.

George W. P. Hunt was sworn in for his seventh, and final, term as governor on January 5, 1931. Although Hunt would run again, this was the last time he won his party's nomination.

== Democratic primary ==
The Democratic primary took place on September 9, 1930. George W. P. Hunt was opposed in the primary by associate justice to the Arizona Supreme Court Frank H. Lyman and Andrew Jackson Bettwy, who was then serving as an Arizona state senator, as well as Fred Cotter. Bettwy would go on to run again for the nomination in four future cycles and would be the nominee of the Arizona Progressive Democrat party in the 1932 general election. Hunt won his party's nomination for the final time in 1930, winning 48.39% of the vote.

=== Candidates ===
- George W. P. Hunt, former governor, former ambassador to Siam
- Andrew Jackson Bettwy, Arizona state senator
- Frank H. Lyman, Arizona Supreme Court associate justice
- Fred C. Cotter

=== Results ===
Democratic primary results
| Party | Candidate | Votes | % |
|---|---|---|---|
| Democratic | George W. P. Hunt | 27,886 | 48.39% |
| Democratic | Frank H. Lyman | 20,085 | 34.85% |
| Democratic | Andrew Jackson Bettwy | 6,895 | 11.97% |
| Democratic | Fred C. Cotter | 2,760 | 4.79% |
| Total votes | | 57,626 | 100.00% |

== General election ==
Arizona gubernatorial election, 1930
| Party | Candidate | Votes | % | ±% |
|---|---|---|---|---|
| Democratic | George W. P. Hunt | 48,875 | 51.39% | +3.23% |
| Republican | John Calhoun Phillips (incumbent) | 46,231 | 48.61% | −3.09% |
| Majority | | 2,664 | 2.78% | |
| Total votes | | 95,106 | 100.00% | |
| Democratic gain from Republican | | Swing | +6.32% | |

=== Results by county ===
| County | George W. P. Hunt Democratic | | John C. Phillips Republican | | Margin | | Total votes cast |
| County | # | % | # | % | # | % | Total votes cast |
|---|---|---|---|---|---|---|---|
| Apache | 1,139 | 64.06% | 639 | 35.94% | 500 | 28.12% | 1,778 |
| Cochise | 5,044 | 50.18% | 5,007 | 49.82% | 37 | 0.37% | 10,051 |
| Coconino | 1,712 | 54.59% | 1,424 | 45.41% | 288 | 9.18% | 3,136 |
| Gila | 4,518 | 65.03% | 2,430 | 34.97% | 2,088 | 30.05% | 6,948 |
| Graham | 1,758 | 56.55% | 1,351 | 43.45% | 407 | 13.09% | 3,109 |
| Greenlee | 1,052 | 54.93% | 863 | 45.07% | 189 | 9.87% | 1,915 |
| Maricopa | 16,455 | 48.31% | 17,603 | 51.69% | -1,148 | -3.37% | 34,058 |
| Mohave | 1,288 | 64.89% | 697 | 35.11% | 591 | 29.77% | 1,985 |
| Navajo | 1,941 | 60.43% | 1,271 | 39.57% | 670 | 20.86% | 3,212 |
| Pima | 5,812 | 47.46% | 6,435 | 52.54% | -623 | -5.09% | 12,247 |
| Pinal | 1,792 | 53.48% | 1,559 | 46.52% | 233 | 6.95% | 3,351 |
| Santa Cruz | 907 | 49.81% | 914 | 50.19% | -7 | -0.38% | 1,821 |
| Yavapai | 3,510 | 47.84% | 3,827 | 52.16% | -317 | -4.32% | 7,337 |
| Yuma | 1,947 | 46.83% | 2,211 | 53.17% | -264 | -6.35% | 4,158 |
| Totals | 48,875 | 51.39% | 46,231 | 48.61% | 2,644 | 2.78% | 95,106 |

==== Counties that flipped from Republican to Democratic ====
- Cochise
- Mohave

==== Counties that flipped from Democratic to Republican ====
- Santa Cruz
- Yuma

== Bibliography ==
- Goff, John S. (1973). George The Fifth and Bibliographical and Biographical Notes (ed.). George W. P. Hunt and his Arizona. Phoenix: Socio-Technical Publications. pp. 159, 171–177, 273–277.
