= 1920 Arizona gubernatorial election =

- November 2, 1920
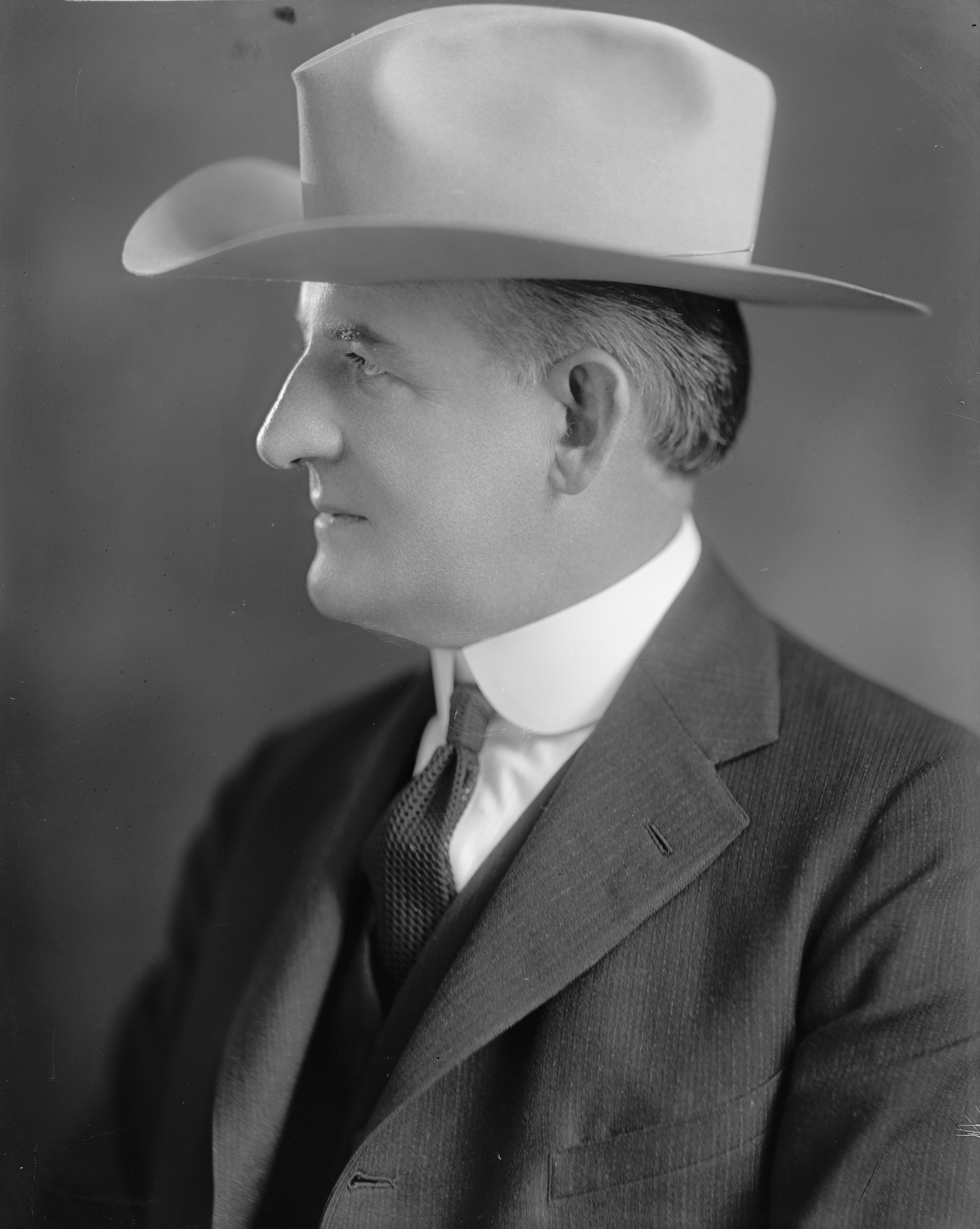

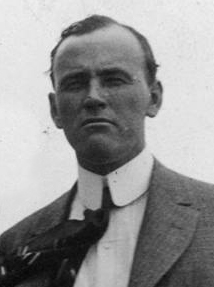
Nominee	Thomas E. Campbell	Mit Simms
Party	Republican	Democratic
Popular vote	37,060	31,385
Percentage	54.15%	45.85%
- County results Campbell: 50–60% 60–70% Simms: 50–60% 60–70%
Governor before election
Thomas E. Campbell
Republican
Elected Governor
Thomas E. Campbell
Republican

The 1920 Arizona gubernatorial election took place on November 2, 1920, for the post of governor of Arizona. Thomas Campbell won a second term in office, winning a full majority of the popular vote for the first time in three consecutive elections. He beat the sole challenger, Secretary of State Mit Simms. This would be the last office Campbell would win, while Sims would return in the 1930s to win several terms in his old offices of Treasurer and Secretary of State

Thomas Campbell was sworn in for his second term on January 3, 1921.

== General election ==
=== Results ===
Arizona gubernatorial election, 1920
Party	Candidate	Votes	%	±%
Republican	Thomas E. Campbell (incumbent)	37,060	54.15%	+4.25%
Democratic	Mit Simms	31,385	45.85%	−3.40%
Majority		5,675	8.29%	
Total votes		68,445	100.00%	
Republican hold		Swing	+7.64%	

=== Results by county ===
County	Thomas E. Campbell Republican		Mit Simms Democratic		Margin		Total votes cast
County	#	%	#	%	#	%	Total votes cast
Apache	728	55.24%	590	44.76%	138	10.47%	1,318
Cochise	5,440	54.88%	4,473	45.12%	967	9.75%	9,913
Coconino	1,315	59.69%	888	40.31%	427	19.38%	2,203
Gila	2,855	44.55%	3,553	55.45%	-698	-10.89%	6,408
Graham	1,394	53.62%	1,206	46.38%	188	7.23%	2,600
Greenlee	827	38.74%	1,308	61.26%	-481	-22.53%	2,135
Maricopa	11,273	54.88%	9,268	45.12%	2,005	9.76%	20,541
Mohave	890	49.92%	893	50.08%	-3	-0.17%	1,783
Navajo	1,081	50.80%	1,047	49.20%	34	1.60%	2,128
Pima	3,556	59.81%	2,389	40.19%	1,167	19.63%	5,945
Pinal	1,491	53.06%	1,319	46.94%	172	6.12%	2,810
Santa Cruz	907	56.16%	708	43.84%	199	12.32%	1,615
Yavapai	3,702	60.20%	2,448	39.80%	1,254	20.39%	6,150
Yuma	1,601	55.28%	1,295	44.72%	306	10.57%	2,896
Totals	37,060	54.15%	31,358	45.85%	5,675	8.29%	68,445

==== Counties that flipped from Democratic to Republican ====
- Apache
- Cochise
- Graham
- Navajo
- Santa Cruz
- Yuma
