= John Calhoun Phillips =

American politician (1870–1943)

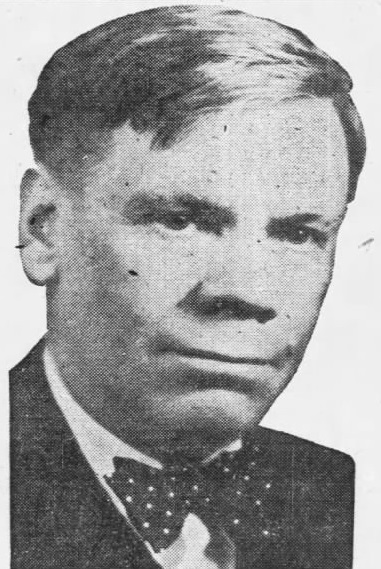
- From 1930 campaign ad published in the Arizona Republic

3rd Governor of Arizona
- In office January 7, 1929 – January 5, 1931
- Preceded by: George W. P. Hunt
- Succeeded by: George W. P. Hunt

Member of the Arizona Senate
- In office 1922–1924

Member of the Arizona House of Representatives
- In office 1916–1922

Personal details
- Born: November 13, 1870 Vermont, Illinois, U.S.
- Died: June 25, 1943 (aged 72) Flagstaff, Arizona, U.S.
- Party: Republican
- Spouse: Minne Rexroat

John Calhoun Phillips (November 13, 1870 – June 25, 1943) was an American politician who served as the third governor of the state of Arizona from January 7, 1929, to January 5, 1931.

Born in 1870 in Vermont, Illinois, Phillips graduated from Hedding College in 1893 and passed the bar in Illinois. He moved to Arizona in 1898 where he practiced private law while at the same time working as a construction worker to earn a living. He helped to build the state capitol building that he would later occupy as governor. He served as a probate judge from 1902 to 1912 before being elected to the Arizona House of Representatives and later, the Arizona Senate.

Phillips became governor in 1929 during the Great Depression. He was instrumental in the creation of a free county library system, the Colorado River Commission, the State Bureau of Criminal Identification and the Arizona Game and Fish Department. During his governorship, he refused to raise the salary for the state judges for political reasons.

Considered an unattractive man with a sense of humor, Phillips referred to himself as "the ugliest man in Arizona." Phillips died in 1943 from a heart attack while fishing on Lake Mary near Flagstaff, Arizona. He was entombed at Greenwood/Memory Lawn Mortuary & Cemetery in Phoenix.

== Sources ==
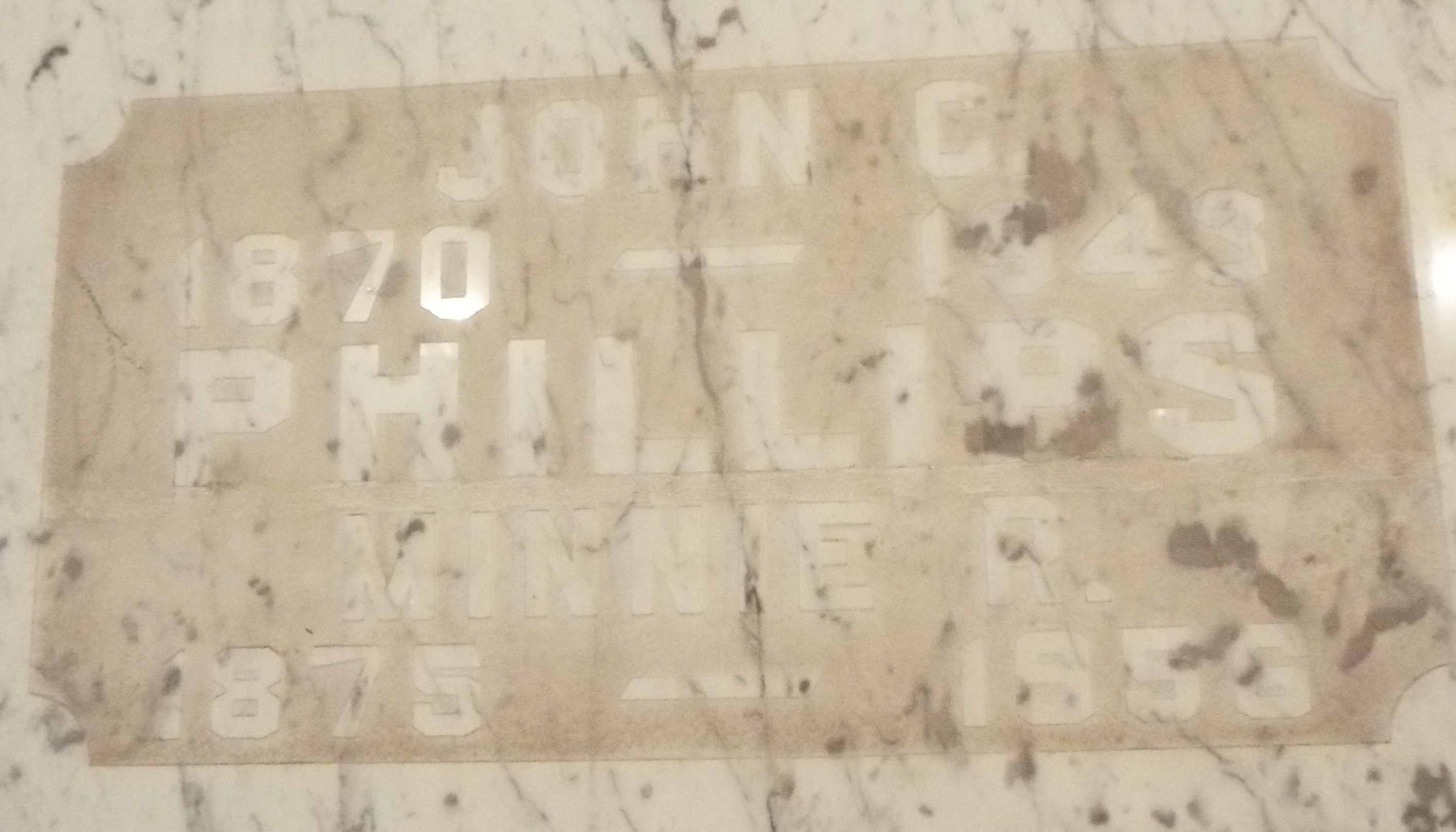
The crypt of John Calhoun Phillips (1870–1943) and his wife Minnie Phillips (1875–1956).

- "Arizona Governor John C. Phillips". Former Governors' Bios. National Governors Association. May 3, 2002.
- Sobel, Robert, and John Raimo, eds. Biographical Directory of the Governors of the United States, 1789–1978, Vol. 1, Westport, Conn.; Meckler Books, 1978. 4 vols.
- Goff, John F. Arizona Biographical Dictionary. Black Mountain Press. Cave Creek, Arizona 1983. p. 263

Party political offices
Preceded by Elias S. Clark	Republican nominee for Governor of Arizona; 1928, 1930	Succeeded by Jack Kinney
Political offices
Preceded by George W. P. Hunt	Governor of Arizona; 1929–1931	Succeeded by George W. P. Hunt
