= 1916 Arizona gubernatorial election =

- November 7, 1916
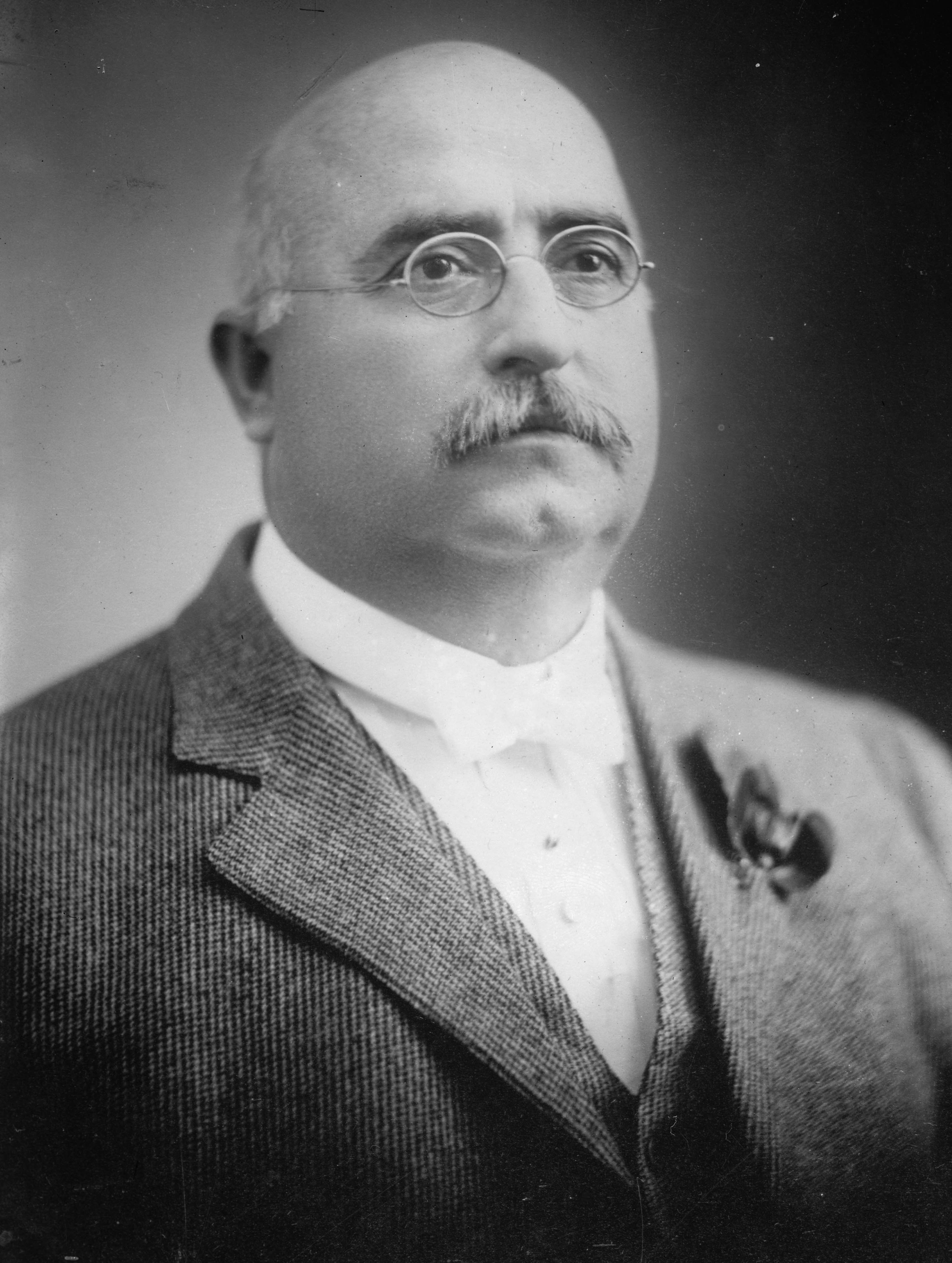

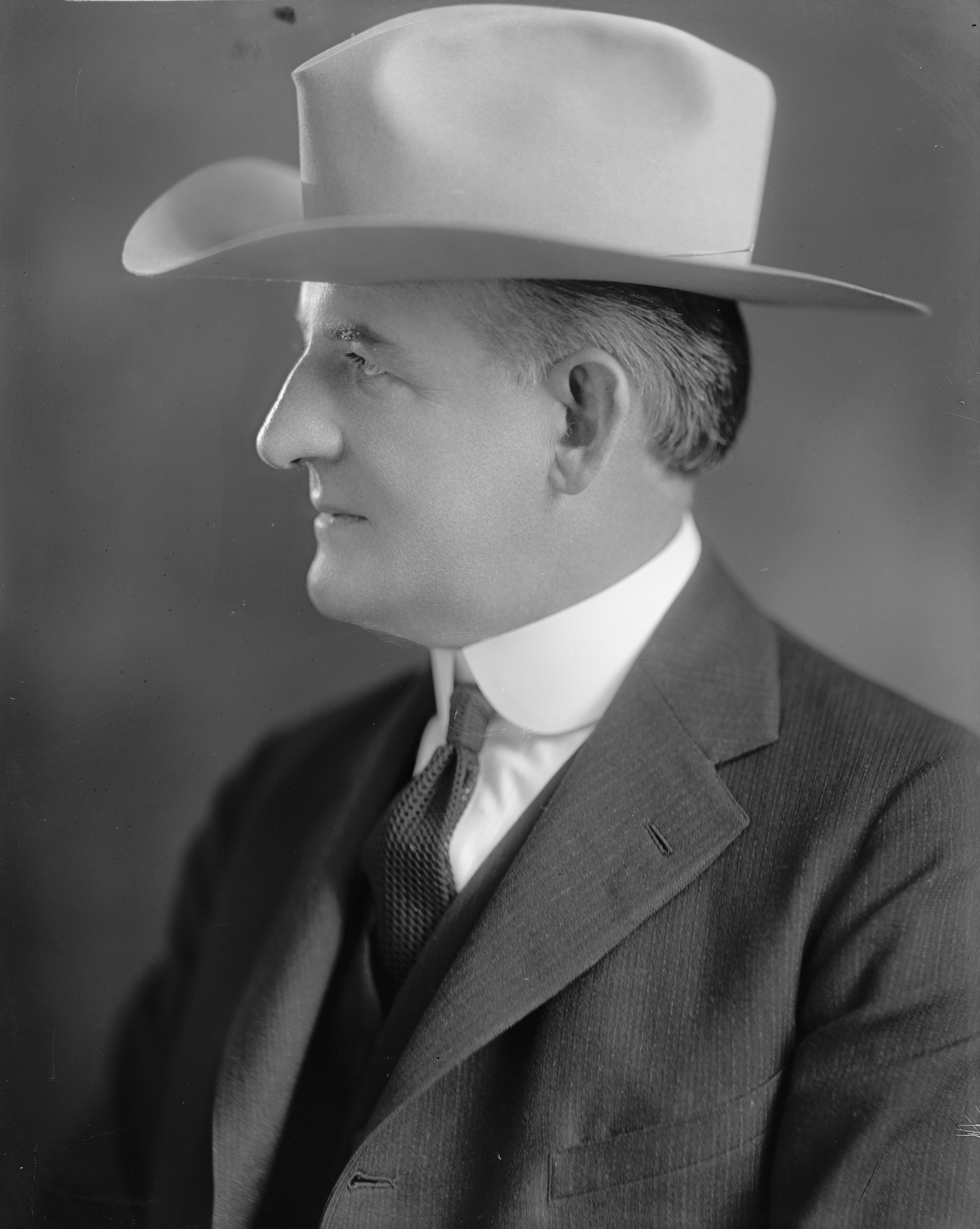
Nominee	George W. P. Hunt	Thomas E. Campbell
Party	Democratic	Republican
Original count	27,946; 47.94%	27,976; 47.99%
Court recount	28,094; 48.01%	28,051; 47.94%
- Original count results by county Campbell: 40–50% 50–60% Hunt: 40–50% 50–60% 60–70%
Governor before election
George W. P. Hunt
Democratic
Elected Governor
Thomas E. Campbell (until recount)
Republican

The 1916 Arizona gubernatorial election took place on November 7, 1916, for the post of governor of Arizona. Due to battles between labor and business, the Hunt administration was facing severe electoral backlash. After facing a fairly strong primary by former council member George Olney, Hunt prevailed and went on to face the closest election in Arizona gubernatorial history. The initial results of the 1916 election were extremely close, with Campbell winning by only 30 votes.

Victory hinged on whether to count certain votes. Arizona then had a ballot where voters could check a party column ballot signifying they voted for all of a party. Some voters did that for the Democratic Party column, but then also checked for Republican challenger Thomas Campbell, leading to a court battle over the interpretation of whether those votes were valid. All ballots that were marked as straight Democrat and Hunt, were originally counted for Campbell, giving him the 30 vote majority.

Thomas E. Campbell was sworn in as governor on January 1, 1917, but Hunt refused to leave office. The state Supreme Court ruled that Campbell should serve as the de facto governor until the legal issues were resolved, so Hunt stepped down on the 27th. After losing a case in the Maricopa County Superior Court in May, Hunt appealed to the state Supreme Court. On December 22, the court declared that Hunt had won by 43 votes. Hunt took office again on Christmas of 1917, after the court ruled unanimously in his favor. Campbell served nearly an entire year as governor. This would be the last election in which Hunt would run until 1922.

== Democratic primary ==
=== Candidates ===
- George W. P. Hunt, incumbent governor
- George A. Olney, former Arizona Territorial Council member

=== Results ===
Democratic primary results
Party	Candidate	Votes	%
Democratic	George W. P. Hunt (incumbent)	18,122	59.65%
Democratic	George A. Olney	12,261	40.35%
Total votes		30,383	100.00

== General election ==
=== Results ===
Arizona gubernatorial election, 1916 (original returns)
Party	Candidate	Votes	%	±%
Republican	Thomas E. Campbell	27,976	47.99%	+13.48%
Democratic	George W. P. Hunt (incumbent)	27,946	47.94%	−1.52%
Socialist	Peter T. Robinson	1,975	3.39%	−2.44%
Prohibition	Robert E. Dunlap	396	0.68%	+0.68%
Majority		30	0.05%	
Total votes		58,293	100.00%	
Republican gain from Democratic		Swing	+15.00%	

Arizona gubernatorial election, 1916 (court recount, 1917)
Party	Candidate	Votes	%	±%
Democratic	George W. P. Hunt (incumbent)	28,094	48.01%	−1.45%
Republican	Thomas E. Campbell	28,051	47.94%	+13.43%
Socialist	Peter T. Robinson	1,975	3.38%	−2.45%
Prohibition	Robert E. Dunlap	396	0.68%	+0.68%
Majority		43	0.07%	
Turnout		58,516	100.00%	
Democratic gain from Republican		Swing	-14.87%	

=== Results by county ===
County (Note: The county results are based on the original canvass.)	George W. P. Hunt Democratic		Thomas E. Campbell Republican		Peter T. Robinson Socialist		Robert E. Dunlap Prohibition		Margin		Total votes cast
County	#	%	#	%	#	%	#	%	#	%	Total votes cast
Apache	566	54.06%	471	44.99%	10	0.96%	0	0.00%	95	9.07%	1,047
Cochise	5,274	52.22%	4,433	43.90%	392	3.88%	0	0.00%	841	8.33%	10,099
Coconino	1,041	47.32%	1,105	50.23%	54	2.45%	0	0.00%	-64	-2.91%	2,200
Gila	3,681	62.70%	1,923	32.75%	267	4.55%	0	0.00%	1,758	29.94%	5,871
Graham	1,013	43.70%	1,212	52.29%	93	4.01%	0	0.00%	-199	-8.58%	2,318
Greenlee	1,371	57.70%	968	40.74%	34	1.43%	3	0.13%	403	16.96%	2,376
Maricopa	5,087	35.18%	8,549	59.12%	482	3.33%	342	2.37%	-3,462	-23.94%	14,460
Mohave	1,379	61.21%	711	31.56%	163	7.23%	0	0.00%	668	29.65%	2,253
Navajo	870	46.65%	952	51.05%	20	1.07%	23	1.23%	-82	-4.40%	1,865
Pima	2,233	45.79%	2,561	52.51%	83	1.70%	0	0.00%	-328	-6.73%	4,877
Pinal	1,059	47.53%	1,111	49.87%	39	1.75%	19	0.85%	-52	-2.33%	2,228
Santa Cruz	715	49.31%	704	48.55%	24	1.66%	7	0.48%	11	0.76%	1,450
Yavapai	2,385	47.85%	2,435	48.86%	162	3.25%	2	0.04%	-50	-1.00%	4,984
Yuma	1,272	56.16%	841	37.13%	152	6.71%	0	0.00%	431	19.03%	2,265
Totals	27,946	47.94%	27,976	47.99%	1,975	3.39%	396	0.68%	-30	-0.05%	58,293

==== Counties that flipped from Democratic to Republican ====
- Coconino
- Graham
- Maricopa
- Navajo
- Pinal
- Yavapai

== Bibliography ==
- Goff, John S. (1973). "Troubles of a Governor and Federal Labor Conciliator". George W. P. Hunt and his Arizona. Phoenix: Socio-Technical Publications. p. 96.
