= Benjamin Baker Moeur =

American politician (1869–1937)

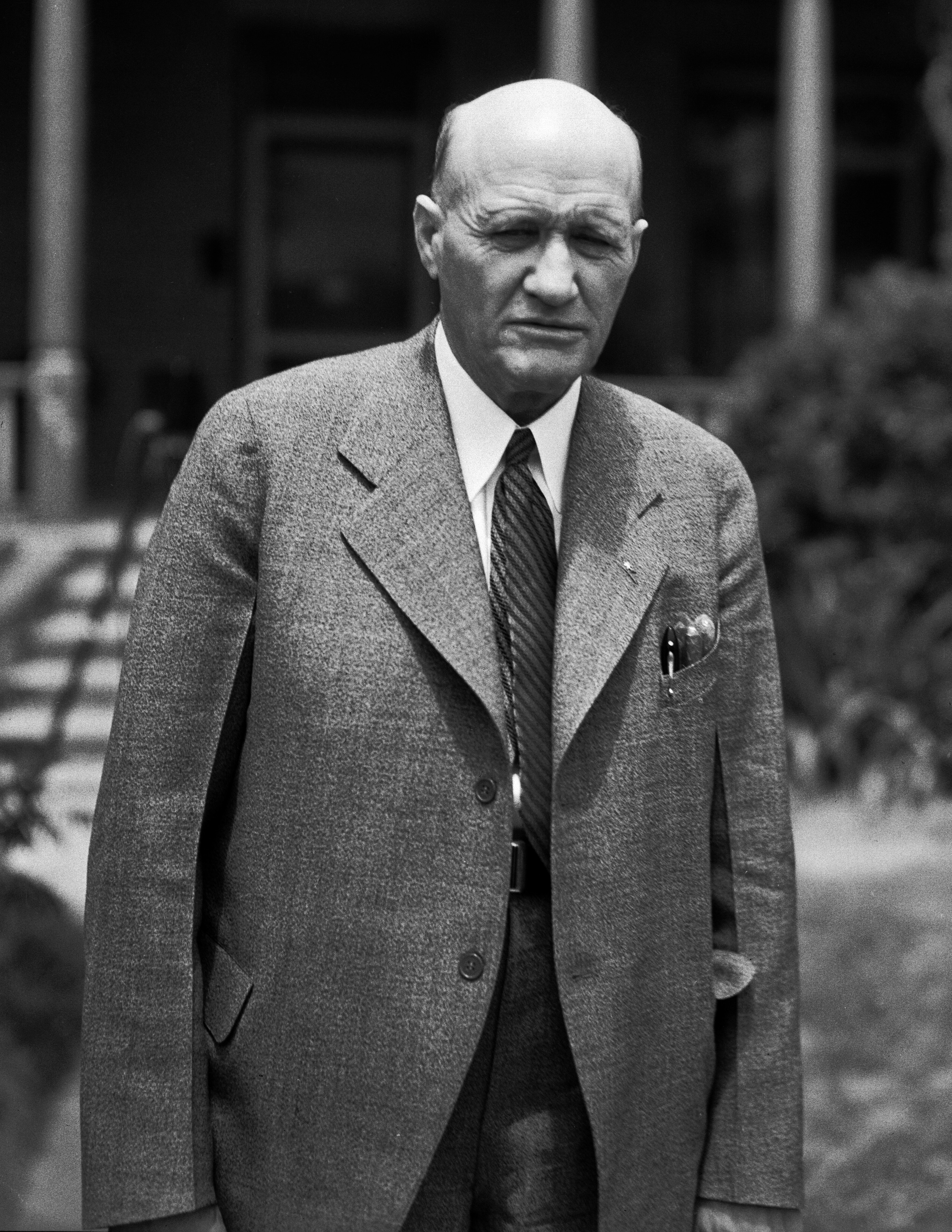
- Moeur in 1934

4th Governor of Arizona
- In office January 2, 1933 – January 4, 1937
- Preceded by: George W. P. Hunt
- Succeeded by: Rawghlie C. Stanford

Personal details
- Born: December 22, 1869 Decherd, Tennessee, U.S.
- Died: March 16, 1937 (aged 67) Tempe, Arizona, U.S.
- Party: Democratic
- Spouse: Honor G. Anderson (m.1876)
- Children: 4
- Profession: Physician

Benjamin Baker Moeur (December 22, 1869 – March 16, 1937) was an American physician who served as the fourth governor of Arizona.

== Biography ==
Born in Decherd, Tennessee, Moeur attended medical school in Little Rock, Arkansas. After graduating in 1896, Moeur moved to Tempe, Arizona and started a medical practice. He was a representative for Maricopa County at the State of Arizona Constitution Convention in 1910. He also served on the Tempe School Board and served as the Secretary of the Board of Education for Arizona State Teacher's College (the precursor to Arizona State University) in Tempe.

During Moeur's governorship, a number of progressive reforms in areas such as working conditions and social security were carried out. He also mobilized the Arizona National Guard to stop the construction on Parker Dam, which was being built primarily to divert more water to the Los Angeles area. The mobilization was partly an embarrassment, as the troops arrived via an antiquated steamboat, which became stranded. Its troops were rescued by workers from California working at the dam. Moeur's primary motive, however, was later vindicated by the United States Supreme Court when it ruled that California and the Bureau of Reclamation were constructing Parker Dam illegally because the dam had never been properly authorized. Subsequent legislation rectified this error and construction continued apace.

Governor Moeur served two terms (1933–1937) and died 71 days after he left office. He died in Tempe, where he is buried at the Double Butte Cemetery.

== Personal life ==
Moeur married Honor G. Anderson in 1896. His wife was the sister of Guess Eleanor Birchett who was known as "the Bird Lady of Tempe".

== Legacy ==
In 1939, as a WPA project, Tempe Normal School (later known as Arizona State University) constructed the B. B. Moeur Activity Building on the main Tempe campus. The building was originally the women's activity center, later being remodeled and used as the university's admissions office. The building now houses the Mars Space Flight Facility, a NASA-funded research center directed by Dr. Phil Christensen.

Dr. Moeur has been honored since 1901 by the now Arizona State University via the Moeur Award. The Moeur Award is given to the student or students with the highest academic standing in terms of GPA, and is thus also considered the equivalent to a Valedictorian Award (which is not directly offered by Arizona State).

== Gallery ==
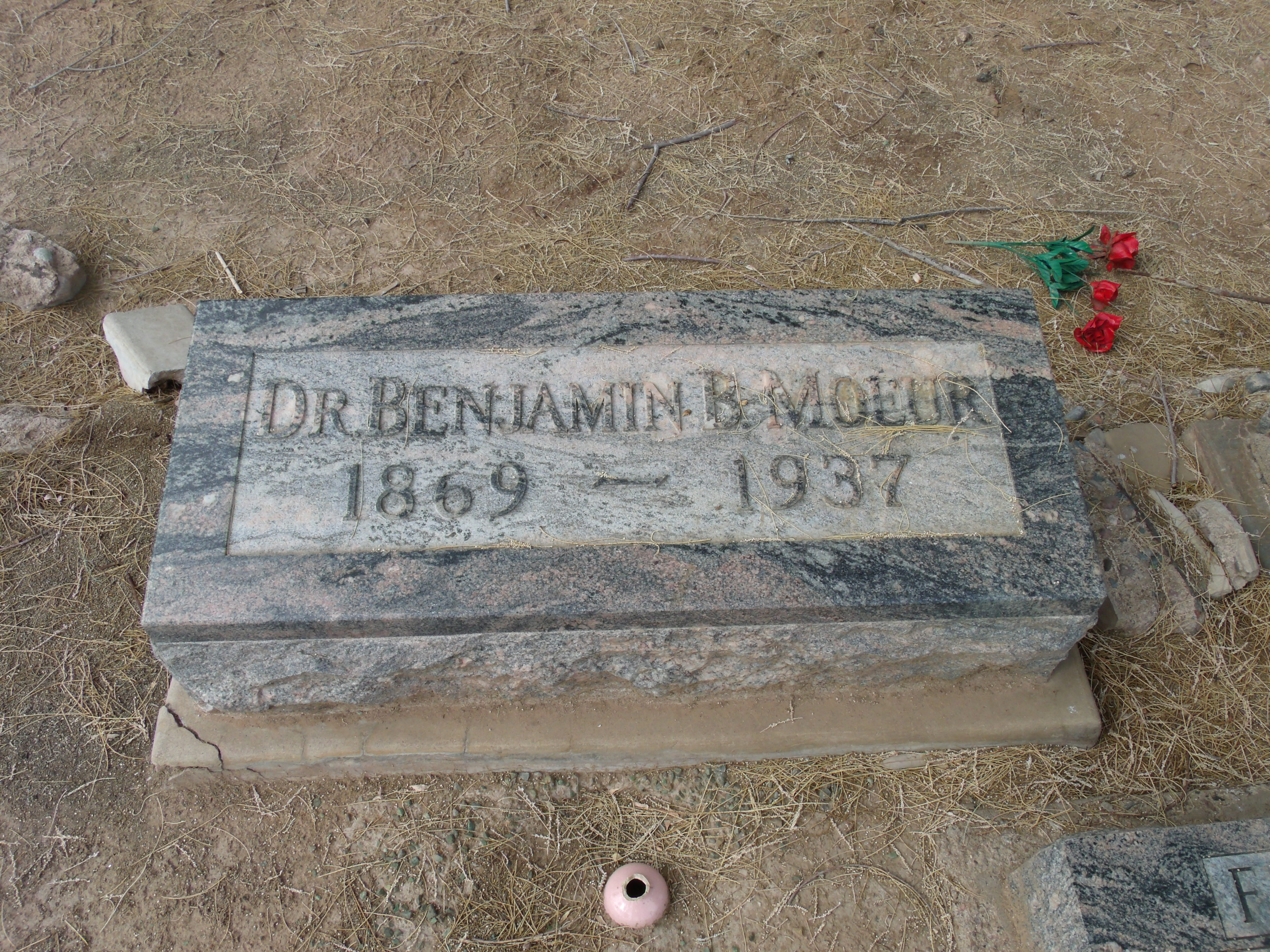
The grave site of Benjamin B. Moeur ; Sec. 04–283 in Double Butte Cemetery

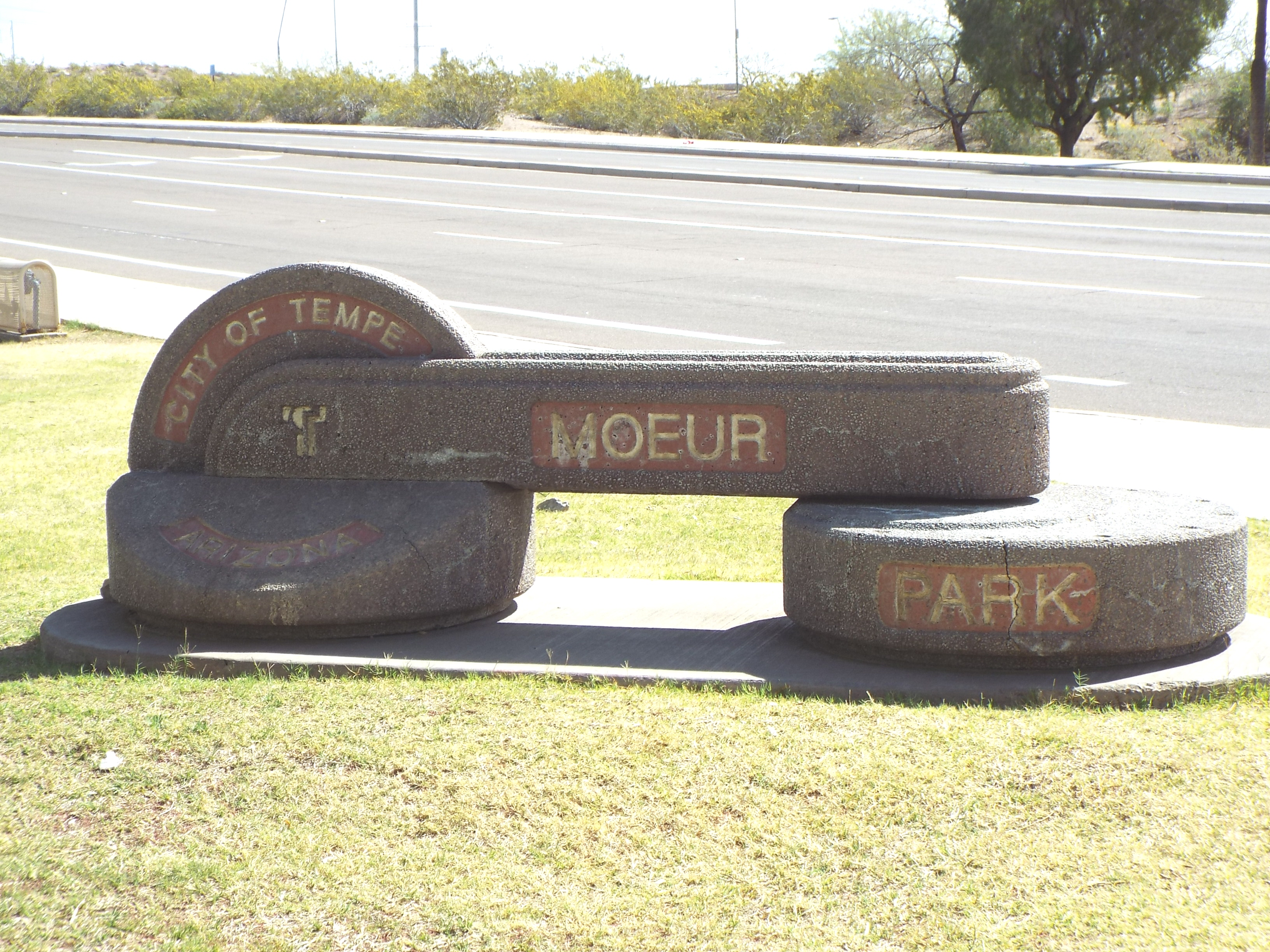
Entrance to Moeur Park which was established in 1933 and is located on Mill Ave

Party political offices
Preceded by George W. P. Hunt	Democratic nominee for Governor of Arizona; 1932, 1934	Succeeded by Rawghlie Clement Stanford
Political offices
Preceded by George W. P. Hunt	Governor of Arizona; 1933–1937	Succeeded by Rawghlie Stanford
