= George W. P. Hunt =

American politician (1859–1934)

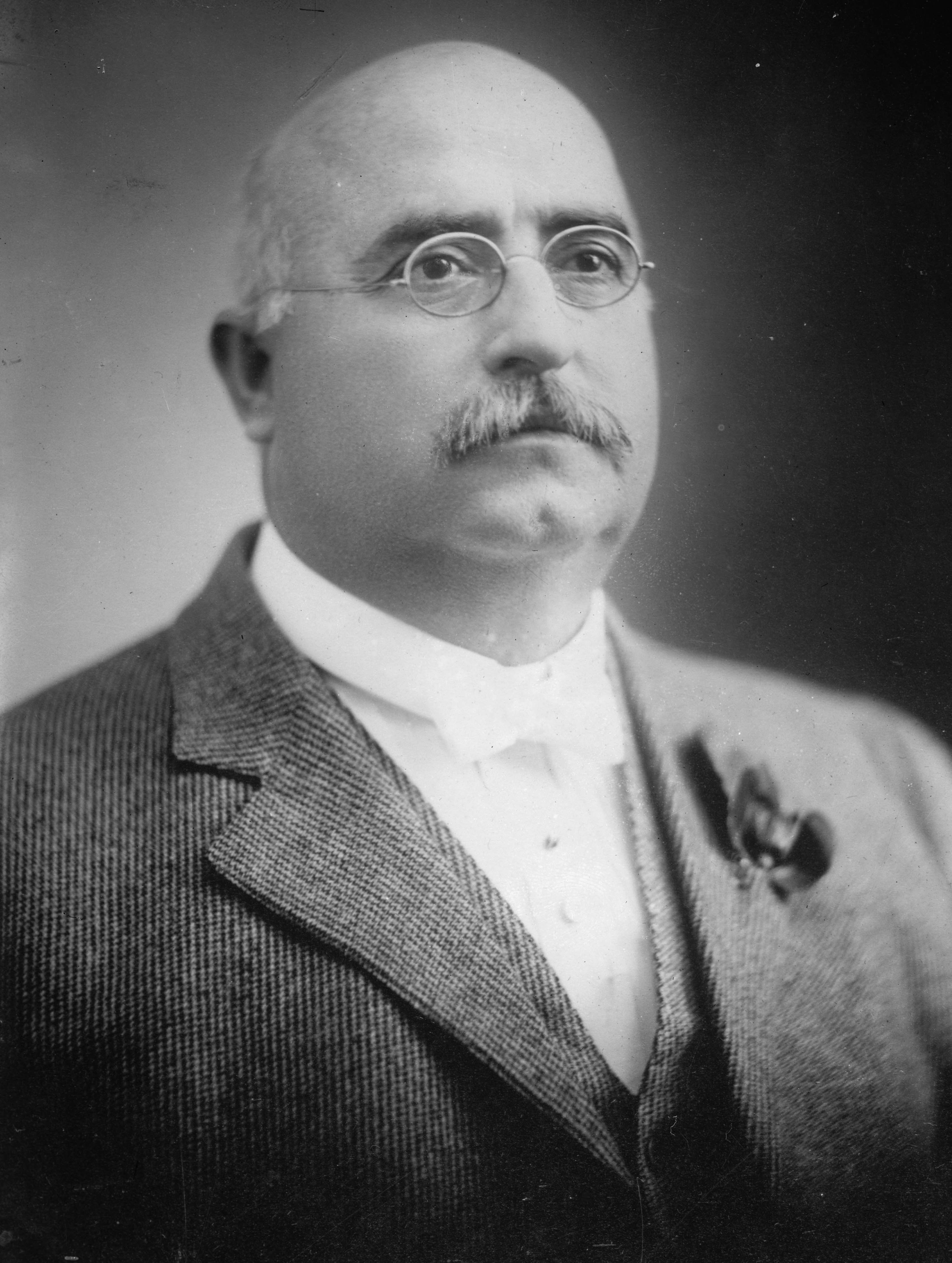

1st Governor of Arizona
- In office January 5, 1931 – January 2, 1933
- Preceded by: John C. Phillips
- Succeeded by: Benjamin Baker Moeur
- In office January 1, 1923 – January 7, 1929
- Preceded by: Thomas E. Campbell
- Succeeded by: John C. Phillips
- In office December 25, 1917 – January 6, 1919
- Preceded by: Thomas E. Campbell (Disputed)
- Succeeded by: Thomas E. Campbell
- In office February 14, 1912 – January 1, 1917
- Preceded by: Richard Elihu Sloan (Territorial governor)
- Succeeded by: Thomas E. Campbell (Disputed)

United States Minister to Siam
- In office May 18, 1920 – October 4, 1921
- President: Woodrow Wilson
- Preceded by: George Pratt Ingersoll
- Succeeded by: Edward E. Brodie

Personal details
- Born: George Wylie Paul Hunt; November 1, 1859 Huntsville, Missouri, US
- Died: December 24, 1934 (aged 75) Phoenix, Arizona, US
- Resting place: Papago Park, Phoenix, Arizona
- Party: Democratic
- Spouse: Helen Ellison
- Children: 1
- Profession: Businessman, politician, ambassador

George Wylie Paul Hunt (Note: Hunt's two middle names are uncertain. His second name is alternatively given as Wiley, Willie, Wyley, and Wylley while some family members used the name Pearle instead of Paul for his third name.) (November 1, 1859 – December 24, 1934) was an American politician and businessman. He was the first governor of Arizona, serving a total of seven terms, along with President of the convention that wrote Arizona's constitution. In addition, Hunt served in both houses of the Arizona Territorial Legislature and was posted as U.S. Minister to Siam by Woodrow Wilson.

Calling himself the "Old Walrus", Hunt was 5 feet 9 inches (1.75 m) tall, close to 300 pounds (140 kg), bald, and had a drooping handlebar moustache. Politically, he took on aspects from the populist, and later progressive, movements who supported reforms such as women's suffrage, secret ballots, income tax, free silver coinage, and compulsory education. Hunt was also an opponent of capital punishment and a supporter of organized labor.

== Background ==
Hunt was born in Huntsville, Missouri, to George Washington and Sarah Elizabeth (Yates) Hunt on November 1, 1859. His family was originally well-to-do, with the town of Huntsville having been named for Hunt's grandfather, but lost its fortune as a result of the American Civil War. After being educated in a combination of public and private schools, Hunt ran away from his family on March 3, 1878. For three years, his family believed he had been killed by Indians while Hunt traveled through Kansas, Colorado and rafted down the Rio Grande.

Hunt arrived in Globe, Arizona, his home for the rest of his life, with two burros and needing a job. His first job was as a waiter in the Pasco Café. This was followed by a series of odd jobs, including a mucker in a mine and work on a cattle ranch, before he became a clerk at a general store. Early experience in the grocery department led Hunt to perform most of his household's shopping. The store was purchased by a larger concern, the Old Dominion Commercial Company, and Hunt advanced to become president of the combined business. Following his election as governor, he sold his company stock and limited his investments to government bonds.

Hunt married Helen Duett Ellison in Holbrook, Arizona, on February 24, 1904. The couple had a single daughter, named Virginia. Hunt's personal interests included cultivation of rare shrubs and trees along with collection of Southwestern Indian art. He was a Freemason and an Oddfellow.

== Arizona Territory ==
Hunt's first foray into politics was an unsuccessful 1890 run for county recorder of Gila County. This was followed by successful runs for the Territorial House of Representatives in 1892 and 1894. During his first term as a Representative, Hunt sponsored legislation authorizing a US$5,000 reward for capture of the Apache Kid.

After two terms in the lower house Hunt successfully ran for a seat in the upper house, the council, in 1896. During the 1897 legislative session, he sponsored legislation requiring children between eight and fourteen years of age attend school for a minimum of twelve weeks per year. Hunt was reelected to the Council in 1898 before voluntarily leaving politics until 1904. Upon reentering politics, he was again elected to the council in 1904, 1906, and 1908. During the 23rd Arizona Territorial Legislature, Hunt was President of the council but was unable to secure passage of his bill providing primary elections to nominate political candidates. During the 1907 legislative session he secured passage of a bill outlawing gambling within the territory. During his final legislative session, Hunt once again served as President of the council and won passage of his bill creating nominating primaries.

Following passage of Arizona's Enabling Act, an election was called to select delegates to a constitutional convention. Hunt won election as one of five delegates from Gila County. On the first day of the convention, Hunt was in turn selected as president for the convention. The last surviving member of the convention, Jacob Weinberger, later recalled Hunt as a "behind-the-scenes manipulator who presided in the manner of a stoic, benign Buddha– if one can picture Buddha with a splendid handlebar mustache." Among the features of the new constitution that he supported were initiative, recall, and referendum.

Hunt announced his candidacy for governor of the new state in September 1911. Following victory in the Democratic primary, he went on to a narrow victory over Republican challenger Edmund W. Wells to be elected first Governor of Arizona.

== First terms ==
Hunt was sworn in as Arizona's first state governor on February 14, 1912. When the new legislature met in March of the same year, he lobbied for passage of legislation restricting child labor, lobbying, and usury. Other legislation supported by Hunt included requirements for newspapers to disclose their ownership, creation of workers' compensation, and creating old age pensions. During his first term as governor, several labor laws were introduced.

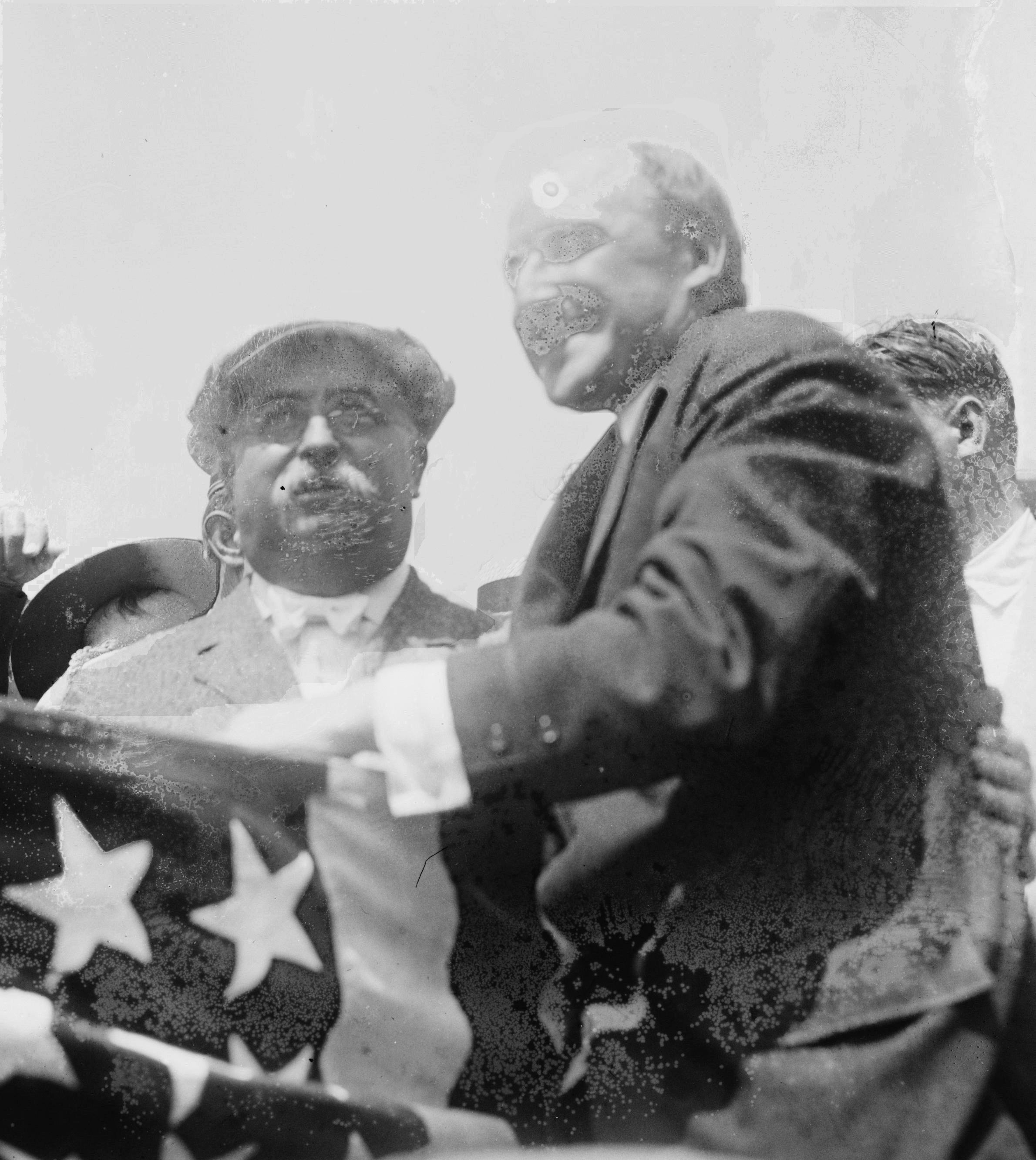
Governor Hunt (left) at the launch of the USS Arizona (BB-39)

Due to an Arizona Supreme Court ruling that there would be no elections for state officials in 1912, Hunt's first run for reelection did not occur until 1914. After defeating Ralph H. Cameron, the governor's second term was dominated by events along the United States–Mexico border. Conflict from the Mexican Revolution began affecting American interests by April 1914. This was followed by an October 11, 1914 attack on Naco, Arizona. Hunt considered deploying the Arizona National Guard to protect American lives, but was convinced by Secretary of War Lindley M. Garrison to allow U.S. Army troops to handle the conflict. Problems with cross border shootings continued with the American military unable to prevent the violence without crossing into Mexico.

The elections of 1916 resulted in a contested election result. Initial results showed that challenger Thomas E. Campbell had won by 30 votes, but Hunt challenged the results claiming that several precincts had experienced fraudulent voting. Hunt initially refused to leave office, but a January 27, 1917, ruling by the Arizona Supreme Court naming Campbell the de facto governor forced him to surrender his office. On December 30, 1916, shortly before leaving office, Hunt pardoned former sheriff's deputies Robert Fenter and Frank Moore, who had been convicted of second degree murder for lynching two Mexicans suspected of horse theft.

The former governor maintained his fights in the court, and on December 22, 1917, was declared the winner of the 1916 election by a total of 43 votes. Hunt returned to office for his third term on December 25, 1917.

With the United States' entry into World War I, Hunt began knitting scarves for soldiers as a patriotic duty and said he wished he could serve with the U.S. Marines. The governor's associations with the Industrial Workers of the World however caused his loyalties to be questioned. After a person from Flagstaff challenged his loyalties, Hunt filed a lawsuit claiming libel and was awarded one cent in damages.

== Minister to Siam ==
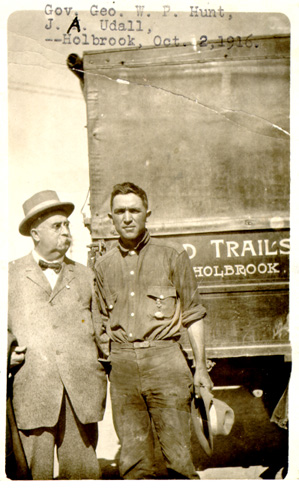
Hunt (left) with future Chief Justice of the Arizona Supreme Court, Jesse Addison Udall

In 1918, Hunt decided not to run for reelection and left office in January 1919. He soon became bored and began looking for new challenges. One such challenge was his attempt to learn how to drive an automobile. After driving into a ditch several times, he described the experience with: "One started out in the morning with exhilaration and by nightfall was towed home in shame."

By early 1920, Hunt was believed to be planning a run for Mark Smith's U.S. Senate seat. To counter this possible threat, it is rumored that Smith, with the help of Henry F. Ashurst, asked President Woodrow Wilson to appoint Hunt to a diplomatic position that would take him away from Arizona. The story continues with Wilson placing his finger on a globe and asking "Would this be far enough?" Hunt was confirmed as the U.S. Minister to Siam on May 18, 1920.

Hunt was replaced as Minister to Siam by President Warren G. Harding on October 4, 1921. While in Siam, Hunt had maintained contact with Arizona by sending postcards. The former governor also brought back a variety of souvenirs to hand out to his supporters. Upon his return, Hunt began speaking to various groups within Arizona about his experiences overseas. After a short time, the topic of these speeches changed to politics, and by mid-1922 Hunt was running for his fourth term as Governor of Arizona.

== 1920s ==
Beginning in 1923, Hunt served as Governor of Arizona for six consecutive years, winning closely contested reelection contests in both 1924 and 1926. Arizona's primary political issue during this time period was ratification of the Colorado River Compact. The governor opposed ratification of the compact, which appropriated water rights to the Colorado River among seven states, claiming that it gave California an unfair share of "Arizona's birthright". The issue was of such importance to Hunt that Arizonans of the day joked that while Jesus had walked on water, their governor ran on the Colorado River.

In addition to his stance on the Colorado River, Hunt's political longevity became a source of pointed comments. During his fifth term, Hunt's political opponents gave the governor the sobriquet "George V". This was updated to "George VI" after he won a sixth term. During a 1928 meeting at the Phoenix airport, Will Rogers picked up on the theme by asking Hunt to adopt the humorist so that he could succeed to his "hereditary governorship".

Unwilling to subject Arizona lawyers to "foreign" imposition of unlimited terms in their membership organization, Governor Hunt included a "sunset" provision in legislation creating a unified bar. The legislation unceremoniously expired in 1984 and is still the subject of legal controversy. Governor Hunt had been pressured to institute a uniform code by delegates visiting Arizona from the American Bar Association from Chicago.

== Later years ==
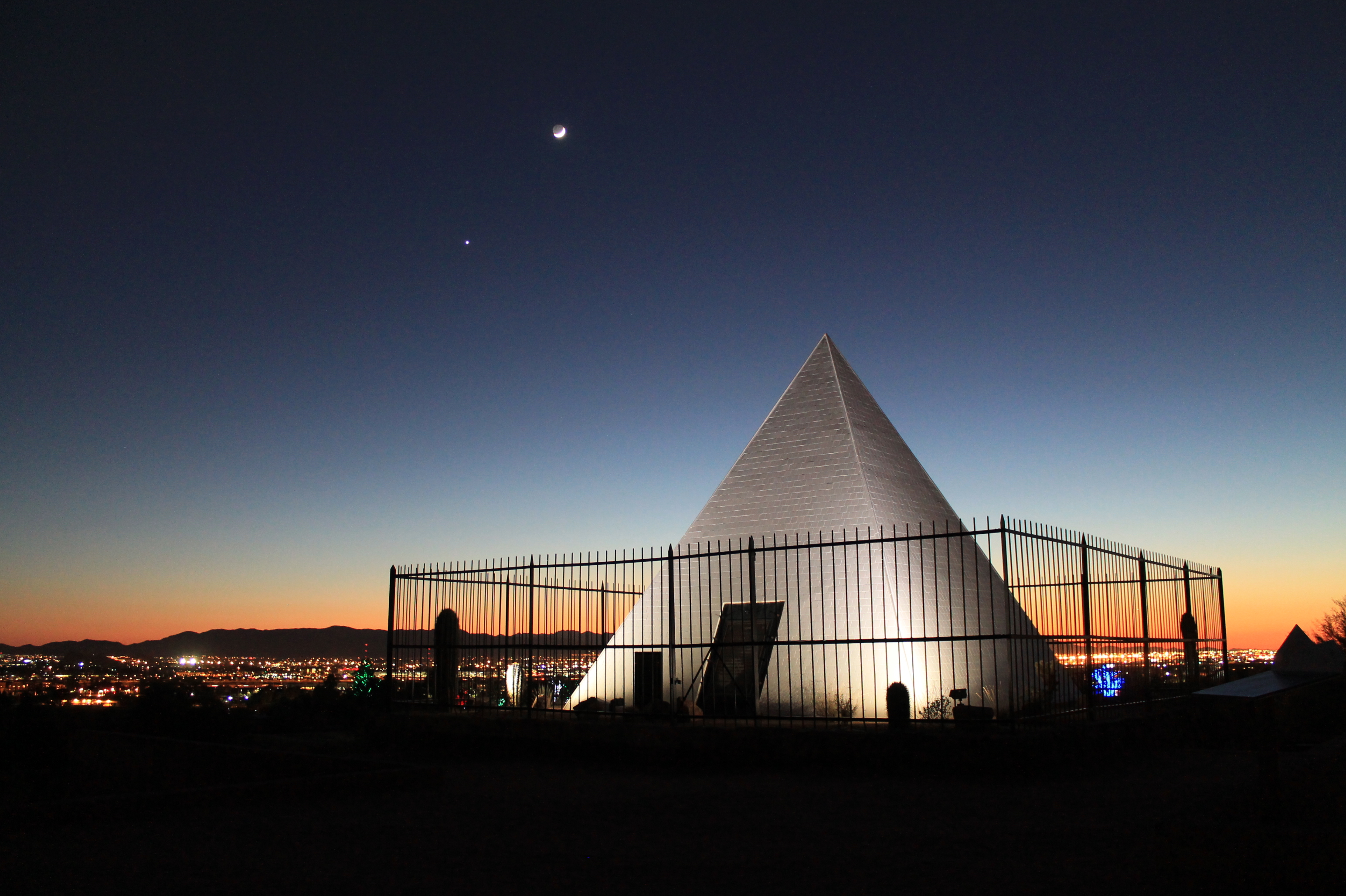
Hunt's Tomb in Phoenix's Papago Park

Hunt was defeated in his 1928 reelection bid, swept aside by that year's Republican landslide. His 1930 campaign was successful, and Hunt returned for a seventh term. His wife died April 18, 1931, their marriage lasting 27 years. Hunt failed to gain his party's nomination in 1932, losing to Benjamin Baker Moeur, and made another unsuccessful run in 1934. Hunt died of heart failure at home on December 24. 1934. He was interred in a white pyramid set atop a hill in Phoenix's Papago Park.

== Bibliography ==
- Goff, John S. (1989). "George W. P. Hunt". In Myers, John L. (ed.). The Arizona governors, 1912–1990. Phoenix: Heritage Publishers. pp. 7–17. ISBN 0-929690-05-2.
- Johnson, James W. (2002). Arizona Politicians: The Noble and the Notorious. illustrations by David 'Fitz' Fitzsimmons. University of Arizona Press. ISBN 0-8165-2203-0.
- Wagoner, Jay J. (1970). Arizona Territory 1863–1912: A Political history. Tucson: University of Arizona Press. ISBN 0-8165-0176-9.

Party political offices
First	Democratic nominee for Governor of Arizona; 1911, 1914, 1916	Succeeded by Fred T. Colter
Preceded by Mit Simms	Democratic nominee for Governor of Arizona; 1922, 1924, 1926, 1928, 1930	Succeeded by Benjamin Baker Moeur
Political offices
Preceded by Richard Elihu Sloan as Territorial Governor	Governor of Arizona; 1912–1917	Succeeded by Thomas Edward Campbell; Prior to court resolving disputed election
Preceded by Thomas Edward Campbell; Prior to court resolving disputed election	Governor of Arizona; 1917–1919	Succeeded by Thomas Edward Campbell
Preceded by Thomas Edward Campbell	Governor of Arizona; 1923–1929	Succeeded by John Calhoun Phillips
Preceded by John Calhoun Phillips	Governor of Arizona; 1931–1933	Succeeded by Benjamin Baker Moeur
