= United States presidential elections in Arizona =

Presidential elections in Arizona
- Number of elections: 29
- Voted Democratic: 9
- Voted Republican: 20
- Voted other: 0
- Voted for winning candidate: 23
- Voted for losing candidate: 6

Since Arizona's admission to the Union in February 1912, it has participated in 28 United States presidential elections.

Since the 1950s, Arizona has been considered a stronghold state for the Republican Party, with the party carrying the state in all subsequent elections except 1996 and 2020 (and even then, Democrats won with narrow pluralities). However, recent political realignment has led some to consider Arizona as a swing state, influenced by demographic changes and trends in Maricopa County and other suburban areas in the state.

Democrats have in less recent elections carried the state by large margins amidst favorable national environments. In the 1936 presidential election, Franklin D. Roosevelt won Arizona in a landslide, defeating the Republican Party's candidate Alf Landon by 42.92%, which remains the largest margin of victory for any presidential candidate in the state's history.

The state's electoral votes came under controversy in the 2020 presidential election, when Democratic nominee Joe Biden narrowly defeated incumbent Republican Donald Trump in the state, by a margin of just 0.3%. During the Electoral College vote count, 69 congressional Republicans unsuccessfully objected to the certification of electoral votes of Arizona amidst false claims of fraud.

As of 2024, no Republican has won the presidency without carrying Arizona since its statehood in 1912, although Democrats have won the presidency without carrying the state on six occasions, most recently Barack Obama in 2012.

== Presidential elections ==
Key for parties
American Independent Party – (AI)
Communist Party USA – (CPUSA)
Constitution Party – (CP)
Democratic Party – (D)
Green Party – (G)
Independent candidate – (I)
Libertarian Party – (LI)
Prohibition Party – (PRO)
Progressive Party (1912) – (PR)
Progressive Party (1948) – (PR)
Reform Party – (RE)
Republican Party – (R)
Socialist Party of America – (S)
Socialist Labor Party of America – (SLP)
Union Party – (U)

Note – A double dagger (‡) indicates the national winner.
Note – Percentages may not total 100.0% because of rounding.

Presidential elections in Arizona from 1912 to present
Year	Winner			Runner-up			Other candidate (Note: For purposes of these lists, other candidates are defined as those who were in third place in Arizona.)			EV	Ref.
Year	Candidate	Votes	%	Candidate	Votes	%	Candidate	Votes	%	EV	Ref.
1912	Woodrow Wilson (D)‡	10,324	43.6%	Theodore Roosevelt (PR)	6,949	29.3%	Eugene Debs (S)	3,163	13.4%	3	(Note: The incumbent president William Howard Taft finished fourth in Arizona, receiving 3,021 votes (12.8%).)
1916	Woodrow Wilson (D)‡	33,170	57.2%	Charles Evans Hughes (R)	20,522	35.4%	Allan L. Benson (S)	3,174	5.5%	3	
1920	Warren G. Harding (R) ‡	37,016	55.4%	James M. Cox (D)	29,546	44.2%	Eugene Debs (S)	222	0.3%	3	
1924	Calvin Coolidge (R) ‡	30,516	41.3%	John W. Davis (D)	26,235	35.5%	Robert M. La Follette (PR)	17,210	23.3%	3	
1928	Herbert Hoover (R)‡	52,533	57.6%	Al Smith (D)	38,537	42.2%	William Z. Foster (CPUSA)	184	0.2%	3	
1932	Franklin D. Roosevelt (D)‡	79,264	67.0%	Herbert Hoover (R)	36,104	30.5%	Norman Thomas (S)	2,618	2.2%	3	
1936	Franklin D. Roosevelt (D)‡	86,722	69.8%	Alf Landon (R)	33,433	26.9%	William Lemke (U)	3,307	2.7%	3	
1940	Franklin D. Roosevelt (D)‡	95,267	63.5%	Wendell Willkie (R)	54,030	36.0%	Roger Babson (PRO)	742	0.5%	3	
1944	Franklin D. Roosevelt (D)‡	80,926	58.8%	Thomas E. Dewey (R)	56,287	40.9%	Claude A. Watson (PRO)	421	0.3%	4	
1948	Harry S. Truman (D) ‡	95,251	53.8%	Thomas E. Dewey (R)	77,597	43.8%	Henry A. Wallace (PR)	3,310	1.9%	4	
1952	Dwight D. Eisenhower (R) ‡	152,042	58.3%	Adlai Stevenson (D)	108,528	41.7%	–	–	–	4	
1956	Dwight D. Eisenhower (R) ‡	176,990	61.0%	Adlai Stevenson (D)	112,880	38.9%	T. Coleman Andrews (C)	303	0.1%	4	
1960	Richard Nixon (R)	221,241	55.5%	John F. Kennedy (D) ‡	176,781	44.4%	Eric Hass (SLP)	469	0.1%	4	
1964	Barry Goldwater (Note: Arizona was the home state of Barry Goldwater.) (R)	242,535	50.4%	Lyndon B. Johnson (D) ‡	237,753	49.5%	Eric Hass (SLP)	482	0.1%	5	
1968	Richard Nixon (R) ‡	266,721	54.8%	Hubert Humphrey (D)	170,514	35.0%	George Wallace (AI)	46,573	9.6%	5	
1972	Richard Nixon (R) ‡	402,812	64.7%	George McGovern (D)	198,540	31.9%	John G. Schmitz (AI)	21,208	3.4%	6	
1976	Gerald Ford (R)	418,642	56.4%	Jimmy Carter (D) ‡	295,602	39.8%	Eugene McCarthy (I)	19,229	2.6%	6	
1980	Ronald Reagan (R) ‡	529,688	60.6%	Jimmy Carter (D)	246,843	28.2%	John B. Anderson (I)	76,952	8.8%	6	
1984	Ronald Reagan (R) ‡	681,416	66.4%	Walter Mondale (D)	333,854	32.5%	David Bergland (LI)	10,585	1.0%	7	
1988	George H. W. Bush (R) ‡	702,541	60.0%	Michael Dukakis (D)	454,029	38.7%	Ron Paul (LI)	13,351	1.1%	7	
1992	George H. W. Bush (R)	572,086	38.5%	Bill Clinton (D) ‡	543,050	36.5%	Ross Perot (I)	353,741	23.8%	8	
1996	Bill Clinton (D) ‡	653,288	46.5%	Bob Dole (R)	622,073	44.3%	Ross Perot (RE)	112,072	8.0%	8	
2000	George W. Bush (R) ‡	781,652	51.0%	Al Gore (D)	685,341	44.7%	Ralph Nader (G)	45,645	3.0%	8	
2004	George W. Bush (R)‡	1,104,294	54.9%	John Kerry (D)	893,524	44.4%	Michael Badnarik (LI)	11,856	0.6%	10	
2008	John McCain (Note: Arizona was the home state of John McCain.) (R)	1,230,111	53.6%	Barack Obama (D)‡	1,034,707	45.1%	Bob Barr (LI)	12,555	0.5%	10	
2012	Mitt Romney (R)	1,233,654	53.7%	Barack Obama (D)‡	1,025,232	44.6%	Gary Johnson (LI)	32,100	1.4%	11	
2016	Donald Trump (R)‡	1,252,401	48.7%	Hillary Clinton (D)	1,161,167	45.1%	Gary Johnson (LI)	106,327	4.1%	11	
2020	Joe Biden (D)‡	1,672,143	49.4%	Donald Trump (R)	1,661,686	49.1%	Jo Jorgensen (LI)	51,465	1.5%	11	
2024	Donald Trump (R)‡	1,770,242	52.2%	Kamala Harris (D)	1,582,860	46.7%	Jill Stein (G)	18,319	0.5%	11	

=== Graph ===
View source data.

== See also ==
- Elections in Arizona
- List of United States presidential election results by state

== Works cited ==
- Guide to U.S. Elections. SAGE Publications. 2010. ISBN 978-1-60426-536-1.
- Presidential elections, 1789–1996. Congressional Quarterly. 1997. ISBN 978-1-56802-065-5. LCCN 97019084. OL 673017M.
