= Elections in Arizona =

Elections in Arizona are authorized under the Arizona State Constitution, which establishes elections for the state level officers, cabinet, and legislature.

In a 2020 study, Arizona was ranked as the 21st hardest state for citizens to vote in.

United States presidential election results for Arizona
Year	Republican		Democratic		Third party(ies)	
Year	No.	%	No.	%	No.	%
1912	3,021	12.74%	10,324	43.52%	10,377	43.74%
1916	20,524	35.37%	33,170	57.17%	4,327	7.46%
1920	37,016	55.61%	29,546	44.39%	0	0.00%
1924	30,516	41.26%	26,235	35.47%	17,210	23.27%
1928	52,533	57.57%	38,537	42.23%	184	0.20%
1932	36,104	30.53%	79,264	67.03%	2,883	2.44%
1936	33,433	26.93%	86,722	69.85%	4,008	3.23%
1940	54,030	36.01%	95,267	63.49%	742	0.49%
1944	56,287	40.90%	80,926	58.80%	421	0.31%
1948	77,597	43.82%	95,251	53.79%	4,217	2.38%
1952	152,042	58.35%	108,528	41.65%	0	0.00%
1956	176,990	60.99%	112,880	38.90%	303	0.10%
1960	221,241	55.52%	176,781	44.36%	469	0.12%
1964	242,535	50.45%	237,753	49.45%	482	0.10%
1968	266,721	54.78%	170,514	35.02%	49,701	10.21%
1972	402,812	61.64%	198,540	30.38%	52,153	7.98%
1976	418,642	56.37%	295,602	39.80%	28,475	3.83%
1980	529,688	60.61%	246,843	28.24%	97,414	11.15%
1984	681,416	66.42%	333,854	32.54%	10,627	1.04%
1988	702,541	59.95%	454,029	38.74%	15,303	1.31%
1992	572,086	38.47%	543,050	36.52%	371,870	25.01%
1996	622,073	44.29%	653,288	46.52%	129,044	9.19%
2000	781,652	50.95%	685,341	44.67%	67,120	4.38%
2004	1,104,294	54.77%	893,524	44.32%	18,284	0.91%
2008	1,230,111	53.39%	1,034,707	44.91%	39,020	1.69%
2012	1,233,654	53.48%	1,025,232	44.45%	47,673	2.07%
2016	1,252,401	48.08%	1,161,167	44.58%	191,089	7.34%
2020	1,661,686	49.06%	1,672,143	49.36%	53,497	1.58%
2024	1,770,242	52.22%	1,582,860	46.69%	37,059	1.09%

== Presidential elections ==
Vote in Arizona		National vote	
Year	Candidate	Year	Candidate
2024	Donald Trump	2024	Donald Trump
2020	Joe Biden	2020	Joe Biden
2016	Donald Trump	2016	Donald Trump
2012	Mitt Romney	2012	Barack Obama
2008	John McCain	2008	Barack Obama
2004	George W. Bush	2004	George W. Bush
2000	George W. Bush	2000	George W. Bush
1996	Bill Clinton	1996	Bill Clinton
1992	George H. W. Bush	1992	Bill Clinton
1988	George H. W. Bush	1988	George H. W. Bush
1984	Ronald Reagan	1984	Ronald Reagan
1980	Ronald Reagan	1980	Ronald Reagan
1976	Gerald Ford	1976	Jimmy Carter
1972	Richard Nixon	1972	Richard Nixon
1968	Richard Nixon	1968	Richard Nixon
1964	Barry Goldwater	1964	Lyndon B. Johnson
1960	Richard Nixon	1960	John F. Kennedy
1956	Dwight D. Eisenhower	1956	Dwight D. Eisenhower
1952	Dwight D. Eisenhower	1956	Dwight D. Eisenhower
1948	Harry S. Truman	1948	Harry S. Truman
1944	Franklin D. Roosevelt	1944	Franklin D. Roosevelt
1940	Franklin D. Roosevelt	1940	Franklin D. Roosevelt
1936	Franklin D. Roosevelt	1936	Franklin D. Roosevelt
1932	Franklin D. Roosevelt	1932	Franklin D. Roosevelt
1928	Herbert Hoover	1928	Herbert Hoover
1924	Calvin Coolidge	1924	Calvin Coolidge
1920	Warren G. Harding	1920	Warren G. Harding
1916	Woodrow Wilson	1916	Woodrow Wilson
1912	Woodrow Wilson	1912	Woodrow Wilson

== United States Senate elections ==
Before the ratification of the Seventeenth Amendment to the United States Constitution in 1913, United States senators were elected by state legislatures. Arizona's first two Senate elections, which took place in 1912, still featured popular elections, following which the state legislature unanimously elected their respective victories.

=== Class I (1916–Present) ===
Year	Winner	Votes	Percent	Runner-up	Votes	Percent	Other notable candidates	Votes	Percent	Notes
2024	Ruben Gallego	1,676,335	50.1%	Kari Lake	1,595,761	47.7%				
2018	Kyrsten Sinema	1,191,100	50.0%	Martha McSally	1,135,200	47.6%				
2012	Jeff Flake	1,104,457	49.2%	Richard Carmona	1,036,542	46.2%	Marc J. Victor	102,109	4.6%	
2006	Jon Kyl	814,398	53.3%	Jim Pederson	664,141	43.5%				
2000	Jon Kyl	1,101,196	79.3%	William Toel	109,230	7.8%	Vance Hansen	108,926	7.8%	
1994	Jon Kyl	600,999	53.7%	Sam Coppersmith	442,510	39.5%	Scott Grainger	75,493	6.7%	
1988	Dennis DeConcini	660,403	56.7%	Keith DeGreen	478,060	41.1%				
1982	Dennis DeConcini	411,970	56.9%	Pete Dunn	291,749	40.3%				
1976	Dennis DeConcini	400,334	54.0%	Sam Steiger	321,236	43.3%				
1976	Paul Fannin	228,284	56.0%	Sam Grossman	179,512	44.0%				
1964	Paul Fannin	241,089	51.4%	Roy Elson	227,712	48.6%				
1958	Barry Goldwater	164,593	56.1%	Ernest McFarland	129,030	43.9%				
1952	Barry Goldwater	132,063	51.3%	Ernest McFarland	125,338	48.7%				
1946	Ernest McFarland	80,415	69.2%	Ward S. Powers	35,022	30.1%				
1940	Ernest McFarland	101,495	71.6%	Irving A. Jennings Sr.	29,657	28.0%				
1934	Henry F. Ashurst	67,648	72.0%	Joseph Edward Thompson	24,075	25.6%				
1928	Henry F. Ashurst	47,013	54.2%	Ralph H. Cameron	39,651	45.8%				
1922	Henry F. Ashurst	39,722	65.0%	James Harvey McClintock	21,358	35.0%				
1916	Henry F. Ashurst	29,873	55.4%	Joseph H. Kibbey	21,261	39.4%	W.S. Bradford	2,827	5.2%	

=== Class I (1912) ===
Year	Winner	Popular votes	Percent	Electoral Votes	Runner-up	Popular votes	Percent	Electoral votes	Other notable candidates	Popular Votes	Percent	Electoral votes	Notes
1912	Henry F. Ashurst	10,872	50.0%	54	Ralph H. Cameron	9,640	44.3%	0	E. Johnson	1,234	5.7%	0	

=== Class III (1914 - Present) ===
Year	Winner	Votes	Percent	Runner-up	Votes	Percent	Other notable candidates	Votes	Percent	Notes
2022	Mark Kelly	1,322,027	51.4%	Blake Masters	1,196,308	46.5%				
2020 (special)	Mark Kelly	1,716,467	51.2%	Martha McSally	1,637,661	48.8%				McSally was appointed to this seat in 2019 to replace the retiring Jon Kyl, who was himself appointed in 2018 to replace the deceased John McCain.
2016	John McCain	1,359,267	53.7%	Ann Kirkpatrick	1,031,245	40.8%	Gary Swing	138,634	5.5%	
2010	John McCain	1,005,615	59.1%	Rodney Glassman	592,011	34.8%				
2004	John McCain	1,505,372	76.7%	Stuart Starky	404,507	20.6%				
1998	John McCain	696,577	68.7%	Ed Ranger	275,224	27.2%				
1992	John McCain	771,395	55.8%	Claire Sargent	436,321	31.6%	Evan Mecham	145,361	10.5%	
1986	John McCain	521,850	60.5%	Richard Kimball	340,965	39.5%				
1980	Barry Goldwater	432,371	49.5%	Bill Schulz	422,972	48.4%				
1974	Barry Goldwater	320,396	58.3%	Jonathan Marshall	229,523	41.7%				
1968	Barry Goldwater	274,607	57.2%	Roy Elson	205,338	42.8%				
1962	Carl Hayden	199,217	54.9%	Evan Mecham	163,338	45.1%				
1956	Carl Hayden	170,816	61.4%	Ross F. Jones	107,447	38.6%				
1950	Carl Hayden	116,246	62.8%	Bruce Brockett	68,846	37.2%				
1944	Carl Hayden	90,335	69.4%	Fred Wildon Fickett Jr.	39,891	30.6%				
1938	Carl Hayden	82,714	76.5%	Burt H. Clingan	25,378	23.5%				
1932	Carl Hayden	74,310	66.7%	Ralph H. Cameron	35,737	32.1%				
1926	Carl Hayden	44,591	58.3%	Ralph H. Cameron	31,845	41.7%				
1920	Ralph H. Cameron	35,893	55.2%	Marcus A. Smith	29,169	44.8%				
1914	Marcus A. Smith	25,800	53.2%	Don Lorenzo Hubbell	9,183	18.9%	Eugene W. Chafin	7,293	15.0%	

=== Class III (1912) ===
Year	Winner	Popular votes	Percent	Electoral Votes	Runner-up	Popular votes	Percent	Electoral votes	Other notable candidates	Popular Votes	Percent	Electoral votes	Notes
1912	Marcus A. Smith	10,598	50.35%	54	Hoval A. Smith	9,228	43.85%	0	E.B. Simonton	1,221	5.80%	0	

== Gubernatorial elections ==
Governors of Arizona are elected to a term of four years. Prior to a 1968 amendment to the state constitution, governors of Arizona served two-year terms.

=== 1970 - Present ===
Year	Winner	Votes	Percent	Runner-up	Votes	Percent	Other notable candidates	Votes	Percent	Notes
2022	Katie Hobbs	1,287,891	50.3%	Kari Lake	1,270,774	49.7%				
2018	Doug Ducey	1,330,863	56.0%	David Garcia	994,341	41.8%				
2014	Doug Ducey	805,062	53.4%	Fred DuVal	626,921	41.6%				
2010	Jan Brewer	938,934	54.3%	Terry Goddard	733,935	42.4%				Brewer ascended to the governorship after Janet Napolitano's resignation to become U.S. Secretary of Homeland Security.
2006	Janet Napolitano	959,830	62.6%	Len Munsil	543,528	35.4%				
2002	Janet Napolitano	566,284	46.2%	Matt Salmon	554,465	45.2%	Richard Mahoney	84,947	6.9%	
1998	Jane Dee Hull	620,188	60.9%	Paul Johnson	361,552	35.5%				
1994	Fife Symington	593,492	52.5%	Eddie Basha	500,702	44.3%				
1991 (runoff)	Fife Symington	492,569	52.4%	Terry Goddard	448,168	47.6%				Runoff necessitated because no candidate received over 50% of the vote in the first round
1990	Fife Symington	523,984	49.7%	Terry Goddard	519,691	49.2%	Max Hawkins (write-in)	10,983	1.0%	Symington and Goddard advanced to runoff
1986	Evan Mecham	343,913	39.67%	Carolyn Warner	298,986	34.49%	Bill Schulz	224,085	25.85%	
1982	Bruce Babbitt	453,795	62.5%	Leo Corbet	235,877	32.5%	Sam Steiger	36,649	5.1%	
1978	Bruce Babbitt	282,605	52.5%	Evan Mecham	241,093	44.8%				
1974	Raúl Héctor Castro	278,375	50.4%	Russell Williams	273,674	49.6%				
1970	Jack Williams	209,355	50.9%	Raúl Héctor Castro	202,053	49.1%				

=== 1911 - 1968 ===
Year	Winner	Votes	Percent	Runner-up	Votes	Percent	Other notable candidates	Votes	Percent	Notes
1968	Jack Williams	279,923	57.8%	Samuel Goddard	204,075	42.2%				
1966	Jack Williams	203,438	53.8%	Samuel Goddard	174,904	46.2%				
1964	Samuel Goddard	252,098	53.2%	Richard Kleindienst	221,404	46.8%				
1962	Paul Fannin	200,578	54.8%	Samuel Goddard	165,263	45.2%				
1960	Paul Fannin	235,502	59.3%	Lee Ackerman	161,605	40.7%				
1958	Paul Fannin	160,136	55.1%	Robert Morrison	130,329	44.9%				
1956	Ernest McFarland	171,848	59.5%	Horace B. Griffen	116,744	40.5%				
1954	Ernest McFarland	128,104	52.5%	John Howard Pyle	115,866	47.5%				
1952	John Howard Pyle	156,592	60.16%	Joe C. Haldiman	103,693	39.84%				
1950	John Howard Pyle	99,109	50.77%	Ana Frohmiller	96,118	49.23%				
1948	Dan Edward Garvey	104,008	59.17%	Bruce Brockett	70,419	40.06%				
1946	Sidney Preston Osborn	73,595	60.10%	Bruce Brockett	48,867	39.90%				
1944	Sidney Preston Osborn	100,220	77.91%	Jerrie W. Lee	27,261	21.9%				
1942	Sidney Preston Osborn	63,484	72.48%	Jerrie W. Lee	23,562	26.90%				
1940	Sidney Preston Osborn	97,606	65.52%	Jerrie W. Lee	50,358	33.81%				
1938	Robert Taylor Jones	80,350	68.57%	Jerrie W. Lee	32,022	27.33%				
1936	Rawghlie Clement Stanford	87,678	70.68%	Thomas Edward Campbell	36,114	29.11%				
1934	Benjamin Baker Moeur	61,355	59.65%	Thomas Maddock	39,242	38.15%				
1932	Benjamin Baker Moeur	75,314	63.22%	Jack Kinney	42,202	35.43%				
1930	George W.P. Hunt	48,875	51.39%	John Calhoun Phillips	46,231	48.61%				
1928	John Calhoun Phillips	47,829	51.71%	George W.P. Hunt	44,553	48.16%				
1926	George W.P. Hunt	39,979	50.25%	Elias S. Clark	39,580	49.75%				
1924	George W.P. Hunt	38,372	50.53%	Dwight B. Heard	37,571	49.47%				
1922	George W.P. Hunt	37,310	54.94%	Thomas E. Campbell	30,599	45.06%				
1920	Thomas E. Campbell	37,060	54.15%	Mit Simms	31,385	45.85%				
1918	Thomas E. Campbell	25,927	49.9%	Fred T. Colter	25,588	49.3%				
1916	George W.P. Hunt	28,094	48.01%	Thomas E. Campbell	28,051	47.94%				Campbell was sworn in as governor on January 1, 1917, but Hunt declared the winner after recount and subsequently took office
1914	George W.P. Hunt	25,226	49.46%	Ralph H. Cameron	17,602	34.51%	George U. Young	5,206	10.20%	
1911	George W.P. Hunt	11,123	51.46%	Edmund W. Wells	9,166	42.41%	P.W. Gallentine	1,247	5.77%	

== See also ==
- 2024 Arizona elections
- 2026 Arizona elections
- Women's suffrage in Arizona
- List of Arizona state legislatures
