= 1924 United States presidential election in Arizona =

- November 4, 1924

All 3 Arizona votes to the Electoral College

Nominee	Calvin Coolidge	John W. Davis	Robert M. La Follette
Party	Republican	Democratic	Independent Progressive
Home state	Massachusetts	West Virginia	Wisconsin
Running mate	Charles G. Dawes	Charles W. Bryan	Burton K. Wheeler
Electoral vote	3	0	0
Popular vote	30,516	26,235	17,210
Percentage	41.26%	35.47%	23.27%
County results
Coolidge
30–40%
40–50%
Davis
30–40%
40–50%
50–60%
President before election
Calvin Coolidge
Republican
Elected President
Calvin Coolidge
Republican

The 1924 United States presidential election in Arizona took place on November 4, 1924, as part of the 1924 United States presidential election. State voters chose three representatives, or electors, to the Electoral College, who voted for president and vice president.

Arizona was won by incumbent Republican President Calvin Coolidge, and his running mate Charles G. Dawes, winning 41.26% of the popular vote. Coolidge's percentage of victory was significantly lower than previous Republican President Warren G. Harding who earned a solid 55.6% of the total vote. Many progressive Republicans who sided with Harding in 1920, split from the party again voting for Progressive Party candidate Robert M. La Follette who received an astounding 23.27% of the popular vote. La Follette was a Progressive Republican Senator from Wisconsin who chose to run for president against conservative Republican President Calvin Coolidge, whom he disagreed with on economic issues. LaFollette's greatest strength was found in the Western states, particularly Arizona where many voters disapproved of both conservative nominees for the Republican and Democratic Party.

Former U.S. Ambassador to the United Kingdom John W. Davis was the Democratic nominee who had little support outside the South, including Arizona where he received a mere 35.47% of the popular vote, running with Charles W. Bryan, younger brother of former perennial presidential candidate William Jennings Bryan.

== Results ==
1924 United States presidential election in Arizona
Party	Candidate	Votes	%
Republican	Calvin Coolidge (incumbent)	30,516	41.26%
Democratic	John W. Davis	26,235	35.47%
Progressive	Robert M. La Follette	17,210	23.27%
Total votes		73,961	100.00%

=== Results by county ===
County	Calvin Coolidge Republican		John W. Davis Democratic		Robert M. La Follette Independent Progressive		Margin		Total votes cast
County	#	%	#	%	#	%	#	%	Total votes cast
Apache	620	48.51%	548	42.88%	110	8.61%	72	5.63%	1,278
Cochise	3,712	38.27%	3,496	36.04%	2,491	25.68%	216	2.23%	9,699
Coconino	1,045	45.10%	711	30.69%	561	24.21%	334	14.41%	2,317
Gila	2,193	34.55%	2,218	34.94%	1,937	30.51%	-25	-0.39%	6,348
Graham	813	33.17%	1,252	51.08%	386	15.75%	-439	-17.91%	2,451
Greenlee	404	29.97%	768	56.97%	176	13.06%	-364	-27.00%	1,348
Maricopa	10,611	44.66%	9,177	38.63%	3,970	16.71%	1,434	6.03%	23,758
Mohave	738	38.00%	475	24.46%	729	37.54%	9 (Note: In this county where La Follette ran second ahead of Davis, margin given is Coolidge vote minus La Follette vote and percentage margin Coolidge percentage minus La Follette percentage.)	0.46%	1,942
Navajo	1,060	42.90%	684	27.68%	727	29.42%	333	13.48%	2,471
Pima	3,559	42.17%	2,594	30.74%	2,286	27.09%	965	11.43%	8,439
Pinal	1,075	40.86%	988	37.55%	568	21.59%	87	3.31%	2,631
Santa Cruz	579	39.93%	673	46.41%	198	13.66%	-94	-6.48%	1,450
Yavapai	2,827	41.80%	1,800	26.62%	2,136	31.58%	691	10.22%	6,763
Yuma	1,280	41.75%	851	27.76%	935	30.50%	345	11.25%	3,066
Totals	30,516	41.26%	26,235	35.47%	17,210	23.27%	4,281	5.79%	73,961

==== Counties that flipped from Republican to Democratic ====
- Gila
- Santa Cruz

=== Electors ===
Electors were chosen by their party's voters in primary elections held on September 9, 1924.

John W. Davis & Charles W. Bryan Democratic Party	Calvin Coolidge & Charles G. Dawes Republican Party	Robert M. La Follette & Burton K. Wheeler Independent Progressive
G. D. Barclay; Richard H. Ramsey; Sidney Sapp	J. H. Campbell; George O. Ford; Sharlot M. Hall	T. H. Greenfield; Louis G. Hummel; Margarot Shaffer

== See also ==
- United States presidential elections in Arizona
