= 1980 United States presidential election in Arizona =

- November 4, 1980

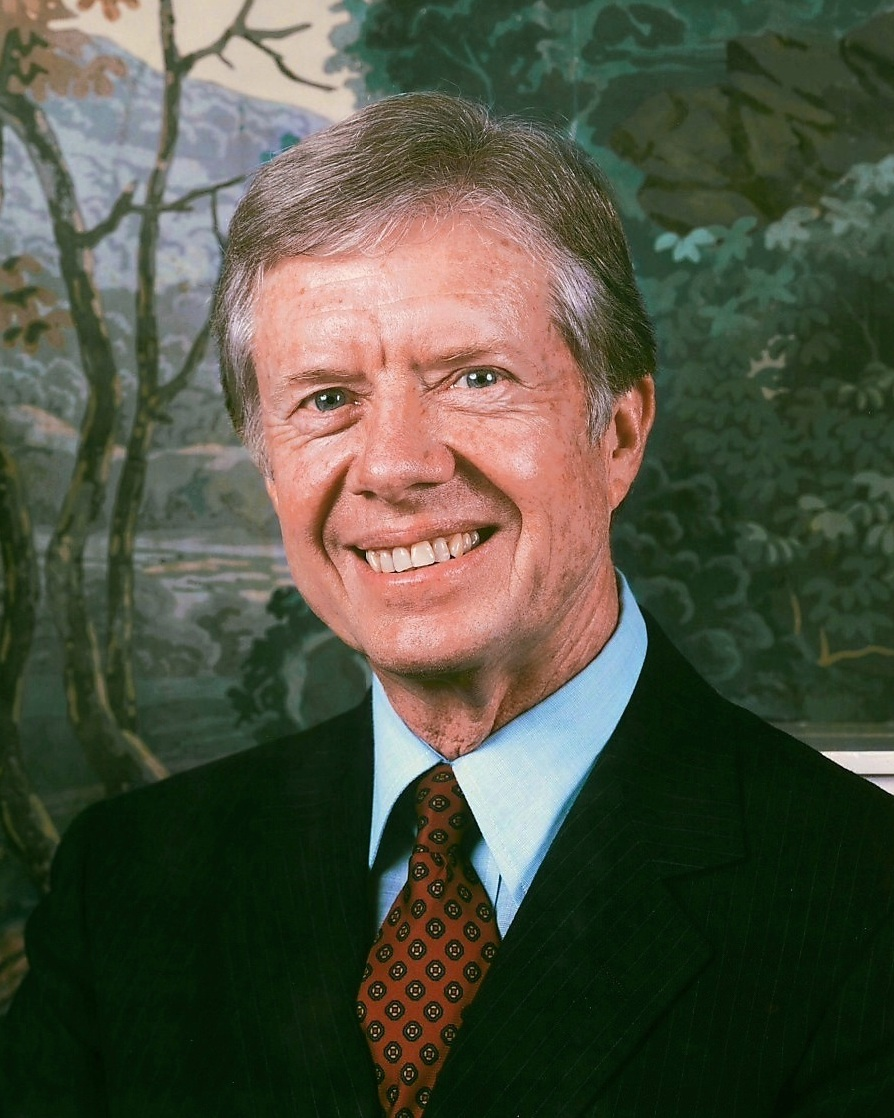

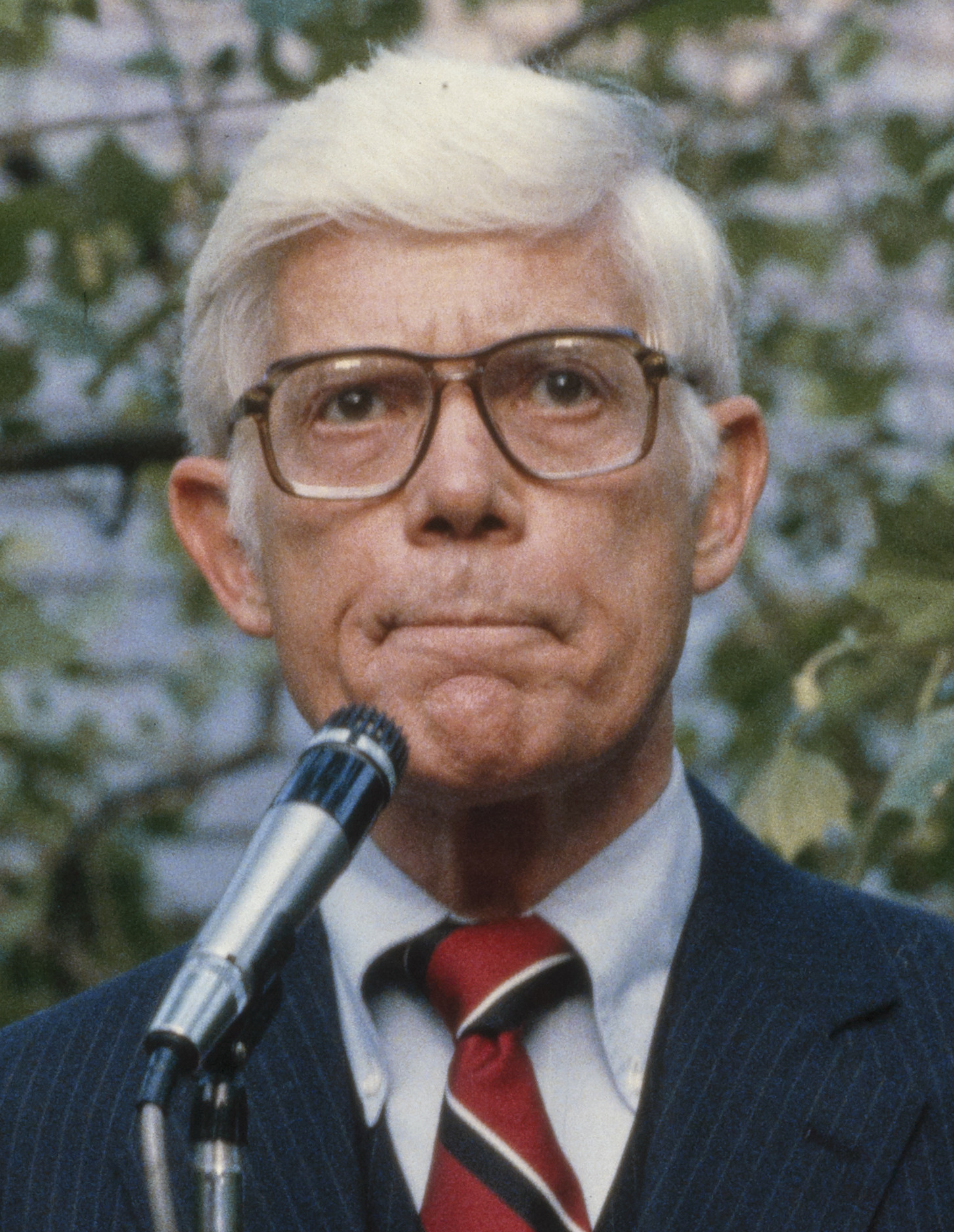
Nominee	Ronald Reagan	Jimmy Carter	John B. Anderson
Party	Republican	Democratic	Independent
Home state	California	Georgia	Illinois
Running mate	George H. W. Bush	Walter Mondale	Patrick Lucey
Electoral vote	6	0	0
Popular vote	529,688	246,843	76,952
Percentage	60.61%	28.24%	8.81%
County results
Reagan
40–50%
50–60%
60–70%
Carter
50–60%
President before election
Jimmy Carter
Democratic
Elected President
Ronald Reagan
Republican

The 1980 United States presidential election in Arizona took place on November 4, 1980. All fifty states and The District of Columbia were part of the 1980 United States presidential election. State voters chose six electors to the Electoral College, who voted for president and vice president.

Arizona was won by former California Governor Ronald Reagan by a landslide of 32%. This result left the state 22.62% more Republican than the nation at-large, a differential greater even than when Barry Goldwater narrowly won his home state during his 1964 landslide defeat, and the most Republican relative to the nation at-large Arizona has ever been since statehood in 1912. Reagan's victory margin was at the time the largest by a Republican, though he would beat his own record four years later. Only Franklin D. Roosevelt won Arizona by a larger margin in 1932 and 1936, whilst Carter's share of the popular vote remains the worst ever by a Democrat in Arizona.

Reagan won every county except for heavily unionized Greenlee, which would never vote Republican until 2000, in the process duplicating the state's 1972 county map. As of the 2024 presidential election, this is the last election that Apache County has supported the Republican nominee.

Carter's insensitivity to essential issues in the West, especially water supply, ensured he would be comfortably beaten in this normally solidly Republican state, which had been the only state no Democrat carried during the dealigned 1960s and 1970s.

== Primaries ==
1980 Arizona Caucus
Candidates	CDs	Delegates
Ted Kennedy	9,738	17
Jimmy Carter (incumbent)	7,592	13
Totals	17,330	30

== Results ==
1980 United States presidential election in Arizona
Party	Candidate	Votes	Percentage	Electoral votes
Republican	Ronald Reagan	529,688	60.61%	6
Democrat	Jimmy Carter (incumbent)	246,843	28.24%	0
Independent	John Anderson	76,952	8.81%	0
Libertarian	Ed Clark	18,784	2.15%	0
Socialist Workers	Clifton DeBerry	1,110	0.13%	0
Citizens	Barry Commoner (write-in)	551	0.06%	0
Communist	Gus Hall (write-in)	25	0.00%	0
Workers World	Deirdre Griswold (write-in)	2	0.00%	0
Totals		873,945	100.00%	6
Voter turnout (Voting age/Registered voters)				44%/78%

=== Results by county ===
County	Ronald Reagan Republican		Jimmy Carter Democratic		John B. Anderson Independent		Ed Clark Libertarian		Various candidates Other parties		Margin		Total votes cast
County	#	%	#	%	#	%	#	%	#	%	#	%	Total votes cast
Apache	5,991	56.55%	3,917	36.97%	495	4.67%	156	1.47%	36	0.34%	2,074	19.58%	10,595
Cochise	13,351	59.48%	7,028	31.31%	1,656	7.38%	375	1.67%	35	0.16%	6,323	28.17%	22,445
Coconino	14,613	55.78%	7,832	29.89%	2,815	10.74%	861	3.29%	78	0.30%	6,781	25.89%	26,199
Gila	7,405	55.27%	5,068	37.82%	656	4.90%	259	1.93%	11	0.08%	2,337	17.45%	13,399
Graham	4,765	59.85%	2,801	35.18%	268	3.37%	121	1.52%	6	0.08%	1,964	24.67%	7,961
Greenlee	1,537	40.64%	2,043	54.02%	150	3.97%	48	1.27%	4	0.11%	-506	-13.38%	3,782
Maricopa	316,287	64.97%	119,752	24.60%	38,975	8.01%	10,825	2.22%	995	0.20%	196,535	40.37%	486,834
Mohave	13,809	68.86%	4,900	24.43%	978	4.88%	342	1.71%	25	0.12%	8,909	44.43%	20,054
Navajo	10,790	63.91%	5,110	30.27%	710	4.21%	248	1.47%	24	0.14%	5,680	33.64%	16,882
Pima	93,055	49.75%	64,418	34.44%	25,294	13.52%	3,944	2.11%	346	0.18%	28,637	15.31%	187,057
Pinal	12,195	52.43%	9,207	39.59%	1,346	5.79%	472	2.03%	38	0.16%	2,988	12.84%	23,258
Santa Cruz	2,674	50.07%	2,089	39.12%	482	9.03%	76	1.42%	19	0.36%	585	10.95%	5,340
Yavapai	19,823	68.37%	6,664	22.98%	1,754	6.05%	711	2.45%	42	0.14%	13,159	45.39%	28,994
Yuma	13,393	63.34%	6,014	28.44%	1,373	6.49%	346	1.64%	19	0.09%	7,379	34.90%	21,145
Totals	529,688	60.61%	246,843	28.24%	76,952	8.81%	18,784	2.15%	1,678	0.19%	282,845	32.37%	873,945

==== Counties that flipped from Democratic to Republican ====
- Apache
- Gila
- Navajo
- Pinal

=== Results by congressional district ===
District	Reagan	Carter	Representative
1st	63.6%	27.6%	John Jacob Rhodes
2nd	51.8%	35.3%	Mo Udall
3rd	66.1%	27.0%	Bob Stump
4th	66.7%	25.9%	Eldon Rudd

=== Electors ===
Electors were chosen by their party's voters in primary elections held on September 9, 1980.

Jimmy Carter & Walter Mondale Democratic Party	Ronald Reagan & George H. W. Bush Republican Party	John B. Anderson & Patrick J. Lucey Independent	Ed Clark & David Koch Libertarian Party
Marian S. Bauhs; Ora W. DeConcini; Joe Fuchs; Marcia G. Imber; Jeanne Perpich; Mat Wheeler	Karl Eller; Laura B. Lowry; Jane P. Lynch; Myrtle Stella Macy; Sam A. Phillips; John Scott Van Wyk	Mary Dent Crisp; Dorothy Blanch Levin; Armando Rivera; James Lee Sanders; Stewart Lee Udall; Jean H. Wilson	Janis Kathleen Blainer; Carl Brown; Edward R. Carlson; John Kannarr; James T. Kirk; Irene Leitch

Clifton DeBerry & Matilde Zimmermann Socialist Workers Party	Barry Commoner & LaDonna Harris Citizens Party	Gus Hall & Angela Davis Communist Party	Deirdre Griswold & Gavrielle Holmes Workers World Party
Joseph Callahan; Alberta J. Dannells; Jill Fein; Caroline Fowlkes; Eleanor Garcia; Betsy McDonald	Ed Clay; Bob England; Lois George; Paige Grant; Ken Gross; Ken Scott	Patricia J. Blawis; Alonzo S. Howard; John V. Mackoviak; Arvilla Padilla; Pelix Padilla; Jeanne K. Scanlon	Marianne Ditton; Jay Evenson; Patricia L. Jackson; Patricia J. James; Paul Teitelbaum; Eric Zeiters
