= Graham County, Arizona =

County in Arizona, United States

- County
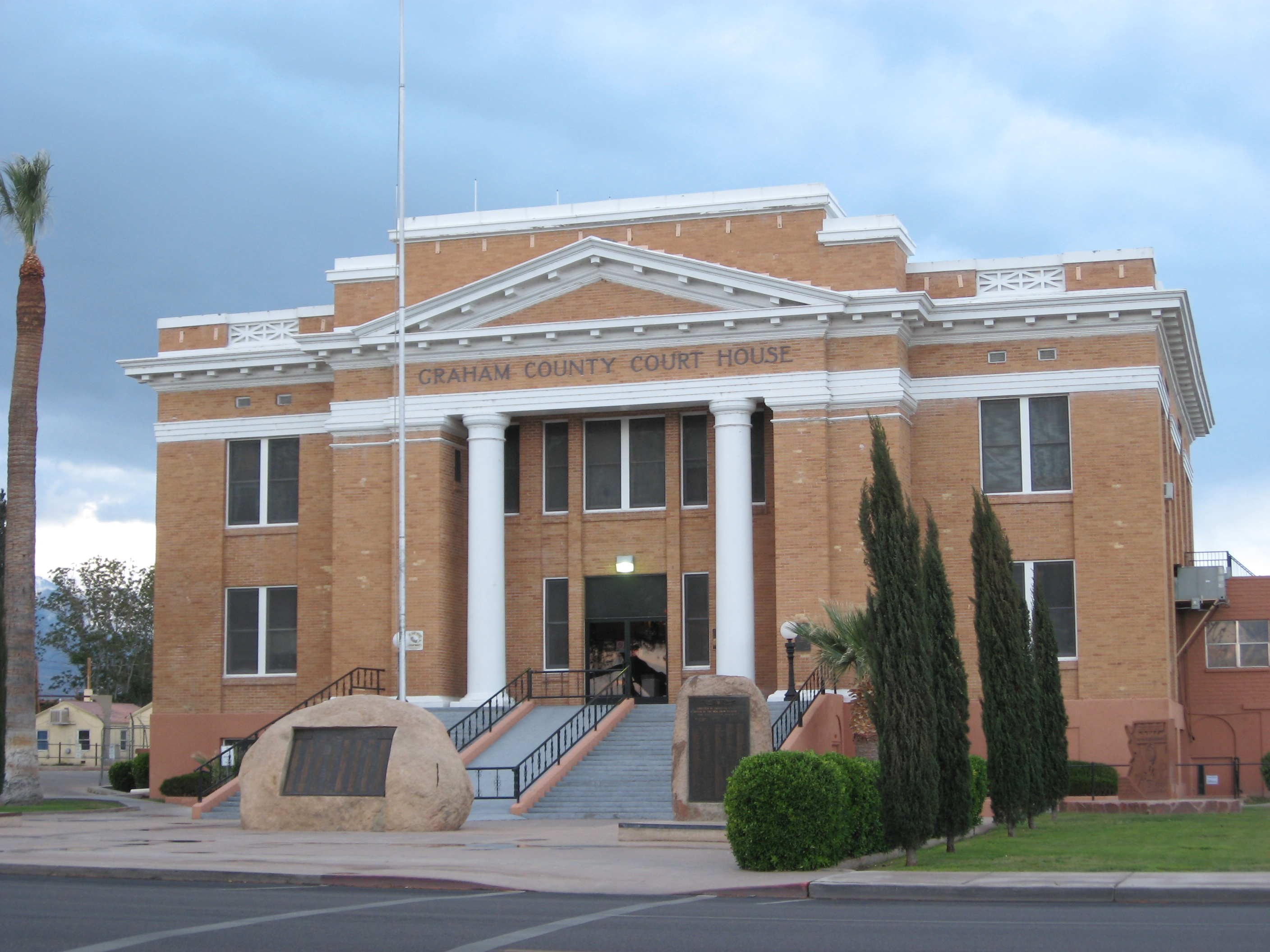
- Graham County Courthouse in Safford

- Location within the U.S. state of Arizona
- Coordinates: 33.04°N 109.78°W
- Country: United States
- State: Arizona
- Founded: March 10, 1881
- Named for: Mount Graham
- Seat: Safford
- Largest city: Safford

Area
  - Total: 4,641 sq mi (12,020 km^{2})
  - Land: 4,623 sq mi (11,970 km^{2})
  - Water: 19 sq mi (49 km^{2}) 0.4%

Population (2020)
  - Total: 38,533
  - Estimate (2025): 40,157 ▲
  - Density: 8.335/sq mi (3.218/km^{2})
- Time zone: UTC−7 (Mountain)
- Congressional districts: 2nd, 6th
- Website: www.graham.az.gov

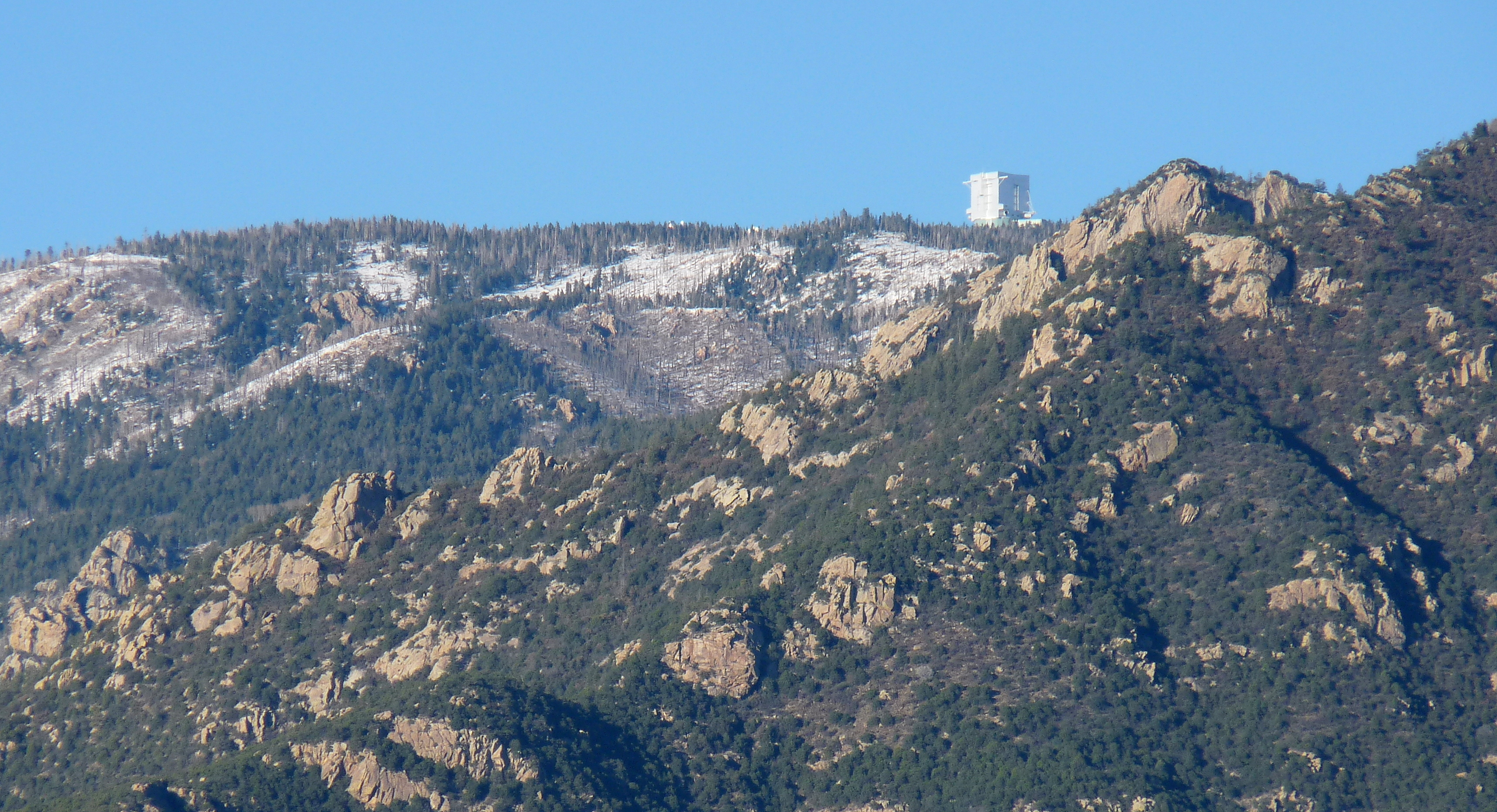
The Large Binocular Telescope on the summit ridge of the Pinaleno Mountains, Graham County

Graham County is a county in the southeastern part of the U.S. state of Arizona. As of the 2020 census, the population was 38,533, making it the third-least populous county in Arizona. The county seat is Safford.

Graham County composes the Safford micropolitan area, as defined by the United States Census Bureau, a micropolitan statistical area (μSA) consisting of one county; it is anchored by the city of Safford. Before 2013, Safford micropolitan statistical area also contained Greenlee County, Arizona. In 2013, the United States Office of Management and Budget removed Greenlee county from the micropolitan area's definition.

The county is home to several organizations including Eastern Arizona College and the Mount Graham International Observatory, which includes one of the world's largest and most powerful telescopes. Graham County is also home to the Arizona Salsa Trail and the annual Salsa Fest.

Graham County contains part of the San Carlos Apache Indian Reservation.

== History ==
Joseph Knight Rogers, an early settler in the area, and a member of the Arizona Territorial Legislature, is known as the father of Graham County: he introduced the bill in the territorial legislature creating it. The new county was created from southern Apache County and eastern Pima County on March 10, 1881. Initially, the county seat was located in the city of Safford but was later moved to Solomonville in 1883. This change was undone in 1915, returning the county seat to Safford.

Graham County is named after the mountain of the same name which was, in turn, named after Lt. Col James Duncan Graham. The county was the first in Arizona to break the tradition of naming counties for Native Americans.

== Geography ==
According to the United States Census Bureau, the county has a total area of 4,641 square miles (12,020 km^{2}), of which 4,623 square miles (11,970 km^{2}) is land and 19 square miles (49 km^{2}) (0.4%) is water. The county has various mountain peaks including Mount Graham, which is the highest mountain in the Pinaleno Mountains.

=== Adjacent counties ===
- Cochise County — south
- Pima County — southwest
- Pinal County — west
- Gila County — northwest
- Navajo County — north
- Apache County — north
- Greenlee County — east

=== National protected areas ===
- Coronado National Forest (part)
- Gila Box Riparian National Conservation Area (part)

=== Major highways ===
- U.S. Route 70
- U.S. Route 191
- State Route 266
- State Route 366

== Demographics ==
Historical population
Census	Pop.	Note	%±
1890	5,670		—
1900	14,162		149.8%
1910	23,999		69.5%
1920	10,148		−57.7%
1930	10,373		2.2%
1940	12,113		16.8%
1950	12,985		7.2%
1960	14,045		8.2%
1970	16,578		18.0%
1980	22,862		37.9%
1990	26,554		16.1%
2000	33,489		26.1%
2010	37,220		11.1%
2020	38,533		3.5%
2025 (est.)	40,157	▲	4.2%
U.S. Decennial Census; 1790–1960 1900–1990; 1990–2000 2010–2020

As of 2010, the United States Census Bureau estimates that the μSA had a population of 37,220.

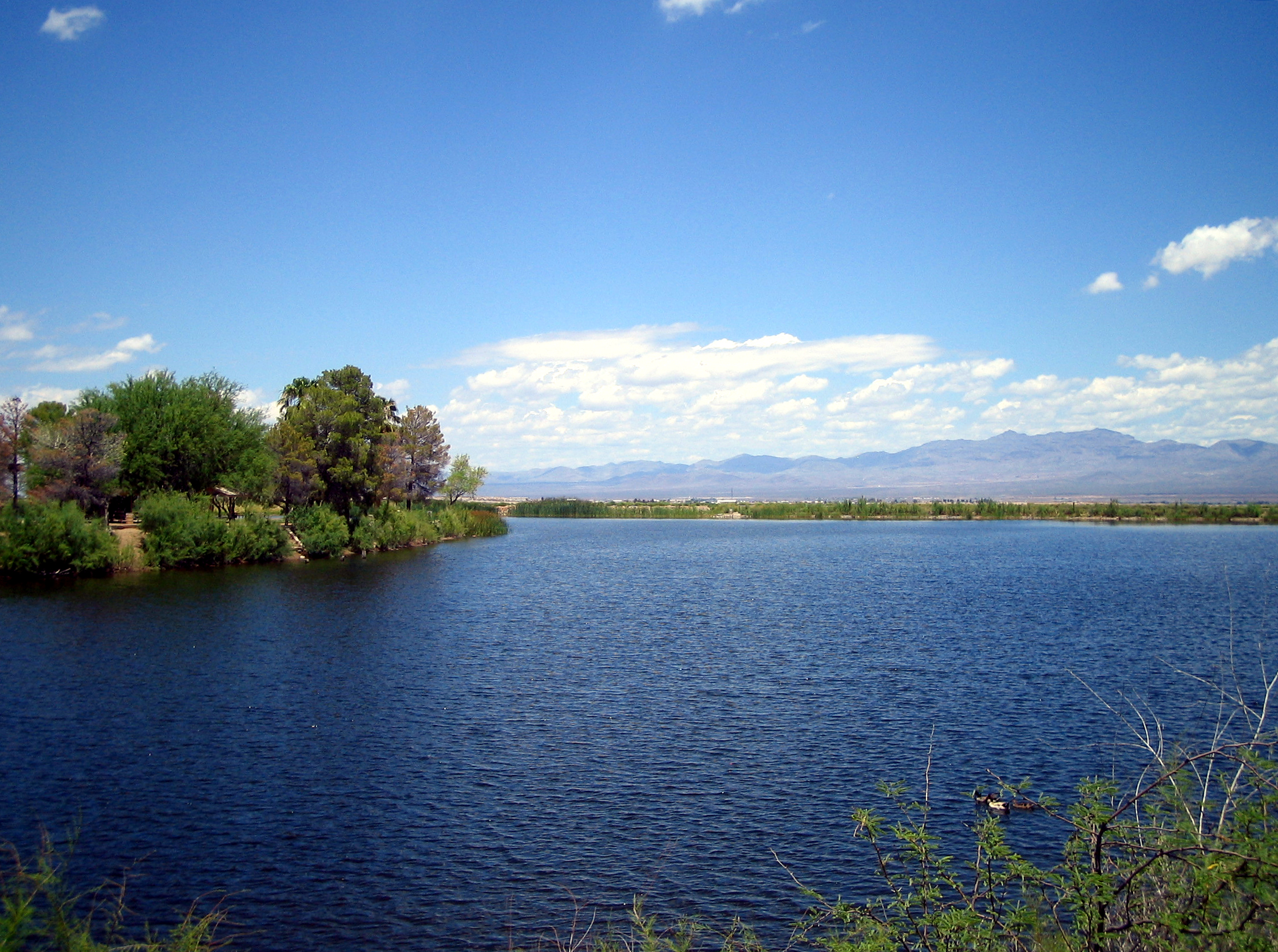
Roper Lake, south of Safford

=== Racial and ethnic composition ===
Graham County, Arizona – Racial and ethnic composition Note: the US Census treats Hispanic/Latino as an ethnic category. This table excludes Latinos from the racial categories and assigns them to a separate category. Hispanics/Latinos may be of any race.
Race / Ethnicity (NH = Non-Hispanic)	2020	2010	2000	1990	1980
White alone (NH)	52.9% (20,398)	52.4% (19,483)	55.2% (18,488)	58.1% (15,437)	61.2% (13,991)
Black alone (NH)	1.2% (453)	1.7% (633)	1.8% (602)	1.8% (468)	2.3% (532)
American Indian alone (NH)	13.4% (5,143)	13.6% (5,074)	14.4% (4,819)	14.5% (3,857)	11.8% (2,696)
Asian alone (NH)	0.4% (169)	0.5% (193)	0.5% (182)	0.4% (97)	0.6% (134)
Pacific Islander alone (NH)	0% (16)	0.1% (49)	0% (10)		
Other race alone (NH)	0.3% (102)	0.1% (33)	0.1% (28)	0% (13)	0.2% (39)
Multiracial (NH)	2.1% (824)	1.2% (435)	0.9% (306)	—	—
Hispanic/Latino (any race)	29.7% (11,428)	30.4% (11,320)	27% (9,054)	25.2% (6,682)	23.9% (5,470)

=== American Community Survey 2025 data ===
The United States Census Bureau estimated that in 2025, Graham County’s population was 40.157. It was also estimated that the county's population was 52,27% Non-Hispanic White, 32,02% Hispanic or Latino, 1,23% Non-Hispanic Black, 0,54% Asian, 11,99% Native American, 0,09% Pacific Islander, and 1,86% Multiracial.

Total	Population	Percentage
Non-Hispanic White	20.990	52,27%
Hispanic or Latino	12.858	32,02%
Non-Hispanic Black	495	1,23%
Asian	217	0,54%
Native American	4.813	11,99%
Pacific Islander	37	0,09%
Non-Hispanic Multiracial	747	1,86%

As of the census of 2000 including both Graham and Greenlee counties, there were 42,036 people, 13,233 households, and 9,883 families residing within the μSA. The racial makeup of the μSA was 68.5% White, 1.6% African American, 12.2% Native American, 0.5% Asian, <0.1% Pacific Islander, 14.7% from other races, and 2.4% from two or more races. Hispanic or Latino of any race were 30.3% of the population. The median income for a household in the μSA was $34,526, and the median income for a family was $38,970. Males had a median income of $34,738 versus $22,036 for females. The per capita income for the μSA was $13,977.

=== 2020 census ===
As of the 2020 census, the county had a population of 38,533. Of the residents, 28.1% were under the age of 18 and 14.4% were 65 years of age or older; the median age was 33.8 years. For every 100 females there were 111.1 males, and for every 100 females age 18 and over there were 114.5 males. 47.6% of residents lived in urban areas and 52.4% lived in rural areas.

The racial makeup of the county was 65.0% White, 1.4% Black or African American, 14.0% American Indian and Alaska Native, 0.5% Asian, 0.1% Native Hawaiian and Pacific Islander, 8.4% from some other race, and 10.7% from two or more races. Hispanic or Latino residents of any race comprised 29.7% of the population.

There were 12,150 households in the county, of which 39.5% had children under the age of 18 living with them and 25.6% had a female householder with no spouse or partner present. About 23.4% of all households were made up of individuals and 11.0% had someone living alone who was 65 years of age or older.

There were 13,704 housing units, of which 11.3% were vacant. Among occupied housing units, 71.5% were owner-occupied and 28.5% were renter-occupied. The homeowner vacancy rate was 2.1% and the rental vacancy rate was 9.4%.

=== 2010 census ===
As of the census of 2010, there were 37,220 people, 11,120 households, and 8,188 families living in the county. The population density was 8.1 inhabitants per square mile (3.1 inhabitants/km^{2}). There were 12,980 housing units at an average density of 2.8 units per square mile (1.1 units/km^{2}). The racial makeup of the county was 72.1% white, 14.4% American Indian, 1.8% black or African American, 0.5% Asian, 0.1% Pacific islander, 8.2% from other races, and 2.8% from two or more races. Those of Hispanic or Latino origin made up 30.4% of the population. In terms of ancestry, 16.1% were English, 9.2% were German, 6.9% were Irish, and 4.3% were American.

Of the 11,120 households, 41.4% had children under the age of 18 living with them, 52.0% were married couples living together, 15.5% had a female householder with no husband present, 26.4% were non-families, and 21.7% of all households were made up of individuals. The average household size was 3.01 and the average family size was 3.50. The median age was 31.6 years.

The median income for a household in the county was $41,683 and the median income for a family was $48,005. Males had a median income of $41,732 versus $25,990 for females. The per capita income for the county was $15,644. About 15.9% of families and 20.0% of the population were below the poverty line, including 26.3% of those under age 18 and 9.7% of those age 65 or over.

=== 2000 census ===
As of the census of 2000, there were 33,489 people, 10,116 households, and 7,617 families living in the county. The population density was 7 people per square mile (2.7 people/km^{2}). There were 11,430 housing units at an average density of 2 units per square mile (0.77 units/km^{2}). The racial makeup of the county was 67.1% White, 1.9% Black or African American, 15.0% Native American, 0.6% Asian, <0.1% Pacific Islander, 13.4% from other races, and 2.1% from two or more races. 27.0% of the population were Hispanic or Latino of any race. 16.4% reported speaking Spanish at home, while 6.4% speak a Southern Athabaskan language.

There were 10,116 households, out of which 39.0% had children under the age of 18 living with them, 57.2% were married couples living together, 13.4% had a female householder with no husband present, and 24.7% were non-families. 20.9% of all households were made up of individuals, and 9.9% had someone living alone who was 65 years of age or older. The average household size was 2.99 and the average family size was 3.47.

In the county, the population was spread out, with 30.1% under the age of 18, 12.0% from 18 to 24, 27.3% from 25 to 44, 18.7% from 45 to 64, and 11.9% who were 65 years of age or older. The median age was 31 years. For every 100 females, there were 112.5 males. For every 100 females age 18 and over, there were 115.1 males.

The median income for a household in the county was $29,668, and the median income for a family was $34,417. Males had a median income of $30,524 versus $20,739 for females. The per capita income for the county was $12,139. About 17.7% of families and 23.0% of the population were below the poverty line, including 30.2% of those under age 18 and 13.6% of those age 65 or over.

== Politics ==
In its early days Graham County was a solidly Democratic county. It voted for the Democratic nominee in every presidential election from 1912 to 1952, being one of only four Western counties outside New Mexico to support James M. Cox in 1920, and one of only five to support John W. Davis in 1924. Since the 1950s, however, Graham has become a reliable Republican county, usually rivaling Mohave and Yavapai as the most Republican in Arizona, and sometimes, as in 2004 and 2000, being the “reddest” of all the state's counties. No Democratic presidential nominee has carried Graham County since Lyndon B. Johnson – against Arizona native Barry Goldwater – did so in 1964, though Bill Clinton, who carried significant national rural appeal as a Democrat in the 1990s, came close in 1996.

The county was one of two in Arizona to vote against 2024 Arizona Proposition 139, which established a right to abortion in the state's constitution, along with neighboring Gila County.

United States presidential election results for Graham County, Arizona
Year	Republican		Democratic		Third party(ies)	
Year	No.	%	No.	%	No.	%
1912	103	9.74%	540	51.09%	414	39.17%
1916	497	22.02%	1,597	70.76%	163	7.22%
1920	1,062	45.72%	1,261	54.28%	0	0.00%
1924	813	33.17%	1,252	51.08%	386	15.75%
1928	1,238	43.27%	1,615	56.45%	8	0.28%
1932	718	19.81%	2,867	79.09%	40	1.10%
1936	680	15.54%	3,541	80.94%	154	3.52%
1940	1,161	26.94%	3,130	72.62%	19	0.44%
1944	1,151	32.43%	2,393	67.43%	5	0.14%
1948	1,209	35.71%	2,139	63.17%	38	1.12%
1952	2,191	49.90%	2,200	50.10%	0	0.00%
1956	2,384	58.55%	1,688	41.45%	0	0.00%
1960	2,491	54.35%	2,091	45.63%	1	0.02%
1964	2,655	48.82%	2,783	51.18%	0	0.00%
1968	2,327	47.21%	1,726	35.02%	876	17.77%
1972	3,575	60.15%	1,863	31.35%	505	8.50%
1976	3,659	52.59%	3,050	43.83%	249	3.58%
1980	4,765	59.85%	2,801	35.18%	395	4.96%
1984	5,247	62.35%	3,080	36.60%	89	1.06%
1988	5,120	59.18%	3,407	39.38%	125	1.44%
1992	4,169	42.98%	3,391	34.96%	2,139	22.05%
1996	4,222	45.42%	3,938	42.36%	1,136	12.22%
2000	6,007	62.16%	3,355	34.72%	302	3.13%
2004	7,467	69.65%	3,185	29.71%	68	0.63%
2008	8,376	69.40%	3,487	28.89%	206	1.71%
2012	8,076	67.84%	3,609	30.31%	220	1.85%
2016	8,025	65.34%	3,301	26.88%	955	7.78%
2020	10,749	71.68%	4,034	26.90%	213	1.42%
2024	11,177	73.62%	3,867	25.47%	139	0.92%

== Communities ==
Locations of incorporated and unincorporated areas as well as Indian reservations in Graham County

=== City ===
- Safford (county seat)

=== Towns ===
- Pima
- Thatcher

=== Census-designated places ===
- Bryce
- Bylas
- Cactus Flats
- Central
- Fort Thomas
- Peridot (partially in Gila County)
- San Jose
- Solomon
- Swift Trail Junction

=== Unincorporated communities ===
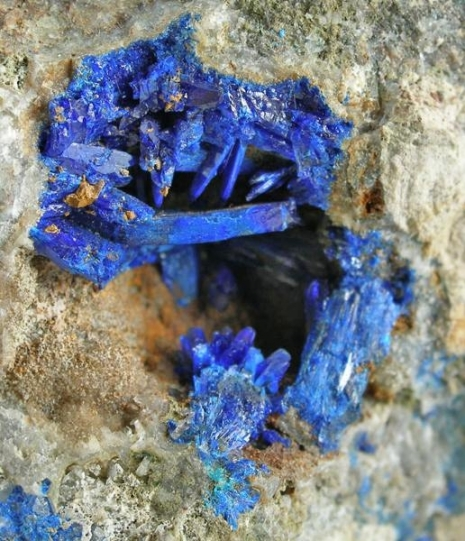
Linarite specimen from the old Grand Reef mine near Klondyke

- Bonita
- Eden
- Fort Grant

=== Ghost towns ===
- Aravaipa
- Camp Goodwin
- Geronimo
- Klondyke
- Spenazuma

=== Indian communities ===
- San Carlos Apache Indian Reservation

=== County population ranking ===
The population ranking of the following table is based on the 2010 census of Graham County.

† county seat

Rank	City/Town/etc.	Population (2010 Census)	Municipal type	Incorporated
1	† Safford	9,566	City	
2	Thatcher	4,865	Town	
3	Swift Trail Junction	2,935	CDP	
4	Pima	2,387	Town	
5	Bylas	1,962	CDP	
6	Cactus Flats	1,518	CDP	
7	Peridot (Partially in Gila County)	1,350	CDP	
8	Central	645	CDP	
9	San Jose	506	CDP	
10	Solomon	426	CDP	
11	Fort Thomas	374	CDP	
12	Bryce	175	CDP	

== Notable people ==
- Charles Stevens, Apache/Mexican actor
- Lynda Carter, actress/singer
- Charles Dudley (né Heaslip) born Fort Grant, film actor and make-up artist
- Sarah Yeiser Mason, Academy Award-winning screenwriter
- Spencer W. Kimball, former President of The Church of Jesus Christ of Latter-day Saints, was raised in Thatcher, and lived and operated a business in Safford between 1927 and 1943.

== See also ==
- Frye Mesa Reservoir
- National Register of Historic Places listings in Graham County, Arizona
- USS Graham County (LST-1176)
- Graham County Sheriff's Office
