= 1960 United States presidential election in Arizona =

- November 8, 1960

Nominee	Richard Nixon	John F. Kennedy
Party	Republican	Democratic
Home state	California	Massachusetts
Running mate	Henry Cabot Lodge Jr.	Lyndon B. Johnson
Electoral vote	4	0
Popular vote	221,241	176,781
Percentage	55.52%	44.36%

County results
Nixon
50–60%
60–70%
Kennedy
50–60%
60–70%
President before election
Dwight D. Eisenhower
Republican
Elected President
John F. Kennedy
Democratic

The 1960 United States presidential election in Arizona took place on November 8, 1960, as part of the 1960 United States presidential election. State voters chose four representatives, or electors, to the Electoral College, who voted for president and vice president.

Arizona was won by incumbent Vice President Richard Nixon (R–California), running with United States Ambassador to the United Nations Henry Cabot Lodge Jr., with 55.5% of the popular vote, against Senator John F. Kennedy (D–Massachusetts), running with Senator Lyndon B. Johnson, with 44.4% of the popular vote.

This was the first time since achieving statehood in 1912 that Arizona backed the losing candidate in a presidential election, a sign that the state was trending Republican. It would vote Republican in every election thereafter except 1996 and 2020. Kennedy became the first ever Democrat to win the White House without carrying Arizona since it became a state, as well as the first to do so without carrying Apache, Cochise, Coconino, Graham, Maricopa, Mohave, Navajo, or Yavapai Counties, and the first since Woodrow Wilson in 1916 to do so without carrying Pima County. As well as this, Arizona is the only state in the union that backed the Republican candidate in the 1960, 1964, and 1968 elections.

== Primaries ==
=== Democratic state convention ===
While Arizona did not hold a formal primary to select delegates to represent the state at the Democratic National Convention, it did hold a state convention in April where delegates were selected.

Since Arizona traditionally operated under the "unit role" at conventions (under which the entire delegation voted for one candidate as a unified bloc), a candidate who could secure a simple majority of their delegation's support would be able to receive the votes of all 17 delegates.

By early 1959, Kennedy's campaign saw strong potential in the state, and recognized a need to organize their efforts there. Arizona was added to the list of states which they began to prioritize as targets for Kennedy to compete in during the primaries. As the primary season unfolded, Kennedy increasingly recognized the state convention as an opportunity to secure delegates in advance of the convention. This arose as an opportunity for Kennedy due to Lyndon B. Johnson's steadfast refusal to launch an active candidacy during the primaries. Rather than seeking support as a declared candidate, Johnson was relying on a covert, ultimately ineffective, effort to deliver him the support of Arizona's delegation. Johnson was counting on 81 year old senator Carl Hayden and former senator Ernest McFarland to deliver him the state's delegation. Both would ultimately prove to have long since expended their political capital in the state.

Kennedy operative Ted Sorensen found, early on, that the state party chairman, Tucson mayor Don Hummel, was willing to help the Kennedy campaign. Kennedy's campaign's primary base for their Arizona operations was in Pima County, where Hummel lent his grassroots prowess to them.

The primary actor in shoring up Kennedy's support in the state, however, was congressman Stewart Udall. Both Udall and his prover, former county prosecutor Mo Udall, proved themselves to be committed supporters of Kennedy's campaign. A few days prior to the state convention, Sam Rayburn (a Johnson ally) summoned Stewart Udall to the Speaker's Platform in the House Chamber of the United States Capitol. He inquired as to whether Udall was going to be an active figure in the state convention, which Udall confirmed that he would be. Rayburn responded sternly, "Well, I have a candidate for the nomination, my colleague from Texas. I don't want you to hurt him." Udall attempted to placate Rayburn by saying, "Mr. Speaker, I am not trying to hurt anybody. I committed myself several months ago to John Kennedy, and I am going to do everything I can to help him. I am not trying to hurt your man. As a matter of fact, if Kennedy can't get the support, your man is obviously the man who will. If I can't put Kennedy over, I'm not going against him."

After a string of hostile caucuses to select delegates, the state convention ultimately produced a delegation that favored Kennedy (with two-thirds of the delegates being Kennedy supporters).

== Results ==
1960 United States presidential election in Arizona
Party	Candidate	Votes	%
Republican	Richard Nixon	221,241	55.52%
Democratic	John F. Kennedy	176,781	44.36%
Socialist Labor	Eric Hass	469	0.12%
Majority		44,460	11.16%
Total votes		398,491	100.00%

=== Results by county ===
County	Richard Nixon Republican		John F. Kennedy Democratic		Eric Hass Socialist Labor		Margin		Total votes cast
County	#	%	#	%	#	%	#	%	Total votes cast
Apache	1,568	51.75%	1,459	48.15%	3	0.10%	109	3.60%	3,030
Cochise	7,572	50.46%	7,419	49.44%	16	0.10%	153	1.02%	15,007
Coconino	4,870	54.45%	4,065	45.45%	9	0.10%	805	9.00%	8,944
Gila	3,806	41.99%	5,251	57.93%	8	0.08%	-1,445	-15.94%	9,065
Graham	2,491	54.35%	2,091	45.63%	1	0.02%	400	8.72%	4,583
Greenlee	1,313	29.94%	3,069	69.97%	4	0.09%	-1,756	-40.03%	4,386
Maricopa	127,090	59.37%	86,834	40.57%	135	0.06%	40,256	18.80%	214,059
Mohave	1,641	55.59%	1,303	44.14%	8	0.27%	338	11.45%	2,952
Navajo	4,090	57.19%	3,052	42.68%	9	0.13%	1,038	14.51%	7,151
Pima	46,734	52.43%	42,171	47.31%	239	0.26%	4,563	5.12%	89,144
Pinal	6,441	47.07%	7,232	52.85%	11	0.08%	-791	-5.78%	13,684
Santa Cruz	1,265	40.35%	1,868	59.59%	2	0.06%	-603	-19.24%	3,135
Yavapai	6,813	61.12%	4,325	38.80%	9	0.08%	2,488	22.32%	11,147
Yuma	5,547	45.45%	6,642	54.42%	15	0.13%	-1,095	-8.97%	12,204
Totals	221,241	55.52%	176,781	44.36%	469	0.12%	44,460	11.16%	398,491

==== Counties that flipped from Republican to Democratic ====
- Gila
- Pinal
- Santa Cruz

== Electors ==
Electors were chosen by their party's voters in primary elections held on September 13, 1960.

John F. Kennedy & Lyndon B. Johnson Democratic Party	Richard Nixon & Henry Cabot Lodge Jr. Republican Party	Eric Hass & Georgia Cozzini Socialist Labor Party
Thomas J. Croaff Jr.; Daniel Edward Garvey; Ernest W. McFarland; Rawghlie C. Stanford	Elizabeth Ann Parkman; Barnett E. Marks; Margaret A. Rockwell; E. I. Whiting	George Horvath; Wrignol E. Quillen; William M. Reynolds; Pauline Reynolds
