= 1916 United States presidential election in Arizona =

- November 7, 1916

All 3 Arizona votes to the Electoral College

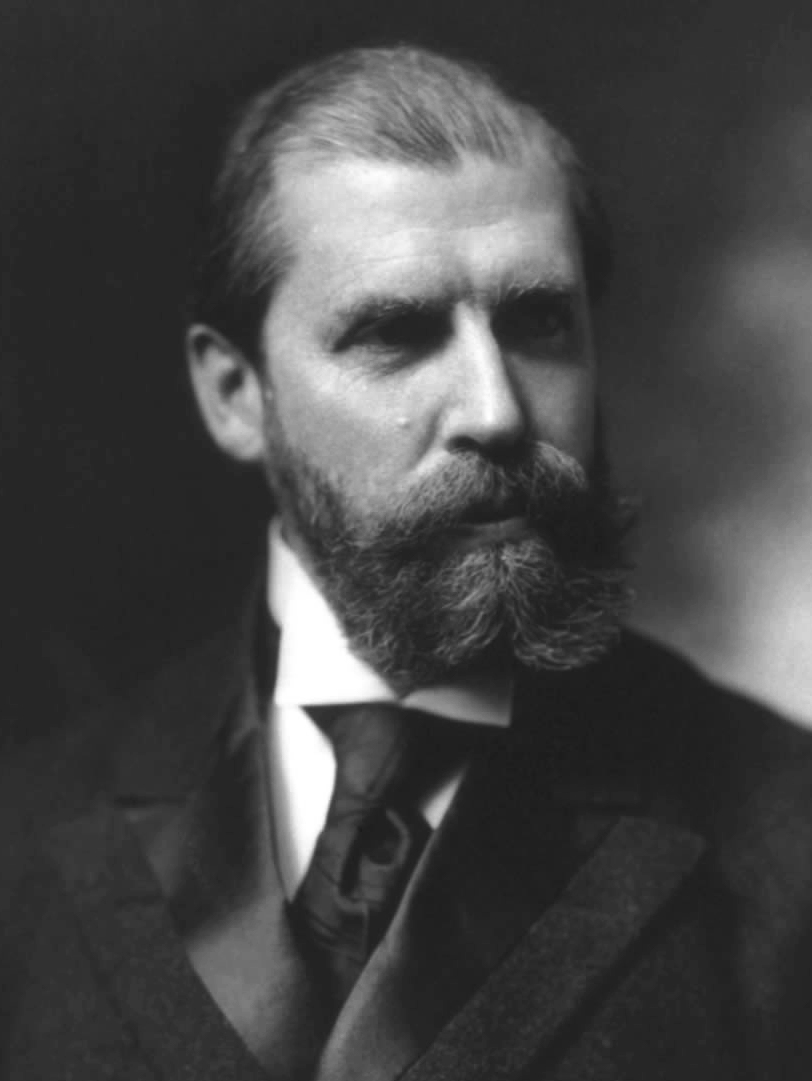

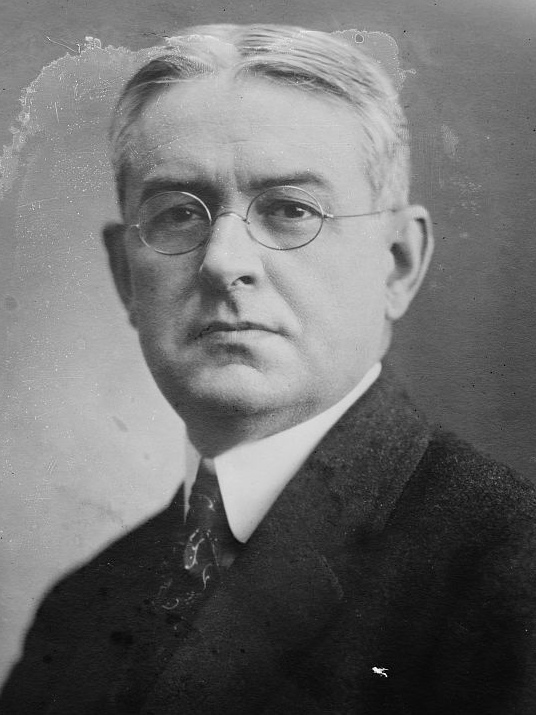
Nominee	Woodrow Wilson	Charles E. Hughes	Allan L. Benson
Party	Democratic	Republican	Socialist
Home state	New Jersey	New York	New York
Running mate	Thomas R. Marshall	Charles W. Fairbanks	George Ross Kirkpatrick
Electoral vote	3	0	0
Popular vote	33,170	20,524	3,174
Percentage	57.17%	35.37%	5.47%
County results
Wilson
50–60%
60–70%
70–80%
Hughes
50–60%
President before election
Woodrow Wilson
Democratic
Elected President
Woodrow Wilson
Democratic

The 1916 United States presidential election in Arizona took place on November 7, 1916, as part of the 1916 United States presidential election. State voters chose three representatives, or electors, to the Electoral College, who voted for president and vice president.

Arizona was won by Democratic incumbent President Woodrow Wilson, running with incumbent Vice President Thomas R. Marshall, with 57.17% of the popular vote, against Republican Associate Justice of the U.S. Supreme Court Charles Evans Hughes, running with former Vice President Charles W. Fairbanks under Theodore Roosevelt's second term, with 35.37% of the popular vote. Socialist nominee Allan L. Benson ran with George Ross Kirkpatrick, finishing in a distant third place with just 5.47%, a significant decrease from 13.33% in 1912.

Despite Republican hopes of unifying the party after a catastrophic split four years prior, Democrat Woodrow Wilson was still able to win a solid majority (57.17%) improving on his 43.5% vote in 1912. Many Arizonans who voted for left wing Socialist candidate Eugene V. Debs in their first presidential election sided with progressive Democratic President Wilson for re-election over Republican nominee Charles E. Hughes who ran as a moderate in hopes of unifying the progressive wing that had earlier split from the party by former President Theodore Roosevelt and the conservative faction led by former President William Howard Taft.

Woodrow Wilson won every county in Arizona by a landslide except for Pima County which voted for him by one of the smallest percentages in 1912. Hughes was the only losing Republican to carry any of Arizona's counties until Richard Nixon in 1960.

This was the last election where voters in Arizona chose presidential electors directly; Arizona adopted the modern "short ballot" for the 1920 election.

== Results ==
General Election Results
Party	Pledged to	Elector	Votes
Democratic Party	Woodrow Wilson	Lamar Cobb	33,170
Democratic Party	Woodrow Wilson	Homer R. Wood	33,157
Democratic Party	Woodrow Wilson	Harry E. Pickett	33,150
Republican Party	Charles Evans Hughes	J. L. Hubbell	20,524
Republican Party	Charles Evans Hughes	W. W. Cook	20,522
Republican Party	Charles Evans Hughes	John C. Greenway	20,520
Socialist Party	Allan L. Benson	Beverly Blunt	3,174
Socialist Party	Allan L. Benson	James E. Pawley	3,172
Socialist Party	Allan L. Benson	T. C. Pruett	3,172
Prohibition Party	Frank Hanly	Eugene W. Chafin	1,153
Prohibition Party	Frank Hanly	J. Stanley Howard	1,148
Prohibition Party	Frank Hanly	O. Gibson	1,145
Votes cast (Note: Based on totals for highest elector on each ticket)			58,021

=== Results by county ===
County	Woodrow Wilson Democratic		Charles Evans Hughes Republican		Allan L. Benson Socialist		Frank Hanly Prohibition		Margin		Total votes cast
County	#	%	#	%	#	%	#	%	#	%	Total votes cast
Apache	648	66.12%	311	31.73%	16	1.63%	5	0.51%	337	34.39%	980
Cochise	6,115	60.35%	3,203	31.61%	694	6.85%	120	1.18%	2,912	28.74%	10,132
Coconino	1,171	56.52%	802	38.71%	77	3.72%	22	1.06%	369	17.81%	2,072
Gila	3,686	64.29%	1,495	26.08%	510	8.90%	42	0.73%	2,191	38.22%	5,733
Graham	1,597	70.76%	497	22.02%	119	5.27%	44	1.95%	1,100	48.74%	2,257
Greenlee	1,492	63.92%	672	28.79%	156	6.68%	14	0.60%	820	35.13%	2,334
Maricopa	7,634	52.14%	5,747	39.26%	574	3.92%	685	4.68%	1,887	12.89%	14,640
Mohave	1,335	59.97%	643	28.89%	243	10.92%	5	0.22%	692	31.09%	2,226
Navajo	1,240	65.92%	574	30.52%	25	1.33%	42	2.23%	666	35.41%	1,881
Pima	2,079	42.24%	2,616	53.15%	150	3.05%	77	1.56%	-537	-10.91%	4,922
Pinal	1,232	56.54%	855	39.24%	60	2.75%	32	1.47%	377	17.30%	2,179
Santa Cruz	726	50.35%	666	46.19%	42	2.91%	8	0.55%	60	4.16%	1,442
Yavapai	2,893	58.06%	1,716	34.44%	331	6.64%	43	0.86%	1,177	23.62%	4,983
Yuma	1,322	59.02%	727	32.46%	177	7.90%	14	0.63%	595	26.56%	2,240
Totals	33,170	57.17%	20,524	35.37%	3,174	5.47%	1,153	1.99%	12,646	21.80%	58,021

==== Counties that flipped from Democratic to Republican ====
- Pima
