= 2000 United States presidential election in Arizona =

- November 7, 2000

| Nominee | George W. Bush | Al Gore |
| Party | Republican | Democratic |
| Home state | Texas | Tennessee |
| Running mate | Dick Cheney | Joe Lieberman |
| Electoral vote | 8 | 0 |
| Popular vote | 781,652 | 685,341 |
| Percentage | 50.95% | 44.67% |

Bush
40–50%
50–60%
60–70%
Gore
40–50%
50–60%
60–70%
President before election
Bill Clinton
Democratic
Elected President
George W. Bush
Republican

The 2000 United States presidential election in Arizona took place on November 7, 2000, and was part of the 2000 United States presidential election. Voters chose eight representatives, or electors to the Electoral College, who voted for president and vice president.

Arizona was won by Governor George W. Bush by a 6.3 point margin of victory. Ralph Nader received 3%, whilst all of the other candidates received a combined 1%. Pre-election polling showed that Bush had a solid lead over Gore. Bush won all the congressional districts, except Arizona's 2nd congressional district. The key for Bush's victory was Maricopa County, which has by far the highest population in the state. After breaking the longest Republican streak in the last election, last voting Democratic in 1948 prior to 1996, Arizona made a return to the Republican column in 2000. Bush made history by winning Greenlee County, the first Republican presidential candidate to ever do so. This thinly populated working class county, which has been dependent on copper mining as the basis for its economy, had previously voted Democratic in every election since Arizona achieved statehood in 1912, but has not done so since.

Bush became the first Republican to win the White House without carrying Coconino or Pima Counties since Arizona statehood, as well as the first to do so without carrying Santa Cruz County since Herbert Hoover in 1928.

== General election ==
=== Polling ===
| Poll source | Date(s) | Sample size | Margin of error | George W. Bush (R) | Al Gore (D) | Ralph Nader (G) | Other / undecided (Note: Calculated by taking the difference of 100% and all other listed candidates combined. For polls that do not report a figure for Nader, this includes his support.) |
|---|---|---|---|---|---|---|---|
| Harris Insights & Analytics | November 3, 2000 | 4,656 | — | 52% | 40% | 5% | 3% |
| Market Solutions Group | October 30, 2000 | 432 | — | 49% | 39% | 3% | 9% |
| SurveyUSA | October 30, 2000 | 510 | — | 52% | 42% | — | 6% |
| Arizona State University Morrison Institute for Public Policy | October 21, 2000 | 600 (Note: Sample size unavailable; 600 is a default estimate used in the source dataset.) | — | 49% | 39% | 3% | 9% |
| Rasmussen Reports | October 21, 2000 | 610 | — | 49% | 37% | — | 14% |

=== Results ===
2000 United States presidential election in Arizona
| Party | Candidate | Votes | Percentage | Electoral votes |
|---|---|---|---|---|
| Republican | George W. Bush | 781,652 | 51.0% | 8 |
| Democratic | Al Gore | 685,341 | 44.7% | 0 |
| Green | Ralph Nader | 45,645 | 3.0% | 0 |
| Reform | Patrick Buchanan | 12,373 | 0.8% | 0 |
| Libertarian | L. Neil Smith | 5,775 | 0.4% | 0 |
| Write-ins | Various candidates | 2,097 | 0.1% | 0 |
| Natural Law | John Hagelin | 1,120 | 0.1% | 0 |
| Constitution | Howard Phillips | 110 | 0.0% | 0 |
| Totals | | 1,534,113 | 100.0% | 8 |
| Voter turnout | | | | 40% |

==== By county ====
| County | George W. Bush Republican | | Al Gore Democratic | | Various candidates Other parties | | Margin | | Total votes cast |
| County | # | % | # | % | # | % | # | % | Total votes cast |
|---|---|---|---|---|---|---|---|---|---|
| Apache | 5,947 | 30.57% | 13,025 | 66.95% | 484 | 2.48% | -7,078 | -36.38% | 19,456 |
| Cochise | 18,180 | 54.69% | 13,360 | 40.19% | 1,701 | 5.12% | 4,820 | 14.50% | 33,241 |
| Coconino | 17,562 | 42.96% | 20,280 | 49.60% | 3,041 | 7.44% | -2,718 | -6.64% | 40,883 |
| Gila | 9,158 | 51.64% | 7,700 | 43.41% | 878 | 4.95% | 1,458 | 8.23% | 17,736 |
| Graham | 6,007 | 62.16% | 3,355 | 34.73% | 302 | 3.12% | 2,652 | 27.43% | 9,664 |
| Greenlee | 1,619 | 54.70% | 1,216 | 41.08% | 125 | 4.22% | 403 | 13.62% | 2,960 |
| La Paz | 2,543 | 56.73% | 1,769 | 39.46% | 171 | 3.81% | 774 | 17.27% | 4,483 |
| Maricopa | 479,967 | 53.23% | 386,683 | 42.88% | 35,049 | 3.89% | 93,284 | 10.35% | 901,699 |
| Mohave | 24,386 | 55.25% | 17,470 | 39.58% | 2,285 | 5.17% | 6,916 | 15.67% | 44,141 |
| Navajo | 12,386 | 49.25% | 11,794 | 46.90% | 967 | 3.85% | 592 | 2.35% | 25,147 |
| Pima | 124,579 | 43.31% | 147,688 | 51.34% | 15,373 | 5.35% | -23,109 | -8.03% | 287,640 |
| Pinal | 20,122 | 48.73% | 19,650 | 47.59% | 1,518 | 3.68% | 472 | 1.14% | 41,290 |
| Santa Cruz | 3,344 | 37.60% | 5,233 | 58.84% | 316 | 3.56% | -1,889 | -21.24% | 8,893 |
| Yavapai | 40,144 | 58.84% | 24,063 | 35.27% | 4,021 | 5.89% | 16,081 | 23.57% | 68,228 |
| Yuma | 15,708 | 54.82% | 12,055 | 42.07% | 889 | 3.11% | 3,653 | 12.75% | 28,652 |
| Total | 781,652 | 50.95% | 685,341 | 44.67% | 67,120 | 4.38% | 96,311 | 6.28% | 1,534,113 |

Counties that flipped from Democratic to Republican

- Gila (Largest city: Payson)
- Greenlee (Largest city: Clifton)
- La Paz (Largest city: Parker)
- Navajo (Largest city: Show Low)
- Pinal (Largest city: San Tan Valley)
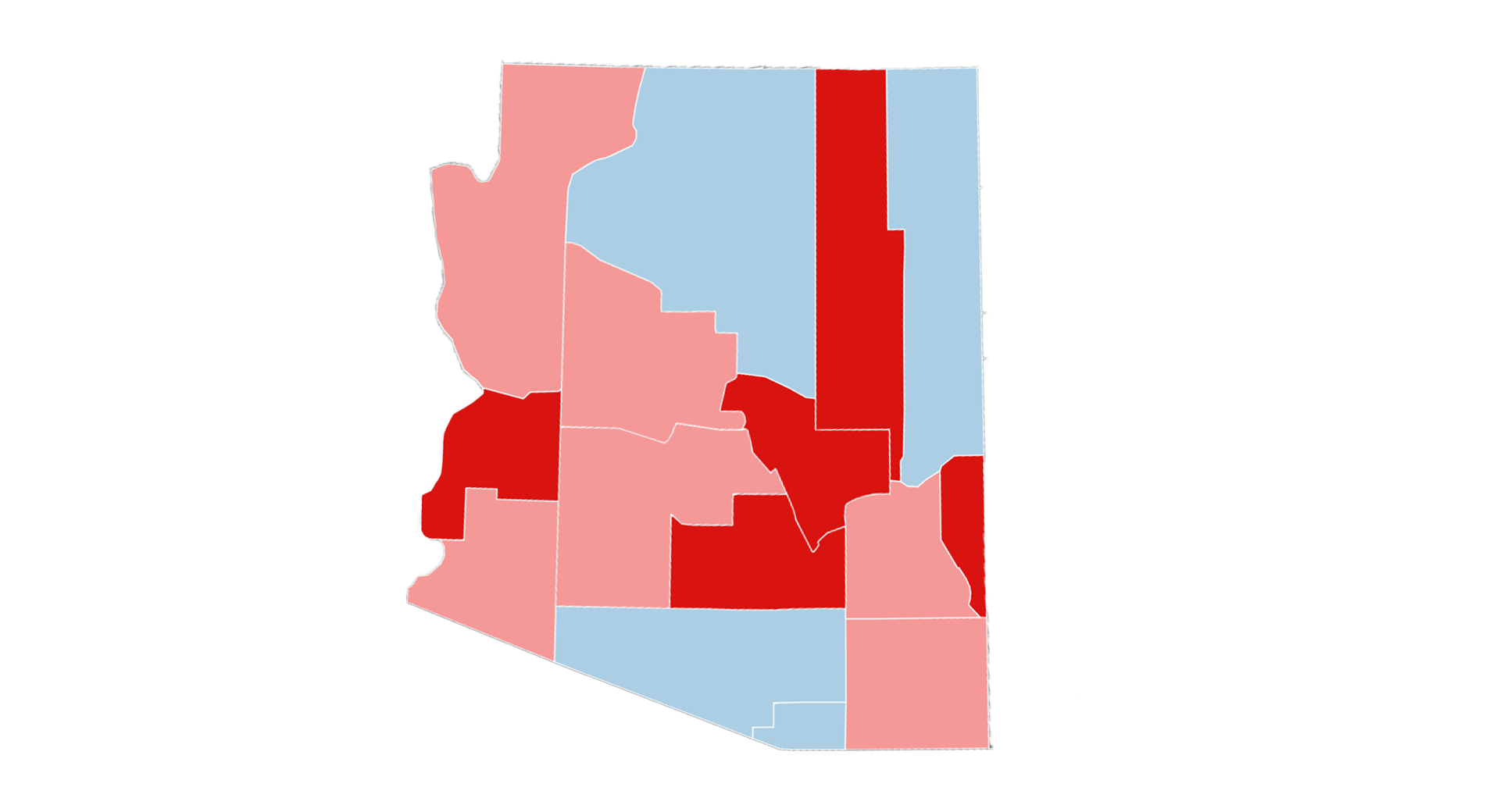

==== By congressional district ====
Bush won five of six congressional districts.

| District | Bush | Gore | Representative |
|---|---|---|---|
| 1st | 51% | 44% | Matt Salmon |
| 1st | 51% | 44% | Jeff Flake |
| 2nd | 34% | 62% | Ed Pastor |
| 3rd | 56% | 40% | Bob Stump |
| 4th | 52% | 44% | John Shadegg |
| 5th | 49% | 46% | Jim Kolbe |
| 6th | 54% | 42% | J.D. Hayworth |

== Electors ==
Technically the voters of Arizona cast their ballots for electors: representatives to the Electoral College. Arizona is allocated eight electors because it has 6 congressional districts and 2 senators. All candidates who appear on the ballot or qualify to receive write-in votes must submit a list of 8 electors, who pledge to vote for their candidate and their running mate. Whoever wins the majority of votes in the state is awarded all 8 electoral votes. Their chosen electors then vote for president and vice president. Although electors are pledged to their candidate and running mate, they are not obligated to vote for them. An elector who votes for someone other than their candidate is known as a faithless elector.

The electors of each state and the District of Columbia met on December 18, 2000 to cast their votes for president and vice president. The Electoral College itself never meets as one body. Instead the electors from each state and the District of Columbia met in their respective capitols.

The following were the members of the Electoral College from the state. All were pledged to and voted for George W. Bush and Dick Cheney:

1. Joe Arpaio
2. Linda Barber
3. Dennis Booth
4. Webb Crockett
5. Paul Robert Fannin
6. LaVelle McCoy
7. Susan Minnaugh
8. Frank Straka
