= 1996 United States presidential election in Arizona =

- November 5, 1996

Nominee	Bill Clinton	Bob Dole	Ross Perot
Party	Democratic	Republican	Reform
Home state	Arkansas	Kansas	Texas
Running mate	Al Gore	Jack Kemp	Pat Choate
Electoral vote	8	0	0
Popular vote	653,288	622,073	112,072
Percentage	46.52%	44.29%	7.98%

Clinton
40–50%
50–60%
60–70%
Dole
40–50%
50–60%
President before election
Bill Clinton
Democratic
Elected President
Bill Clinton
Democratic

The 1996 United States presidential election in Arizona took place on November 5, 1996, as part of the 1996 United States presidential election. Voters chose eight representatives, or electors to the Electoral College, who voted for president and vice president. Arizona was won by President Bill Clinton (D) over Senator Bob Dole (R-KS), with Clinton winning 46.5% to 44.3% by a margin of 2.2%.

Clinton had come fairly close to winning Arizona four years earlier. In his re-election bid, he was able to gain a larger share of the vote in Democratic-trending Pima County as well as most of northern Arizona. He also increased his support in Maricopa County, although it was again carried by the Republican candidate. His statewide margin of victory was slightly over 31,000 votes out of about 1.4 million cast. Billionaire businessman Ross Perot (Reform-TX) finished in third, with 8.0% of the popular vote. Exit polls suggest he did not change the outcome. As of 2024, this is the last election in which the following counties have voted for a Democratic presidential candidate: Gila, Greenlee, Navajo, Pinal and La Paz.

This is the last election in which Arizona would vote differently from Georgia, as both had Republican winning streaks from 2000 to 2016 before flipping simultaneously in 2020 and 2024.

This is the only presidential election in Arizona's history in which Maricopa County, containing more than half of Arizona's population, voted for a candidate that lost the state, and one of only two elections in which Yavapai County, home to the city of Prescott, did so. This was the first time a Democrat had won Arizona in a presidential election since 1948, and the last time until 2020. This is also the only presidential election since 1944 in which Arizona voted Democratic while Colorado voted Republican, and the only presidential election since 1980 in which Arizona voted to the left of Nevada.

47% of white voters supported Dole, while 43% supported Clinton. 8% supported Perot.

== Primary elections ==
=== Democratic primary ===
The Arizona Democratic primary was held on February 27, 1996, as one of the Democratic Party's statewide nomination contests ahead of the 1996 United States presidential election.

Incumbent President Bill Clinton won the primary in a landslide.

=== Republican primary ===
Republican primary county results Forbes: 30–40% Dole: 20–30% 30–40% 40–50% Buchanan: 20–30% 30–40% 40–50%

The Arizona Republican primary was held on February 27, 1996, as one of the Republican Party's statewide nomination contests ahead of the 1996 United States presidential election. Publisher and Forbes magazine executive Steve Forbes defeated Bob Dole, Pat Buchanan, and Lamar Alexander in a close primary.

The Arizona contest was one of several Republican primaries held on February 27, 1996, alongside contests in North Dakota and South Dakota.

Forbes ultimately carried Arizona by a margin of 3.8%–credited to Maricopa County–making it one of only two states he won during the 1996 Republican primaries (the other being Delaware).

1996 Arizona Republican Presidential Primary
Candidate	Votes	%	Delegates
Steve Forbes	115,962	33.37%	14
Bob Dole	102,980	29.64%	12
Pat Buchanan	95,742	27.55%	12
Lamar Alexander	24,765	7.13%	0
Alan Keyes	2,790	0.80%	0
Richard Lugar	2,064	0.59%	0
Phil Gramm (withdrawn)	857	0.25%	0
Bob Dornan	735	0.21%	0
Others	1,587	0.46%	0
Total	347,482	100.00%	38

== Results ==
1996 United States presidential election in Arizona
Party	Candidate	Running mate	Votes	Percentage	Electoral votes
Democratic	Bill Clinton (incumbent)	Al Gore (incumbent)	653,288	46.52%	8
Republican	Robert Dole	Jack Kemp	622,073	44.29%	0
Reform	Ross Perot	Patrick Choate	112,072	7.98%	0
Libertarian	Harry Browne	Jo Jorgensen	14,358	1.02%	0
Green	Ralph Nader (write-in)	Winona LaDuke	2,062	0.15%	0
U.S. Taxpayers'	Howard Phillips (write-in)	(Note: Phillips' running mate on the national US Taxpayers ticket was Herbert Titus, but in Arizona, Phillips was listed without a running mate as a write-in candidate.)	347	0.02%	0
Natural Law	John Hagelin (write-in)	Mike Tompkins	153	0.01%	0
No Party	Charles Collins (write-in)	Rosemary Giumarra	36	0.00%	0
Maverick Democratic	Caroline Killeen (write-in)	William F. Buckley Jr.	16	0.00%	0
No Party	Robert B. Winn (write-in)		5	0.00%	0
Totals			1,404,405	100.00%	8

=== By county ===
County	Bill Clinton Democratic		Bob Dole Republican		Ross Perot Reform		Harry Browne Libertarian		Various candidates Other parties		Margin		Total votes cast
County	#	%	#	%	#	%	#	%	#	%	#	%	Total votes cast
Apache	12,394	66.33%	4,761	25.48%	1,296	6.94%	204	1.09%	29	0.16%	7,633	40.85%	18,684
Cochise	13,782	43.17%	14,365	45.00%	3,346	10.48%	383	1.20%	47	0.15%	-583	-1.83%	31,923
Coconino	20,475	53.15%	13,638	35.40%	3,666	9.52%	609	1.58%	137	0.35%	6,837	17.75%	38,522
Gila	8,577	49.26%	6,407	36.80%	2,211	12.70%	204	1.17%	12	0.07%	2,170	12.46%	17,411
Graham	3,938	42.36%	4,222	45.42%	1,034	11.12%	100	1.08%	2	0.02%	-284	-3.06%	9,296
Greenlee	1,755	51.72%	1,159	34.16%	426	12.56%	53	1.56%	0	0.00%	596	17.56%	3,393
La Paz	1,964	43.71%	1,902	42.33%	597	13.29%	30	0.67%	0	0.00%	62	1.38%	4,493
Maricopa	363,991	44.53%	386,015	47.22%	58,479	7.15%	7,551	0.92%	1,396	0.18%	-22,024	-2.69%	817,432
Mohave	16,629	40.04%	17,997	43.33%	6,369	15.33%	481	1.16%	57	0.14%	-1,368	-3.29%	41,533
Navajo	12,912	51.78%	9,262	37.14%	2,461	9.87%	272	1.09%	31	0.12%	3,650	14.64%	24,938
Pima	137,983	52.16%	104,121	39.36%	18,809	7.11%	2,894	1.09%	745	0.28%	33,862	12.80%	264,552
Pinal	19,579	53.07%	13,034	35.33%	3,972	10.77%	293	0.79%	17	0.04%	6,545	17.74%	36,895
Santa Cruz	5,241	64.17%	2,256	27.62%	600	7.35%	65	0.80%	5	0.06%	2,985	36.55%	8,167
Yavapai	21,801	36.64%	29,921	50.29%	6,649	11.18%	1,009	1.70%	115	0.19%	-8,120	-13.65%	59,495
Yuma	12,267	44.33%	13,013	47.03%	2,157	7.80%	210	0.76%	24	0.08%	-746	-2.70%	27,671
Totals	653,288	46.52%	622,073	44.29%	112,072	7.98%	14,358	1.02%	2,614	0.19%	31,215	2.23%	1,404,405

Counties that flipped from Democratic to Republican

- Cochise
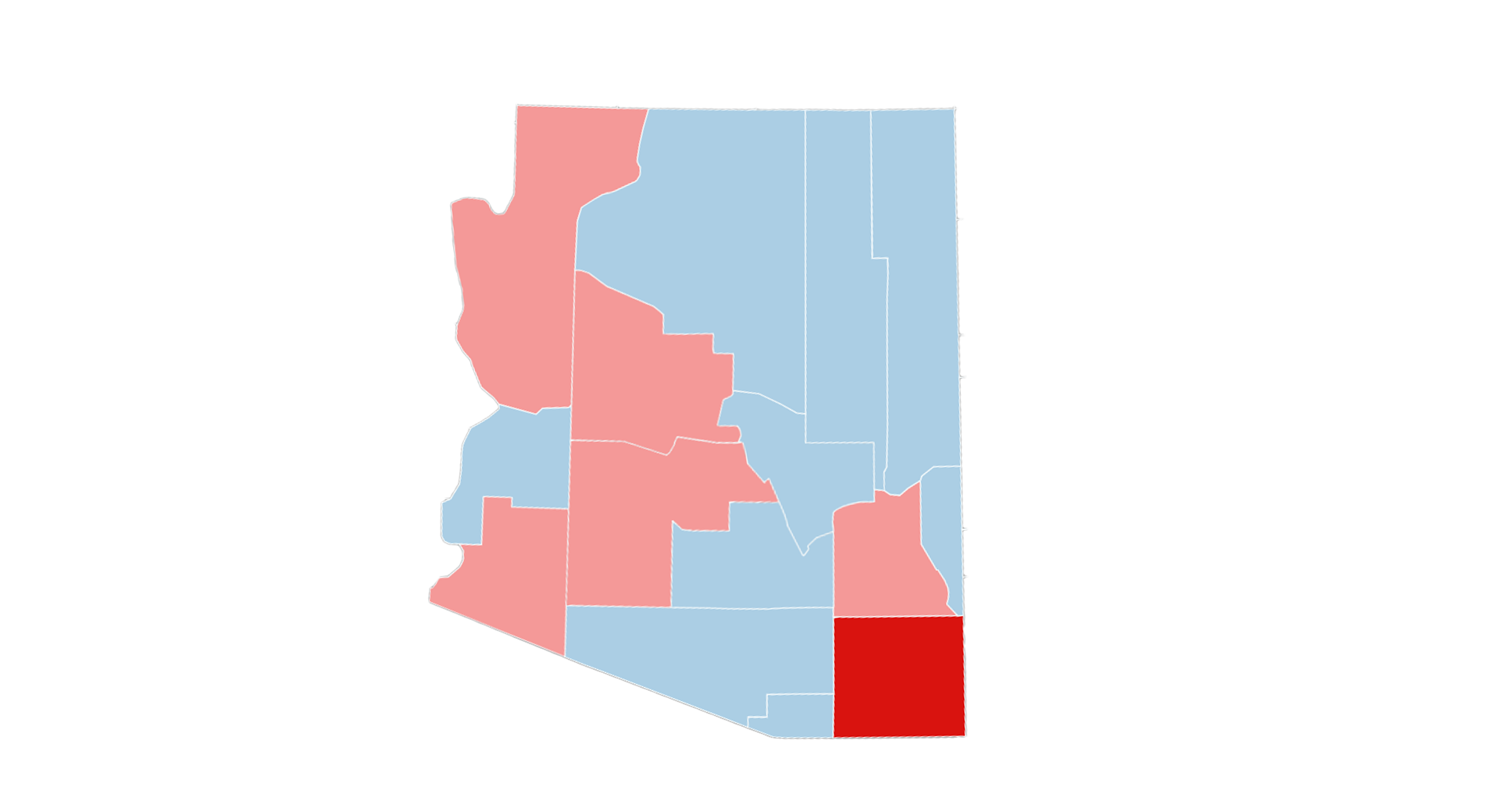

=== By congressional district ===
Clinton won three of six congressional districts, including two that elected Republicans.

District	Dole	Clinton	Perot	Representative
1st	47%	46%	7%	Matt Salmon
2nd	29%	64%	7%	Ed Pastor
3rd	48%	42%	10%	Bob Stump
4th	49%	44%	7%	John Shadegg
5th	44%	48%	8%	Jim Kolbe
6th	45%	47%	8%	J.D. Hayworth

== Electors ==
Bill Clinton & Al Gore Democratic Party	Bob Dole & Jack Kemp Republican Party	Ross Perot & Pat Choate Reform Party
Thomas Bean; Andrew S. Gordon; Rose Mofford; Scott Thomas Olson Sr.; Daniel R. Ortega Jr.; Jeanne M. Perpich; E. C. Rosenbaum; Mary V. Thomas	Linda Barber; Malcolm W. Barrett; Franklin Roy Dunton; Paul Robert Fannin; Donna Flanigan; William W. Goldsmith; Jack Londen; Kay Van Sant	Dean Clifton Bailey; James Edward Bourassa; Mary Martha Bourassa; James Wilbur Callis; Kathleen Durkin; Janice Kennedy; Eugene John Kerkman; Rosella Elaine Quinn

Harry Browne & Jo Jorgensen Libertarian Party	Ralph Nader & Winona LaDuke Green Party	Howard Phillips U.S. Taxpayers Party
Carolyn Campbell; Darlene Franklin; Alfred S. Fuller; Sloane Haywood; Donna Pulling; Timothy D. Shinabarger; Edward Allen Silk; Alva d'Orgeix	Shirly C. Bardella; Kelly Jarvis; Kenneth C. Kurtzhalz; William Stewart Norton; Joyce Oldfather; Joel Sullins; Marie Joan Yappel; Leonard Julius Zimont	Jan Cohn; Ted J. Goldstein; Deborah J. Goldstein; Kathleen Hansen; Keith Hansen; Sashi Jorden; James Romaine; Evelyn Romaine

John Hagelin & Mike Tompkins Natural Law Party	Charles Collins & Rosemary Giumarra Independent	Caroline Killeen & William F. Buckley Jr. Maverick Democratic	Robert B. Winn Independent
Mike Dugger; Barbara Elizabeth Grainger; Scott Grainger; Ernest Hancock; Donna Hancock; Kathy L. Harrer; Linda M. McDermott; Timothy P. McDermott	Tina Booher; Elizabeth Bovee; Carol N. Kruger; Leonard Pawlak; Mike Reeves; Carol A. Spoor; Bernard L. Weaver; Doreen Yonkmans	Kate Allan; Joseph Larsson; Brian McInerney; Don Rainwater; Lybrand Smith-Mayes; Alison Stout; Sherri Whitaker; Alec W. Young	Doyle Adair; Joyce Adair; Dean A. Brinkerhoff; Natalie V. Gregg; Sherry Lynn Gruwell; Dixie L. Holmes; Arthur W. Parker; George L. Sheppard
