= 1988 United States presidential election in Arizona =

- November 8, 1988

Nominee	George H. W. Bush	Michael Dukakis
Party	Republican	Democratic
Home state	Texas	Massachusetts
Running mate	Dan Quayle	Lloyd Bentsen
Electoral vote	7	0
Popular vote	702,541	454,029
Percentage	59.95%	38.74%
County results
Bush
40–50%
50–60%
60–70%
Dukakis
50–60%
60–70%
President before election
Ronald Reagan
Republican
Elected President
George H. W. Bush
Republican

The 1988 United States presidential election in Arizona took place on November 8, 1988. All fifty states and the District of Columbia, were part of the 1988 United States presidential election. State voters chose seven electors to the Electoral College, which selected the president and vice president.

Arizona was won by incumbent United States Vice President George H. W. Bush of Texas, who was running against Massachusetts Governor Michael Dukakis. Bush ran with Indiana Senator Dan Quayle as Vice President, and Dukakis ran with Texas Senator Lloyd Bentsen.

Arizona weighed in for this election as 14 points more Republican than the national average. The presidential election of 1988 was a very partisan election for Arizona, with nearly 99% of the electorate voting for either the Democratic or Republican parties. Nearly every county turned out for Bush, with the exception of Native American Apache County and heavily unionized Greenlee County voting primarily for Dukakis.

As of the 2024 presidential election, this is the last occasion when the counties of Coconino, Pima and Santa Cruz have voted for the Republican presidential candidate.

Bush won the election in the traditionally conservative and Republican state of Arizona with a solid 21-point margin.

== General election ==
=== Predictions ===
Source	Rating	As of
The Cook Political Report	Solid R	September 24, 1988

=== Results ===
1988 United States presidential election in Arizona
Party	Candidate	Votes	Percentage	Electoral votes
Republican	George H. W. Bush	702,541	59.95%	7
Democratic	Michael Dukakis	454,029	38.74%	0
Libertarian	Ron Paul	13,351	1.14%	0
New Alliance Party	Lenora Fulani	1,662	0.14%	0
Independent	Eugene McCarthy (write-in)	159	0.01%	0
Populist	David Duke (write-in)	113	0.01%	0
American	Delmar Dennis (write-in)	18	0.00%	0
Totals		1,171,873	100.00%	7

=== Results by county ===
County	George H.W. Bush Republican		Michael Dukakis Democratic		Ron Paul Libertarian		Lenora Fulani New Alliance		Various candidates Other parties		Margin		Total votes cast
County	#	%	#	%	#	%	#	%	#	%	#	%	Total votes cast
Apache	5,347	36.76%	8,944	61.50%	224	1.54%	26	0.18%	3	0.02%	-3,597	-24.74%	14,544
Cochise	15,815	56.38%	11,812	42.11%	362	1.29%	49	0.17%	12	0.04%	4,003	14.27%	28,050
Coconino	16,649	51.80%	14,660	45.61%	757	2.36%	56	0.17%	18	0.06%	1,989	6.19%	32,140
Gila	7,861	51.38%	7,147	46.72%	254	1.66%	35	0.23%	2	0.01%	714	4.66%	15,299
Graham	5,120	59.18%	3,407	39.38%	97	1.12%	24	0.28%	4	0.05%	1,713	19.80%	8,652
Greenlee	1,526	46.21%	1,733	52.48%	37	1.12%	6	0.18%	0	0.00%	-207	-6.27%	3,302
La Paz	2,562	58.55%	1,746	39.90%	62	1.42%	6	0.14%	0	0.00%	816	18.65%	4,376
Maricopa	442,337	64.90%	230,952	33.89%	7,199	1.06%	885	0.13%	145	0.02%	211,385	31.01%	681,518
Mohave	17,651	62.40%	10,197	36.05%	381	1.35%	33	0.12%	24	0.08%	7,454	26.35%	28,286
Navajo	10,393	52.82%	9,023	45.86%	217	1.10%	42	0.21%	2	0.01%	1,370	6.96%	19,677
Pima	117,899	50.28%	113,824	48.54%	2,393	1.02%	314	0.13%	43	0.02%	4,075	1.74%	234,473
Pinal	14,966	51.29%	13,850	47.46%	318	1.09%	41	0.14%	5	0.02%	1,116	3.83%	29,180
Santa Cruz	3,320	49.63%	3,268	48.85%	89	1.33%	13	0.19%	0	0.00%	52	0.78%	6,690
Yavapai	27,842	64.44%	14,514	33.59%	733	1.70%	97	0.22%	20	0.05%	13,328	30.85%	43,206
Yuma	13,253	58.95%	8,952	39.82%	228	1.01%	35	0.16%	12	0.05%	4,301	19.13%	22,480
Totals	702,541	59.95%	454,029	38.74%	13,351	1.14%	1,662	0.14%	290	0.02%	248,512	21.21%	1,171,873

=== Electors ===
Electors were chosen by their party's voters in primary elections held on September 13, 1988.

Michael Dukakis & Lloyd Bentsen Democratic Party	George H. W. Bush & Dan Quayle Republican Party	Ron Paul & Andre Marrou Libertarian Party	Lenora Fulani & Wynonia Burke New Alliance Party
Sharon L. Barry; Glenn Davis; Leroy Dyson; Gloria V. Furman; Milton T. Hagedorn; William E. Hegarty; Janet Napolitano	Joe Castillo; Betty Cline; Donald John Egan; Clara B. Emmett; Joan Heskett; Charles M. Lemon; Mary E. van Fredenberg	Robert R. Bulechek; Stephen Clark; Clara B. Davis; Kathy L. Harrer; Donald Markowski; Peter G. Schaerl; John E. Smith II	Wynonia Brewington Burke; Gregory LeVor Campbell; Joyce A. Hooker; Carolyn T. Lowery; Billie C. Mills; Thebe E. Monyamane; Curtis Dwight Treable II

Eugene McCarthy Independent	David Duke & Floyd Parker Populist Party	Delmar Dennis & Earl Jeppson American Party
Harold Edward Baranoff; Larry D. Campbell; Lorain Kadish; Barbara Gail McSpadden; Thomas Mudrick; John R. Wingo; Stockton M. Wingo	William Blau; Herman Boaz; Robert R. Carlson; Billy R. Chandler; Edna T. Gipson; Margaret E. Jones; James T. Simmons	Joann Church; Kenneth E. Church; Barbara L. McKissick; Ellen Marie Newman; Mitchell A. Newman; Raymond H. Solomon; Winona O. Solomon

== See also ==
- Presidency of George H. W. Bush
