= 1984 United States presidential election in Arizona =

- November 6, 1984

Nominee	Ronald Reagan	Walter Mondale
Party	Republican	Democratic
Home state	California	Minnesota
Running mate	George H. W. Bush	Geraldine Ferraro
Electoral vote	7	0
Popular vote	681,416	333,854
Percentage	66.42%	32.54%

Reagan
50–60%
60–70%
70–80%
Mondale
50–60%
President before election
Ronald Reagan
Republican
Elected President
Ronald Reagan
Republican

The 1984 United States presidential election in Arizona took place on November 6, 1984. All fifty states and the District of Columbia, were part of the 1984 United States presidential election. State voters chose seven electors to the Electoral College, which selected the President and Vice President of the United States. Arizona was won by incumbent United States President Ronald Reagan of California, who was running against former Vice President Walter Mondale of Minnesota. Reagan ran for a second time with incumbent Vice President and former C.I.A. Director George H. W. Bush of Texas, and Mondale ran with Representative Geraldine Ferraro of New York, the first major female candidate for the vice presidency.

The presidential election of 1984 was a very partisan election for Arizona, with just under 99% of the electorate voting for either the Democratic or Republican parties, and only four parties appearing on the ballot. Nearly every county in Arizona voted with majorities for Reagan, a particularly strong turnout even in this typically conservative-leaning state. Reagan's win in Arizona was largely the result of a lopsided 45% victory margin in Maricopa County, the state's most populated county and home to Phoenix. Mondale did best in predominantly Native American Apache County, which was typical of his gains vis-à-vis Jimmy Carter in Native American counties throughout the nation; Reagan thus became the first-ever Republican to win the White House without carrying this county. Mondale also won heavily unionized copper-mining Greenlee County; albeit his performance there was the worst by a Democrat since statehood.

Arizona weighed in for this election as sixteen points more Republican than the national average. Reagan won the election in Arizona with a decisive 34-point landslide. No Republican candidate has received as strong of support in the American West at large as Reagan did.

== Results ==
1984 United States presidential election in Arizona
Party	Candidate	Votes	Percentage	Electoral votes
Republican	Ronald Reagan (incumbent)	681,416	66.42%	7
Democratic	Walter Mondale	333,854	32.54%	0
Libertarian	David Bergland	10,585	1.03%	0
Independent	Larry Harmon (write-in)	21	0.00%	0
Citizen's Party	Sonia Johnson (write-in)	18	0.00%	0
Independent	Robert B. Winn (write-in)	3	0.00%	0
Totals		1,025,897	100.00%	7

=== Results by county ===
County	Ronald Reagan Republican		Walter Mondale Democratic		David Bergland Libertarian		Various candidates Other parties		Margin		Total votes cast
County	#	%	#	%	#	%	#	%	#	%	Total votes cast
Apache	5,638	43.26%	7,277	55.84%	117	0.90%	0	0.00%	-1,639	-12.58%	13,032
Cochise	16,405	62.25%	9,671	36.70%	279	1.06%	0	0.00%	6,734	25.55%	26,355
Coconino	17,581	59.13%	11,528	35.77%	622	2.09%	4	0.01%	6,053	20.36%	29,735
Gila	8,543	56.02%	6,509	42.68%	197	1.29%	0	0.00%	2,034	13.34%	15,249
Graham	5,247	62.35%	3,080	36.60%	89	1.06%	0	0.00%	2,167	25.75%	8,416
Greenlee	1,801	47.58%	1,963	51.86%	21	0.55%	0	0.00%	-162	-4.28%	3,785
La Paz	2,757	63.92%	1,502	34.82%	54	1.25%	0	0.00%	1,255	29.10%	4,313
Maricopa	411,902	71.98%	154,833	27.06%	5,509	0.96%	29	0.01%	257,069	44.92%	572,273
Mohave	17,364	69.26%	7,436	29.66%	272	1.08%	0	0.00%	9,928	39.60%	25,072
Navajo	11,379	58.12%	8,017	40.95%	182	0.93%	0	0.00%	3,362	17.17%	19,578
Pima	123,830	56.90%	91,585	42.09%	2,193	1.01%	4	0.00%	32,245	14.81%	217,612
Pinal	16,464	57.53%	11,923	41.66%	232	0.81%	0	0.00%	4,541	15.87%	28,619
Santa Cruz	3,855	60.34%	2,463	38.55%	71	1.11%	0	0.00%	1,392	21.79%	6,389
Yavapai	24,802	70.89%	9,609	27.46%	574	1.64%	3	0.01%	15,193	43.43%	34,988
Yuma	13,848	67.61%	6,458	31.53%	173	0.84%	2	0.01%	7,390	36.08%	20,481
Totals	681,416	66.42%	333,854	32.54%	10,585	1.03%	42	0.00%	347,562	33.88%	1,025,897

==== Counties that flipped from Republican to Democratic ====
- Apache

=== Electors ===
Electors were chosen by their party's voters in primary elections held on September 11, 1984.

Walter Mondale & Geraldine Ferraro Democratic Party	Ronald Reagan & George H. W. Bush Republican Party	David Bergland & James A. Lewis Libertarian Party	Larry Harmon & Milton R. Polland Independent	Sonia Johnson & Richard Walton Citizens Party	Robert B. Winn Independent
Francis J. Bronski; Michael A. Colletto; Jennie Cox; Rebecca W. Gaspar; Estevan A. Rodriguez; C. Wadzita; Bernetta L. Yost	Jim Click; Lewis W. Cooley; Alan A. Cullman; Peter D. Herder; Pattie Lewis; Harry K. Mehrtens; Ingo Radicke	Buck Crouch; Mimi Esser; Murray S. Feldstein; Kathy L. Harrer; Kim David Horner; Herb Johnson; Suzanne Kannarr	Maryann Carpenter; Donald P. Lincoln; Dora Diane Mata; Eileen Ransdell; Jerry M. Sawyer; Nancy L. Sherwood-Blight; George R. Wendell Sr.	Lillian Elizabeth Albin; Teresa J. Atkins; Martha Suzanne Bailey; Carolyn N. Berg; Naida L. Brooks; Judith M. Geunther; Marcia Niemann	Connie Jean Dowd; Judith Ann Eberle; Bonnie Rose Everson; Deborah Jo Heywood; Robert Eugene Heywood; Lisa Jeannean Holland; Natalie Virginia Moore

== See also ==
- Presidency of Ronald Reagan
