= 1940 United States presidential election in Arizona =

- November 5, 1940

All 3 Arizona votes to the Electoral College

Nominee	Franklin D. Roosevelt	Wendell Willkie
Party	Democratic	Republican
Home state	New York	New York
Running mate	Henry A. Wallace	Charles L. McNary
Electoral vote	3	0
Popular vote	95,267	54,030
Percentage	63.49%	36.01%
County results
Roosevelt
50–60%
60–70%
70–80%
President before election
Franklin D. Roosevelt
Democratic
Elected President
Franklin D. Roosevelt
Democratic

The 1940 United States presidential election in Arizona took place on November 5, 1940, as part of the 1940 United States presidential election. State voters chose three representatives, or electors, to the Electoral College, who voted for president and vice president.

Arizona was won by incumbent President Franklin D. Roosevelt (D–New York), running with U.S. Secretary of Agriculture Henry A. Wallace, with 63.49% of the popular vote, against President of Commonwealth and Southern Wendell Willkie (R–New York), running with Senate Minority Leader Charles L. McNary, with 36.01% of the popular vote.

== Results ==
1940 United States presidential election in Arizona
Party	Candidate	Votes	%
Democratic	Franklin D. Roosevelt (inc.)	95,267	63.49%
Republican	Wendell Willkie	54,030	36.01%
Prohibition	Roger Babson	742	0.49%
Majority		41,237	27.48%
Total votes		150,039	100.00%

=== Results by county ===
County	Franklin D. Roosevelt Democratic		Wendell Willkie Republican		Roger Babson Prohibition		Margin		Total votes cast
County	#	%	#	%	#	%	#	%	Total votes cast
Apache	1,969	67.94%	926	31.95%	3	0.10%	1,043	35.99%	2,898
Cochise	8,748	73.21%	3,170	26.53%	32	0.27%	5,578	46.68%	11,950
Coconino	3,025	61.10%	1,913	38.64%	13	0.26%	1,112	22.46%	4,951
Gila	5,752	68.42%	2,624	31.21%	31	0.37%	3,128	37.21%	8,407
Graham	3,130	72.62%	1,161	26.94%	19	0.44%	1,969	45.68%	4,310
Greenlee	2,175	77.60%	619	22.08%	9	0.32%	1,556	55.51%	2,803
Maricopa	35,055	60.36%	22,610	38.93%	414	0.71%	12,445	21.43%	58,079
Mohave	2,024	62.78%	1,198	37.16%	2	0.06%	826	25.62%	3,224
Navajo	3,052	66.39%	1,533	33.35%	12	0.26%	1,519	33.04%	4,597
Pima	14,035	59.57%	9,445	40.09%	82	0.35%	4,590	19.48%	23,562
Pinal	4,411	68.61%	1,996	31.05%	22	0.34%	2,415	37.56%	6,429
Santa Cruz	1,536	61.05%	978	38.87%	2	0.08%	558	22.18%	2,516
Yavapai	6,217	60.46%	3,987	38.78%	78	0.76%	2,230	21.69%	10,282
Yuma	4,138	68.61%	1,870	31.01%	23	0.38%	2,268	37.61%	6,031
Totals	95,267	63.49%	54,030	36.01%	742	0.49%	41,237	27.48%	150,039

=== Electors ===
Electors were chosen by their party's voters in primary elections held on September 10, 1940.

Franklin D. Roosevelt & Henry A. Wallace Democratic Party	Wendell Willkie & Charles L. McNary Republican Party	Roger Babson & Edgar Moorman Prohibition Party
Wirt G. Bowman; Andrew P. Martin; Mrs. W. P. Stuart	P. M. Elias; Charles J. McQuillan; J. E. Thompson	Mrs. A. P. Boone; E. B. Weed; W. J. Gordon
