= 1968 United States presidential election in Arizona =

- November 5, 1968

Nominee	Richard Nixon	Hubert Humphrey	George Wallace
Party	Republican	Democratic	American Independent
Home state	New York (Note: Although he was born in California and he served as a U.S. senator from California, in 1968 Richard Nixon’s official state of residence was New York, because he moved there to practice law after his defeat in the 1962 California gubernatorial election. During his first term as president, Nixon re-established his residence in California. Consequently, most reliable reference books list Nixon’s home state as New York in the 1968 election and his home state as California in the 1972 (and 1960) election.)	Minnesota	Alabama
Running mate	Spiro Agnew	Edmund Muskie	Curtis LeMay
Electoral vote	5	0	0
Popular vote	266,721	170,514	46,573
Percentage	54.78%	35.02%	9.56%
County results
Nixon
40–50%
50–60%
Humphrey
40–50%
60–70%
President before election
Lyndon B. Johnson
Democratic
Elected President
Richard Nixon
Republican

The 1968 United States presidential election in Arizona took place on November 5, 1968. All fifty states and the District of Columbia were part of the 1968 United States presidential election. State voters chose five electors to the Electoral College, who voted for president and vice president.

Arizona was won by the Republican nominees, Richard Nixon of New York and his running mate Governor Spiro Agnew of Maryland. Nixon and Agnew defeated the Democratic nominees, Incumbent Vice President Hubert Humphrey of Minnesota and his running mate U.S. Senator Edmund Muskie of Maine.

Nixon carried the state with 54.78% of the vote to Humphrey's 35.02%, a victory margin of 19.76%.

Arizona and South Carolina were the only two states carried by Goldwater in 1964 that went Republican again in 1968.

== Results ==
General election results
Party	Candidate	Votes	%
Republican	Richard Nixon	266,721	54.78%
Democratic	Hubert Humphrey	170,514	35.02%
American Independent	George Wallace	46,573	9.56%
New Party (Note: This was the party name that McCarthy's supporters in Arizona used to run their slate of electors)	Eugene McCarthy	2,751	0.56%
Peace and Freedom	Eldridge Cleaver	217	0.04%
Socialist Workers	Fred Halstead	85	0.02%
Socialist Labor	Henning A. Blomen	75	0.02%
Total votes		486,936	100.00%

=== Results by county ===
County	Richard Nixon Republican		Hubert Humphrey Democratic		George Wallace American Independent		Various candidates Other parties		Margin		Total votes cast
County	#	%	#	%	#	%	#	%	#	%	Total votes cast
Apache	2,092	49.83%	1,668	39.73%	402	9.58%	36	0.86%	424	10.10%	4,198
Cochise	7,619	45.59%	6,597	39.48%	2,393	14.32%	102	0.61%	1,022	6.11%	16,711
Coconino	6,765	59.38%	3,504	30.76%	1,049	9.21%	74	0.65%	3,261	28.62%	11,392
Gila	3,610	37.19%	4,831	49.77%	1,222	12.59%	43	0.44%	-1,221	-12.58%	9,706
Graham	2,327	47.21%	1,726	35.02%	859	17.43%	17	0.34%	601	12.19%	4,929
Greenlee	1,026	27.35%	2,434	64.89%	276	7.36%	15	0.40%	-1,408	-37.54%	3,751
Maricopa	162,262	59.08%	86,204	31.39%	24,941	9.08%	1,244	0.45%	76,058	27.69%	274,651
Mohave	3,208	51.64%	2,109	33.95%	883	14.21%	12	0.19%	1,099	17.69%	6,212
Navajo	4,596	51.00%	2,930	32.51%	1,438	15.96%	48	0.53%	1,666	18.49%	9,012
Pima	49,479	50.61%	39,786	40.70%	7,221	7.39%	1,280	1.31%	9,693	9.91%	97,766
Pinal	6,883	42.37%	7,409	45.61%	1,869	11.50%	85	0.52%	-526	-3.24%	16,246
Santa Cruz	1,702	48.17%	1,557	44.07%	242	6.85%	32	0.91%	145	4.10%	3,533
Yavapai	8,296	58.44%	3,989	28.10%	1,837	12.94%	74	0.52%	4,307	30.34%	14,196
Yuma	6,856	46.85%	5,770	39.43%	1,941	13.26%	66	0.45%	1,086	7.42%	14,633
Totals	266,721	54.78%	170,514	35.02%	46,573	9.56%	3,128	0.64%	96,207	19.76%	486,936

==== Counties that flipped from Democratic to Republican ====
- Apache
- Cochise
- Graham
- Mohave
- Pima
- Santa Cruz
- Yuma

== Electors ==
Electors were chosen by their party's voters in primary elections held on September 10, 1968.

Hubert Humphrey & Edmund Muskie Democratic Party	Richard Nixon & Spiro Agnew Republican Party	George Wallace & Curtis LeMay American Independent Party
Edyth G. Dailey; Mabel S. Ellis; Louise A. Henness; James B. McLay; Frank S, Minarik	Barnett E. Marks; Mrs. Marc A. Claridge; John G. F. Speiden; Frank A. Gyberg; William Bourdon	Richard Byford Hardt; Irene Anderson Leitch; Ross Eugene Leitch; Walter Edward Merritt; Robert B. Swan

Eugene McCarthy New Party	Eldridge Cleaver & Judith Page Peace and Freedom Party	Fred Halstead & Paul Boutelle Socialist Workers Party	Henning A. Blomen & George Taylor Socialist Labor Party
David Yetman; Joseph L. Cowan; William G. Carton; Nancy Bolster Fales; Robin N. Merrell	Illa Riggi; Dwight T. Hoxie; Emmett Calvin Brown; Alberta J. Dannells; Dorothy Lee Parra	Paul Ferdinand Luenow Jr.; Jeffrey Allen Ridenour; Morris Joseph Starsky; Ruth Pamela Starsky; William Monroe Wingfield	Justine Blackwell; Lawrence Gordon Blackwell; Elizabeth Horvath; Nickolas Mays; Wrignol E. Quillen
