= 1936 United States presidential election in Arizona =

- November 3, 1936

All 3 Arizona votes to the Electoral College

Nominee	Franklin D. Roosevelt	Alf Landon
Party	Democratic	Republican
Home state	New York	Kansas
Running mate	John Nance Garner	Frank Knox
Electoral vote	3	0
Popular vote	86,722	33,433
Percentage	69.85%	26.93%
County results
Roosevelt
60–70%
70–80%
80–90%
President before election
Franklin D. Roosevelt
Democratic
Elected President
Franklin D. Roosevelt
Democratic

The 1936 United States presidential election in Arizona took place on November 3, 1936, as part of the 1936 United States presidential election. State voters chose three representatives, or electors, to the Electoral College, who voted for president and vice president.

Arizona was won by incumbent President Franklin D. Roosevelt (D–New York), running with incumbent Vice President John Nance Garner, with 69.85% of the popular vote, against Governor of Kansas Alf Landon (R–Kansas), running with publisher Frank Knox, with 26.93% of the popular vote. As of the 2024 presidential election, this is the best showing ever for a presidential candidate in Arizona.

== Results ==
1936 United States presidential election in Arizona
Party	Candidate	Votes	%
Democratic	Franklin D. Roosevelt (inc.)	86,722	69.85%
Republican	Alf Landon	33,433	26.93%
Union	William Lemke	3,307	2.66%
Prohibition	D. Leigh Colvin	384	0.31%
Socialist	Norman Thomas	317	0.26%
Majority		53,289	42.92%
Total votes		124,163	100.00%

=== Results by county ===
County	Franklin D. Roosevelt Democratic		Alf Landon Republican		William Lemke Union		D. Leigh Colvin Prohibition		Norman Thomas Socialist		Margin		Total votes cast
County	#	%	#	%	#	%	#	%	#	%	#	%	Total votes cast
Apache	1,674	71.94%	638	27.42%	7	0.30%	4	0.17%	4	0.17%	1,036	44.52%	2,327
Cochise	8,130	77.44%	2,092	19.93%	232	2.21%	3	0.03%	42	0.40%	6,038	57.51%	10,499
Coconino	2,578	67.33%	1,140	29.77%	89	2.32%	12	0.31%	10	0.26%	1,438	37.56%	3,829
Gila	4,859	73.98%	1,526	23.23%	164	2.50%	9	0.14%	10	0.15%	3,333	50.75%	6,568
Graham	3,541	80.94%	680	15.54%	78	1.78%	67	1.53%	9	0.21%	2,861	65.40%	4,375
Greenlee	1,526	86.17%	218	12.31%	26	1.47%	1	0.06%	0	0.00%	1,308	73.86%	1,771
Maricopa	32,031	67.28%	13,671	28.71%	1,597	3.35%	188	0.39%	123	0.26%	18,360	38.57%	47,610
Mohave	1,814	71.73%	609	24.08%	94	3.72%	1	0.04%	11	0.43%	1,205	47.65%	2,529
Navajo	3,037	73.32%	1,052	25.40%	35	0.85%	3	0.07%	15	0.36%	1,985	47.92%	4,142
Pima	12,249	65.89%	6,079	32.70%	178	0.96%	41	0.22%	43	0.23%	6,170	33.19%	18,590
Pinal	3,498	71.86%	1,216	24.98%	136	2.79%	11	0.23%	7	0.14%	2,282	46.88%	4,868
Santa Cruz	1,729	68.34%	742	29.33%	53	2.09%	3	0.12%	3	0.12%	987	39.01%	2,530
Yavapai	6,628	66.77%	2,794	28.15%	450	4.53%	32	0.32%	22	0.22%	3,834	38.62%	9,926
Yuma	3,428	74.54%	976	21.22%	168	3.65%	10	0.22%	17	0.37%	2,452	53.32%	4,599
Totals	86,722	69.85%	33,433	26.93%	3,307	2.66%	384	0.31%	317	0.26%	53,289	42.92%	124,163

=== Electors ===
Electors were chosen by their party's voters in primary elections held on September 8, 1936.

Franklin D. Roosevelt & John Nance Garner Democratic Party	Alf Landon & Frank Knox Republican Party	William Lemke & Thomas C. O'Brien Union Party	D. Leigh Colvin & Claude A. Watson Prohibition Party	Norman Thomas & George A. Nelson Socialist Party
J. J. O'Dowd; J. G. Peterson; Mrs. W. H. Reeves	Jack C. Kinney; E. J. Nordyke; J. C. Reed	Leona W. Moore; C. B. Spooner; W. J. Wherry	Alzina P. Boone; John W. Forney; O. R. Weed	Anna Chase; Ell Link; Alva Shewey
