= 1932 United States presidential election in Arizona =

- November 8, 1932

All 3 Arizona votes to the Electoral College

Nominee	Franklin D. Roosevelt	Herbert Hoover
Party	Democratic	Republican
Home state	New York	California
Running mate	John Nance Garner	Charles Curtis
Electoral vote	3	0
Popular vote	79,264	36,104
Percentage	67.03%	30.53%
County results
Roosevelt
60–70%
70–80%
President before election
Herbert Hoover
Republican
Elected President
Franklin D. Roosevelt
Democratic

The 1932 United States presidential election in Arizona took place on November 8, 1932, as part of the 1932 United States presidential election. State voters chose three representatives, or electors, to the Electoral College, who voted for president and vice president.

Arizona was won by Governor of New York Franklin D. Roosevelt (D–New York), running with Speaker of the House John Nance Garner, with 67.03% of the popular vote, against incumbent President Herbert Hoover (R–California), running with incumbent Vice President Charles Curtis, with 30.53% of the popular vote.

This was the last time until 2020, and only the second time since statehood, that a non-incumbent Democrat would carry Arizona in a presidential election.

== Results ==
1932 United States presidential election in Arizona
Party	Candidate	Votes	%
Democratic	Franklin D. Roosevelt	79,264	67.03%
Republican	Herbert Hoover (inc.)	36,104	30.53%
Socialist	Norman Thomas	2,618	2.21%
Communist	William Z. Foster	256	0.22%
Arizona Progressive Democrat	—	9	0.01%
Majority		43,160	36.50%
Total votes		118,251	100.00%

=== Results by county ===
County	Franklin D. Roosevelt Democratic		Herbert Hoover Republican		Norman Thomas Socialist		William Z. Foster Communist		Margin		Total votes cast
County	#	%	#	%	#	%	#	%	#	%	Total votes cast
Apache	1,271	62.49%	760	37.36%	2	0.10%	1	0.05%	511	25.12%	2,034
Cochise	7,798	69.53%	2,838	25.30%	571	5.09%	9	0.08%	4,960	44.22%	11,216
Coconino	2,689	69.79%	1,110	28.81%	50	1.30%	4	0.10%	1,579	40.98%	3,853
Gila	4,625	68.84%	1,865	27.76%	209	3.11%	19	0.28%	2,760	41.08%	6,718
Graham	2,867	79.09%	718	19.81%	30	0.83%	10	0.28%	2,149	59.28%	3,625
Greenlee	1,558	79.73%	377	19.29%	6	0.31%	13	0.67%	1,181	60.44%	1,954
Maricopa	28,601	64.59%	15,086	34.07%	489	1.10%	95	0.21%	13,515	30.52%	44,280 (Note: All 9 votes for Arizona Progressive Democrat electors were cast in this county)
Mohave	1,660	72.71%	537	23.52%	81	3.55%	5	0.22%	1,123	49.19%	2,283
Navajo	2,602	62.76%	1,248	30.10%	294	7.09%	2	0.05%	1,354	32.66%	4,146
Pima	11,061	62.40%	6,152	34.70%	464	2.62%	50	0.28%	4,909	27.69%	17,727
Pinal	3,137	74.98%	1,000	23.90%	40	0.96%	7	0.17%	2,137	51.08%	4,184
Santa Cruz	1,606	71.06%	625	27.65%	26	1.15%	3	0.13%	981	43.41%	2,260
Yavapai	6,326	69.20%	2,626	28.73%	170	1.86%	19	0.21%	3,700	40.48%	9,141
Yuma	3,463	71.70%	1,162	24.06%	186	3.85%	19	0.39%	2,301	47.64%	4,830
Totals	79,264	67.03%	36,104	30.53%	2,618	2.21%	256	0.22%	43,160	36.50%	118,251

==== Counties that flipped from Republican to Democratic ====
- Apache
- Cochise
- Coconino
- Gila
- Maricopa
- Mohave
- Navajo
- Pima
- Pinal
- Yavapai
- Yuma

=== Electors ===
Electors were chosen by their party's voters in primary elections held on September 13, 1932.

Franklin D. Roosevelt & John Nance Garner Democratic Party	Herbert Hoover & Charles Curtis Republican Party	Norman Thomas & James H. Maurer Socialist Party	William Z. Foster & James W. Ford Communist Party	No Candidate Arizona Progressive Democratic Party
John G. Flynn; William R. Matthews; Roy Wayland	L. M. McKinley; John C. Phillips; Joseph Udall	George W. Barnes; Mary L. Sherwood; Willard L. McBride	E. J. Bryan; J. R. Macaulay; John Parker	Mrs. E. G. Monaghan; Roy Wayland; John G. Flynn
