= 1944 United States presidential election in Arizona =

- November 7, 1944

All 4 Arizona votes to the Electoral College

Nominee	Franklin D. Roosevelt	Thomas E. Dewey
Party	Democratic	Republican
Home state	New York	New York
Running mate	Harry S. Truman	John W. Bricker
Electoral vote	4	0
Popular vote	80,926	56,287
Percentage	58.80%	40.90%
County results
Roosevelt
50–60%
60–70%
70–80%
President before election
Franklin D. Roosevelt
Democratic
Elected President
Franklin D. Roosevelt
Democratic

The 1944 United States presidential election in Arizona took place on November 7, 1944, as part of the 1944 United States presidential election. State voters chose four representatives, or electors, to the Electoral College, who voted for president and vice president.

Arizona was won by incumbent President Franklin D. Roosevelt (D–New York), running with Senator Harry S. Truman, with 58.80% of the popular vote, against Governor Thomas Dewey (R–New York), running with Governor John W. Bricker, with 40.90% of the popular vote. As of 2024, this is the last time a Democrat won Arizona with a double digit margin of victory or carried the state more than once.

== Results ==
1944 United States presidential election in Arizona
Party	Candidate	Votes	%
Democratic	Franklin D. Roosevelt (inc.)	80,926	58.80%
Republican	Thomas Dewey	56,287	40.90%
Prohibition	Claude A. Watson	421	0.31%
Majority		24,639	17.90%
Total votes		137,634	100.00%

=== Results by county ===
County	Franklin D. Roosevelt Democratic		Thomas E. Dewey Republican		Claude A. Watson Prohibition		Margin		Total votes cast
County	#	%	#	%	#	%	#	%	Total votes cast
Apache	1,238	62.91%	728	36.99%	2	0.10%	510	25.91%	1,968
Cochise	6,935	67.21%	3,371	32.67%	13	0.13%	3,564	34.54%	10,319
Coconino	2,236	55.51%	1,786	44.34%	6	0.15%	450	11.17%	4,028
Gila	4,818	67.79%	2,260	31.80%	29	1.41%	2,558	35.99%	7,107
Graham	2,393	67.43%	1,151	32.43%	5	0.14%	1,242	35.00%	3,549
Greenlee	1,956	72.34%	739	27.33%	9	0.33%	1,217	45.01%	2,704
Maricopa	32,197	56.23%	24,853	43.41%	208	0.36%	7,344	12.83%	57,258
Mohave	1,303	57.05%	974	42.64%	7	0.31%	329	14.40%	2,284
Navajo	2,660	62.56%	1,579	37.14%	13	0.31%	1,081	25.42%	4,252
Pima	13,006	54.39%	10,850	45.37%	57	0.24%	2,156	9.02%	23,913
Pinal	3,026	61.04%	1,909	38.51%	22	0.44%	1,117	22.53%	4,957
Santa Cruz	1,291	63.85%	727	35.95%	4	0.20%	564	27.89%	2,022
Yavapai	4,395	55.21%	3,529	44.33%	36	0.45%	866	10.88%	7,960
Yuma	3,472	65.35%	1,831	34.46%	10	0.19%	1,641	30.89%	5,313
Totals	80,926	58.80%	56,287	40.90%	421	0.31%	24,639	17.90%	137,634

=== Electors ===
Electors were chosen by their party's voters in primary elections held on July 18, 1944.

Franklin D. Roosevelt & Harry S. Truman Democratic Party	Thomas E. Dewey & John W. Bricker Republican Party	Claude A. Watson & Andrew N. Johnson Prohibition Party
Henry M. Beard; Ed Cahill; Claire N. Webb; E. T. Williams Jr.	Mary A. Fegtly; E. V. O'Malley; Thomas H. O'Brien; C. B. Wilson	F. H. Chadwick; Mrs. J. A. LeMay; Don M. Headley; Will S. James
