= 1920 United States presidential election in Arizona =

- November 2, 1920
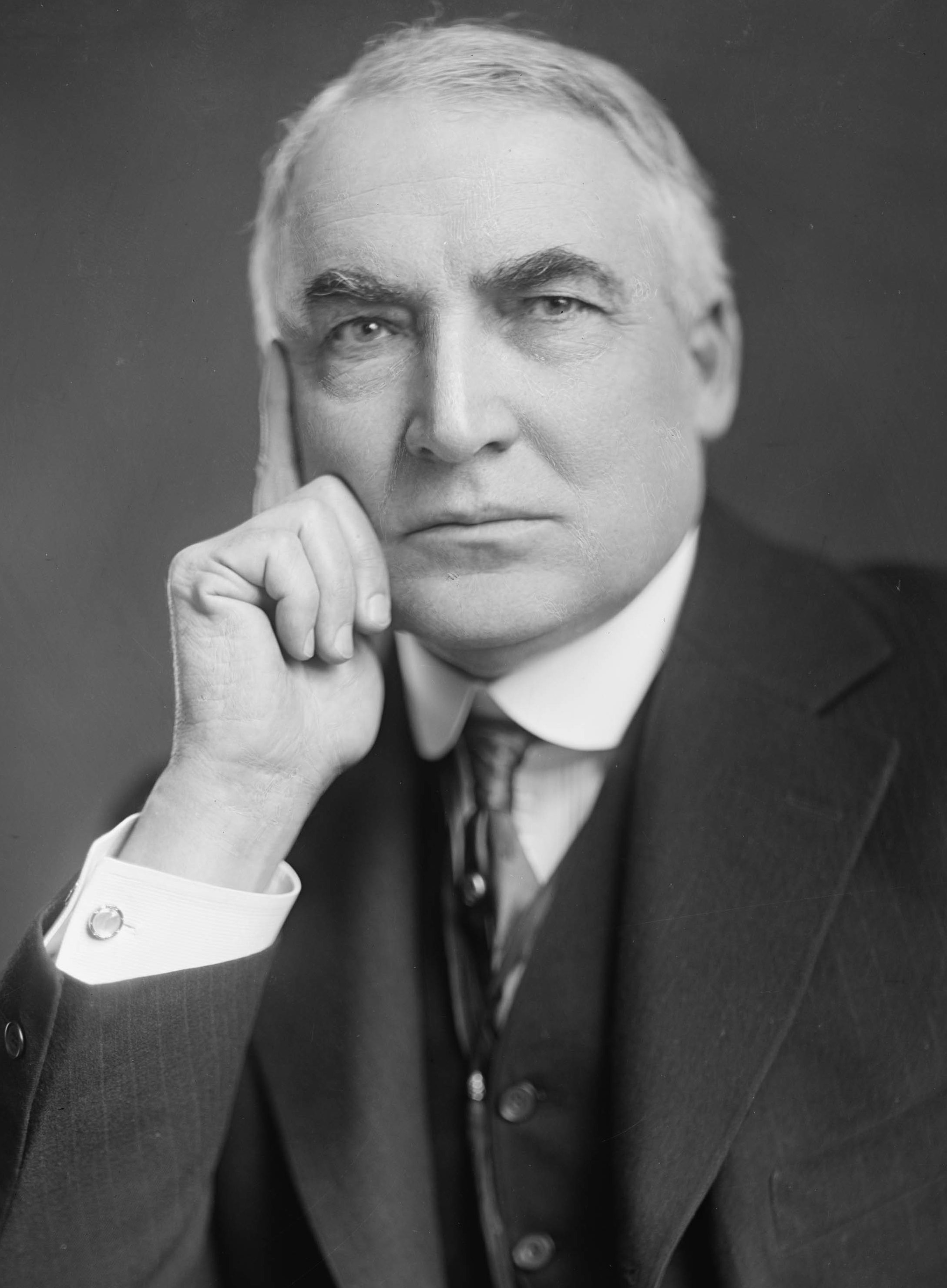

| Nominee | Warren G. Harding | James M. Cox |
| Party | Republican | Democratic |
| Home state | Ohio | Ohio |
| Running mate | Calvin Coolidge | Franklin D. Roosevelt |
| Electoral vote | 3 | 0 |
| Popular vote | 37,016 | 29,546 |
| Percentage | 55.61% | 44.39% |
County results
Harding
50–60%
60–70%
Cox
50–60%
President before election
Woodrow Wilson
Democratic
Elected President
Warren G. Harding
Republican

The 1920 United States presidential election in Arizona took place on November 2, 1920, as part of the 1920 United States presidential election in which all 48 states participated. Arizona voters chose three electors to represent them in the Electoral College via a popular vote pitting Democratic nominee James M. Cox and his running mate, Assistant Secretary of the Navy Franklin Roosevelt, against Republican challenger U.S. Senator Warren G. Harding and his running mate, Massachusetts Governor Calvin Coolidge.

By the beginning of 1920 skyrocketing inflation and Wilson's focus upon his proposed League of Nations at the expense of domestic policy had helped make the incumbent President Woodrow Wilson very unpopular – besides which Wilson also had major health problems that had left First Lady Edith effectively running the nation. Political unrest seen in the Palmer Raids and the "Red Scare" further added to the unpopularity of the Democratic Party, since this global political turmoil produced considerable fear of alien revolutionaries invading the country. Demand in the West for exclusion of Asian immigrants became even stronger than it had been before, and the factionalism that would almost destroy the Democratic Party later in the decade had already simmered.

Resultant opposition to the Democrats allowed Warren Harding to win the election in Arizona with 55.61% of the vote to James Cox' 44.39%. Harding won all but two counties; Graham and Greenlee in the state by a landslide.

== Results ==
1920 United States presidential election in Arizona
| Party | Candidate | Running mate | Votes | Percentage | Electoral votes |
|---|---|---|---|---|---|
| Republican | Warren G. Harding | Calvin Coolidge | 37,016 | 55.61% | 3 |
| Democratic | James M. Cox | Franklin D. Roosevelt | 29,546 | 44.39% | 0 |
| Totals | | | 66,562 | 100.00% | 3 |

=== Results by county ===
| County | Warren G. Harding Republican | | James M. Cox Democratic | | Margin | | Total votes cast |
| County | # | % | # | % | # | % | Total votes cast |
|---|---|---|---|---|---|---|---|
| Apache | 679 | 52.35% | 618 | 47.65% | 61 | 4.70% | 1,297 |
| Cochise | 5,341 | 54.66% | 4,430 | 45.34% | 911 | 9.32% | 9,771 |
| Coconino | 1,342 | 63.21% | 781 | 36.79% | 561 | 26.42% | 2,123 |
| Gila | 3,311 | 53.36% | 2,894 | 46.64% | 417 | 6.72% | 6,205 |
| Graham | 1,062 | 45.72% | 1,261 | 54.28% | -199 | -8.57% | 2,323 |
| Greenlee | 905 | 44.45% | 1,131 | 55.55% | -226 | -11.10% | 2,036 |
| Maricopa | 11,336 | 56.23% | 8,825 | 43.77% | 2,511 | 12.45% | 20,161 |
| Mohave | 996 | 57.97% | 722 | 42.03% | 274 | 15.95% | 1,718 |
| Navajo | 1,078 | 51.11% | 1,031 | 48.89% | 47 | 2.23% | 2,109 |
| Pima | 3,392 | 58.01% | 2,455 | 41.99% | 937 | 16.03% | 5,847 |
| Pinal | 1,493 | 54.15% | 1,264 | 45.85% | 229 | 8.31% | 2,757 |
| Santa Cruz | 850 | 54.63% | 706 | 45.37% | 144 | 9.25% | 1,556 |
| Yavapai | 3,625 | 61.69% | 2,251 | 38.31% | 1,374 | 23.38% | 5,876 |
| Yuma | 1,606 | 57.71% | 1,177 | 42.29% | 429 | 15.42% | 2,783 |
| Totals | 37,016 | 55.61% | 29,456 | 44.39% | 7,470 | 11.22% | 66,562 |

==== Counties that flipped from Democratic to Republican ====
- Apache
- Cochise
- Coconino
- Gila
- Maricopa
- Mohave
- Navajo
- Pinal
- Santa Cruz
- Yavapai
- Yuma

=== Electors ===
Upon becoming a state in 1912, Arizona used the then-standard method of choosing presidential electors where voters could pick the names directly, rather than voting for a specific presidential candidate. This method was gradually abandoned state by state throughout the first half of the 20th century; Arizona switched to the modern "short ballot" for the election in 1920. Voters would now select from among the actual presidential candidates' names with each vote treated as being for the candidate's entire slate of electors. The electors were chosen by their party's voters in primary elections held on September 7, 1920.

| James M. Cox & Franklin D. Roosevelt Democratic Party | Warren G. Harding & Calvin Coolidge Republican Party |
|---|---|
| B. F. Billingsley; May Belle Craig; H. T. Southworth | James P. Boyle; Joseph W. Smith; Frank R. Stweart |
