= 1940 United States gubernatorial elections =

- November 5, 1940; September 9, 1940 (ME)

34 governorships
	Majority party	Minority party
Party	Democratic	Republican
Seats before	30	18
Seats after	28	20
Seat change	▼2	▲2
Seats up	19	15
Seats won	17	17
- Democratic hold Democratic gain Republican hold Republican gain No election

United States gubernatorial elections were held in 1940, in 34 states, concurrent with the House, Senate elections and presidential election, on November 5, 1940. Elections took place on September 9 in Maine.

This was the last time Georgia elected its governors to 2-year terms, as it switched to 4-years terms from the 1942 election.

== Race summary ==
State	Governor	Party	First elected	Status	Candidates
Arizona	Robert Taylor Jones	Democratic	1938	Incumbent lost renomination. Democratic hold.	▌ ✓ Sidney Preston Osborn (Democratic) 65.5%; ▌Jerrie W. Lee (Republican) 33.8%; ▌Charles R. Osburn (Prohibition) 0.7%
Arkansas	Carl E. Bailey	Democratic	1936	Incumbent lost renomination. Democratic hold.	▌ ✓ Homer Adkins (Democratic) 91.4%; ▌H.C. Stump (Republican) 8.2%; ▌Walter S. McNutt (Independent) 0.4%
Colorado	Ralph Lawrence Carr	Republican	1938	Incumbent re-elected.	▌ ✓ Ralph Lawrence Carr (Republican) 54.4%; ▌George E. Saunders (Democratic) 45.0%; ▌Carle Whitehead (Socialist) 0.4%; ▌Laurence W. Cofman (Prohibition) 0.3%
Connecticut	Raymond E. Baldwin	Republican	1938	Incumbent lost re-election. Democratic gain.	▌ ✓ Robert A. Hurley (Democratic) 49.5%; ▌Raymond E. Baldwin (Republican) 47.8%; ▌Jasper McLevy (Socialist) 2.3%; ▌Joseph Mackay (Socialist Labor) 0.2%; ▌Michael A. Russo (Communist) 0.2%
Delaware	Richard McMullen	Democratic	1936	Incumbent won renomination, then retired. Republican gain.	▌ ✓ Walter W. Bacon (Republican) 52.4%; ▌Josiah Marvel Jr. (Democratic) 45.4%; ▌Ivan Culbertson (Liberal Democrat) 2.2%
Florida	Fred P. Cone	Democratic	1936	Incumbent term-limited. Democratic hold.	Primary runoff: ▌ ✓ Spessard Holland (Democratic) 56.95%; ▌ Francis P. Whitehair (Democratic) 43.05%; General election: ▌ ✓ Spessard Holland (Democratic) 100.0%
Georgia	Eurith D. Rivers	Democratic	1936	Incumbent term-limited. Democratic hold.	Primary election: ▌ ✓ Eugene Talmadge (Democratic) 51.58%; ▌ Columbus Roberts (Democratic) 35.95%; ▌ Hosea Abit Nix (Democratic) 12.47%; General election: ▌ ✓ Eugene Talmadge (Democratic) 99.6%; ▌ J. L. R. Boyd (Prohibition) 0.3%; ▌Joe Wallace (Independent) 0.1%
Idaho	C. A. Bottolfsen	Republican	1938	Incumbent lost re-election. Democratic gain.	▌ ✓ Chase A. Clark (Democratic) 50.48%; ▌ C. A. Bottolfsen (Republican) 49.52%
Illinois	John Henry Stelle	Democratic	1940 (Note: Stelle became governor on October 6, 1940, after predecessor (Henry Horner) died.)	Incumbent retired. Republican gain.	▌ ✓ Dwight H. Green (Republican) 53.0%; ▌ Harry Hershey (Democratic) 46.7%; ▌Arthur McDowell (Socialist) 0.18%; ▌Clay Freeman Gaumer (Prohibition) 0.16%
Indiana	M. Clifford Townsend	Democratic	1936	Incumbent retired. Democratic hold.	▌ ✓ Henry F. Schricker (Democratic) 49.92%; ▌ Glenn R. Hillis (Republican) 49.69%; ▌ Mary Donovan Hapgood (Socialist) 0.27%; ▌ Omer S. Whiteman (Prohibition) 0.08%; ▌Herman Barcus Barefield (Socialist Labor) 0.04%
Iowa	George A. Wilson	Republican	1938	Incumbent re-elected.	▌ ✓ George A. Wilson (Republican) 52.7%; ▌ John Valentine (Democratic) 47.1%; ▌M. M. Heptonstall (Prohibition) 0.1%; ▌ Charles Speck (Communist) 0.1%
Kansas	Payne Ratner	Republican	1938	Incumbent re-elected.	▌ ✓ Payne Ratner (Republican) 49.63%; ▌ William H. Burke (Democratic) 49.58%; ▌ David C. White (Prohibition) 0.61%; ▌Ida A. Beloof (Socialist) 0.19%
Maine	Lewis O. Barrows	Republican	1936	Incumbent retired. Republican hold.	▌ ✓ Sumner Sewall (Republican) 63.8%; ▌ Fulton J. Redman (Democratic) 36.1%; ▌Helen Knudsen (Communist) 0.1%
Massachusetts	Leverett Saltonstall	Republican	1938	Incumbent re-elected.	▌ ✓ Leverett Saltonstall (Republican) 49.74%; ▌ Paul A. Dever (Democratic) 49.46%; ▌Otis Archer Hood (Communist) 0.28%; ▌Jeffrey W. Campbell (Socialist) 0.23%; ▌Henning A. Blomen (Socialist Labor) 0.17%; ▌E. Tallmadge Root (Prohibition) 0.12%
Michigan	Luren Dickinson	Republican	1938	Incumbent lost re-election. Democratic gain.	▌ ✓ Murray Van Wagoner (Democratic) 53.1%; ▌ Luren Dickinson (Republican) 46.6%; ▌Seth Whitmore (Socialist) 0.2%; ▌Philip Raymond (Communist) 0.12%; ▌Ralph Naylor (Socialist Labor) 0.04%
Minnesota	Harold Stassen	Republican	1938	Incumbent re-elected.	▌ ✓ Harold Stassen (Republican) 52.1%; ▌ Hjalmar Petersen (Farmer-Labor) 36.6%; ▌ Edward Murphy (Democratic) 11.1%; ▌John William Castle (Industrial) 0.25%
Missouri	Lloyd C. Stark	Democratic	1936	Incumbent term-limited. Republican gain.	▌ ✓ Forrest C. Donnell (Republican) 50.05%; ▌ Larry McDaniel (Democratic) 49.85%; ▌Jed A. High (Socialist) 0.09%; ▌William Wesley Cox (Socialist Labor) 0.01%
Montana	Roy E. Ayers	Democratic	1936	Incumbent lost re-election. Republican gain.	▌ ✓ Sam C. Ford (Republican) 50.67%; ▌ Roy E. Ayers (Democratic) 48.64%; ▌Arvo Fredrickson (Communist) 0.7%
Nebraska	Robert Leroy Cochran	Democratic	1934	Incumbent retired. Republican gain.	▌ ✓ Dwight Griswold (Republican) 60.9%; ▌ Terry Carpenter (Democratic) 39.1%
New Hampshire	Francis P. Murphy	Republican	1936	Incumbent retired. Republican hold.	▌ ✓ Robert O. Blood (Republican) 50.7%; ▌ F. Clyde Keefe (Democratic) 49.3%
New Jersey	A. Harry Moore	Democratic	1925; 1928 (term-limited); 1931; 1934 (term-limited); 1937	Incumbent term-limited. Democratic hold.	▌ ✓ Charles Edison (Democratic) 51.4%; ▌ Robert C. Hendrickson (Republican) 48.0%; ▌Marion Douglas (Socialist) 0.4%; ▌Manuel Cantor (Communist) 0.1%; ▌John C. Butterworth (Socialist Labor) 0.1%; ▌Elmo L. Bateman (Prohibition) 0.03%
New Mexico	John E. Miles	Democratic	1938	Incumbent re-elected.	▌ ✓ John E. Miles (Democratic) 55.6%; ▌ Maurice Miera (Republican) 44.4%
North Carolina	Clyde R. Hoey	Democratic	1936	Incumbent term-limited. Democratic hold.	▌ ✓ J. Melville Broughton (Democratic) 75.7%; ▌ Robert H. McNeill (Republican) 24.3%
North Dakota	John Moses	Democratic	1938	Incumbent re-elected.	▌ ✓ John Moses (Democratic) 63.1%; ▌ Jack A. Patterson (Republican) 36.9%
Ohio	John W. Bricker	Republican	1938	Incumbent re-elected.	▌ ✓ John W. Bricker (Republican) 55.6%; ▌ Martin L. Davey (Democratic) 45.5%
Rhode Island	William Henry Vanderbilt III	Republican	1938	Incumbent lost re-election. Democratic gain.	▌ ✓ J. Howard McGrath (Democratic) 55.8%; ▌ William Henry Vanderbilt III (Republican) 44.1%; ▌Wilfred J. Boissy (Communist) 0.1%
South Dakota	Harlan J. Bushfield	Republican	1938	Incumbent re-elected.	▌ ✓ Harlan J. Bushfield (Republican) 55.1%; ▌ Lewis W. Bicknell (Democratic) 44.9%
Tennessee	Prentice Cooper	Democratic	1938	Incumbent re-elected.	▌ ✓ Prentice Cooper (Democratic) 72.1%; ▌ C. Arthur Bruce (Republican) 27.9%
Texas	W. Lee O'Daniel	Democratic	1938	Incumbent re-elected.	▌ ✓ W. Lee O'Daniel (Democratic) 94.4%; ▌ George C. Hopkins (Republican) 5.6%; ▌Ben H. Lauderdale (Communist) 0.03%
Utah	Henry H. Blood	Democratic	1932	Incumbent retired. Democratic gain.	▌ ✓ Herbert B. Maw (Democratic) 52.1%; ▌ Don B. Colton (Republican) 47.7%; ▌Ada Williams Quinn (Independent) 0.24%
Vermont	George Aiken	Republican	1936	Incumbent retired. Republican hold.	▌ ✓ William Henry Wills (Republican) 64.0%; ▌ John McGrath (Democratic) 36.0%
Washington	Clarence D. Martin	Democratic	1932	Incumbent lost renomination. Republican gain.	▌ ✓ Arthur B. Langlie (Republican) 50.24%; ▌ Clarence Dill (Democratic) 49.49%; ▌John Brockway (Communist) 0.21%; ▌P. J. Ater (Socialist Labor) 0.06%
West Virginia	Homer A. Holt	Democratic	1936	Incumbent term-limited. Democratic hold.	▌ ✓ Matthew M. Neely (Democratic) 56.4%; ▌ Daniel Boone Dawson (Republican) 43.6%
Wisconsin	Julius P. Heil	Republican	1938	Incumbent re-elected.	▌ ✓ Julius P. Heil (Republican) 40.67%; ▌ Orland Steen Loomis (Progressive) 39.78%; ▌Francis E. McGovern (Democratic) 19.29%; ▌Fred B. Blair (Communist) 0.17%; ▌Louis Fisher (Socialist Labor) 0.08%

== Closest races ==
States where the margin of victory was under 1%:

1. Kansas, 0.05%
2. Missouri, 0.20%
3. Indiana, 0.23%
4. Massachusetts, 0.28%
5. Washington, 0.75%
6. Wisconsin, 0.89%
7. Idaho, 0.96%

States where the margin of victory was under 5%:

1. New Hampshire, 1.48%
2. Connecticut, 1.76%
3. Montana, 2.03%
4. New Jersey, 3.34%
5. Utah, 4.38%

States where the margin of victory was under 10%:

1. Iowa, 5.6%
2. Illinois, 6.3%
3. Michigan, 6.5%
4. Delaware, 7.0%
5. Colorado, 9.4%

Red denotes states won by Republicans. Blue denotes states won by Democrats.

== See also ==
- 1940 United States elections
  - 1940 United States presidential election
  - 1940 United States Senate elections
  - 1940 United States House of Representatives elections
