= Arizona Republican Party =

Affiliate of the US Republican Party in Arizona

- Chairperson: Sergio Arellano
- Arizona State Treasurer: Kimberly Yee
- Arizona Superintendent of Public Instruction: Tom Horne
- Speaker of the House: Steve Montenegro
- Senate President: Warren Petersen
- Headquarters: 3033 N Central Ave; Suite 300; Phoenix, AZ 85012
- Student wing: Arizona Federation of College Republicans
- Youth wing: Arizona Young Republicans, AZ Teenage Republicans
- Membership (January 2026): ▲1,602,566
- Ideology: Conservatism
- National affiliation: Republican Party
- Colors: Red
- Arizona Senate: 17 / 30
- Arizona House of Representatives: 33 / 60
- United States Senate: 0 / 2
- United States House of Representatives: 6 / 9
- Statewide Executive Offices: 3 / 6
- Arizona Corporation Commission: 5 / 5
- Maricopa Board of Supervisors: 4 / 5
- Phoenix City Council: 2 / 9
- Navajo Executives: 0 / 2

Website
- azgop.com

The Arizona Republican Party is the affiliate of the Republican Party in the US state of Arizona. Its headquarters are in Phoenix, Arizona. The party currently controls six of Arizona's nine United States House of Representatives seats, seventeen of thirty Arizona Senate seats, thirty-three of sixty Arizona House of Representatives seats, four of five seats on the Arizona Corporation Commission and three Statewide Executive Offices (Arizona State Treasurer, Arizona Superintendent of Public Instruction, and Arizona State Mine Inspector)

Since 2020, the state party had significant Christian nationalist and far-right factions. The Arizona Republican Party played key roles in attempts to overturn the results of the 2020 United States presidential election and the 2022 Arizona gubernatorial election.

== History ==
The organizational convention of the Republican Party in the Arizona Territory, chaired by James Churchman, was held on November 6–7, 1866, in Prescott, Arizona.

Republicans held both of the state's U.S. Senate seats between 1995 and 2019, and the governorship for all but six years between 1991 and 2023. Republican presidential candidates won the state in every election between 1996 and 2020.

The party's cash reserves fell from around $770,000 in 2019, to less than $50,000 in 2023. The organization spent $300,000 on legal counseling while attempting to overturn the results of the 2020 presidential election and $500,000 on an election night party in 2022.

== Current structure ==
Here is the structure of the state party, as of Jan 2026.

=== Elected officers of the State Committee ===
- Sergio Arellano, Chairman
- Jake Hoffman, National committeeman
- Liz Harris, National committeewoman
- Sherra Kissee, Secretary
- Ron Gould, Treasurer
- Shiry Sapir, First vice chairman
- Kevin Maldonado, Second vice chairman
- Nickie Kelley, Third Vice Chairman
- Carrie Hughes, Sergeant at Arms
- Shirley Dye, Assistant Secretary
- Young Mayberry, Assistant Treasurer
- Frank Antenori, Assistant Sergeant at Arms

=== State Executive Committee ===
- The 12 elected officers of the State Committee (listed above)
- The 15 county Republican chairmen, first-vice and second-vice chairmen
- The 28 Members-At-Large (three from each of nine congressional districts)
- National Committeeman and National Committeewoman (RNC members)

=== State Committee ===
- The 15 county Republican chairmen
- One member for each three elected Republican PCs

The chairman, Secretary and Treasurer elected at the biannual Statutory Meeting and other officers elected at the biannual Mandatory Meeting (except National Committeeman and Committeewoman, who are elected at quadrennial State Convention).

=== County committees ===
County committees include all PCs within that county. They meet in January after general elections to elect a chairman, two vice chairs, a secretary and a treasurer.

=== Legislative district committees ===
Legislative district committees exist in counties of more than 500,000 people (Maricopa and Pima Counties), and include all PCs within that district. Officers are elected at Organizational Meetings after the general election including a chairman, two vice chairs, a secretary and a treasurer.

=== Precinct committeemen ===
Precinct committeemen are elected one per precinct, plus one additional for each 125 registered voters of that party as of March 1 of the general election year. There are over 1,666 precincts statewide (including over 724 precincts in Maricopa County.)

== Federal officials ==
These are the Republican Party members who hold federal offices.

=== U.S. Senate ===
- None

Both of Arizona's U.S. Senate seats have been held by the Democratic caucus since 2020. Martha McSally is the last Republican to represent Arizona in the U.S. Senate. Appointed in 2019 by Governor Doug Ducey after the resignation of Jon Kyl who was appointed to the seat after the death of John McCain in 2018, McSally lost the 2020 special election to determine who would serve the remainder of the term expiring in 2023. McSally lost the special election to Democratic challenger Mark Kelly, who won a full term in 2022, defeating Blake Masters. John McCain is the last Republican elected to represent Arizona in the U.S. Senate in 2016, while Jeff Flake is the last Republican to represent Arizona for a full term in the U.S. Senate from 2013 to 2019.

=== U.S. House of Representatives ===
Out of the nine seats Arizona is apportioned in the U.S. House of Representatives, six are held by Republicans:

Arizona Republicans in House of Representatives
District	Member	Photo
1st	David Schweikert	
2nd	Eli Crane	
5th	Andy Biggs	
5th	Mark Lamb (elect)	
6th	Juan Ciscomani	
8th	Abraham Hamadeh	
9th	Paul Gosar	

== State officials ==
=== Executive ===
The Arizona Republican Party controls 8 of 11 elected statewide executive offices:

- Tom Horne (Arizona Superintendent of Public Instruction)
- Kimberly Yee (State Treasurer)
- Les Presmyk (State Mine Inspector)
- Kevin Thompson (Arizona Corporation Commission)
- Nick Meyers (Arizona Corporation Commission)
- Lea Marquez Peterson (Corporation Commissioner)
- Rene Lopez (Corporation Commissioner)
- Rachel Walden (Corporation Commissioner)

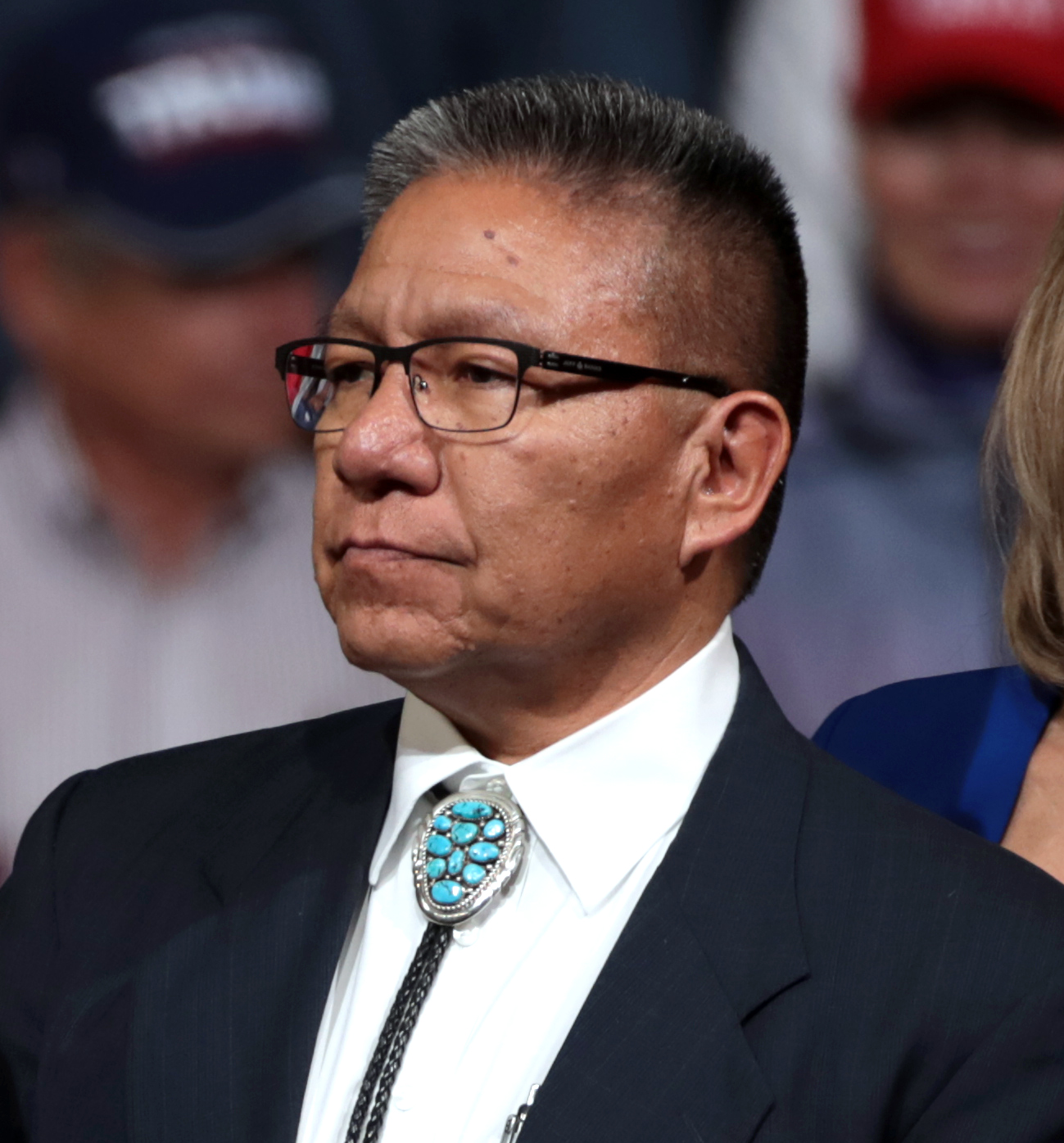
Former Navajo Vice President Myron Lizer, the most recent Republican in Navajo leadership.

=== Senate ===
The Arizona Republican Party holds the majority in the Arizona Senate, holding 17 of the 30 seats.

=== House ===
The Arizona Republican Party holds the majority in the Arizona House of Representatives, holding 33 of the 60 seats.

=== Navajo Executives ===
The Arizona Republican Party does not hold any power in the Navajo Nation government, the largest Native American tribe in the state, which controls the Four Corners. The last Republican elected to Navajo leadership was Myron Lizer, who served as vice president from 2019 to 2023.

== Mayors ==
- Jason Beck (Peoria)
- Steve Otto (Payson)
- Scott Anderson (Gilbert)
- Mark Stanton (Paradise Valley)
- Michael LeVault (Youngtown)
- Cal Sheehy (Lake Havasu City)
- Thomas Schoaf (Litchfield Park)
- Jon Thompson (Coolidge)
- Phil Goode (Prescott)
- Mark Freeman (Mesa)
- Kevin Hartle (Chandler)
- Byron Lewis (Snowflake)

== Party chairs ==
Party Chair	Term
Orme Lewis	1938–1940
Carl Divelbis	1948–1950
Richard Myers	1952–1954
Richard Kleindienst	1956–1960
Stephen Shadegg	1960–1961
Richard Kleindienst	1961–1963
Keith Brown	1963–1965
Harry Rosenzweig	1965–1976
James Colter	1976–1978
Thomas Pappas	1978–1983
John Munger	1983–1985
Burton Kruglick	1985–1991
Gerald Davis	1991–1993
Dodie Londen	1993–1997
Mike Hellon	1997–1999
Michael Minnaugh	1999–2001
Bob Fannin	2001–2005
Matt Salmon	2005–2007
Randy Pullen	2007–2011
Tom Morrissey	2011–2013
Robert Graham	2013–2017
Jonathan Lines	2017–2019
Kelli Ward	2019–2023
Jeff DeWit	2023–2024
Jill Norgaard	2024–2024 (interim)
Gina Swoboda	2024–2026
Sergio Arellano	2026-

== Election results ==
=== Presidential ===
Arizona Republican Party presidential election results
Election	Presidential Ticket	Votes	Vote %	Electoral votes	Result
1912	William Howard Taft/Nicholas M. Butler	3,021	12.7%	0 / 3	Lost
1916	Charles E. Hughes/Charles W. Fairbanks	20,524	35.4%	0 / 3	Lost
1920	Warren G. Harding/Calvin Coolidge	37,016	55.9%	3 / 3	Won
1924	Calvin Coolidge/Charles G. Dawes	30,516	41.3%	3 / 3	Won
1928	Herbert Hoover/Charles Curtis	52,533	57.6%	3 / 3	Won
1932	Herbert Hoover/Charles Curtis	36,104	30.5%	0 / 3	Lost
1936	Alf Landon/Frank Knox	33,433	26.9%	0 / 3	Lost
1940	Wendell Willkie/Charles L. McNary	54,030	36.0%	0 / 3	Lost
1944	Thomas E. Dewey/John W. Bricker	56,287	40.9%	0 / 4	Lost
1948	Thomas E. Dewey/Earl Warren	77,597	43.8%	0 / 4	Lost
1952	Dwight D. Eisenhower/Richard Nixon	152,042	58.4%	4 / 4	Won
1956	Dwight D. Eisenhower/Richard Nixon	176,990	61.0%	4 / 4	Won
1960	Richard Nixon/Henry Cabot Lodge Jr.	221,241	55.5%	4 / 4	Lost
1964	Barry Goldwater/William E. Miller	242,535	50.5%	5 / 5	Lost
1968	Richard Nixon/Spiro Agnew	266,721	54.8%	5 / 5	Won
1972	Richard Nixon/Spiro Agnew	402,812	61.6%	6 / 6	Won
1976	Gerald Ford/Bob Dole	418,642	56.4%	6 / 6	Lost
1980	Ronald Reagan/George H. W. Bush	529,688	60.6%	6 / 6	Won
1984	Ronald Reagan/George H. W. Bush	681,416	66.4%	7 / 7	Won
1988	George H. W. Bush/Dan Quayle	702,541	60.0%	7 / 7	Won
1992	George H. W. Bush/Dan Quayle	572,086	38.5%	8 / 8	Lost
1996	Bob Dole/Jack Kemp	622,073	44.3%	0 / 8	Lost
2000	George W. Bush/Dick Cheney	781,652	51.0%	8 / 8	Won
2004	George W. Bush/Dick Cheney	1,104,294	54.8%	10 / 10	Won
2008	John McCain/Sarah Palin	1,230,111	53.4%	10 / 10	Lost
2012	Mitt Romney/Paul Ryan	1,233,654	53.5%	11 / 11	Lost
2016	Donald Trump/Mike Pence	1,252,401	48.1%	11 / 11	Won
2020	Donald Trump/Mike Pence	1,661,686	49.1%	0 / 11	Lost
2024	Donald Trump/JD Vance	1,763,037	52.2%	11 / 11	Won

=== Gubernatorial ===
Arizona Republican Party gubernatorial election results
Election	Gubernatorial candidate	Votes	Vote %	Result
1911	Edmund W. Wells	9,166	42.4%	Lost ✗
1914	Ralph H. Cameron	17,602	34.5%	Lost ✗
1916	Thomas E. Campbell	28,051	47.9%	Lost ✗
1918	Thomas E. Campbell	25,927	49.9%	Won ✓
1920	Thomas E. Campbell	37,060	54.2%	Won ✓
1922	Thomas E. Campbell	30,599	45.1%	Lost ✗
1924	Dwight B. Heard	37,571	49.5%	Lost ✗
1926	Elis S. Clark	39,580	49.8%	Lost ✗
1928	John Calhoun Phillips	47,829	51.7%	Won ✓
1930	John Calhoun Phillips	46,231	48.6%	Lost ✗
1932	J. C. "Jack" Kinney	42,202	35.4%	Lost ✗
1934	Thomas Maddock	39,242	38.2%	Lost ✗
1936	Thomas E. Campbell	36,114	29.1%	Lost ✗
1938	Jerrie W. Lee	32,022	27.3%	Lost ✗
1940	Jerrie W. Lee	50,358	33.8%	Lost ✗
1942	Jerrie W. Lee	23,562	26.9%	Lost ✗
1944	Jerrie W. Lee	27,261	21.2%	Lost ✗
1946	Bruce Brockett	48,867	39.9%	Lost ✗
1948	Bruce Brockett	70,419	40.1%	Lost ✗
1950	John Howard Pyle	99,109	50.8%	Won ✓
1952	John Howard Pyle	156,592	60.2%	Won ✓
1954	John Howard Pyle	115,866	47.5%	Lost ✗
1956	Horace B. Griffen	116,744	40.5%	Lost ✗
1958	Paul Fannin	160,136	55.1%	Won ✓
1960	Paul Fannin	235,502	59.3%	Won ✓
1962	Paul Fannin	200,578	54.8%	Won ✓
1964	Richard Kleindienst	221,404	46.8%	Lost ✗
1966	Jack Williams	203,438	53.8%	Won ✓
1968	Jack Williams	279,923	57.8%	Won ✓
1970	Jack Williams	209,356	50.9%	Won ✓
1974	Russell Williams	273,674	49.6%	Lost ✗
1978	Evan Mecham	241,093	44.8%	Lost ✗
1982	Leo Corbet	235,877	32.5%	Lost ✗
1986	Evan Mecham	343,913	39.7%	Won ✓
1990 (runoff)	Fife Symington III	492,569	52.4%	Won ✓
1994	Fife Symington III	593,492	52.5%	Won ✓
1998	Jane Dee Hull	620,188	61.0%	Won ✓
2002	Matt Salmon	554,465	45.2%	Lost ✗
2006	Len Munsil	543,528	35.4%	Lost ✗
2010	Jan Brewer	938,934	54.3%	Won ✓
2014	Doug Ducey	805,062	53.4%	Won ✓
2018	Doug Ducey	1,330,863	56.0%	Won ✓
2022	Kari Lake	1,270,774	49.7%	Lost ✗
2026	Andy Biggs	1,093,643	42.4%	Lost ✗

== Former prominent Arizona Republicans ==
=== United States delegates ===
- Charles Debrille Poston (1864–1865)
- John Noble Goodwin (1865–1867)
- Curtis Coe Bean (1885–1887)
- Nathan Oakes Murphy (1895–1897)
- Ralph Henry Cameron (1909–1912)

=== United States senators ===
- Ralph H. Cameron (1921–1927)
- Paul Fannin (1965–1977)
- Barry Goldwater (1953–1965, 1969–1987)
- John McCain (1987–2018)
- Jon Kyl (1995–2013, 2018)
- Jeff Flake (2013–2019)
- Martha McSally (2019–2020)

=== United States representatives ===
- John Jacob Rhodes (AZ-1) (1953–1983)
- John McCain (AZ-1) (1983–1987)
- John Jacob Rhodes III (AZ-1) (1987–1993)
- Matt Salmon (AZ-1) (1995–2001)
- Jeff Flake (AZ-1) (2001–2013)
- Rick Renzi (AZ-1) (2003–2009)
- Sam Steiger (AZ-3) (1967–1977)
- Bob Stump (AZ-3) (1983–2003)
- John Bertrand Conlan (AZ-4) (1973–1977)
- Eldon D. Rudd (AZ-4) (1977–1987)
- Jon Kyl (AZ-4) (1987–1995)
- John B. Shadegg (AZ-4) (1995–2003)
- Jim Kolbe (AZ-5) (1985–2003)
- J. D. Hayworth (AZ-5) (2003–2007)
- J. D. Hayworth (AZ-6) (1995–2003)
- Jim Kolbe (AZ-8) (2003–2007)

=== Territorial governors ===
- John Noble Goodwin (1863–1865)
- Richard Cunningham McCormick (1866–1869)
- Anson P.K. Safford (1869–1877)
- John Philo Hoyt (1877–1878)
- John C. Frémont (1878–1881)
- Frederick Augustus Tritle (1882–1885)
- Lewis Wolfley (1889–1890)
- John N. Irwin (1891–1892)
- Nathan Oakes Murphy (1892–1893, 1898–1902)
- Myron H. McCord (1897–1898)
- Alexander Oswald Brodie (1902–1905)
- Joseph Henry Kibbey (1905–1909)
- Richard Elihu Sloan (1909–1912)

=== State governors ===
- Thomas Edward Campbell (1917, 1919–1923)
- John Calhoun Phillips (1929–1931)
- John Howard Pyle (1951–1955)
- Paul Fannin (1959–1965)
- Jack Richard Williams (1967–1975)
- Evan Mecham (1987–1988)
- Fife Symington III (1991–1997)
- Jane Dee Hull (1997–2003)
- Jan Brewer (2009 - 2015)
- Doug Ducey (2015–2023)

== See also ==
- Arizona Democratic Party
- Arizona Libertarian Party
- Arizona Green Party
- Political party strength in Arizona
- Constitution Party of Arizona

== Works cited ==
- "Barre Enterprise". Arizona Miner. November 10, 1866. p. 3 – via Newspapers.com.
