= 1944 United States gubernatorial elections =

- November 7, 1944; September 11, 1944 (ME)

32 governorships
	Majority party	Minority party
Party	Democratic	Republican
Seats before	22	26
Seats after	25	23
Seat change	▲3	▼3
Seats up	12	20
Seats won	15	17
- Democratic hold Democratic gain Republican hold Republican gain No election

United States gubernatorial elections were held in 1944, in 32 states, concurrent with the House, Senate elections and presidential election, on November 7, 1944. Elections took place on September 11 in Maine.

This was the last time Idaho elected its governors to 2-year terms, switching to 4-years from the 1946 election.

== Race summary ==
State	Governor	Party	First elected	Status	Candidates
Arizona	Sidney Preston Osborn	Democratic	1940	Incumbent re-elected.	▌ ✓ Sidney Preston Osborn (Democratic) 77.9%; ▌Jerrie W. Lee (Republican) 21.2%; ▌Charles R. Osburn (Prohibition) 0.9%
Arkansas	Homer Martin Adkins	Democratic	1940	Incumbent retired. Democratic hold.	▌ ✓ Benjamin T. Laney (Democratic) 86.0%; ▌ Harley C. Stump (Republican) 14.0%
Colorado	John Charles Vivian	Republican	1942	Incumbent re-elected.	▌ ✓ John Charles Vivian (Republican) 52.4%; ▌Roy Phelix Best (Democratic) 47.6%
Connecticut	Raymond E. Baldwin	Republican	1942	Incumbent re-elected.	▌ ✓ Raymond E. Baldwin (Republican) 50.5%; ▌ Robert A. Hurley (Democratic) 47.4%; ▌Jasper McLevy (Socialist) 2.0%; ▌Joseph C. Borden Jr. (Socialist Labor) 0.2%
Delaware	Walter W. Bacon	Republican	1940	Incumbent re-elected.	▌ ✓ Walter W. Bacon (Republican) 50.5%; ▌Isaac J. MacCollum (Democratic) 49.2%; ▌Thomas W. Jakes (Prohibition) 0.3%
Florida	Spessard Holland	Democratic	1940	Incumbent term-limited. Democratic hold.	▌ ✓ Millard Caldwell (Democratic) 79.0%; ▌ Bert L. Acker (Republican) 21.0%
Idaho	C. A. Bottolfsen	Republican	1938; 1940 (lost); 1942	Incumbent retired. Democratic gain.	▌ ✓ Charles C. Gossett (Democratic) 52.6%; ▌ W. H. Detwiler (Republican) 47.4%
Illinois	Dwight H. Green	Republican	1940	Incumbent re-elected.	▌ ✓ Dwight H. Green (Republican) 50.8%; ▌ Thomas J. Courtney (Democratic) 49.0%; ▌ Charles Storm (Socialist Labor) 0.2%; ▌ Willis R. Wilson (Prohibition) 0.1%
Indiana	Henry F. Schricker	Democratic	1940	Incumbent term-limited. Republican gain.	▌ ✓ Ralph F. Gates (Republican) 51.0%; ▌ Samuel D. Jackson (Democratic) 48.2%; ▌ Waldo E. Yeater (Prohibition) 0.7%; ▌ William Rabe (Socialist) 0.1%
Iowa	Bourke B. Hickenlooper	Republican	1940	Incumbent retired. Republican hold.	▌ ✓ Robert D. Blue (Republican) 56.0%; ▌ R. F. Mitchell (Democratic) 43.6%; ▌Glen Williamson (Prohibition) 0.3%; ▌ Hugh Bockewitz (Socialist) 0.1%
Kansas	Andrew Frank Schoeppel	Republican	1942	Incumbent re-elected.	▌ ✓ Andrew Frank Schoeppel (Republican) 65.7%; ▌ Robert S. Lemon (Democratic) 32.8%; ▌ David C. White (Prohibition) 1.1%; ▌ W. W. Tamplin (Socialist) 0.3%
Maine	Sumner Sewall	Republican	1940	Incumbent retired. Republican hold.	▌ ✓ Horace Hildreth (Republican) 70.3%; ▌ Paul Julien (Democratic) 29.7%
Massachusetts	Leverett Saltonstall	Republican	1938	Incumbent retired. Democratic gain.	▌ ✓ Maurice J. Tobin (Democratic) 53.6%; ▌ Horace T. Cahill (Republican) 46.0%; ▌Henning A. Blomen (Socialist Labor) 0.3%; ▌Guy S. Williams (Prohibition) 0.2%
Michigan	Harry Kelly	Republican	1942	Incumbent re-elected.	▌ ✓ Harry Kelly (Republican) 54.7%; ▌ Edward J. Fry (Democratic) 44.8%; ▌Seth A. Davey (Prohibition) 0.3%; ▌Forest Odell (Socialist) 0.1%; ▌Leland Marion (America First) 0.1%; ▌Theos A. Grove (Socialist Labor) 0.1%
Minnesota	Edward J. Thye	Republican	1943 (Note: Thye became governor in 1943 after predecessor (Harold Stassen) resigned.)	Incumbent elected to serve a full term.	▌ ✓ Edward J. Thye (Republican) 61.6%; ▌ Byron G. Allen (DFL) 37.8%; ▌Gerald M. York (Industrial Government) 0.6%
Missouri	Forrest C. Donnell	Republican	1940	Incumbent term-limited. Democratic gain.	▌ ✓ Phil M. Donnelly (Democratic) 50.94%; ▌ Jean Paul Bradshaw (Republican) 48.97%; ▌ W. F. Rinck (Socialist) 0.08%; ▌ Stephen Tendler (Socialist Labor) 0.01%
Montana	Sam C. Ford	Republican	1940	Incumbent re-elected.	▌ ✓ Sam C. Ford (Republican) 56.4%; ▌ Leif Erickson (Democratic) 43.2%; ▌Charles R. Miller (Prohibition) 0.5%
Nebraska	Dwight Griswold	Republican	1940	Incumbent re-elected.	▌ ✓ Dwight Griswold (Republican) 76.1%; ▌ George W. Olsen (Democratic) 23.9%
New Hampshire	Robert O. Blood	Republican	1940	Incumbent lost renomination. Republican hold.	▌ ✓ Charles M. Dale (Republican) 53.1%; ▌ James J. Powers (Democratic) 46.9%
New Mexico	John J. Dempsey	Democratic	1942	Incumbent re-elected.	▌ ✓ John J. Dempsey (Democratic) 51.9%; ▌ Carroll G. Gunderson (Republican) 48.2%
North Carolina	J. Melville Broughton	Democratic	1940	Incumbent term-limited. Democratic hold.	▌ ✓ R. Gregg Cherry (Democratic) 69.6%; ▌ Frank C. Patton (Republican) 30.4%
North Dakota	John Moses	Democratic	1938	Incumbent retired. Republican gain.	▌ ✓ Fred G. Aandahl (Republican) 52.0%; ▌ William T. Depuy (Democratic) 28.9%; ▌ Alvin C. Strutz (Independent) 18.8%; ▌ A. M. Wiley (Prohibition) 0.3%
Ohio	John W. Bricker	Republican	1938	Incumbent retired. Democratic gain.	▌ ✓ Frank Lausche (Democratic) 51.8%; ▌ James Garfield Stewart (Republican) 48.2%
Rhode Island	J. Howard McGrath	Democratic	1940	Incumbent re-elected.	▌ ✓ J. Howard McGrath (Democratic) 60.7%; ▌ Norman D. MacLeod (Republican) 39.4%
South Dakota	Merrell Q. Sharpe	Republican	1942	Incumbent re-elected.	▌ ✓ Merrell Q. Sharpe (Republican) 65.5%; ▌ Lynn Fellows (Democratic) 34.5%
Tennessee	Prentice Cooper	Democratic	1938	Incumbent retired. Democratic hold.	▌ ✓ Jim Nance McCord (Democratic) 62.5%; ▌ John W. Kilgo (Republican) 36.0%; ▌ John Randolph Neal Jr. (Independent) 1.5%
Texas	Coke R. Stevenson	Democratic	1941 (Note: Stevenson became governor in 1941 after predecessor (W. Lee O'Daniel) resigned. He was subsequently elected to a full term in 1942.)	Incumbent re-elected.	▌ ✓ Coke R. Stevenson (Democratic) 91.0%; ▌ B. J. Peasley (Republican) 9.0%
Utah	Herbert B. Maw	Democratic	1940	Incumbent re-elected.	▌ ✓ Herbert B. Maw (Democratic) 50.21%; ▌ J. Bracken Lee (Republican) 49.79%
Vermont	William Henry Wills	Republican	1940	Incumbent retired. Republican hold.	▌ ✓ Mortimer Proctor (Republican) 65.9%; ▌ Ernest H. Bailey (Democratic) 34.1%
Washington	Arthur B. Langlie	Republican	1940	Incumbent lost re-election. Democratic gain.	▌ ✓ Monrad Wallgren (Democratic) 51.5%; ▌ Arthur B. Langlie (Republican) 48.1%; ▌Allen Emerson (Communist) 0.2%; ▌Henry E.O. Gusey (Socialist Labor) 0.16%
West Virginia	Matthew M. Neely	Democratic	1940	Incumbent term-limited. Democratic hold.	▌ ✓ Clarence W. Meadows (Democratic) 54.4%; ▌ Daniel Boone Dawson (Republican) 45.6%
Wisconsin	Walter Samuel Goodland	Republican	1943 (Note: Goodland became governor in 1943 after governor-elect Orland Steen Loomis died before taking office. The Wisconsin Supreme Court ruled that as lieutenant governor, Goodland was next in the line of succession following the term of outgoing governor Julius P. Heil.)	Incumbent elected to full term.	▌ ✓ Walter Samuel Goodland (Republican) 52.8%; ▌Daniel Hoan (Democratic) 40.6%; ▌ Alexander O. Benz (Progressive) 5.8%; ▌George A. Nelson (Socialist) 0.7%; ▌Georgia Cozzini (Socialist Labor) 0.09%

== Closest races ==
States where the margin of victory was under 5%:

1. Utah, 0.42%
2. Delaware, 1.33%
3. Illinois, 1.82%
4. Missouri, 1.97%
5. Indiana, 2.79%
6. Connecticut, 3.12%
7. Washington, 3.39%
8. New Mexico, 3.62%
9. Ohio, 3.63%
10. Colorado, 4.80%

States where the margin of victory was under 10%:

1. Idaho, 5.3%
2. New Hampshire, 6.2%
3. Massachusetts, 7.7%
4. West Virginia, 8.9%
5. Michigan, 9.9%

Red denotes states won by Republicans. Blue denotes states won by Democrats.

== See also ==
- 1944 United States elections
  - 1944 United States presidential election
  - 1944 United States Senate elections
  - 1944 United States House of Representatives elections
