= 1938 United States gubernatorial elections =

- November 8, 1938; September 12, 1938 (ME)

33 governorships
| | Majority party | Minority party |
|---|---|---|
| Party | Democratic | Republican |
| Seats before | 39 | 6 |
| Seats after | 30 | 18 |
| Seat change | ▼9 | ▲12 |
| Seats up | 24 | 6 |
| Seats won | 15 | 18 |
| | Third party | Fourth party |
| Party | Farmer–Labor | Progressive |
| Seats before | 1 | 1 |
| Seats after | 0 | 0 |
| Seat change | ▼1 | ▼1 |
| Seats up | 1 | 1 |
| Seats won | 0 | 0 |
| | Fifth party |
| Party | Non-Partisan League |
| Seats before | 1 |
| Seats after | 0 |
| Seat change | ▼1 |
| Seats up | 1 |
| Seats won | 0 |
- Democratic gain Democratic hold Republican gain Republican hold

United States gubernatorial elections were held in 1938, in 33 states, concurrent with the House and Senate elections, on November 8, 1938. Elections took place on September 12 in Maine.

Governor Herbert H. Lehman was only able to win reelection due to the votes he received on the American Labor Party's ballot line. In New York, the governor was elected to a 4-year term for the first time, instead of a 2-year term.

== Results ==
| State | Incumbent | Party | Status | Opposing candidates |
|---|---|---|---|---|
| Alabama | Bibb Graves | Democratic | Term-limited, Democratic victory | Frank Dixon (Democratic) 87.52% W. A. Clardy (Republican) 12.48% |
| Arizona | Rawghlie Clement Stanford | Democratic | Retired, Democratic victory | Robert Taylor Jones (Democratic) 68.57% Jerrie W. Lee (Republican) 27.33% James H. Kerby (Independent Democrat) 4.11% |
| Arkansas | Carl E. Bailey | Democratic | Re-elected, 86.32% | Charles F. Cole (Independent) 8.78% Walter S. McNutt (Republican) 4.89% |
| California | Frank Merriam | Republican | Defeated, 44.17% | Culbert Olson (Democratic) 52.49% Raymond L. Haight (Progressive) 2.43% Robert Noble (Commonwealth) 0.90% Scattering 0.02% |
| Colorado | Teller Ammons | Democratic | Defeated, 40.02% | Ralph Lawrence Carr (Republican) 59.50% Jack R. White (National Union) 0.25% Harvey L. Mayfield (Royal Way) 0.23% |
| Connecticut | Wilbur Lucius Cross | Democratic | Defeated, 36.00% | Raymond E. Baldwin (Republican) 36.43% Jasper McLevy (Socialist) 26.30% Joseph C. Borden Jr. (Socialist Labor) 1.15% Devere Allen (Labor) 0.12% |
| Georgia | Eurith D. Rivers | Democratic | Re-elected, 94.28% | E. S. Fuller (Independent) 2.70% L. P. Glass (Prohibition) 1.92% Alexander Stephens Mitchell (Independent) 1.11% (Democratic primary results); Eurith D. Rivers 50.72% Hugh Howell 42.40% J. J. Mangham 6.18% Robert F. Wood 0.70% |
| Idaho | Barzilla W. Clark | Democratic | Defeated in Democratic primary, Republican victory | C. A. Bottolfsen (Republican) 57.30% C. Ben Ross (Democratic) 41.89% R. B. Wilson (National Progressive) 0.81% |
| Iowa | Nelson G. Kraschel | Democratic | Defeated, 45.72% | George A. Wilson (Republican) 52.71% Wallace M. Short (Farmer Labor) 1.20% John F. Wirds (Progressive) 0.25% J. Alvin Mitchell (Prohibition) 0.13% |
| Kansas | Walter A. Huxman | Democratic | Defeated, 45.13% | Payne Ratner (Republican) 52.10% Jonathan M. Davis (Independent) 1.99% C. Floyd Hester (Prohibition) 0.57% Ida A. Beloof (Socialist) 0.20% |
| Maine (held, 12 September 1938) | Lewis O. Barrows | Republican | Re-elected, 52.89% | Louis J. Brann (Democratic) 47.02% Winfred Tabbutt (Communist) 0.10% |
| Maryland | Harry Nice | Republican | Defeated, 42.88% | Herbert O'Conor (Democratic) 54.62% Herbert Brune (Independent) 1.33% Joshua C. Gwin (Union) 0.75% David W. Eyman (Socialist) 0.17% Robert Kadish (Labor) 0.13% Samuel Gordon (Communist) 0.11% |
| Massachusetts | Charles F. Hurley | Democratic | Defeated in Democratic primary, Republican victory | Leverett Saltonstall (Republican) 53.32% James Michael Curley (Democratic) 44.96% William McMasters (Townsend Party) 0.41% Jeffrey W. Campbell (Socialist) 0.32% Henning A. Blomen (Socialist Labor) 0.22% Otis Archer Hood (Communist) 0.20% Roland S. Bruneau (Independent) 0.19% |
| Michigan | Frank Murphy | Democratic | Defeated, 46.96% | Frank Fitzgerald (Republican) 52.78% Nahum Burnett (Socialist) 0.18% Clayton O’Donohue (Socialist Labor) 0.03% Scattering 0.05% |
| Minnesota | Elmer Austin Benson | Farmer-Labor | Defeated, 34.18% | Harold Stassen (Republican) 59.92% Thomas F. Gallagher (Democratic) 5.82% John William Castle (Industrial) 0.08% |
| Nebraska | Roy Cochran | Democratic | Re-elected, 44.03% | Charles J. Warner (Republican) 40.63% Charles W. Bryan (Independent) 15.35% |
| Nevada | Richard Kirman Sr. | Democratic | Retired, Democratic victory | Edward P. Carville (Democratic) 61.86% John A. Fulton (Republican) 38.14% |
| New Hampshire | Francis P. Murphy | Republican | Re-elected, 57.08% | John L. Sullivan (Democratic) 42.79% Elba K. Chase (Communist) 0.13% |
| New Mexico | Clyde Tingley | Democratic | Term-limited, Democratic victory | John E. Miles (Democratic) 52.24% Albert K. Mitchell (Republican) 47.59% J. D. Shuster (Independent) 0.17% |
| New York | Herbert H. Lehman | Democratic | Re-elected, 50.38% | Thomas E. Dewey (Republican) 49.02% Norman M. Thomas (Socialist) 0.53% Aaron M. Orange (Industrial Government) 0.07% |
| North Dakota | William Langer | Non-Partisan League | Retired to run for U.S. Senate, Democratic victory | John Moses (Democratic) 52.47% John N. Hagan (Republican) 47.53% |
| Ohio | Martin L. Davey | Democratic | Defeated in Democratic primary, Republican victory | John W. Bricker (Republican) 52.45% Charles Sawyer (Democratic) 47.55% |
| Oklahoma | E. W. Marland | Democratic | Term-limited, Democratic victory | Leon C. Phillips (Democratic) 70.03% Ross Rizley (Republican) 29.31% John Wesley Lanham (Prohibition) 0.51% John Franing (Independent) 0.15% |
| Oregon | Charles Martin | Democratic | Defeated in Democratic primary, Republican victory | Charles A. Sprague (Republican) 57.40% Henry L. Hess (Democratic) 42.59% Scattering 0.02% |
| Pennsylvania | George Howard Earle III | Democratic | Term-limited, Republican victory | Arthur James (Republican) 53.39% Charles Alvin Jones (Democratic) 46.07% Jesse H. Holmes (Socialist) 0.33% Robert G. Burnham (Prohibition) 0.17% Ella Reeve Bloor Omholt (Communist) 0.03% |
| Rhode Island | Robert E. Quinn | Democratic | Defeated, 41.63% | William Henry Vanderbilt III (Republican) 54.17% Walter E. O'Hara (Square Deal) 4.08% Morris Kominsky (Communist) 0.12% |
| South Carolina | Olin D. Johnston | Democratic | Term-limited, Democratic victory | Burnet R. Maybank (Democratic) 99.43% Joseph A. Tolbert (Republican) 0.57% (Democratic primary run-off results); Burnet Rhett Maybank 52.33% Wyndham Meredith Manning 47.67% |
| South Dakota | Leslie Jensen | Republican | Retired to run for U.S. Senate, Republican victory | Harlan J. Bushfield (Republican) 53.95% Oscar Fosheim (Democratic) 46.05% |
| Tennessee | Gordon Browning | Democratic | Defeated in Democratic primary, Democratic victory | Prentice Cooper (Democratic) 71.72% Howard Baker Sr. (Republican) 28.28% |
| Texas | James V. Allred | Democratic | Retired, Democratic victory | W. Lee O'Daniel (Democratic) 96.82% A. Boynton (Republican) 3.05% Earl E. Miller (Socialist) 0.08% Homer Brooks (Communist) 0.06% |
| Vermont | George D. Aiken | Republican | Re-elected, 66.75% | Fred C. Martin (Democratic) 33.25% |
| Wisconsin | Philip La Follette | Progressive | Defeated, 36.00% | Julius P. Heil (Republican) 55.39% Harry W. Bolens (Democratic) 7.99% Frank W. Smith (Union) 0.47% John Schleier Jr. (Independent) 0.15% |
| Wyoming | Leslie A. Miller | Democratic | Defeated, 40.19% | Nels H. Smith (Republican) 59.81% |

== See also ==
- 1938 United States elections
  - 1938 United States Senate elections
  - 1938 United States House of Representatives elections
