= List of governors of Arizona =

Governor of Arizona
- Seal of Arizona

- Flag of Arizona

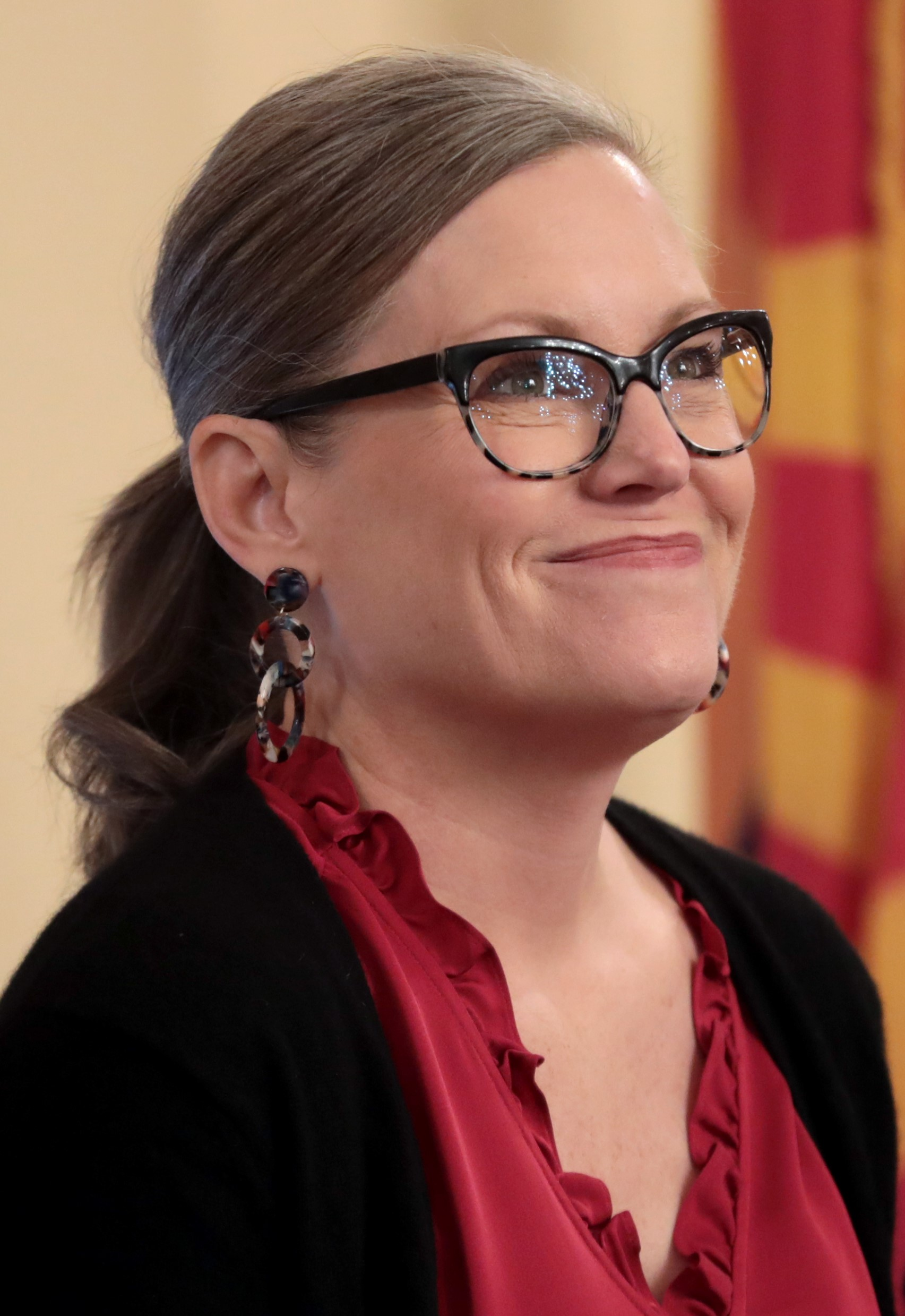
- Incumbent; Katie Hobbs since January 2, 2023
- Government of Arizona
- Style: Governor (informal); The Honorable (formal); Her Excellency (formal)
- Status: Chief executive; Head of government; Commander-in-chief
- Residence: No official residence
- Term length: Four years, renewable once consecutively
- Constituting instrument: Constitution of Arizona
- Inaugural holder: George W. P. Hunt
- Formation: February 14, 1912
- Succession: Line of succession
- Deputy: None (until 2027); Lieutenant Governor (from 2027)
- Salary: $95,000 (2022)
- Website: azgovernor.gov

The governor of Arizona is the head of government of the U.S. state of Arizona. As the top elected official, the governor is the head of the executive branch of the Arizona state government and is charged with faithfully executing state laws. The governor has the power to either approve or veto bills passed by the Arizona State Legislature; to convene the legislature; and to grant pardons, with the exception of cases of impeachment. The governor is also the commander-in-chief of the state's military forces. Arizona is one of the few states that currently does not have a governor's mansion or other official residence.

Twenty-four people have served as governor over 28 distinct terms. All of the repeat governors were in the state's earliest years, when George W. P. Hunt and Thomas Edward Campbell alternated as governor for 17 years and, after a two-year gap, Hunt served another term. One governor, Evan Mecham, was impeached by the Arizona House of Representatives and subsequently removed from office following his conviction in the Arizona Senate. Another, Fife Symington, resigned upon being convicted of a felony. The longest-serving governor was Hunt, who was elected seven times and served just under fourteen years. The longest single stint was that of Bruce Babbitt, who was elected to two four-year terms after succeeding to the office following the death of his predecessor, Wesley Bolin, serving nearly nine years total. Bolin had the shortest tenure, dying less than five months after succeeding as governor. Arizona has had five female governors, the most in the United States, and was the first—and until 2019 (when Michelle Lujan Grisham succeeded Susana Martinez in neighboring New Mexico) the only—state where female governors served consecutively.

The current governor as of January 2, 2023, is Democrat Katie Hobbs.

== List of governors ==
=== Confederate Arizona ===
In Tucson between April 2 and April 5, 1860, a convention of settlers from the southern half of New Mexico Territory drafted a provisional constitution for "Arizona Territory", three years before the United States would create such a territory. This proposed territory consisted of the part of New Mexico Territory south of 33° 40' north. On April 2, they elected a governor, Lewis S. Owings. The provisional territory was to exist until such time as an official territory was created, but that proposal was rejected by Congress at the time.

On March 16, 1861, soon before the American Civil War broke out, a convention in Mesilla voted that the provisional territory should secede from the Union and join the Confederacy. Lewis S. Owings remained on as the provisional governor of the territory.

The Confederacy took ownership of the territory on August 1, 1861, when forces led by Lieutenant Colonel John R. Baylor won decisive control of the territory, and Baylor proclaimed himself governor. Arizona Territory was formally organized in the Confederacy on January 18, 1862. On March 20, 1862, Baylor issued an order to kill all the adult Apache and take their children into slavery. When Confederate President Jefferson Davis learned of this order, he strongly disapproved and demanded an explanation. Baylor wrote a letter December 29, 1862, to justify his decision, and after this was received, Davis relieved Baylor of his post and commission, calling his letter an "avowal of an infamous crime". By that time, the Confederate government of Arizona Territory was in exile in San Antonio, Texas, as the territory had been effectively lost to Union forces in July 1862; no new governor was appointed.

=== Territory of Arizona ===
Arizona Territory was formed on February 24, 1863, from New Mexico Territory, remaining a territory for 49 years.

Governors of the Territory of Arizona
No.	Governor	Term in office (Note: The range given is from the date the governor was confirmed by the Senate, or appointed by the President during a Senate recess, to the date the governor's successor was confirmed, unless noted.)	Appointed by
—	John A. Gurley (1813–1863)	March 10, 1863 – August 19, 1863 (died before taking office) (Note: Gurley was nominated on March 7, 1863, and was confirmed by the Senate on March 10, but died on August 19, before he could take office.)	Abraham Lincoln
1	John N. Goodwin (1824–1887)	August 21, 1863 (Note: Goodwin was appointed on August 21, 1863, during a Senate recess; nominated on January 7, 1864; and confirmed by the Senate on February 4, 1864. He established the territorial government on December 29, 1863.) – April 10, 1866 (964 days; resigned) (Note: Goodwin resigned, having been elected to the United States House of Representatives for a term which began on March 4, 1865; he held both offices for thirteen months.)	Abraham Lincoln
2	Richard C. McCormick (1832–1901)	April 10, 1866 (Note: McCormick was nominated on March 14, 1866, confirmed by the Senate on April 10, and he took office on July 9.) – March 4, 1869 (1060 days; resigned) (Note: McCormick resigned, having been elected to the United States House of Representatives. While he took office on March 4, 1869, at least one contemporary report said he resigned from the governorship on March 3.)	Andrew Johnson
3	Anson P. K. Safford (1830–1891)	April 8, 1869 (Note: Safford was nominated on April 3, 1869, confirmed by the Senate on April 8, and took office on July 9. He was reconfirmed by the Senate on March 18, 1873.) – April 5, 1877 (2920 days; replaced) (Note: While some sources say Safford resigned due to health and personal concerns, President Hayes' nomination of his successor John Philo Hoyt specified, "vice A. P. K. Safford, whose term of office has expired.")	Ulysses S. Grant
4	John Philo Hoyt (1841–1926)	April 5, 1877 (Note: Hoyt was appointed on April 5, 1877, during a Senate recess; nominated on October 17, and confirmed by the Senate on October 29. Despite already being in the territory when appointed, he did not take office until May 30, due to involvement as secretary of the territory in litigation over moving the territorial capital.) – June 14, 1878 (436 days; resigned) (Note: McMullin & Walker state that Hoyt was asked to resign on June 11, 1878, the day Hayes nominated Hoyt to be governor of Idaho Territory and Frémont to succeed him as governor of Arizona Territory.)	Rutherford B. Hayes
5	John C. Frémont (1813–1890)	June 14, 1878 (Note: Frémont was nominated on June 11, 1878, confirmed by the Senate on June 14, and took office on October 6.) – October 11, 1881 (1216 days; resigned) (Note: Frémont resigned; he spent little time in the territory, and the Secretary of the Territory eventually asked him to resume his duties or resign, and he chose resignation.)	Rutherford B. Hayes
6	Frederick Augustus Tritle (1833–1906)	February 6, 1882 (Note: Tritle was nominated on January 27, 1882, confirmed by the Senate on February 6, and took office on March 8.) – October 7, 1885 (1340 days; resigned) (Note: Tritle resigned after Grover Cleveland was elected president, so that the Democrat could appoint a Democrat as governor.)	Chester A. Arthur
7	C. Meyer Zulick (1839–1926)	October 15, 1885 (Note: Zulick was appointed on October 15, 1885, during a Senate recess; nominated on December 10, 1885; and confirmed by the Senate on May 5, 1886. He took office on November 2, 1885.) – March 28, 1889 (1261 days; replaced)	Grover Cleveland
8	Lewis Wolfley (1839–1910)	March 28, 1889 (Note: Wolfley was nominated on March 14, 1889, confirmed by the Senate on March 28, and took office on April 8.) – August 20, 1890 (511 days; resigned) (Note: Wolfley resigned due to a disagreement with the federal government on arid land policy.)	Benjamin Harrison
9	John N. Irwin (1844–1905)	October 1, 1890 (Note: Irwin was nominated on September 29, 1890, confirmed by the Senate on October 1, 1890, and took office on January 20, 1891.) – April 19, 1892 (567 days; resigned) (Note: Irwin resigned to handle family business out of state.)	Benjamin Harrison
10	Oakes Murphy (1849–1908)	May 9, 1892 (Note: Murphy was nominated on April 22, 1892, and confirmed by the Senate on May 9. As he was secretary of the territory, he did not take office until his successor to that office was confirmed, which occurred on June 2.) – April 8, 1893 (335 days; replaced) (Note: While some sources say Murphy resigned before Hughes took office, contemporary news reported that Murphy handed the office directly to Hughes on April 13, 1893.)	Benjamin Harrison
11	L. C. Hughes (1842–1915)	April 8, 1893 (Note: Hughes was nominated on April 5, 1893, confirmed by the Senate on April 8, and took office on April 13.) – April 8, 1896 (1097 days; replaced) (Note: Hughes had abolished many territorial offices, and unhappy officials successfully petitioned President Cleveland to remove him.)	Grover Cleveland
12	Benjamin J. Franklin (1839–1898)	April 8, 1896 (Note: Franklin was nominated on March 30, 1896, confirmed by the Senate on April 8, and took office on April 18.) – July 17, 1897 (466 days; replaced) (Note: His successor having been sworn in out of state, and given instruction from the federal government, Franklin resigned the office on July 22 and handed over duties to the secretary of the territory, Charles H. Akers.)	Grover Cleveland
13	Myron H. McCord (1840–1908)	July 17, 1897 (Note: McCord was nominated on May 20, 1897, and confirmed on July 17. He was sworn in as governor in Virginia on July 21, though Charles H. Akers was still acting governor of the territory until McCord arrived on July 28.) – July 16, 1898 (365 days; resigned) (Note: McCord resigned to serve in the Spanish–American War.)	William McKinley
14	Oakes Murphy (1849–1908)	July 16, 1898 (Note: Murphy was appointed on July 16, 1898, during a Senate recess; nominated on December 8; and confirmed by the Senate on December 14. He took office on August 1.) – May 14, 1902 (1398 days; resigned) (Note: Murphy was asked by President Theodore Roosevelt to resign for opposing the Newlands Reclamation Act; he submitted his resignation in April 1902 to take effect June 30, and remained until his successor took office the next day.)	William McKinley
15	Alexander Oswald Brodie (1849–1918)	May 14, 1902 (Note: Brodie was nominated on May 7, 1902 for a term to begin July 1, confirmed by the Senate on May 14, and took office on July 1.) – February 14, 1905 (1008 days; resigned) (Note: Brodie resigned, having been appointed assistant chief of the records and pension bureau at the United States Department of War.)	Theodore Roosevelt
16	Joseph Henry Kibbey (1853–1924)	February 27, 1905 (Note: Kibbey was nominated on February 10, 1905, confirmed by the Senate on February 27, and took office on March 7, for a term to expire February 27, 1909. Though he was renominated on December 16, 1908, the Senate did not confirm him before the end of the session.) – April 15, 1909 (1509 days; replaced)	Theodore Roosevelt
17	Richard Elihu Sloan (1857–1933)	April 15, 1909 (Note: Sloan was nominated on April 8, 1909, confirmed by the Senate on April 15, and took office on May 1.) – February 14, 1912 (1036 days; statehood)	William Howard Taft

=== State of Arizona ===
The state of Arizona was admitted to the Union on February 14, 1912, the last of the contiguous states to be admitted.

The state constitution of 1912 called for the election of a governor every two years. The term was increased to four years by a 1968 amendment. The constitution originally included no term limit, but an amendment passed in 1992 allows governors to succeed themselves only once; before this, four governors were elected more than twice in a row. Gubernatorial terms begin on the first Monday in the January following the election. Governors who have served the two term limit can run again after four years out of office.

Arizona was one of the few states without a lieutenant governor, but pursuant to a 2022 amendment to the constitution, the office will be first filled with the 2026 election. The lieutenant governor would become governor in the event of a vacancy in the office. Nominees are be chosen by each party's gubernatorial nominee, and then run on a joint ticket. If the offices of governor and the lieutenant governor become vacant at the same time, the constitution provides the secretary of state, attorney general, state treasurer or the superintendent of public instruction would be the line of succession to assume the office of governor, and then appoint the lieutenant governor pending state legislative approval.

Prior to this, the line of succession reached beyond the secretary of state only once, when Attorney General Bruce Babbitt became governor upon the death of Wesley Bolin. Rose Mofford had been appointed secretary of state to replace Bolin after Bolin succeeded to the governorship. Bolin had become governor when Raúl Héctor Castro resigned to accept appointment as ambassador to Argentina. Mofford later became acting governor after Evan Mecham was impeached by the House of Representatives, and succeeded to the governorship when Mecham was removed from office after his conviction by the Senate.

Governors of the State of Arizona
No. (Note: The governor's website labeled Katie Hobbs as the 24th governor; based on this, each governor is numbered only once, regardless of how many distinct terms they served. Repeat terms are listed with the governor's original number in italics.)	Governor	Term in office	Party	Election	Lt. Governor (Note: The office of Lieutenant Governor was created in 2022 and will be first filled in the 2026 election.) (Note: Lieutenant governors represented the same party as their governor unless noted.)
1	George W. P. Hunt (1859–1934)	February 14, 1912 – January 1, 1917 (1784 days; lost election) (Note: Initial results showed that Campbell had won by 30 votes, but Hunt challenged the results, claiming that several precincts had experienced fraudulent voting. The Arizona Supreme Court named Campbell governor on January 27, 1917, and forced Hunt to surrender his office. Hunt continued fighting in court, and on December 22, was declared the winner of the election by 43 votes. Campbell vacated the office three days later.)	Democratic	1911	Office did not exist
1	George W. P. Hunt (1859–1934)	February 14, 1912 – January 1, 1917 (1784 days; lost election)	Democratic	1914	Office did not exist
2	Thomas Edward Campbell (1878–1944)	January 1, 1917 – December 25, 1917 (359 days, removed)	Republican	1916	Office did not exist
1	George W. P. Hunt (1859–1934)	December 25, 1917 – January 6, 1919 (378 days; retired)	Democratic	1916	Office did not exist
2	Thomas Edward Campbell (1878–1944)	January 6, 1919 – January 1, 1923 (1457 days; lost election)	Republican	1918	Office did not exist
2	Thomas Edward Campbell (1878–1944)	January 6, 1919 – January 1, 1923 (1457 days; lost election)	Republican	1920	Office did not exist
1	George W. P. Hunt (1859–1934)	January 1, 1923 – January 7, 1929 (2199 days; lost election)	Democratic	1922	Office did not exist
1	George W. P. Hunt (1859–1934)	January 1, 1923 – January 7, 1929 (2199 days; lost election)	Democratic	1924	Office did not exist
1	George W. P. Hunt (1859–1934)	January 1, 1923 – January 7, 1929 (2199 days; lost election)	Democratic	1926	Office did not exist
3	John Calhoun Phillips (1870–1943)	January 7, 1929 – January 5, 1931 (729 days; lost election)	Republican	1928	Office did not exist
1	George W. P. Hunt (1859–1934)	January 5, 1931 – January 2, 1933 (729 days; lost nomination)	Democratic	1930	Office did not exist
4	Benjamin Baker Moeur (1869–1937)	January 2, 1933 – January 4, 1937 (1464 days; lost nomination)	Democratic	1932	Office did not exist
4	Benjamin Baker Moeur (1869–1937)	January 2, 1933 – January 4, 1937 (1464 days; lost nomination)	Democratic	1934	Office did not exist
5	Rawghlie Clement Stanford (1879–1963)	January 4, 1937 – January 2, 1939 (729 days; retired)	Democratic	1936	Office did not exist
6	Robert Taylor Jones (1884–1958)	January 2, 1939 – January 6, 1941 (736 days; lost nomination)	Democratic	1938	Office did not exist
7	Sidney Preston Osborn (1884–1948)	January 6, 1941 – May 25, 1948 (2697 days; died in office)	Democratic	1940	Office did not exist
7	Sidney Preston Osborn (1884–1948)	January 6, 1941 – May 25, 1948 (2697 days; died in office)	Democratic	1942	Office did not exist
7	Sidney Preston Osborn (1884–1948)	January 6, 1941 – May 25, 1948 (2697 days; died in office)	Democratic	1944	Office did not exist
7	Sidney Preston Osborn (1884–1948)	January 6, 1941 – May 25, 1948 (2697 days; died in office)	Democratic	1946	Office did not exist
8	Dan Edward Garvey (1886–1974)	May 25, 1948 – January 1, 1951 (952 days; lost nomination) (Note: Garvey lost the Democratic nomination to Ana Frohmiller.)	Democratic	Succeeded from secretary of state	Office did not exist
8	Dan Edward Garvey (1886–1974)	May 25, 1948 – January 1, 1951 (952 days; lost nomination)	Democratic	1948	Office did not exist
9	J. Howard Pyle (1906–1987)	January 1, 1951 – January 3, 1955 (1464 days; lost election)	Republican	1950	Office did not exist
9	J. Howard Pyle (1906–1987)	January 1, 1951 – January 3, 1955 (1464 days; lost election)	Republican	1952	Office did not exist
10	Ernest McFarland (1894–1984)	January 3, 1955 – January 5, 1959 (1464 days; retired) (Note: McFarland instead ran unsuccessfully for the United States Senate.)	Democratic	1954	Office did not exist
10	Ernest McFarland (1894–1984)	January 3, 1955 – January 5, 1959 (1464 days; retired)	Democratic	1956	Office did not exist
11	Paul Fannin (1907–2002)	January 5, 1959 – January 4, 1965 (2192 days; retired) (Note: Fannin was instead elected for the United States Senate.)	Republican	1958	Office did not exist
11	Paul Fannin (1907–2002)	January 5, 1959 – January 4, 1965 (2192 days; retired)	Republican	1960	Office did not exist
11	Paul Fannin (1907–2002)	January 5, 1959 – January 4, 1965 (2192 days; retired)	Republican	1962	Office did not exist
12	Sam Goddard Jr. (1919–2006)	January 4, 1965 – January 2, 1967 (729 days; lost election)	Democratic	1964	Office did not exist
13	Jack Williams (1909–1998)	January 2, 1967 – January 6, 1975 (2927 days; retired) (Note: Sobel & Raimo say that Williams lost the 1974 election, but that was someone with a similar name, Russell Williams.)	Republican	1966	Office did not exist
13	Jack Williams (1909–1998)	January 2, 1967 – January 6, 1975 (2927 days; retired)	Republican	1968	Office did not exist
13	Jack Williams (1909–1998)	January 2, 1967 – January 6, 1975 (2927 days; retired)	Republican	1970 (Note: First term under a constitutional amendment which lengthened terms to four years.)	Office did not exist
14	Raúl Héctor Castro (1916–2015)	January 6, 1975 – October 20, 1977 (1019 days; resigned) (Note: Castro resigned, having been confirmed as United States Ambassador to Argentina.)	Democratic	1974	Office did not exist
15	Wesley Bolin (1909–1978)	October 20, 1977 – March 4, 1978 (136 days; died in office)	Democratic	Succeeded from secretary of state	Office did not exist
16	Bruce Babbitt (b. 1938)	March 4, 1978 – January 5, 1987 (3230 days; retired)	Democratic	Succeeded from attorney general (Note: The secretary of state at the time of Bolin's death had been appointed, not elected, and thus not in the line of succession according to the Arizona constitution, making Attorney General Babbitt governor.)	Office did not exist
16	Bruce Babbitt (b. 1938)	March 4, 1978 – January 5, 1987 (3230 days; retired)	Democratic	1978	Office did not exist
16	Bruce Babbitt (b. 1938)	March 4, 1978 – January 5, 1987 (3230 days; retired)	Democratic	1982	Office did not exist
17	Evan Mecham (1924–2008)	January 5, 1987 – April 4, 1988 (456 days; impeached and removed) (Note: Mecham was impeached and removed from office on charges of obstruction of justice and misuse of government funds, though he was later acquitted.)	Republican	1986	Office did not exist
18	Rose Mofford (1922–2016)	April 4, 1988 – March 6, 1991 (1067 days; retired)	Democratic	Succeeded from secretary of state	Office did not exist
19	Fife Symington (b. 1945)	March 6, 1991 – September 5, 1997 (2376 days; resigned) (Note: Symington resigned after being convicted of bank fraud; the conviction was later overturned and he was pardoned by President Bill Clinton.)	Republican	1990–1991 (Note: Arizona adopted runoff voting after Evan Mecham won with only 43% of the vote in 1986. The 1990 election was very close, and a runoff was held on February 26, 1991, which Symington won, and he was inaugurated on March 6.)	Office did not exist
19	Fife Symington (b. 1945)	March 6, 1991 – September 5, 1997 (2376 days; resigned)	Republican	1994	Office did not exist
20	Jane Dee Hull (1935–2020)	September 5, 1997 – January 6, 2003 (1950 days; term-limited) (Note: Under a 1992 amendment to the constitution, governors who have served two successive terms are not eligible again until another full term has passed.)	Republican	Succeeded from secretary of state	Office did not exist
20	Jane Dee Hull (1935–2020)	September 5, 1997 – January 6, 2003 (1950 days; term-limited)	Republican	1998	Office did not exist
21	Janet Napolitano (b. 1957)	January 6, 2003 – January 20, 2009 (2207 days; resigned) (Note: Napolitano resigned, having been confirmed as United States Secretary of Homeland Security.)	Democratic	2002	Office did not exist
21	Janet Napolitano (b. 1957)	January 6, 2003 – January 20, 2009 (2207 days; resigned)	Democratic	2006	Office did not exist
22	Jan Brewer (b. 1944)	January 20, 2009 – January 5, 2015 (2177 days; retired) (Note: There was a question as to whether Brewer, who had served part of one term and one full term, would be prohibited from running for a third term; she decided not to run.)	Republican	Succeeded from secretary of state	Office did not exist
22	Jan Brewer (b. 1944)	January 20, 2009 – January 5, 2015 (2177 days; retired)	Republican	2010	Office did not exist
23	Doug Ducey (b. 1964)	January 5, 2015 – January 2, 2023 (2920 days; term-limited)	Republican	2014	Office did not exist
23	Doug Ducey (b. 1964)	January 5, 2015 – January 2, 2023 (2920 days; term-limited)	Republican	2018	Office did not exist
24	Katie Hobbs (b. 1969)	January 2, 2023 – Incumbent (Note: Hobbs' term will expire on January 4, 2027; she was elected to a second term on November 3, 2026.) (in office 1421 days)	Democratic	2022	Office did not exist
24	Katie Hobbs (b. 1969)	January 2, 2023 – Incumbent (in office 1421 days)	Democratic	2026	John Giles (Note: Represented no party)

== Timeline ==
Timeline of Arizona governors

== See also ==
- Gubernatorial lines of succession in the United States § Arizona
- First ladies and gentlemen of Arizona
- Lieutenant Governor of Arizona
- List of Arizona state legislatures

== Sources ==
- "Former Arizona Governors". National Governors Association.
- "Arizona Governors". Governor of Arizona. Archived from the original on February 8, 2026.
- "Arizona Constitution". State Democracy Research Initiative. University of Wisconsin Law School.
- Glashan, Roy R. (1979). American Governors and Gubernatorial Elections, 1775-1978. Meckler Books. ISBN 0-7201-1511-6 – via Internet Archive.
- Kallenbach, Joseph E.; Kallenbach, Jessamine S. (1977). American State Governors, 1776-1976. Oceana Publications. ISBN 978-0-379-00665-0 – via Internet Archive.
- McMullin, Thomas A.; Walker, David (1984). Biographical Directory of American Territorial Governors. Meckler Publishing. ISBN 0-930466-11-X – via Internet Archive.
- Mullaney, Marie Marmo (1994). Biographical Directory of the Governors of the United States, 1988–1994. Greenwood Publishing Group. ISBN 0-313-28312-5 – via Internet Archive.
- Sobel, Robert; Raimo, John (1978). Biographical Directory of the Governors of the United States, 1789-1978. Vol. 1. Meckler Books. ISBN 0-930466-01-2 – via Internet Archive.
- Thorpe, Francis Newton, ed. (1909). The Federal and State Constitutions, Colonial Charters, and Other Organic Laws of the States, Territories, and Colonies Now or Heretofore Forming the United States of America. Vol. 1. United States Government Publishing Office – via Internet Archive.
- Colton, Ray Charles (1985). The Civil War in the Western Territories. University of Oklahoma Press. ISBN 0-8061-1902-0.
- Finch, L. Boyd (1985). "ARIZONA'S GOVERNORS WITHOUT PORTFOLIO: A Wonderfully Diverse Lot". The Journal of Arizona History. 26 (1): 77–99. ISSN 0021-9053. JSTOR 41859616.
- Goff, John S. (1978). Arizona Territorial Officials Volume II: The Governors 1863–1912. Black Mountain Press. OCLC 5100411.
- Goff, John S. (1985). Arizona Territorial Officials Volume III: The Delegates to Congress 1863–1912. Cave Creek, Arizona: Black Mountain Press. OCLC 12559708.
- McClintock, James H. (1916). Arizona, Prehistoric, Aboriginal, Pioneer, Modern: The Nation's Youngest Commonwealth Within a Land of Ancient Culture. The S.J. Clarke Publishing Co. OCLC 5398889.
- Wagoner, Jay J. (1970). Arizona Territory 1863–1912: A Political History. University of Arizona Press. ISBN 0816501769.
- Walker, Dale L. (1997). Rough Rider: Buckey O'Neill of Arizona. University of Nebraska Press. ISBN 0-8032-9796-3.
