= J. C. Callaghan =

Arizona Secretary of State, 1929

John C. Callaghan

5th Secretary of State of Arizona
- In office January 7, 1929 – January 27, 1929
- Governor: John Calhoun Phillips (1929 – 1931)
- Preceded by: James H. Kerby
- Succeeded by: Isaac "Ike" Peter Frazier

Personal details
- Born: July 9, 1869 Gallitzin, Pennsylvania, U.S.
- Died: January 27, 1929 (aged 59) Phoenix, Arizona, U.S.
- Party: Democratic

John C. Callaghan (July 9, 1869 – January 27, 1929) was the fourth Arizona Secretary of State. Prior to that he had been elected to be Arizona's first state auditor, taking office on the day Arizona officially became a state on February 14, 1912. He served a second term, but chose not to run for a third term in 1916. In 1926, he ran for and won the position of Arizona State Treasurer. He decided not to run for re-election in 1928, instead running for the Secretary of State office. He easily won the Democratic primary with 17,769 votes, defeating his two opponents: W. H. Linville (13,270 votes) and William C. Joyner (9100 votes). He won a close race in November against Republican Isaac "Ike" Peter Frazier. However, while he was officially the Secretary of State, he never served in his official capacity. He was taken ill on January 5, 1929, and taken to the hospital. He underwent surgery on January 21, and died of complications from that surgery on January 27.
