= Secretary of State of Arizona =

Elected position in the U.S. state of Arizona

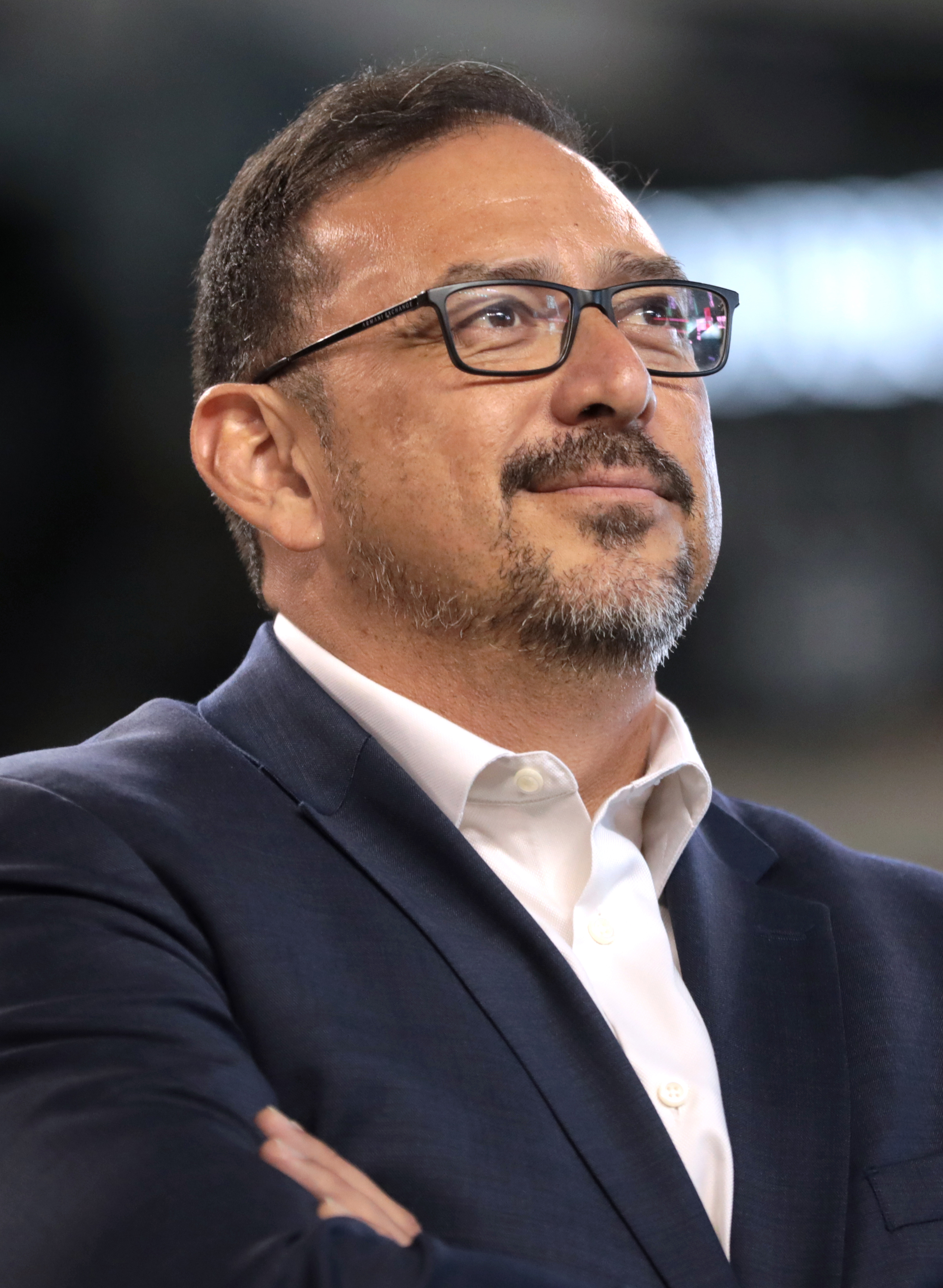
- Incumbent; Adrian Fontes since January 2, 2023
- Style: The Honorable
- Residence: Phoenix, Arizona
- Term length: Four years, can succeed self once; eligible again after 4-year respite
- Formation: 1912
- Succession: First (until Jan. 5, 2027)
- Deputy: Keely Varvel
- Salary: $70,000
- Website: azsos.gov

The secretary of state of Arizona is an elected position in the U.S. state of Arizona. Since Arizona does not have a lieutenant governor, the secretary stands first in the line of succession to the governorship. The secretary also serves as acting governor whenever the governor is incapacitated or out of state. In 2022, voters approved Proposition 131 which created the office of Lieutenant Governor, who will be jointly elected with the Governor, and will supersede the secretary of state in the order of succession. These changes will take effect following the 2026 elections.

The secretary is the keeper of the Seal of Arizona and administers oaths of office. The current office holder is Democrat Adrian Fontes.

== Duties ==
The secretary is in charge of a wide variety of other duties as well. The secretary is in charge of four divisions:

- The secretary is in charge of the Arizona Advance Directive Registry, which is the official state repository of advance directives such as living wills, Medical Powers of Attorney, and Mental Health Powers of Attorney.
- The Business Services Division is responsible for registering trademarks, trade names, and liens under the Uniform Commercial Code. This division also issues apostilles, files intergovernmental agreements and notices of public meetings, and regulates notaries public, employment agencies, sports agents, out-of-state landlords, telemarketers, and charitable organizations. The Business Services Division is responsible for chartering partnerships; corporations, on the other hand, are the responsibility of the Arizona Corporation Commission.
- The Elections Division is responsible for administering all elections in the state, and certifying their results. This division also regulates lobbying and campaign finance.
- The Public Services Division is responsible for filing bills from the Arizona Legislature, registering and publishing administrative regulations, and publishes the Arizona Blue Book, which is an informational guide to the government of Arizona.

The secretary administers the Arizona State Library, Archives and Public Records.

== History ==
The longest-served secretary is Wesley Bolin, who served 12 full terms (including the last two-year term and the first four-year term), and 1 partial term for a total of 28 years, 9 months, 18 days (or 10,518 days). Bolin was also the shortest-serving governor, ascending to the governorship in 1977 after Raúl Héctor Castro resigned, and serving only 5 months before his death.

The second-longest-serving is James H. Kerby who was elected to 6 two-year terms in 1923–1929, and again in 1933–1939. He is also the only one to serve non-consecutively in the office. The shortest tenure goes to J. C. Callaghan who died 20 days after his inauguration.

Only two secretaries of state have been elected governor without having first ascended to the office upon the death, resignation, or impeachment of a sitting governor: Sidney P. Osborn and Katie Hobbs. Osborn was also the first governor to die in office, making Dan Garvey the first secretary of state to ascend to the position. Since then, four other secretaries of state have become governor through filling a vacancy.

== Officeholders ==
Parties

Democratic (15) Republican (7)

#	Image	Secretary	Term start	Term end	Party	Terms
1		Sidney Preston Osborn	February 14, 1912	January 6, 1919	Democratic	3
2		Mit Simms	January 7, 1919	January 3, 1921	Democratic	1
3		Ernest R. Hall	January 3, 1921	January 1, 1923	Republican	1
4		James H. Kerby	January 1, 1923	January 7, 1929	Democratic	3
5		J. C. Callaghan	January 7, 1929	January 27, 1929	Democratic	1/2
6		Isaac "Ike" Peter Fraizer	January 27, 1929	January 5, 1931	Republican	1/2
7		Scott White	January 5, 1931	January 2, 1933	Democratic	1
8		James H. Kerby	January 2, 1933	January 2, 1939	Democratic	3
9		Harry M. Moore	January 2, 1939	November 20, 1942	Democratic	1 1/2
10		Dan Edward Garvey	November 27, 1942	May 25, 1948	Democratic	3 1/2
11		Curtis M. Williams	November 22, 1948	January 3, 1949	Democratic	1/2
12		Wesley Bolin	January 3, 1949	October 20, 1977	Democratic	12 1/2
13		Rose Mofford	October 20, 1977	April 5, 1988	Democratic	3 1/2
14		James Shumway	April 5, 1988	March 6, 1991	Democratic	1/2
15		Richard D. Mahoney	March 6, 1991	January 3, 1995	Democratic	1
16		Jane Dee Hull	January 3, 1995	September 5, 1997	Republican	1/2
17		Betsey Bayless	September 5, 1997	January 6, 2003	Republican	1 1/2
18		Jan Brewer	January 6, 2003	January 21, 2009	Republican	1 1/2
19		Ken Bennett	January 21, 2009	January 5, 2015	Republican	1 1/2
20		Michele Reagan	January 5, 2015	January 7, 2019	Republican	1
21		Katie Hobbs	January 7, 2019	January 2, 2023	Democratic	1
22		Adrian Fontes	January 2, 2023	Incumbent	Democratic	1

== See also ==
- List of company registers
