= 1940 United States elections =

- ← 1938 1939 1940 1941 1942 → Presidential election year
- Election day: November 5
- Incumbent president: ▌Franklin D. Roosevelt (D)
- Next Congress: 77th

Presidential election
- Partisan control: Democratic hold
- Popular vote margin: Democratic +9.9%
- Electoral vote
- Franklin D. Roosevelt (D): 449
- Wendell Willkie (R): 82
- 1940 presidential election results. Red denotes states won by Willkie, blue denotes states won by Roosevelt. Numbers indicate the electoral votes won by each candidate.

Senate elections
- Overall control: Democratic hold
- Seats contested: 36 of 96 seats (32 Class 1 seats + 4 special elections)
- Net seat change: Republican +4
- 1940 Senate results Democratic gain Democratic hold Republican gain Republican hold Progressive hold

House elections
- Overall control: Democratic hold
- Seats contested: All 435 voting members
- Popular vote margin: Democratic +5.8%
- Net seat change: Democratic +5

Gubernatorial elections
- Seats contested: 34
- Net seat change: Republican +2
- 1940 gubernatorial election results Democratic gain Democratic hold Republican gain Republican hold

Elections were held on November 5, 1940. The Democratic Party continued to dominate national politics, as it defended its congressional majorities and retained the presidency. It was the last election prior to the attack on Pearl Harbor and the United States' entry into World War II.

In the presidential election, Democratic incumbent President Franklin D. Roosevelt was elected to serve an unprecedented third term, defeating Republican businessman Wendell Willkie of New York. Although Willkie fared better than the previous two Republican presidential candidates, Roosevelt crushed Willkie in the electoral college and won the popular vote by ten points. At the 1940 Democratic National Convention, Roosevelt overcame opposition from Vice President John Nance Garner and Postmaster General James Farley to win on the first ballot. Willkie won the Republican nomination on the sixth ballot, defeating Ohio Senator Robert A. Taft and Manhattan District Attorney Thomas Dewey.

The Democrats gained five seats in the House of Representatives, furthering their majority over the Republicans. The Democrats also maintained a majority in the U.S. Senate; however, they lost three seats to the Republicans in that house.

== See also ==
- 1940 United States presidential election
- 1940 United States House of Representatives elections
- 1940 United States Senate elections
- 1940 United States gubernatorial elections
