= 1942 Arizona gubernatorial election =

- November 3, 1942
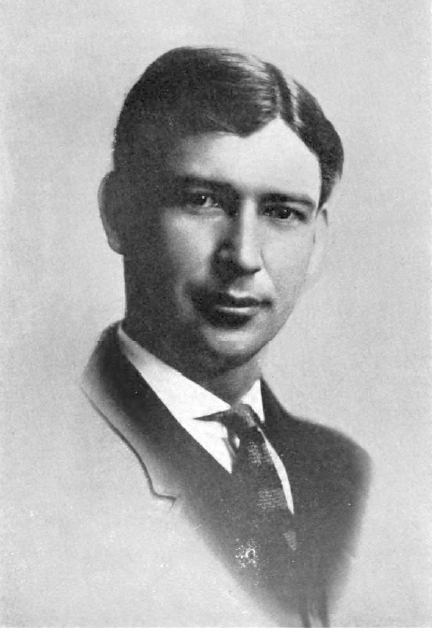

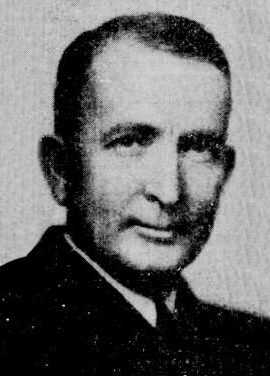
Nominee	Sidney Preston Osborn	Jerrie W. Lee
Party	Democratic	Republican
Popular vote	63,484	23,562
Percentage	72.48%	26.90%
- County results Osborn: 60–70% 70–80% 80–90%
Governor before election
Sidney Preston Osborn
Democratic
Elected Governor
Sidney Preston Osborn
Democratic

The 1942 Arizona gubernatorial election took place on November 3, 1942. Incumbent Governor Sidney Preston Osborn ran for reelection, and easily defeated a challenge from former Governor Robert Taylor Jones in the Democratic primary, who Osborn also defeated in 1940.

In a virtually identical race to 1940, Sidney Preston Osborn defeated Jerrie W. Lee in the general election, and was sworn into his second term as Governor on January 5, 1943.

== Democratic primary ==
The Democratic primary took place on September 8, 1942. Incumbent Governor Sidney Preston Osborn ran for reelection, and defeated former Governor Robert Taylor Jones in the primary. Osborn previously ran against Jones in 1938 and 1940, losing to Jones the first time, and beating him the second time. Daniel C. McKinney, a cattle rancher, also presented a significant challenge to Osborn.

=== Candidates ===
- Sidney Preston Osborn, incumbent Governor
- Robert Taylor Jones, former Governor
- Daniel C. McKinney, cattle rancher
- Ernest Carleton

=== Results ===
Democratic primary results
Party	Candidate	Votes	%
Democratic	Sidney Preston Osborn (incumbent)	46,936	53.10%
Democratic	Robert Taylor Jones	21,604	24.44%
Democratic	Daniel C. McKinney	19,022	21.52%
Democratic	Ernest Carleton	824	0.93%
Total votes		88,386	100.00%

== Republican primary ==
=== Candidates ===
- Jerrie W. Lee, 1938, 1940 Republican gubernatorial nominee

== General election ==
Arizona gubernatorial election, 1942
Party	Candidate	Votes	%	±%
Democratic	Sidney Preston Osborn (incumbent)	63,484	72.48%	+6.96%
Republican	Jerrie W. Lee	23,562	26.90%	−6.90%
Prohibition	Charles R. Osburn	537	0.61%	−0.06%
Majority		39,922	45.58%	
Total votes		87,583	100.00%	
Democratic hold		Swing	+13.86%	

=== Results by county ===
County	Sidney P. Osborn Democratic		Jerrie W. Lee Republican		Charles R. Osburn Prohibition		Margin		Total votes cast
County	#	%	#	%	#	%	#	%	Total votes cast
Apache	1,308	80.15%	320	19.61%	4	0.25%	988	60.54%	1,632
Cochise	5,703	82.41%	1,191	17.21%	26	0.38%	4,512	65.20%	6,920
Coconino	1,468	67.81%	692	31.96%	5	0.23%	776	35.84%	2,165
Gila	4,329	78.61%	1,161	21.08%	17	0.31%	3,168	57.53%	5,507
Graham	2,064	75.88%	642	23.60%	14	0.51%	1,422	52.28%	2,720
Greenlee	1,543	88.47%	187	10.72%	14	0.80%	1,356	77.75%	1,744
Maricopa	22,295	67.49%	10,466	31.68%	272	0.82%	11,829	35.81%	33,033
Mohave	1,151	78.89%	292	20.01%	16	1.10%	859	58.88%	1,459
Navajo	2,316	76.46%	696	22.98%	17	0.56%	1,620	53.48%	3,029
Pima	9,532	71.70%	3,724	28.01%	38	0.29%	5,808	43.69%	13,294
Pinal	2,649	68.95%	1,157	30.11%	36	0.94%	1,492	38.83%	3,842
Santa Cruz	1,223	81.26%	277	18.41%	5	0.33%	946	62.86%	1,505
Yavapai	4,820	71.70%	1,857	27.63%	45	0.67%	2,963	44.08%	6,722
Yuma	3,083	76.86%	900	22.44%	28	0.70%	2,183	54.43%	4,011
Totals	63,484	72.48%	23,562	26.90%	537	0.61%	39,933	45.58%	87,583
