= Jerrie W. Lee =

American rancher and politician (1890–1971)

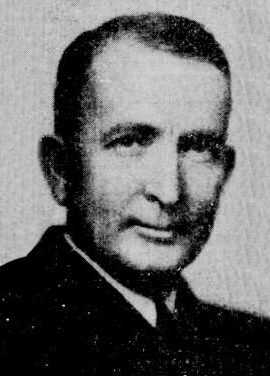
- Born: Jerrie Wellington Lee; 1890; Texas, United States
- Died: 1971 (aged 80–81); Arizona, United States
- Occupations: Rancher, politician
- Known for: Republican candidate for governor
- Political party: Republican
- Spouse: Margaret Lee

Jerrie Wellington Lee (1890–1971) was an American rancher in the state of Arizona who sought the office of Governor of Arizona four times as the Republican nominee, in 1938, 1940, 1942 and 1944. He served as the secretary of the Arizona Wool Growers Association.

== Life and career ==
Jerrie W. Lee was a prominent northern Arizona rancher, who served as the secretary of the Arizona Wool Growers Association. He made four unsuccessful attempts at running for Governor of Arizona, as the Republican Party nominee, first running in 1938 against State Senator Robert Taylor Jones, the Democratic nominee.

In announcing his campaign in 1940, Lee made water usage and the Boulder Dam a prominent part of his campaign. An announcement of his candidacy filed by the Associated Press and published in the Tucson Daily Citizen stated "Whatever I can do, I will do, to bring about for the benefit of the people of Arizona the utilization of the 180,000 horse-power of electrical energy at Boulder Dam which has been allotted and is now available to our state." Lee also stated in his campaign announcement that he would seek to run the office of governor like a business, as well as advocating for an independent audit of the state's various governmental departments in order to eliminate waste and duplicate programs. In addition, Lee indicated that he would "avoid political patronage" in selecting his personnel. Lee lost the race to Sidney Preston Osborn, who was the first secretary of state of Arizona after Arizona gained statehood in 1912.

Lee again ran for governor in 1942 and 1944, losing both times to incumbent governor Sidney Preston Osborn.

Party political offices
| Preceded by Thomas Edward Campbell | Republican nominee for Governor of Arizona; 1938, 1940, 1942, 1944 | Succeeded by Bruce Brockett |
