= 1938 Georgia gubernatorial election =

1938 Georgia Democratic gubernatorial primary
- September 14, 1938

410 county unit votes 206 unit votes needed to win
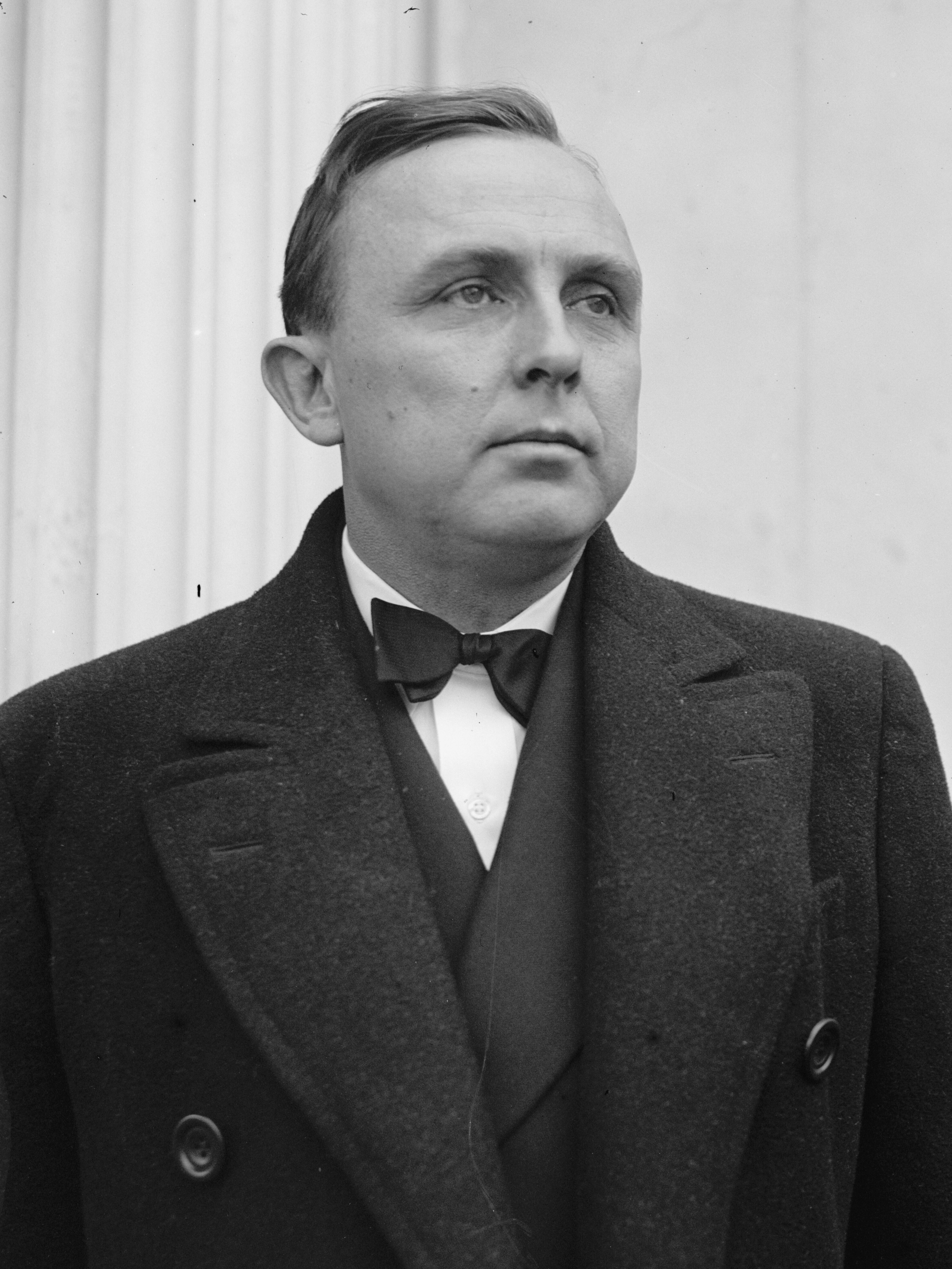

Nominee	Eurith D. Rivers	Hugh Howell	John J. Mangham
Party	Democratic	Democratic	Democratic
Electoral vote	282	126	2
Popular vote	160,459	134,131	19,537
Percentage	50.72%	42.40%	6.18%
- County results Rivers: 30–40% 40–50% 50–60% 60–70% 70–80% 80–90% Howell: 40–50% 50–60% 60–70% Mangham: 50–60%
Governor before election
Eurith D. Rivers
Democratic
Elected Governor
Eurith D. Rivers
Democratic

The 1938 Georgia gubernatorial election took place on November 8, 1938, in order to elect the governor of Georgia.

Incumbent Democratic governor Eurith D. Rivers was re-elected to a second term.

As was common at the time, the Democratic candidate ran with only token opposition in the general election so therefore the Democratic primary was the real contest, and winning the primary was considered tantamount to election.

== Democratic primary ==
The Democratic primary election was held on September 14, 1938. As Rivers won a majority of county unit votes, there was no run-off.

=== County unit system ===
From 1917 until 1962, the Democratic Party in the U.S. state of Georgia used a voting system called the county unit system to determine victors in statewide primary elections.

The system was ostensibly designed to function similarly to the Electoral College, but in practice the large ratio of unit votes for small, rural counties to unit votes for more populous urban areas provided outsized political influence to the smaller counties.

Under the county unit system, the 159 counties in Georgia were divided by population into three categories. The largest eight counties were classified as "Urban", the next-largest 30 counties were classified as "Town", and the remaining 121 counties were classified as "Rural". Urban counties were given 6 unit votes, Town counties were given 4 unit votes, and Rural counties were given 2 unit votes, for a total of 410 available unit votes. Each county's unit votes were awarded on a winner-take-all basis.

Candidates were required to obtain a majority of unit votes (not necessarily a majority of the popular vote), or 206 total unit votes, to win the election. If no candidate received a majority in the initial primary, a runoff election was held between the top two candidates to determine a winner.

=== Candidates ===
- Hugh Howell, former chairman of the Georgia Democratic State Executive Committee
- John J. Mangham, farmer
- Eurith D. Rivers, incumbent governor
- Robert F. Wood, salesman

=== Results ===
Candidate	Popular vote		County unit vote	
Candidate	Votes	%	Votes	%
Eurith D. Rivers	160,459	50.72	282	68.78
Hugh Howell	134,121	42.40	126	30.73
John J. Mangham	19,537	6.18	2	0.49
Robert F. Wood	2,220	0.70		
Total	316,337	100.00	410	100.00

== General election ==
In the general election, Rivers faced token opposition.

=== Results ===
1938 Georgia gubernatorial election
Party	Candidate	Votes	%	±%
Democratic	Eurith D. Rivers (incumbent)	66,863	94.28%	
Independent	E. S. Fuller	1,914	2.70%	
Prohibition	L. P. Glass	1,358	1.92%	
Independent	Alexander Stephens Mitchell	784	1.11%	
Turnout		70,919	100.00%	
Democratic hold		Swing		

== Bibliography ==
- Gubernatorial Elections, 1787-1997. Washington, D.C.: Congressional Quarterly Inc. 1998. ISBN 1-56802-396-0.
- Glashan, Roy R. (1979). American Governors and Gubernatorial Elections, 1775-1978. Meckler Books. ISBN 0-930466-17-9.
- Compiled by Mrs. J.E. Hays, State Historian and Director (1943). Georgia's Official Register, 1939-1941-1943 (PDF). Atlanta, GA: State of Georgia, Department of Archives and History.
