= 1946 Arizona gubernatorial election =

- November 5, 1946
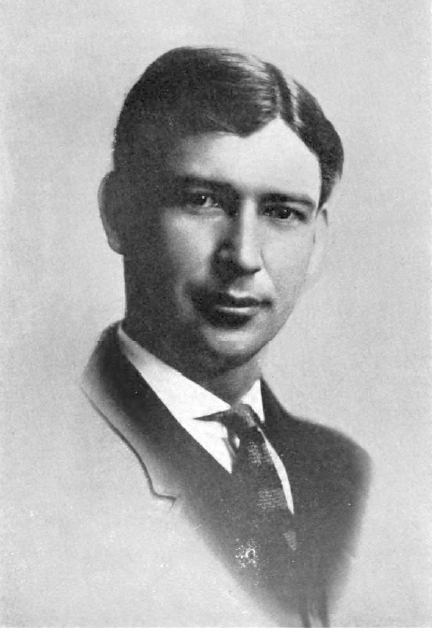

Nominee	Sidney Preston Osborn	Bruce Brockett
Party	Democratic	Republican
Popular vote	73,595	48,867
Percentage	60.10%	39.90%
- County results Osborn: 50–60% 60–70% 70–80%
Governor before election
Sidney Preston Osborn
Democratic
Elected Governor
Sidney Preston Osborn
Democratic

The 1946 Arizona gubernatorial election took place on November 5, 1946. Incumbent Governor Sidney Preston Osborn ran for reelection, easily winning the Democratic primary, as well as defeating Republican challenger Bruce Brockett in the general election, and was sworn into his fourth term as Governor on January 7, 1947. Osborn died in office a year later.

In comparison to previous election cycles, Brockett signaled a shift in voters becoming more Republican, outperforming their past electoral failures significantly.

== Democratic primary ==
=== Candidates ===
- Sidney P. Osborn, former Secretary of State of Arizona
- Howard Sprouse, state legislator

=== Results ===
Democratic primary results
Party	Candidate	Votes	%
Democratic	Sidney Preston Osborn (incumbent)	64,875	81.67%
Democratic	Howard Sprouse	14,565	18.34%
Total votes		79,440	100.00%

== Republican primary ==
=== Candidates ===
- Bruce Brockett, cattleman

== General election ==
Arizona gubernatorial election, 1946
Party	Candidate	Votes	%	±%
Democratic	Sidney Preston Osborn (incumbent)	73,595	60.10%	−17.81%
Republican	Bruce Brockett	48,867	39.90%	+18.71%
Majority		24,728	20.19%	
Total votes		122,462	100.00%	
Democratic hold		Swing	-36.52%	

=== Results by county ===
County	Sidney P. Osborn Democratic		Bruce Brockett Republican		Margin		Total votes cast
County	#	%	#	%	#	%	Total votes cast
Apache	1,183	62.13%	721	37.87%	462	24.26%	1,904
Cochise	5,945	69.78%	2,575	30.22%	3,370	39.55%	8,520
Coconino	1,637	54.93%	1,343	45.07%	294	9.87%	2,980
Gila	3,651	63.47%	2,101	36.53%	1,550	26.95%	5,752
Graham	1,866	58.55%	1,321	41.45%	545	17.10%	3,187
Greenlee	1,594	78.87%	427	21.13%	1,167	57.74%	2,021
Maricopa	30,164	56.52%	23,205	43.48%	6,959	13.04%	53,369
Mohave	1,572	71.91%	614	28.09%	958	43.82%	2,186
Navajo	1,988	59.25%	1,367	40.75%	621	18.51%	3,355
Pima	13,061	61.72%	8,102	38.28%	4,959	23.43%	21,163
Pinal	2,797	61.96%	1,717	38.04%	1,080	23.93%	4,514
Santa Cruz	1,230	68.49%	566	31.51%	664	36.97%	1,796
Yavapai	3,916	55.10%	3,191	44.90%	725	10.20%	7,107
Yuma	2,991	64.91%	1,617	35.09%	1,374	29.82%	4,608
Totals	73,595	60.10%	48,867	39.90%	24,728	20.19%	122,462
