= 1940 Arizona gubernatorial election =

- November 5, 1940
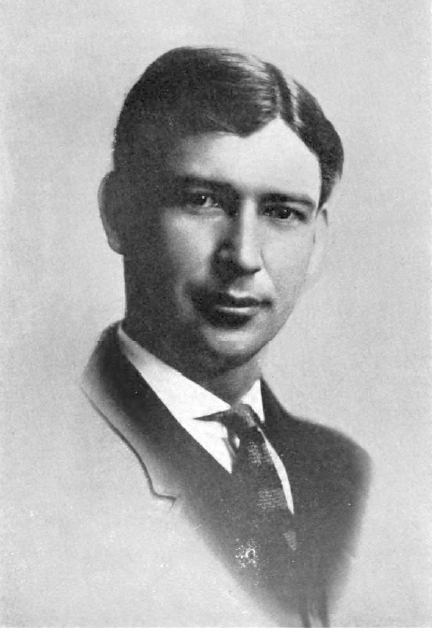

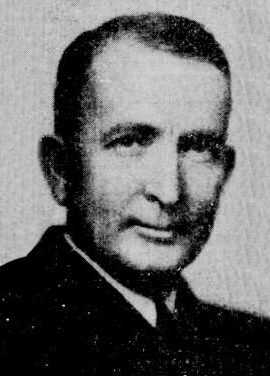
Nominee	Sidney Preston Osborn	Jerrie W. Lee
Party	Democratic	Republican
Popular vote	97,606	50,358
Percentage	65.52%	33.81%
- County results Osborn: 50–60% 60–70% 70–80% 80–90%
Governor before election
Robert Taylor Jones
Democratic
Elected Governor
Sidney Preston Osborn
Democratic

The 1940 Arizona gubernatorial election took place on November 5, 1940. Incumbent Governor Robert Taylor Jones ran for reelection but was defeated in the Democratic primary by former Secretary of State Sidney Preston Osborn, whom Jones had previously defeated in 1938.

Sidney Preston Osborn defeated Jerrie W. Lee in the general election, and was sworn into his first term as Governor on January 6, 1941, becoming Arizona's seventh Governor.

== Democratic primary ==
The Democratic primary took place on September 10, 1940. Incumbent Governor Robert Taylor Jones ran for reelection, but he was defeated by former Secretary of State Sidney Preston Osborn. Osborn previously ran against Jones in 1938, but was defeated due to the race being a three-way with Secretary of State James H. Kerby. C. M. Menderson, Ernest Carleton, George E. Shields, and Howard Sprouse also ran but presented only token opposition.

=== Candidates ===
- Robert Taylor Jones, incumbent Governor
- Sidney Preston Osborn, former Secretary of State of Arizona
- C. M. Menderson
- Ernest Carleton
- George E. Shields
- Howard Sprouse, state legislator

=== Results ===
Democratic primary results
Party	Candidate	Votes	%
Democratic	Sidney Preston Osborn	54,737	46.30%
Democratic	Robert Taylor Jones (incumbent)	49,466	41.84%
Democratic	C. M. Menderson	10,950	9.26%
Democratic	Ernest Carleton	1,834	1.55%
Democratic	George E. Shields	860	0.73%
Democratic	Howard Sprouse	383	0.32%
Total votes		118,230	100.00%

== Republican primary ==
=== Candidates ===
- Jerrie W. Lee, 1938 Republican gubernatorial nominee

== General election ==
Arizona gubernatorial election, 1940
Party	Candidate	Votes	%	±%
Democratic	Sidney Preston Osborn	97,606	65.52%	−3.05%
Republican	Jerrie W. Lee	50,358	33.80%	+6.48%
Prohibition	Charles R. Osburn	1,003	0.67%	+0.67%
Majority		47,248	31.72%	
Turnout		148,967	100.00%	
Democratic hold		Swing	-9.52%	

=== Results by county ===
County	Sidney P. Osborn Democratic		Jerrie W. Lee Republican		Charles R. Osburn Prohibition		Margin		Total votes cast
County	#	%	#	%	#	%	#	%	Total votes cast
Apache	2,180	75.85%	691	24.04%	3	0.10%	1,489	51.81%	2,874
Cochise	9,007	75.97%	2,806	23.67%	43	0.36%	6,201	52.30%	11,856
Coconino	3,264	66.98%	1,591	32.65%	18	0.37%	1,673	34.33%	4,873
Gila	5,885	70.29%	2,453	29.30%	34	0.41%	3,432	40.99%	8,372
Graham	3,076	71.40%	1,200	27.86%	32	0.74%	1,876	43.55%	4,308
Greenlee	2,324	84.39%	419	15.21%	11	0.40%	1,905	69.17%	2,754
Maricopa	33,883	58.64%	23,408	40.51%	488	0.84%	10,475	18.13%	57,779
Mohave	2,292	73.41%	816	26.14%	14	0.45%	1,476	47.28%	3,122
Navajo	3,252	71.61%	1,271	27.99%	18	0.40%	1,981	43.62%	4,541
Pima	15,288	65.43%	7,916	33.88%	163	0.70%	7,372	31.55%	23,367
Pinal	4,525	70.64%	1,861	29.05%	20	0.31%	2,664	41.59%	6,406
Santa Cruz	1,928	75.73%	613	24.08%	5	0.20%	1,315	51.65%	2,546
Yavapai	6,288	62.02%	3,731	36.80%	120	1.18%	2,557	25.22%	10,139
Yuma	4,414	73.20%	1,582	26.24%	34	0.56%	2,832	46.97%	6,030
Totals	97,606	65.52%	50,358	33.80%	1,003	0.67%	47,248	31.72%	148,967
