= 1938 Arizona gubernatorial election =

- November 8, 1938
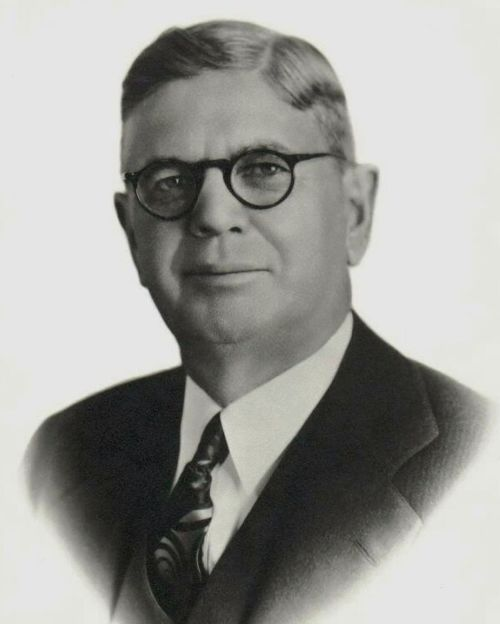

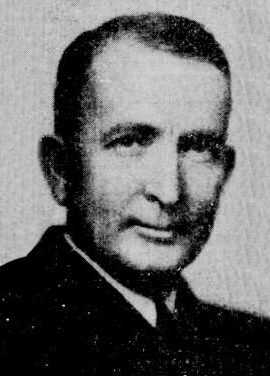
Nominee	Robert Taylor Jones	Jerrie W. Lee
Party	Democratic	Republican
Popular vote	80,350	32,022
Percentage	68.57%	27.33%
- County results Jones: 60–70% 70–80% 80–90%
Governor before election
Rawghlie Clement Stanford
Democratic
Elected Governor
Robert Taylor Jones
Democratic

The 1938 Arizona gubernatorial election took place on November 8, 1938. Incumbent Governor Rawghlie Clement Stanford declined to run for reelection, with pharmacy and cattle ranch owner Robert Taylor Jones winning the Democratic nomination to succeed Stanford.

Robert Taylor Jones defeated Jerrie W. Lee in the general election, and was sworn into his first and only term as Governor on January 2, 1939, becoming Arizona's sixth Governor.

== Democratic primary ==
The Democratic primary took place on September 13, 1938. Incumbent Governor Rawghlie Clement Stanford, who had served only one term, declined to run for reelection amidst the Great Depression. Pharmacy and cattle ranch owner Robert Taylor Jones, Secretary of State James H. Kerby, former Secretary of State Sidney P. Osborn, Mayor Andrew Jackson Bettwy, and C. M. Zander ran to replace Stanford.

After losing the Democratic primary, James Kerby ran as an Independent Democrat in the general election, but received only token support, in the single digits.

=== Candidates ===
- Robert Taylor Jones, pharmacy owner, cattle rancher
- James H. Kerby, Secretary of State of Arizona
- Sidney P. Osborn, former Secretary of State of Arizona
- Andrew Jackson Bettwy, former Mayor of Nogales, Arizona
- C. M. Zander, Secretary of the Board of Directors of State Institutions

=== Results ===
Democratic primary results
Party	Candidate	Votes	%
Democratic	Robert Taylor Jones	38,543	34.20%
Democratic	James H. Kerby	35,867	31.83%
Democratic	Sidney P. Osborn	34,307	30.44%
Democratic	Andrew Jackson Bettwy	3,584	3.18%
Democratic	C. M. Zander	389	0.35%
Total votes		112,690	100.00%

== Republican primary ==
=== Candidates ===
- Jerrie W. Lee, secretary of the Arizona Wool Growers Association

== General election ==
Arizona gubernatorial election, 1938
Party	Candidate	Votes	%	±%
Democratic	Robert Taylor Jones	80,350	68.57%	−2.11%
Republican	Jerrie W. Lee	32,022	27.33%	−1.79%
Independent Democrat	James H. Kerby	4,814	4.11%	+4.11%
Majority		48,328	41.24%	
Total votes		117,184	100.00%	
Democratic hold		Swing	-0.33%	

=== Results by county ===
County	Robert Taylor Jones Democratic		Jerrie W. Lee Republican		James H. Kerby Independent Democratic		Margin		Total votes cast
County	#	%	#	%	#	%	#	%	Total votes cast
Apache	2,144	81.96%	405	15.48%	67	2.56%	1,739	66.48%	2,616
Cochise	7,457	75.23%	1,954	19.71%	501	5.05%	5,503	55.52%	9,912
Coconino	2,851	72.97%	952	24.37%	104	2.66%	1,899	48.61%	3,907
Gila	4,912	70.41%	1,722	24.68%	342	4.90%	3,190	45.73%	6,976
Graham	3,212	76.39%	827	19.67%	166	3.95%	2,385	56.72%	4,205
Greenlee	1,743	84.37%	176	8.52%	147	7.12%	1,567	75.85%	2,066
Maricopa	27,007	60.76%	15,296	34.41%	2,144	4.82%	11,711	26.35%	44,447
Mohave	1,776	78.13%	389	17.11%	108	4.75%	1,387	61.02%	2,273
Navajo	2,986	73.82%	932	23.04%	127	3.14%	2,054	50.78%	4,045
Pima	11,557	71.03%	4,354	26.76%	360	2.21%	7,203	44.27%	16,271
Pinal	3,549	71.60%	1,272	25.66%	136	2.74%	2,277	45.94%	4,957
Santa Cruz	1,687	73.99%	555	24.34%	38	1.67%	1,132	49.65%	2,280
Yavapai	5,845	66.77%	2,563	29.28%	346	3.95%	3,282	37.49%	8,754
Yuma	3,624	80.95%	625	13.96%	228	5.09%	2,999	66.99%	4,477
Totals	80,350	68.57%	32,022	27.33%	4,814	4.11%	48,328	41.24%	117,186
