= 1944 Arizona gubernatorial election =

- November 7, 1944
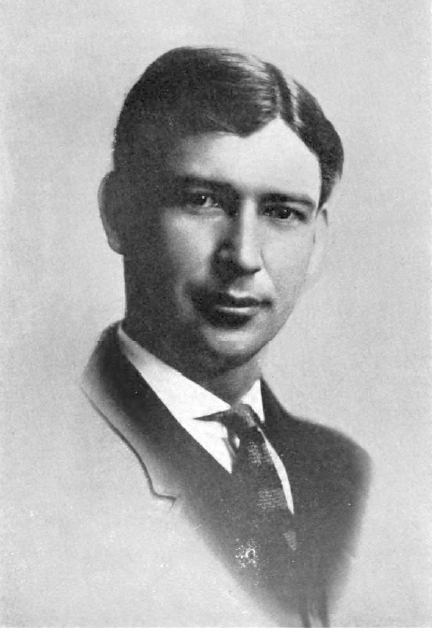

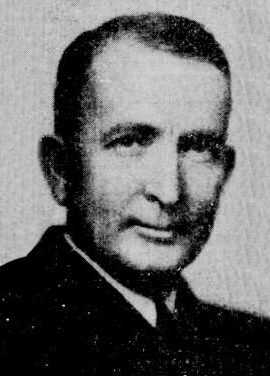
| Nominee | Sidney Preston Osborn | Jerrie W. Lee |
| Party | Democratic | Republican |
| Popular vote | 100,220 | 27,261 |
| Percentage | 77.91% | 21.19% |
- County results Osborn: 70–80% 80–90% >90%
Governor before election
Sidney Preston Osborn
Democratic
Elected Governor
Sidney Preston Osborn
Democratic

The 1944 Arizona gubernatorial election took place on November 7, 1944. Incumbent Governor Sidney Preston Osborn ran for reelection, and easily won the Democratic primary, with only token opposition as former Governor Robert Taylor Jones declined to challenge Osborn to a rematch following two losses, in 1940 and 1942.

In a virtually identical race to 1940 and 1942, Sidney Preston Osborn defeated Jerrie W. Lee in the general election, and was sworn into his third term as Governor on January 2, 1945.

== Democratic primary ==
The Democratic primary took place on July 18, 1944. Incumbent Governor Sidney Preston Osborn ran for reelection, and defeated State Senator William Coxon easily, with former Governor Robert Taylor Jones declining to challenge Osborn after losing to him twice in the past two election cycles in 1940 and 1942.

=== Candidates ===
- Sidney Preston Osborn, incumbent Governor
- William Coxon, State Senator

=== Results ===
Democratic primary results
| Party | Candidate | Votes | % |
|---|---|---|---|
| Democratic | Sidney Preston Osborn (incumbent) | 59,254 | 75.28% |
| Democratic | William Coxon | 19,454 | 24.72% |
| Total votes | | 78,708 | 100.00% |

== Republican primary ==
=== Candidates ===
- Jerrie W. Lee, 1938, 1940, 1942 Republican gubernatorial nominee
- Harry F. Michael

=== Results ===
Republican primary results
| Party | Candidate | Votes | % |
|---|---|---|---|
| Republican | Jerrie W. Lee | 5,237 | 71.32% |
| Republican | Harry F. Michael | 2,106 | 28.68% |
| Total votes | | 7,343 | 100.00% |

== General election ==
Arizona gubernatorial election, 1944
| Party | Candidate | Votes | % | ±% |
|---|---|---|---|---|
| Democratic | Sidney Preston Osborn (incumbent) | 100,220 | 77.91% | +5.42% |
| Republican | Jerrie W. Lee | 27,261 | 21.19% | −5.71% |
| Prohibition | Charles R. Osburn | 1,161 | 0.90% | +0.29% |
| Majority | | 72,959 | 56.71% | |
| Total votes | | 128,642 | 100.00% | |
| Democratic hold | | Swing | +11.13% | |

=== Results by county ===
| County | Sidney P. Osborn Democratic | | Jerrie W. Lee Republican | | Charles R. Osburn Prohibition | | Margin | | Total votes cast |
| County | # | % | # | % | # | % | # | % | Total votes cast |
|---|---|---|---|---|---|---|---|---|---|
| Apache | 1,505 | 78.88% | 395 | 20.70% | 8 | 0.42% | 1,110 | 58.18% | 1,908 |
| Cochise | 8,344 | 83.18% | 1,657 | 16.52% | 30 | 0.30% | 6,687 | 66.66% | 10,031 |
| Coconino | 2,851 | 74.09% | 967 | 25.13% | 30 | 0.78% | 1,884 | 48.96% | 3,848 |
| Gila | 5,555 | 80.05% | 1,315 | 18.95% | 69 | 0.99% | 4,240 | 61.10% | 6,939 |
| Graham | 2,752 | 82.03% | 564 | 16.81% | 39 | 1.16% | 2,188 | 65.22% | 3,355 |
| Greenlee | 2,229 | 85.08% | 369 | 14.08% | 22 | 0.84% | 1,860 | 70.99% | 2,620 |
| Maricopa | 39,406 | 70.45% | 16,163 | 28.90% | 362 | 0.65% | 23,243 | 41.56% | 55,931 |
| Mohave | 1,669 | 76.24% | 505 | 23.07% | 15 | 0.69% | 1,164 | 53.17% | 2,189 |
| Navajo | 3,390 | 80.91% | 784 | 18.71% | 16 | 0.38% | 2,606 | 62.20% | 4,190 |
| Pima | 17,245 | 96.15% | 314 | 1.75% | 377 | 2.10% | 16,868 (Note: Margin over Osburn) | 94.05% | 17,936 |
| Pinal | 3,650 | 75.13% | 1,172 | 24.13% | 36 | 0.74% | 2,478 | 51.01% | 4,858 |
| Santa Cruz | 1,623 | 82.34% | 344 | 17.45% | 4 | 0.20% | 1,279 | 64.89% | 1,971 |
| Yavapai | 5,820 | 75.14% | 1,819 | 23.48% | 107 | 1.38% | 4,001 | 51.65% | 7,746 |
| Yuma | 4,181 | 81.66% | 893 | 17.44% | 46 | 0.90% | 3,288 | 64.22% | 5,120 |
| Totals | 100,220 | 77.91% | 27,261 | 21.19% | 1,161 | 0.90% | 72,959 | 56.71% | 128,642 |
