= 1940 North Carolina gubernatorial election =

- November 5, 1940
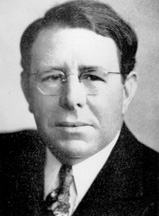

Nominee	J. Melville Broughton	Robert H. McNeill
Party	Democratic	Republican
Popular vote	608,744	195,402
Percentage	75.70%	24.30%
- County results Broughton: 50–60% 60–70% 70–80% 80–90% >90% McNeill: 50–60% 60–70% 70–80%
Governor before election
Clyde R. Hoey
Democratic
Elected Governor
J. Melville Broughton
Democratic

The 1940 North Carolina gubernatorial election was held on November 5, 1940. Democratic nominee J. Melville Broughton defeated Republican nominee Robert H. McNeill with 75.70% of the vote.

== Primary elections ==
Primary elections were held on May 25, 1940.

=== Democratic primary ===
==== Candidates ====
- J. Melville Broughton, former State Senator
- Wilkins P. Horton, incumbent Lieutenant Governor
- Allen J. Maxwell
- Lee Gravely
- Thomas E. Cooper
- Paul D. Grady, former State Senator
- Arthur Simmons

==== Results ====
Democratic primary results
Party	Candidate	Votes	%
Democratic	J. Melville Broughton	147,386	31.40
Democratic	Wilkins P. Horton	105,916	22.56
Democratic	Allen J. Maxwell	102,095	21.75
Democratic	Lee Gravely	63,030	13.43
Democratic	Thomas E. Cooper	33,176	7.07
Democratic	Paul D. Grady	15,735	3.35
Democratic	Arthur Simmons	2,058	0.44
Total votes		469,396	100.00

=== Republican primary ===
==== Candidates ====
- Robert Hayes McNeill, attorney
- George M. Pritchard, former U.S. Representative
- John R. Hoffman

==== Results ====
Republican primary results
Party	Candidate	Votes	%
Republican	Robert H. McNeill	13,130	47.32
Republican	George M. Pritchard	11,847	42.69
Republican	John R. Hoffman	2,773	9.99
Total votes		27,750	100.00

== General election ==
=== Candidates ===
- J. Melville Broughton, Democratic
- Robert H. McNeill, Republican

=== Results ===
1940 North Carolina gubernatorial election
Party	Candidate	Votes	%	±%
Democratic	J. Melville Broughton	608,744	75.70%	
Republican	Robert H. McNeill	195,402	24.30%	
Majority		413,342		
Turnout		804,146		
Democratic hold		Swing		
