= Sidney Preston Osborn =

American politician (1884–1948)

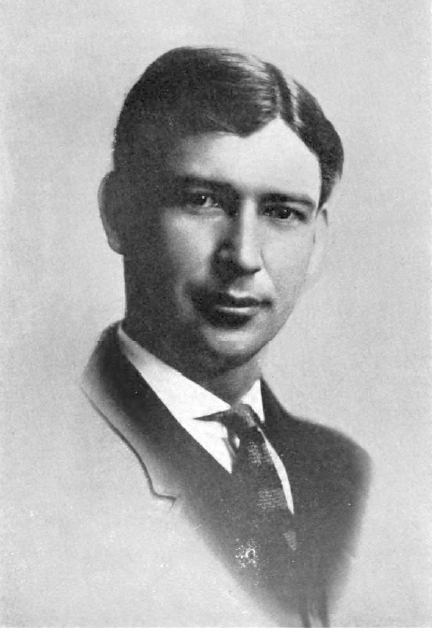

7th Governor of Arizona
- In office January 6, 1941 – May 25, 1948
- Preceded by: Robert Taylor Jones
- Succeeded by: Dan Edward Garvey

1st Secretary of State of Arizona
- In office February 14, 1912 – January 6, 1919
- Governor: George W. P. Hunt; Thomas Edward Campbell
- Preceded by: Inaugural Holder
- Succeeded by: Mit Simms

Personal details
- Born: May 17, 1884 Phoenix, Arizona Territory
- Died: May 25, 1948 (aged 64) Phoenix, Arizona, U.S.
- Party: Democratic
- Spouse(s): Marjorie Grant Osborn (her death); Gladys Smiley Osborn (his death)

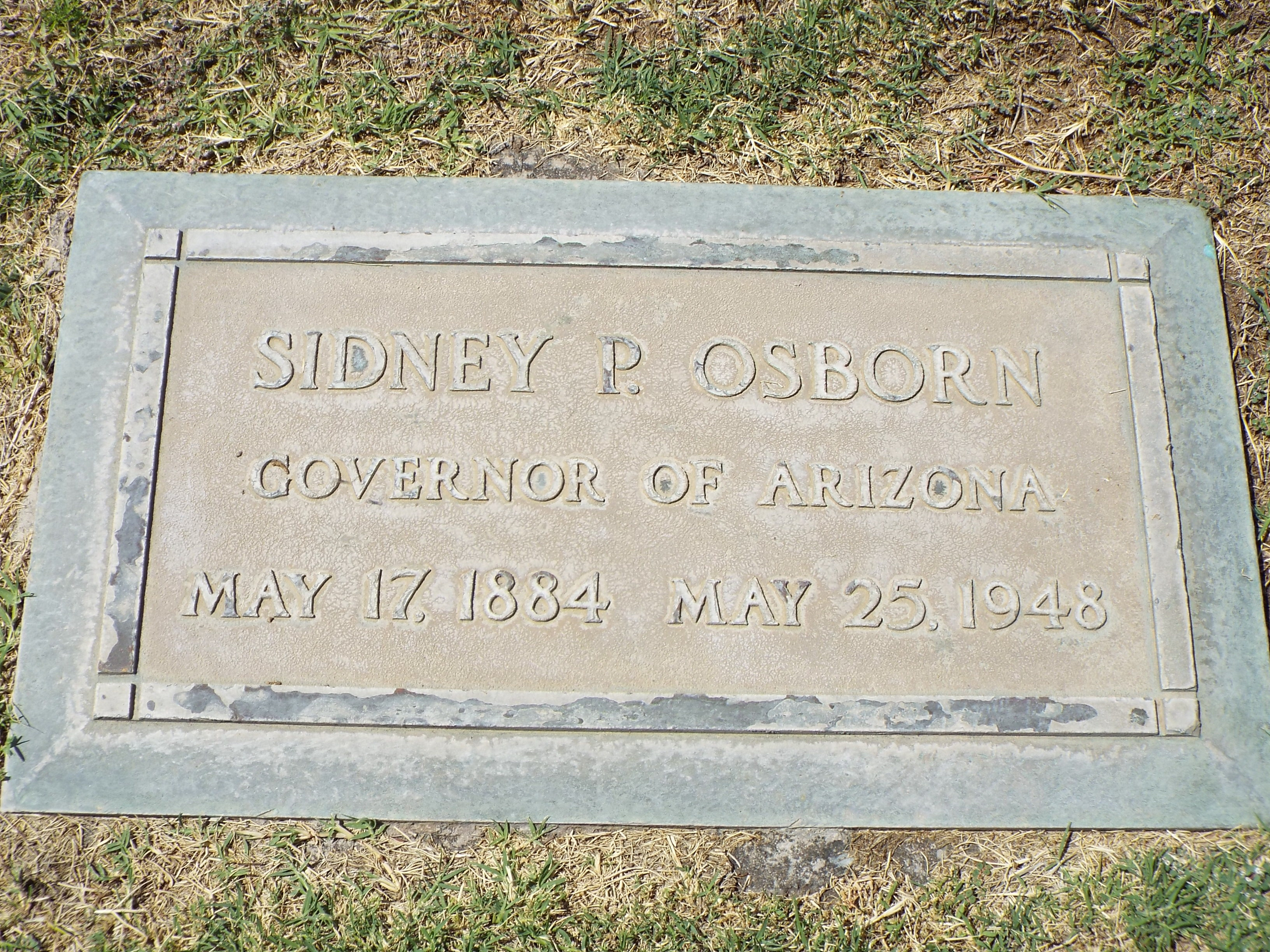
Sidney Preston Osborn

Sidney Preston Osborn (May 17, 1884 – May 25, 1948) was an American politician who was the first secretary of state of Arizona, and later the seventh governor of Arizona and is, as of 2026, the only governor of Arizona to be elected to four consecutive terms (Governors of Arizona served 2-year terms without limits until 1968, when it was changed to serve 4-year terms, and again in 1992 to a limit of two terms at a time). Osborn is also the second native-born governor of Arizona, preceded by Thomas Edward Campbell.

== Early years and political rise ==
Born May 17, 1884 in Phoenix, Arizona, Osborn worked as a page for the Arizona Territorial Legislature in 1898, and later a secretary to the Congressional Delegate John Frank Wilson (1903–1905). For a time Osborn worked as a newspaper reporter and editor; later he served as a delegate to the Arizona state constitutional convention of 1910.

== Career in the state of Arizona ==
Despite being elected three times as secretary of state by wide margins in the 1910s, Osborn had little political success for the next two decades. He lost two primaries for governor in 1924 and 1938, and a Senate primary against Henry F. Ashurst in 1934. Despite a narrow primary win in 1940, his elections as a gubernatorial nominee never went below 60% of the vote.

His governing style was no-nonsense. The best example occurred at the very beginning of his governorship: Upon taking office, Osborn had the state's top officials turn in a signed, but undated, resignation letter. If an official became an embarrassment to the state, Osborn would date the letter, and announce the official had resigned.

During his fourth term, Osborn suffered from Lou Gehrig's Disease and was hardly able to communicate with his staff. He eventually died in office in 1948 and was succeeded by Dan Garvey. Osborn was buried in Phoenix's Greenwood/Memory Lawn Mortuary & Cemetery.

A pro-labor Democrat, Osborn presided over a number of progressive reforms in areas such as workman’s compensation and social welfare during his time as governor.

Despite numerous conceptions, Osborn Road in Phoenix was not named after Osborn. It was first named as such in 1900, after Governor Osborn's grandfather John Preston Osborn, when Governor Osborn was 16. John Preston and the Governor's father Neri Osborn both served in the territorial legislature.

== Bibliography ==
- Capace, Nancy (1999). "Governors". Encyclopedia of Arizona. Somerset Pubs. p. 121.

Party political offices
Preceded by Robert Taylor Jones	Democratic nominee for Governor of Arizona; 1940, 1942, 1944, 1946	Succeeded by Dan Edward Garvey
Political offices
Preceded by new office	Secretary of State of Arizona; 1912 – 1919	Succeeded by Mit Simms
Preceded by Robert T. Jones	Governor of Arizona; 1941 – 1948	Succeeded by Dan E. Garvey
