= James H. Kerby =

American politician (1881–1957)

James Haden Kerby

4th & 8th Secretary of State of Arizona
- In office January 2, 1933 – January 2, 1939
- Governor: Benjamin Moeur (1933–1937); Rawghlie Stanford (1937–1939)
- Preceded by: Scott White
- Succeeded by: Harry M. Moore
- In office January 1, 1923 – January 7, 1929
- Governor: George W. P. Hunt
- Preceded by: Ernest R. Hall
- Succeeded by: John C. Callaghan

Personal details
- Born: April 30, 1881 Huntsville, Missouri, U.S.
- Died: September 11, 1957 (aged 76) Phoenix, Arizona, U.S.
- Party: Democratic

James Haden Kerby (April 30, 1881 – September 11, 1957) was an early Arizona politician, elected 6 different times to the office of Secretary of State in the 1920s and 1930s. Kerby served the second longest tenure of that office, his 12 years being only beaten by Wesley Bolin's 28 years, 9 months, and 18 days.

Kerby left the office twice, in 1928 and 1938, to run for the Democratic nomination for governor, he failed in both attempts. Kerby also ran unsuccessfully as an Independent candidate for governor in 1938 after a narrow loss in the three-way primary, garnering less than 5% of the vote. He ran in the Democratic primary for the 1st congressional district in 1942 and in the Democratic primary for a seventh term as secretary of state in 1944, but failed in both endeavors.

He died in Phoenix, Arizona at the age of 76.

Political offices
Preceded by Ernest R. Hall	Secretary of State of Arizona; 1923 – 1929	Succeeded by John C. Callaghan
Preceded by Scott White	Secretary of State of Arizona; 1933 – 1939	Succeeded by Harry M. Moore
