= Robert Taylor Jones =

American politician (1884–1958)

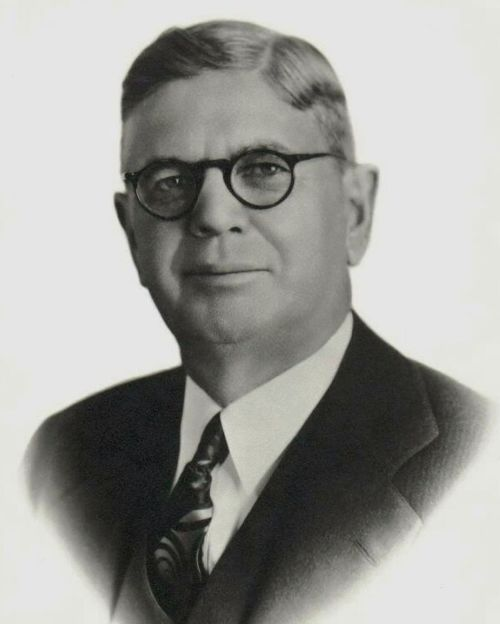

6th Governor of Arizona
- In office January 2, 1939 – January 6, 1941
- Preceded by: Rawghlie C. Stanford
- Succeeded by: Sidney P. Osborn

Member of the Arizona Senate from the Maricopa County district
- In office January 1937 – December 1938
- Preceded by: Joe C. Haldiman; George A. Johnson
- Succeeded by: James Minotto; Charles M. Menderson

Member of the Arizona Senate from the Pinal County district
- In office January 1931 – December 1934
- Preceded by: George E. Truman
- Succeeded by: Peter H. Ethington

Personal details
- Born: February 8, 1884 Rutledge, Tennessee, U.S.
- Died: June 11, 1958 (aged 74) Phoenix, Arizona, U.S.
- Party: Democratic

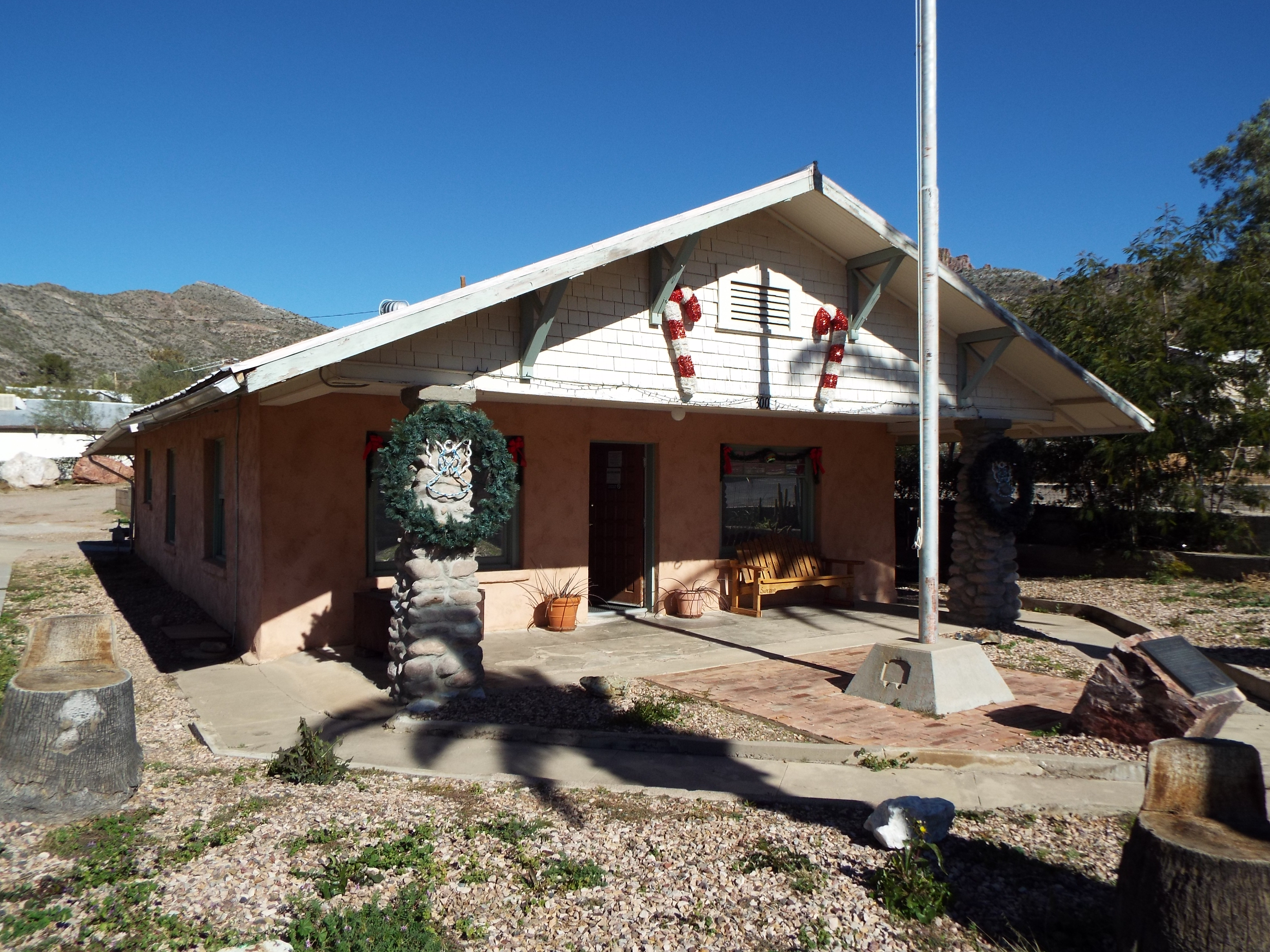
Jones' house in Superior, Arizona

Robert Taylor Jones (February 8, 1884 – June 11, 1958) was an American businessman and politician who served as the sixth governor of the U.S. state of Arizona and served from 1939 to 1941.

== Early years ==
He was born in Rutledge, Tennessee, to Samuel Joseph and Sara Elizabeth (Legg) Jones. His father was an American Civil War veteran from the Union side who was active in politics and in the affairs of his community.

Jones was educated in the Tennessee public schools, He began his career as a self-taught practical engineer, while still in his teens. He was involved in the building of a railroad through eastern Tennessee. The experience which he obtained was to his benefit when he went into business for himself as a small contractor. He participated in the construction of the Panama Canal for one year as a civil engineer.

== Businessman ==
When Jones returned to the United States, he went to live in Los Angeles. Later he became involved in the construction of a railroad from Las Vegas to Salt Lake City.

In 1909, he came to the territory of Arizona and worked with the Globe and Gila Valley railroad. That year Jones met Elon Armstrong of Winkelman, Arizona, daughter of W. T. Armstrong, a pioneer Arizona cattleman and a one-time sheriff of Gila County. They were married in 1911 and purchased a house at 300 Main Street, in the town of Superior where they settled down. The couple had two children: Kathryn and Albert Claude.

Also in 1911, he founded the “Jones Drug Company”, a pharmacy which eventually became a chain of pharmacies with branches in Phoenix, Florence, Mesa, and Tucson.

== Political career ==
On January 2, 1939, Jones became the 6th Governor of Arizona. He served as governor for one year until January 6, 1941, as a member of the Democratic Party. Prior to his becoming governor, Jones served as a State Senator from Maricopa County in the 13th Arizona State Legislature during 1937–1938. He also served two terms in the State Senate as the lone senator from Pinal County in the 10th and 11th Arizona State Legislatures.

== Later years ==
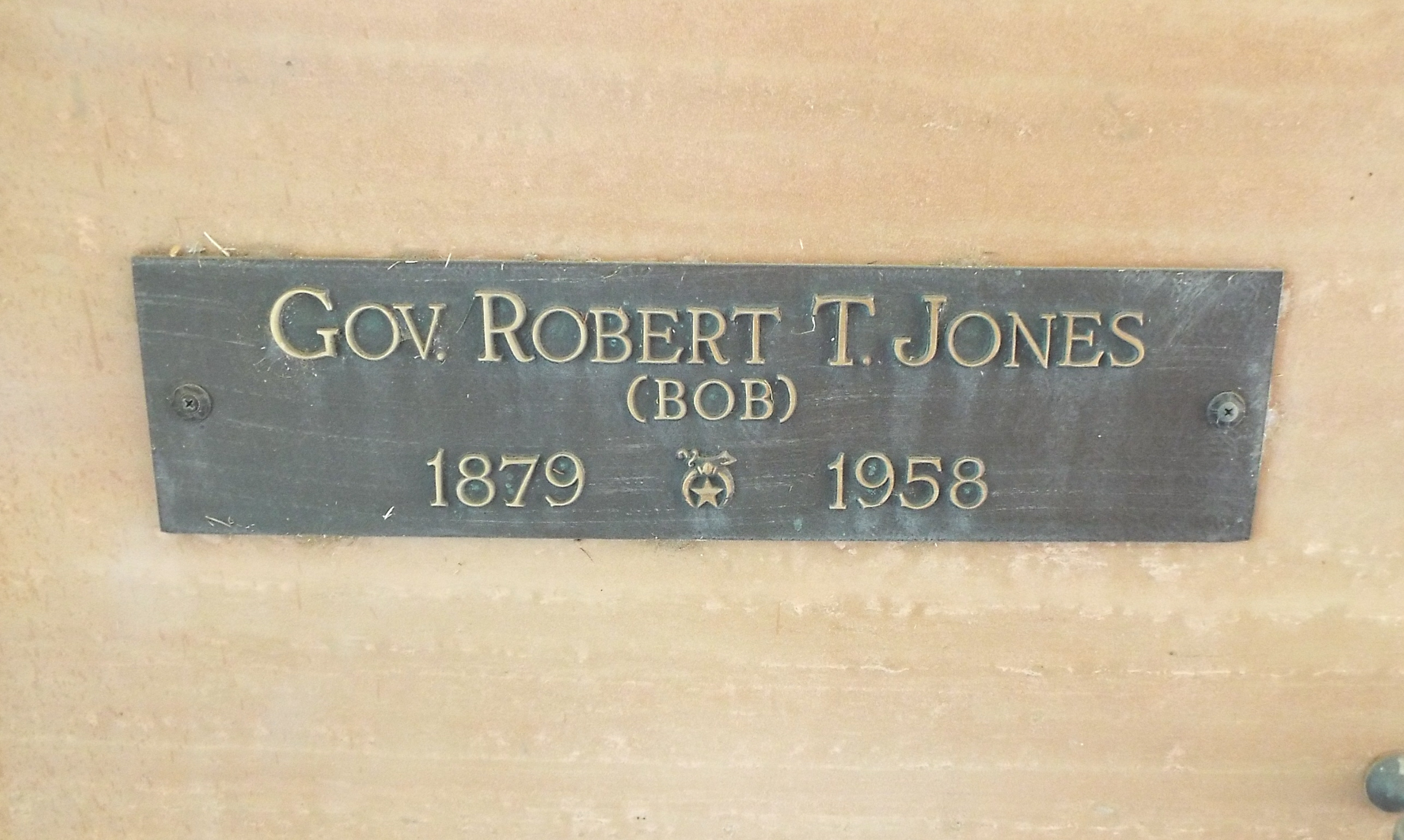
Crypt of Jones in Phoenix, Arizona

Jones returned to his drug store business, however in 1953, he left the drug store business and started the Jones Western Wear store in Phoenix at 101 E. Washington, where his Phoenix pharmacy used to be. He also owned a cattle ranch near Chandler.

He died on June 11, 1958, in Phoenix, Arizona and is buried in Greenwood/Memory Lawn Mortuary & Cemetery in Phoenix.

His house in Superior was converted into the Bob Jones Museum in March 1994. The displays in the museum are focused on local artifacts and include exhibits of photographs, mining equipment and geological samples.

Party political offices
Preceded by Rawghlie Clement Stanford	Democratic nominee for Governor of Arizona; 1938	Succeeded by Sidney Preston Osborn
Political offices
Preceded by Rawghlie C. Stanford	Governor of Arizona; 1939–1941	Succeeded by Sidney Preston Osborn
