= 1964 United States presidential election in Arizona =

- November 3, 1964

Nominee	Barry Goldwater	Lyndon B. Johnson
Party	Republican	Democratic
Home state	Arizona	Texas
Running mate	William E. Miller	Hubert Humphrey
Electoral vote	5	0
Popular vote	242,535	237,753
Percentage	50.45%	49.45%

Goldwater
50–60%
Johnson
50–60%
60–70%
70–80%
President before election
Lyndon B. Johnson
Democratic
President-elect
Lyndon B. Johnson
Democratic

The 1964 United States presidential election in Arizona took place on November 3, 1964, as part of the 1964 United States presidential election, which was held throughout all 50 states and D.C. Voters chose five representatives, or electors to the Electoral College, who voted for president and vice president.

Amidst a national landslide for incumbent Democratic President Lyndon B. Johnson, Arizona was one of only six states carried by Republican native son and U.S. Senator Barry Goldwater, the only such state outside of the Deep South, and the only state to be won by the Republican nominee in both 1960 and 1964. Goldwater carried his home state by a slim margin of 0.99%, or less than 5,000 votes, the smallest margin of any state. Arizona weighed in this election as 23 points more Republican than the nation at large.

Key to Goldwater's victory was Maricopa County, the state's most populous county, which he carried by over 21,000 votes, despite Johnson carrying 10 out of 14 counties and two out of three congressional districts. As of 2024, this is the last time that Graham, Mohave, and Yuma Counties have supported a Democratic presidential candidate. This marked the first time that Mohave County voted for the statewide losing candidate.

Since gaining statehood in 1912, Arizona had been considered a bellwether state in elections. The preceding 1960 presidential election was the first ever in which Arizona did not back the national winner. This election, however, solidified Arizona's transition from swing state to a Republican stronghold. From 1952 to 1992, Arizona would vote for the Republican candidate in every presidential election (in most cases by a much larger margin than Goldwater's), giving it the longest Republican voting streak in the nation. Democrats Bill Clinton in 1996 and Joe Biden in 2020 would go on to narrowly carry the state with pluralities, but Arizona continues to lean Republican relative to the nation. The last Democrat to win a majority of the state's vote was Harry S. Truman in 1948, thus making Arizona the only state in which no Democrat has won a majority of the vote in or after the latter half of the 20th century.

== Results ==
1964 United States presidential election in Arizona
Party	Candidate	Votes	%
Republican	Barry Goldwater	242,535	50.45%
Democratic	Lyndon B. Johnson (incumbent)	237,753	49.45%
Socialist Labor	Eric Hass	482	0.10%
Majority		4,782	0.99%
Total votes		480,770	100.00%

=== Results by county ===
County	Barry Goldwater Republican		Lyndon B. Johnson Democratic		Eric Hass Socialist Labor		Margin		Total votes cast
County	#	%	#	%	#	%	#	%	Total votes cast
Apache	1,849	47.51%	2,042	52.47%	1	0.02%	-193	-4.96%	3,892
Cochise	7,644	45.78%	9,045	54.17%	8	0.05%	-1,401	-8.39%	16,697
Coconino	5,756	52.15%	5,270	47.75%	11	0.10%	486	4.40%	11,037
Gila	3,713	35.24%	6,821	64.73%	3	0.03%	-3,108	-29.49%	10,537
Graham	2,655	48.82%	2,783	51.18%	0	0.00%	-128	-2.36%	5,438
Greenlee	1,132	26.45%	3,147	73.55%	0	0.00%	-2,015	-47.10%	4,279
Maricopa	143,114	53.94%	122,042	46.00%	170	0.06%	21,072	7.94%	265,326
Mohave	2,091	48.19%	2,243	51.69%	5	0.12%	-152	-3.50%	4,339
Navajo	4,870	50.47%	4,770	49.44%	9	0.09%	100	1.03%	9,649
Pima	46,955	46.36%	54,120	53.44%	203	0.20%	-7,165	-7.08%	101,278
Pinal	6,956	41.23%	9,911	58.74%	5	0.03%	-2,955	-17.51%	16,872
Santa Cruz	1,503	43.44%	1,955	56.50%	2	0.06%	-452	-13.06%	3,460
Yavapai	7,749	57.16%	5,747	42.39%	60	0.45%	2,002	14.77%	13,556
Yuma	6,548	45.44%	7,857	54.52%	5	0.04%	-1,309	-9.08%	14,410
Totals	242,535	50.45%	237,753	49.45%	482	0.10%	4,782	1.00%	480,770

==== Counties that flipped from Republican to Democratic ====
- Apache
- Cochise
- Graham
- Mohave
- Pima

== Electors ==
Electors were chosen by their party's voters in primary elections held on September 8, 1964.

Lyndon B. Johnson & Hubert Humphrey Democratic Party	Barry Goldwater & William E. Miller Republican Party	Eric Hass & Henning A. Blomen Socialist Labor Party
Eunice Collins; Thomas J. Croaff Jr.; Edyth Dailey; Dan Garvey; Joe Huerta	J. W. Allen; Kenneth G. Bentson; Mrs. Marc Claridge; Mrs. Scott Libby; John G. Speiden	Justine Blackwell; Lawrence G. Blackwell; Wrignol Everett Quillen; Elizabeth Horvath; Nickolas Mays
