= 2012 United States presidential election in Arizona =

- November 6, 2012
- Turnout: 74.36% ▼

Nominee	Mitt Romney	Barack Obama
Party	Republican	Democratic
Home state	Massachusetts	Illinois
Running mate	Paul Ryan	Joe Biden
Electoral vote	11	0
Popular vote	1,233,654	1,025,232
Percentage	53.65%	44.59%

Romney
40–50%
50–60%
60–70%
70–80%
80–90%
90–100%
Obama
40–50%
50–60%
60–70%
70–80%
80–90%
90–100%
Tie/No Data
President before election
Barack Obama
Democratic
Elected President
Barack Obama
Democratic

The 2012 United States presidential election in Arizona took place on November 6, 2012, as part of the 2012 United States presidential election in which all 50 states plus the District of Columbia participated. State voters chose 11 electors to represent them in the Electoral College via a popular vote pitting incumbent Democratic President Barack Obama and his running mate, Vice President Joe Biden, against Republican challenger and former Massachusetts Governor Mitt Romney and his running mate, Congressman Paul Ryan. Prior to the election, all 17 news organizations considered this a state Romney would win, or otherwise considered as a safe red state. Arizona was won by Romney with a 9.06% margin. Obama is the only Democrat to ever win two terms without carrying the state at least once since the state's founding in 1912. Arizona is also one of only two states that voted against Obama in both 2008 and 2012 that his vice president Joe Biden would go on to win in 2020, the other being Georgia.

Until 2020, Arizona had been won by the Republican nominee for president in every election since 1952, except when Bill Clinton narrowly carried the state over Bob Dole in 1996. This is also the most recent time that Arizona has backed the losing candidate in a presidential election and the last time a Democrat won the presidency without winning Arizona.

== Primary elections ==
=== Democratic primary ===
Incumbent President Barack Obama won all the delegates.

=== Republican primary ===
2012 Arizona Republican primary
- February 28, 2012

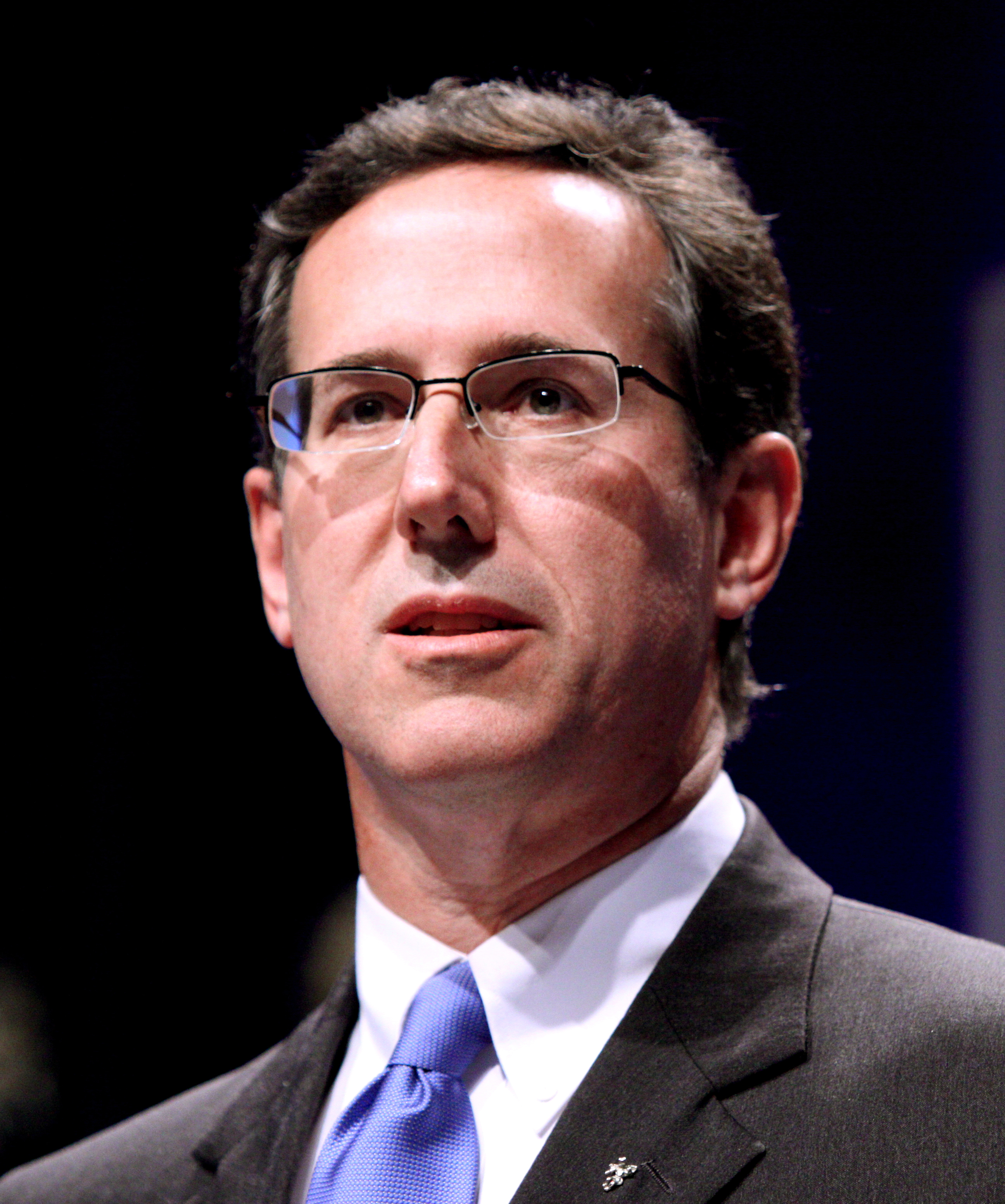

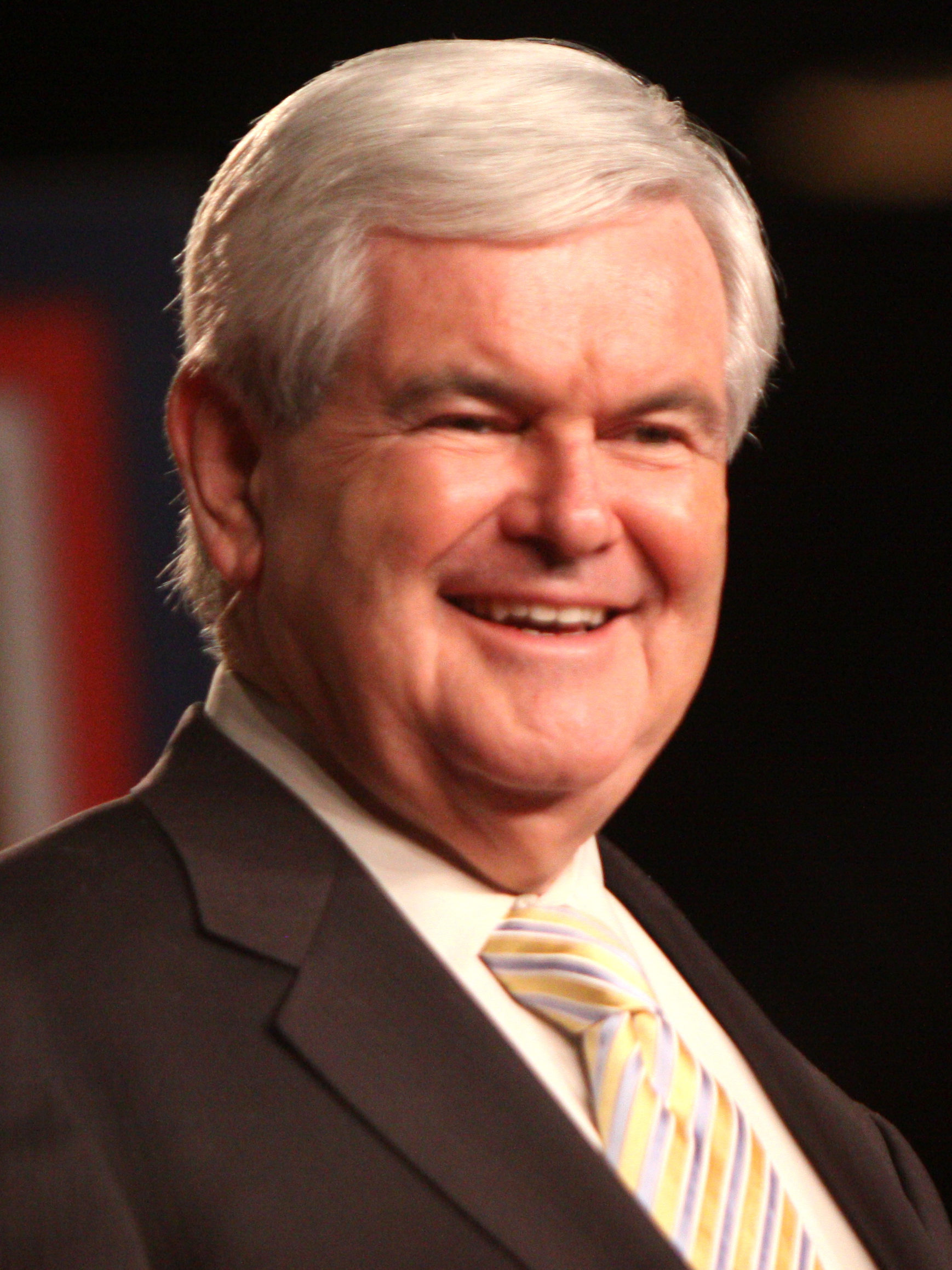

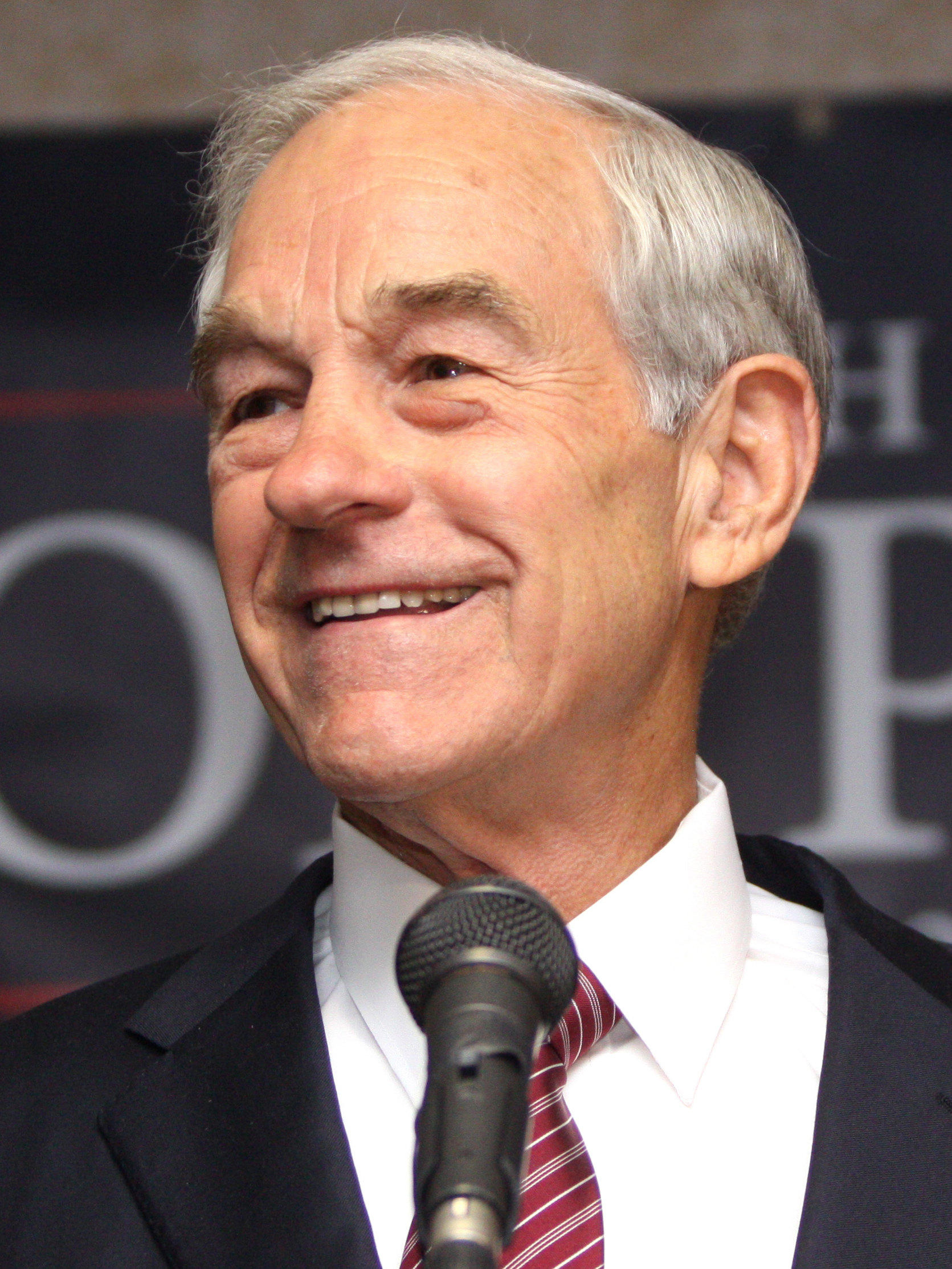
Candidate	Mitt Romney	Rick Santorum
Home state	Massachusetts	Pennsylvania
Delegate count	29	0
Popular vote	239,167	138,031
Percentage	46.87%	27.05%
Candidate	Newt Gingrich	Ron Paul
Home state	Georgia	Texas
Delegate count	0	0
Popular vote	81,748	43,952
Percentage	16.02%	8.61%
Romney
30–40%
40–50%
50–60%
60–70%

The Republican primary was a closed primary that took place on February 28, 2012. More than 1,130,000 registered Republican voters participated in the event, the purpose of which was to select delegates from the state to attend the Republican National Convention on behalf of candidates for the Republican presidential nomination. The Republican National Committee removed half of Arizona's delegate allocation because the state committee moved its Republican primary before March 6. Arizona therefore held a ballot to select 29 proportionally-allocated delegates. This election occurred the same day as the Michigan Republican primary. The Arizona primary was set as a winner-take-all contest, another violation of RNC delegate allocation rules, which require proportional allocation for all primaries held before April 1. Endorsements from 2008 primary rival and U.S. Senator John McCain and Governor Jan Brewer helped add to the prospects of a victory for Romney in Arizona.

==== Project White House ====
The small alternative newspaper Tucson Weekly, for the second election in a row, has sponsored an event called "Project White House" in which it gets as many ordinary citizens on the ballot as it possibly can. Afterward, a series of "reality show style" competitions occurred, including candidate meet-and-greets, and two televised debates which were sponsored by the Tucson Weekly, a local public-access television show called Illegal Knowledge, and local public television stations.

The two debates took place on February 18 and February 19, 2012, both were commercial-free, one hour long each, and both aired on Access Tucson while they were streamed live on the internet. Both debates were produced in conjunction with Project White House and Jim Nintzel of the Tucson Weekly.

The first debate, held on the 18th at 8 pm MST, produced by Illegal Knowledge and hosted by Dave Maass of San Diego CityBeat, had nine participants, composed of eight lesser known Republican candidates (Donald Benjamin, Simon Bollander, Cesar Cisneros, Kip Dean, Sarah Gonzales, Al "Dick" Perry, Charles Skelley and Jim Terr) and one Green Party candidate (Michael Oatman). A press release regarding this first debate was distributed which invited all candidates listed on either Republican or Green Party ballots in Arizona to the first debate, although none of the major Republican or Green Party candidates appeared.

The second debate, held on the 19th at 7pm MST, produced by Access Tucson and hosted by both Dave Maass of San Diego CityBeat and Amanda Hurley of The University of Arizona School of Journalism, was restricted only to Republican candidates and featured seven of the eight lesser known Republican candidates from the previous night (less Cesar Cisneros).

There was a third Arizona debate which took place in Mesa, AZ on February 22, 2012, but was not associated with Project White House and had only invited the four major Republican candidates to participate.

Two lesser known candidates appearing in the first debates, Sarah Gonzales (who placed sixth) and Michael Oatman (who placed tied for third), placed ahead of their better known Republican and Green Party counterparts (Buddy Roemer and Gerard Davis respectively) in the Arizona Presidential Preference Election Results from February 28, 2012.

==== Campaign ====
Former Massachusetts Governor Mitt Romney, Texas Congressman Ron Paul, Former Louisiana Governor Buddy Roemer, Former Speaker of the House Newt Gingrich, and Former Pennsylvania Senator Rick Santorum were contesting and campaigning in the Arizona primary.

Televised debates in Arizona were held on February 18 and 19, 2012, on Public-access television and February 22, 2012, on CNN. Only the major Republican candidates, except for Roemer, were invited to the third, and none of them attended the first two.

Twenty-three candidates appeared on the presidential primary ballot, 11 of whom are residents of the state.

==== Results ====
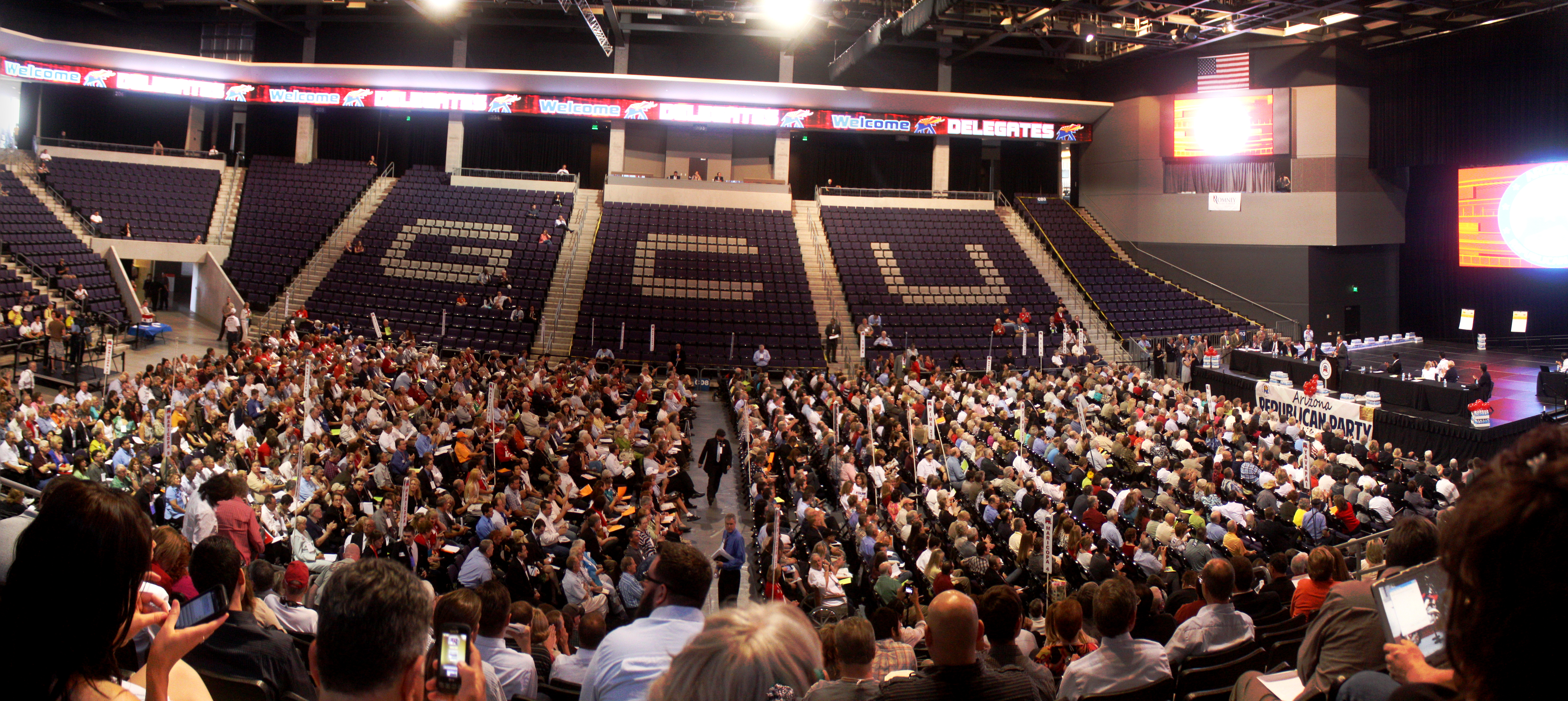
The 2012 Arizona Republican state convention, which determined delegates who would be sent to the RNC.

Arizona was allocated 29 delegates because it moved its primary to February 28.

Voter turnout = 45.3%

Arizona Republican primary, 2012
Candidate	Votes	Percentage	Delegates
Mitt Romney	239,167	46.87%	26
Rick Santorum	138,031	27.05%	0
Newt Gingrich	81,748	16.02%	0
Ron Paul	43,952	8.61%	3
Rick Perry (withdrawn)	2,023	0.40%	0
Sarah Gonzales	1,544	0.30%	0
Buddy Roemer (withdrawn)	692	0.14%	0
Paul Sims	530	0.10%	0
Cesar Cisneros	418	0.08%	0
Mark Callahan	358	0.07%	0
Al "Dick" Perry	310	0.06%	0
Donald Benjamin	223	0.04%	0
Michael Levinson	217	0.04%	0
Kip Dean	198	0.04%	0
Ronald Zack	156	0.03%	0
Christopher Hill	139	0.03%	0
Frank Lynch	110	0.02%	0
Wayne Charles Arnett	96	0.02%	0
Raymond Scott Perkins	90	0.02%	0
Matt Welch	86	0.02%	0
Jim Terr	59	0.01%	0
Charles Skelley	57	0.01%	0
Simon Bollander	54	0.01%	0
Total:	510,258	100.00%	29

== General election ==
=== Predictions ===
Source	Ranking	As of
Huffington Post	Tossup	November 6, 2012
CNN	Lean R	November 6, 2012
The New York Times	Lean R	November 6, 2012
The Washington Post	Safe R	November 6, 2012
RealClearPolitics	Lean R	November 6, 2012
Sabato's Crystal Ball	Solid R	November 5, 2012
FiveThirtyEight	Solid R	November 6, 2012

=== Ballot access ===
- Mitt Romney/Paul Ryan, Republican
- Barack Obama/Joseph Biden, Democratic
- Gary Johnson/James P. Gray, Libertarian
- Jill Stein/Cheri Honkala, Green

Write-in candidate access:

- Virgil Goode/Jim Clymer, Constitution
- Rocky Anderson/Luis J. Rodriguez, Justice

=== Results ===
2012 United States presidential election in Arizona
Party	Candidate	Running mate	Votes	Percentage	Electoral votes
Republican	Mitt Romney	Paul Ryan	1,233,654	53.48%	11
Democratic	Barack Obama (incumbent)	Joe Biden (incumbent)	1,025,232	44.45%	0
Libertarian	Gary Johnson	Jim Gray	32,100	1.39%	0
Green	Jill Stein	Cheri Honkala	7,816	0.34%	0
Constitution	Virgil Goode	Jim Clymer	289	0.01%	0
Justice	Rocky Anderson	Luis J. Rodriguez	119	0.01%	0
Other Write-In	Other Write-In		7,349	0.32%	0
Totals			2,306,559	100.00%	11

==== By county ====
County	Mitt Romney Republican		Barack Obama Democratic		Various candidates Other parties		Margin		Total
County	#	%	#	%	#	%	#	%	Total
Apache	8,250	31.83%	17,147	66.16%	520	2.01%	-8,897	-34.33%	25,917
Cochise	29,497	59.95%	18,546	37.69%	1,158	2.35%	10,951	22.26%	49,201
Coconino	21,220	40.84%	29,257	56.30%	1,485	2.86%	-8,037	-15.46%	51,962
Gila	13,455	62.31%	7,697	35.64%	443	2.05%	5,758	26.67%	21,595
Graham	8,076	67.84%	3,609	30.31%	220	1.85%	4,467	37.53%	11,905
Greenlee	1,592	53.32%	1,310	43.87%	84	2.81%	282	9.45%	2,986
La Paz	3,714	64.76%	1,880	32.78%	141	2.46%	1,834	31.98%	5,735
Maricopa	749,885	54.30%	602,288	43.61%	28,786	2.08%	147,597	10.69%	1,380,959
Mohave	49,168	69.91%	19,533	27.77%	1,627	2.31%	29,635	42.14%	70,328
Navajo	19,884	53.07%	16,945	45.23%	636	1.70%	2,939	7.84%	37,465
Pima	174,779	45.61%	201,251	52.52%	7,143	1.86%	-26,472	-6.91%	383,173
Pinal	62,079	57.12%	44,306	40.77%	2,297	2.11%	17,773	16.35%	108,682
Santa Cruz	4,235	30.44%	9,486	68.19%	190	1.37%	-5,251	-37.75%	13,911
Yavapai	64,468	64.04%	33,918	33.69%	2,281	2.27%	30,550	30.35%	100,667
Yuma	23,352	55.50%	18,059	42.92%	662	1.57%	5,293	12.58%	42,073
Totals	1,233,654	53.48%	1,025,232	44.45%	47,673	2.07%	208,422	9.03%	2,306,559

==== By congressional district ====
Romney won six of nine districts, including two that elected Democrats.

District	Obama	Romney	Representative
1st	47.89%	50.42%	Ann Kirkpatrick
2nd	48.37%	49.94%	Ron Barber
3rd	61.44%	36.94%	Raúl Grijalva
4th	31.02%	67.19%	Paul Gosar
5th	34.56%	63.76%	Matt Salmon
6th	38.82%	59.52%	David Schweikert
7th	71.7%	26.51%	Ed Pastor
8th	36.87%	61.68%	Trent Franks
9th	51.12%	46.59%	Kyrsten Sinema

== See also ==
- 2012 Republican Party presidential debates and forums
- 2012 Republican Party presidential primaries
- Results of the 2012 Republican Party presidential primaries
- Arizona Republican Party
