= 1928 United States presidential election in Arizona =

- November 6, 1928

All 3 Arizona votes to the Electoral College

Nominee	Herbert Hoover	Al Smith
Party	Republican	Democratic
Home state	California	New York
Running mate	Charles Curtis	Joseph T. Robinson
Electoral vote	3	0
Popular vote	52,533	38,537
Percentage	57.57%	42.23%
County results
Hoover
50–60%
60–70%
Smith
50–60%
President before election
Calvin Coolidge
Republican
Elected President
Herbert Hoover
Republican

The 1928 United States presidential election in Arizona took place on November 6, 1928, as part of the 1928 United States presidential election. State voters chose three representatives, or electors, to the Electoral College, who voted for president and vice president.

Arizona was won by former U.S. Secretary of Commerce Herbert Hoover (R–California), running with U.S. Senator from Kansas Charles Curtis, with 57.57% of the popular vote, against Governor of New York Al Smith (D–New York), running with U.S. Senator from Arkansas Joseph Taylor Robinson, with 42.23% of the popular vote.

Hoover would be the final Republican presidential candidate to win Arizona, or to even carry a single county in the state, until Dwight D. Eisenhower in 1952.

== Results ==
1928 United States presidential election in Arizona
Party	Candidate	Votes	%
Republican	Herbert Hoover	52,533	57.57%
Democratic	Al Smith	38,537	42.23%
Communist	William Z. Foster	184	0.20%
Majority		13,966	15.34%
Total votes		91,254	100.00%

=== Results by county ===
County	Herbert Hoover Republican		Al Smith Democratic		William Z. Foster Communist		Margin		Total votes cast
County	#	%	#	%	#	%	#	%	Total votes cast
Apache	837	51.41%	791	48.59%	0	0.00%	46	2.83%	1,628
Cochise	5,776	57.28%	4,262	42.27%	45	0.45%	1,514	15.02%	10,083
Coconino	1,717	59.19%	1,172	40.40%	12	0.41%	545	18.79%	2,901
Gila	3,436	50.60%	3,341	49.20%	13	0.19%	95	1.40%	6,790
Graham	1,238	43.27%	1,615	56.45%	8	0.28%	-377	-13.18%	2,861
Greenlee	685	42.08%	935	57.43%	8	0.49%	-250	-15.36%	1,628
Maricopa	20,089	62.25%	12,146	37.64%	34	0.11%	7,943	24.61%	32,269
Mohave	1,127	60.33%	728	38.97%	13	0.70%	399	21.36%	1,868
Navajo	1,608	54.99%	1,316	45.01%	0	0.00%	292	9.99%	2,924
Pima	6,635	56.94%	4,976	42.70%	42	0.36%	1,659	14.24%	11,653
Pinal	1,631	53.41%	1,419	46.46%	4	0.13%	212	6.94%	3,054
Santa Cruz	919	48.78%	962	51.06%	3	0.16%	-43	-2.28%	1,884
Yavapai	4,507	57.83%	3,285	42.15%	2	0.03%	1,222	15.68%	7,794
Yuma	2,328	59.43%	1,589	40.57%	0	0.00%	739	18.87%	3,917
Totals	52,533	57.57%	38,537	42.23%	184	0.20%	13,996	15.34%	91,254

==== Counties that flipped from Democratic to Republican ====
- Gila

=== Electors ===
Electors were chosen by their party's voters in primary elections held on September 11, 1928.

Al Smith & Joseph T. Robinson Democratic Party	Herbert Hoover & Charles Curtis Republican Party	William Z. Foster & Benjamin Gitlow Communist Party
Cassie J. Pomeroy; Mrs. J. Andrew West; Bradford Duncan	Mrs. R. L. Hoyal; J. Homer Smith; Fred S. Breen	Frank I. Lowe; E. J. Bryan; F. N. Logan
