= 1992 United States presidential election in Arizona =

- November 3, 1992
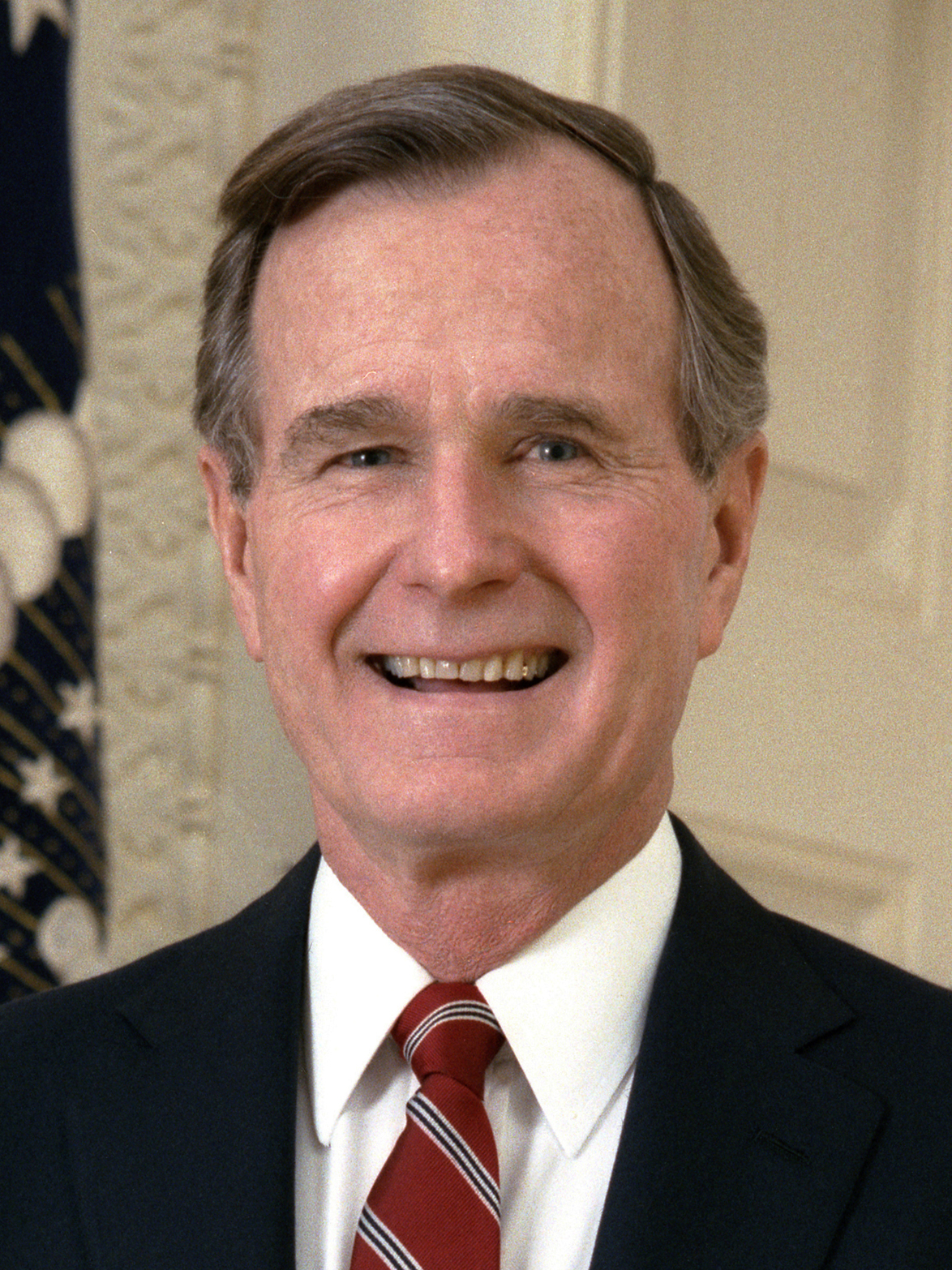

Nominee	George H. W. Bush	Bill Clinton	Ross Perot
Party	Republican	Democratic	Independent
Home state	Texas	Arkansas	Texas
Running mate	Dan Quayle	Al Gore	James Stockdale
Electoral vote	8	0	0
Popular vote	572,086	543,050	353,741
Percentage	38.47%	36.52%	23.79%
County results
Bush
30–40%
40–50%
Clinton
30–40%
40–50%
60–70%
President before election
George H. W. Bush
Republican
Elected President
Bill Clinton
Democratic

The 1992 United States presidential election in Arizona took place on November 3, 1992, as part of the 1992 United States presidential election. Voters chose eight representatives, or electors to the Electoral College, who voted for president and vice president.

Arizona was won by incumbent President George H. W. Bush (R-Texas) with 38.5% of the popular vote over Governor Bill Clinton (D-Arkansas) with 36.5%. Businessman Ross Perot (I-Texas) finished in third, with 23.8% of the popular vote. Clinton ultimately won the national vote, defeating incumbent President Bush. Bush very narrowly won in Arizona by a margin of 2.0%, and Clinton went on to win the state four years later narrowly over Bob Dole.

In achieving the best performance by a Democrat in Arizona since Lyndon Johnson's landslide in 1964 – when Barry Goldwater held the state by five thousand votes due to a "favorite son" vote in the Phoenix metropolitan area – Clinton broke some notable county droughts. He placed Cochise County in the Democratic camp for the first time since 1964 and last to date, Pima County and Santa Cruz County also voted Democratic for the first time since 1964, whilst Flagstaff's Coconino County voted Democratic for the first time since Harry S. Truman carried it in 1948. These three counties have since stayed reliably Democratic in presidential elections.

== Results ==
1992 United States presidential election in Arizona
Party	Candidate	Votes	Percentage	Electoral votes
Republican	George H. W. Bush (incumbent)	572,086	38.47%	8
Democratic	Bill Clinton	543,050	36.52%	0
Independent	Ross Perot	353,741	23.79%	0
Independent (Note: Gritz was listed as Independent in Arizona)	James "Bo" Gritz	8,141	0.55%	0
Libertarian	Andre Marrou	6,759	0.45%	0
Natural Law	Dr. John Hagelin	2,267	0.15%	0
New Alliance Party	Lenora Fulani	923	0.06%	0
Independent (Note: LaRouche was listed as Independent in Arizona)	Lyndon LaRouche (write-in)	8	0.00%	0
Totals		1,486,975	100.00%	8

=== Results by county ===
County	George H.W. Bush Republican		Bill Clinton Democratic		Ross Perot Independent		Andre Marrou Libertarian		Various candidates Other parties		Margin		Total votes cast
County	#	%	#	%	#	%	#	%	#	%	#	%	Total votes cast
Apache	4,588	25.13%	11,218	61.44%	1,979	10.84%	94	0.51%	379	2.08%	-6,630	-36.31%	18,258
Cochise	12,202	36.81%	12,701	38.31%	7,857	23.70%	149	0.45%	241	0.73%	-499	-1.50%	33,150
Coconino	13,769	32.31%	18,888	44.32%	9,363	21.97%	273	0.64%	325	0.77%	-5,119	-12.01%	42,618
Gila	5,781	31.29%	7,571	40.97%	4,694	25.40%	98	0.53%	334	1.81%	-1,790	-9.68%	18,478
Graham	4,169	42.98%	3,391	34.96%	1,860	19.18%	29	0.30%	250	2.58%	778	8.02%	9,699
Greenlee	1,451	36.34%	1,695	42.45%	794	19.88%	4	0.10%	49	1.23%	-244	-6.11%	3,993
La Paz	1,599	32.23%	1,808	36.44%	1,488	29.99%	31	0.62%	35	0.70%	-209	-4.21%	4,961
Maricopa	360,049	41.06%	285,457	32.56%	221,475	25.26%	3,742	0.43%	6,109	0.70%	74,592	8.50%	876,832
Mohave	13,684	33.69%	13,255	32.63%	12,706	31.28%	280	0.69%	691	1.70%	429	1.06%	40,616
Navajo	7,994	32.45%	10,882	44.17%	4,787	19.43%	139	0.56%	836	3.39%	-2,888	-11.72%	24,638
Pima	97,036	34.47%	128,569	45.68%	53,925	19.16%	1,268	0.45%	686	0.24%	-31,533	-11.21%	281,484
Pinal	11,669	31.76%	15,468	42.10%	9,231	25.13%	136	0.37%	235	0.63%	-3,799	-10.34%	36,739
Santa Cruz	3,024	37.43%	3,512	43.47%	1,447	17.91%	46	0.57%	51	0.63%	-488	-6.04%	8,080
Yavapai	23,419	39.42%	18,268	30.75%	16,409	27.62%	322	0.54%	997	1.67%	5,151	8.67%	59,415
Yuma	11,652	41.55%	10,367	36.97%	5,726	20.42%	148	0.53%	152	0.55%	1,285	4.58%	28,045
Totals	572,086	38.47%	543,050	36.52%	353,741	23.79%	6,759	0.55%	11,370	0.67%	29,036	1.95%	1,487,006

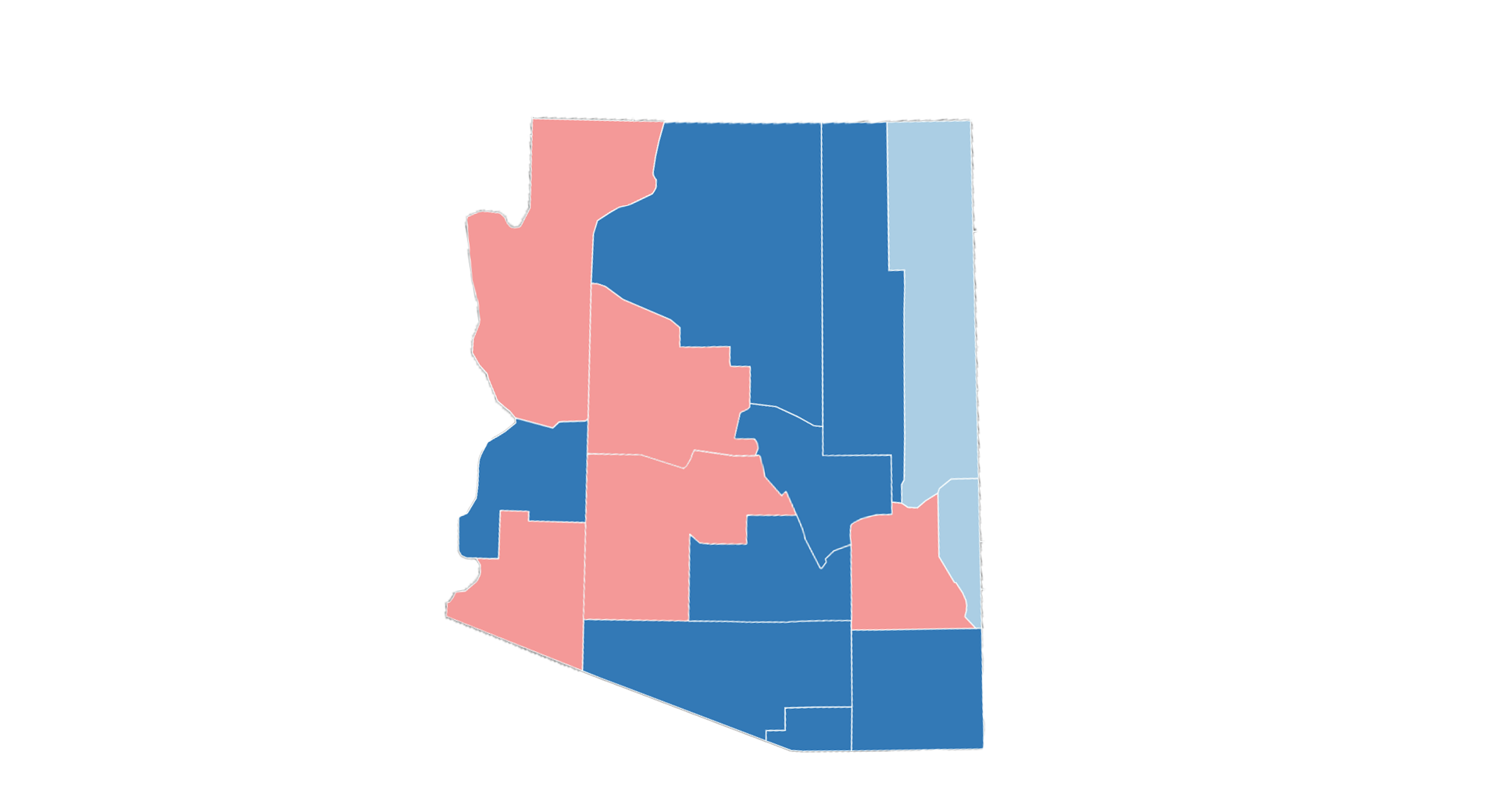
County flips from 1988: Democratic Hold Gain from Republican

==== Counties that flipped from Republican to Democratic ====
- Cochise
- Coconino
- Gila
- La Paz
- Navajo
- Pima
- Pinal
- Santa Cruz

=== Electors ===
Bill Clinton & Al Gore Democratic Party	George H. W. Bush & Dan Quayle Republican Party	Ross Perot & James Stockdale Independent
Heather L. LaMear; Daniel R. Ortega Jr.; Steve Owens; Lois E. Pfau; Christine Rhodes; Robert A. Strauss; Cyvia J. Wohlman; Peterson Zah	Doris H. Berry; Roger M. Esplin; Bettye Henze; Michael E. Morales; Frances Rigo; Patricia A. Roberson; Vernon L. Springer III; Judy Summers	Eleanor Hanes; Steven C. Johnson; Edward John Kimmerie; Franklin F. Mackenzie; John Robert Miller; Walter C. Peters Jr.; Richard E. Rose; Mary Louise Stanley

James "Bo" Gritz & Cyril Minett Independent	Andre Marrou & Nancy Lord Libertarian Party	John Hagelin & Mike Tompkins Natural Law Party	Lenora Fulani & Maria Elizabeth Muñoz New Alliance Party	Lyndon LaRouche & James L. Bevel Independent
Maria-Cristina Chadwick; Douglas G. Dever; Michael A. Duane; Mary G. Gillespie; Clare L. Reading; James L. Reading; Richard Hank Rogers; Yvonne A. Turley	June Pearce Boudette; Robert R. Bulechek; Lloyd Lawson Clucas; Eric J. Ewing; Gay Lynn Goetzke; Kathy L. Harrer; Lawrence W. Jerome; Don Markowski	Janet F. Cohn; William C. Fisher II; Deborah J. Goldstein; Ted J. Goldstein; Thomas J. Growney; Darleen M. Kasian; Evelyn Romaine; Karen Shapiro	C. Joseph Betancourt; Thomas Elliott; Charlene Elizabeth Johnson; Carolyn T. Lowery; Marie Mogen; Gene Pahnke; Thomasita E. Taylor; Fonz West	Duane A. Brasch; John W. Cartwright; William R. DesAutel; Francis E. Foster; L. Ardis Hamer; John B. Kunkel; Marian Kriebel Mercado; L. Earline Weddle
