= 1948 United States presidential election in Arizona =

- November 2, 1948

All 4 Arizona votes to the Electoral College

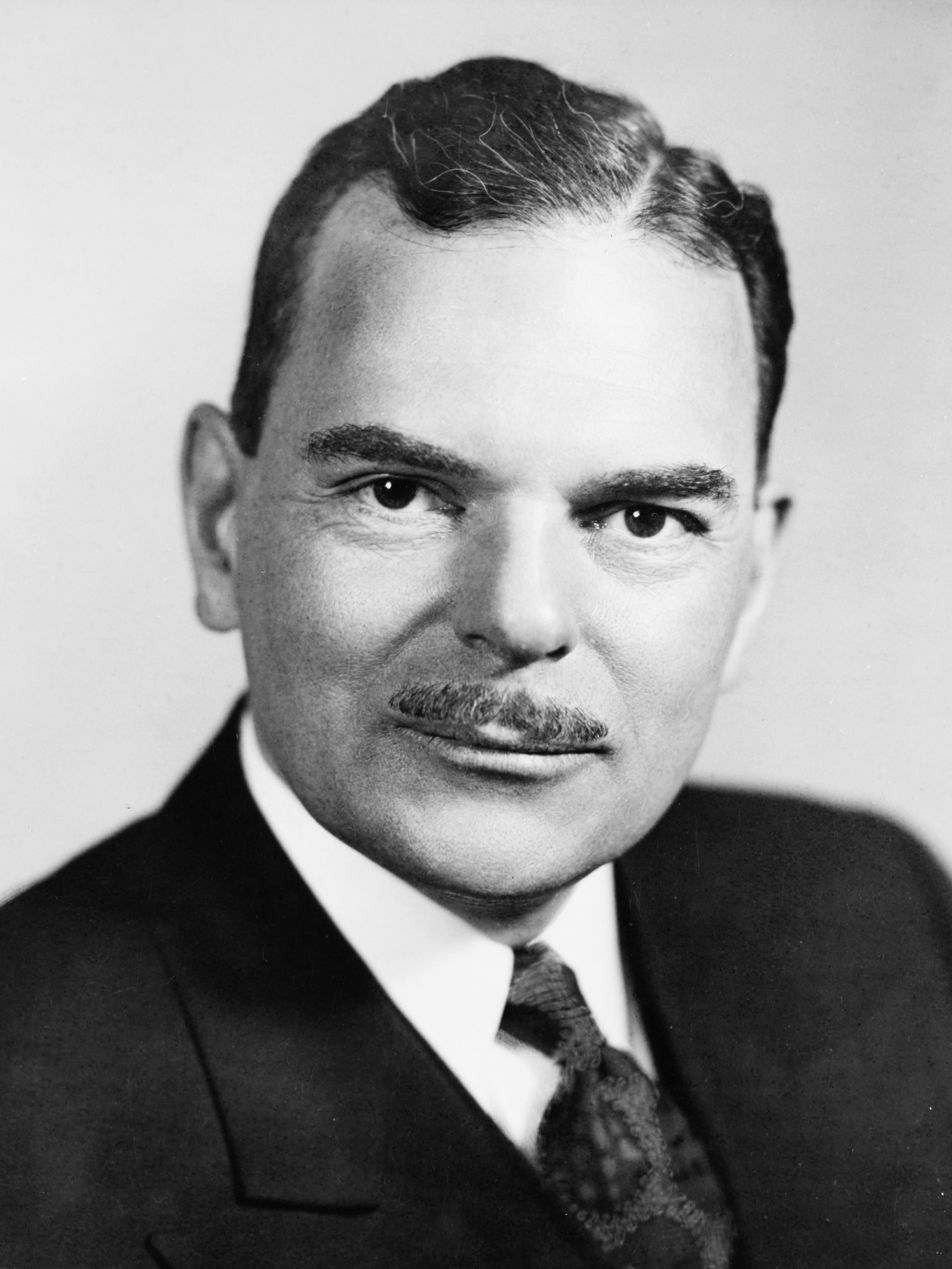
| Nominee | Harry S. Truman | Thomas E. Dewey |
| Party | Democratic | Republican |
| Home state | Missouri | New York |
| Running mate | Alben W. Barkley | Earl Warren |
| Electoral vote | 4 | 0 |
| Popular vote | 95,251 | 77,597 |
| Percentage | 53.79% | 43.82% |
President before election
Harry S. Truman
Democratic
Elected President
Harry S. Truman
Democratic

The 1948 United States presidential election in Arizona took place on November 2, 1948, as part of the 1948 United States presidential election. State voters chose four representatives, or electors, to the Electoral College, who voted for president and vice president.

Arizona was won by incumbent President Harry S. Truman (D–Missouri), running with Senator Alben W. Barkley, with 53.79% of the popular vote, against Governor Thomas Dewey (R–New York), running with Governor Earl Warren, with 43.82% of the popular vote.

As of the 2024 presidential election, this is the last election in which Yavapai County voted for a Democratic presidential candidate. Maricopa County would not vote Democratic again until 2020. Coconino County would not vote Democratic again until 1992, Navajo County not until 1976, while Apache, Cochise, Mohave and Pima Counties would next vote Democratic for Lyndon Johnson in 1964.

Nonetheless, Dewey remains the last Republican presidential candidate to never receive Electoral Votes from Arizona. Bob Dole received Electoral Votes from the state during his unsuccessful bid for Vice President in 1976, but lost the state in 1996. Donald Trump would win the state in 2016, and later in 2024.

This is also the last election where a candidate carried every county in the state and the last time a Democrat won the state with an outright majority. It is also the last time Arizona voted more Democratic than the nation as a whole.

Arizona would vote Republican in every election thereafter except 1996 and 2020. Arizona has never backed a Democratic nominee who lost the presidential election.

== Results ==
1948 United States presidential election in Arizona
| Party | Candidate | Votes | % |
|---|---|---|---|
| Democratic | Harry S. Truman (inc.) | 95,251 | 53.79% |
| Republican | Thomas E. Dewey | 77,597 | 43.82% |
| Progressive | Henry A. Wallace | 3,310 | 1.87% |
| Prohibition | Claude A. Watson | 786 | 0.44% |
| Socialist Labor | Edward A. Teichert | 121 | 0.07% |
| Majority | | 17,654 | 9.97% |
| Total votes | | 177,065 | 100.00% |

=== Results by county ===
| County | Harry S. Truman Democratic | | Thomas E. Dewey Republican | | Henry A. Wallace Progressive | | Claude A. Watson Prohibition | | Edward A. Teichert Socialist Labor | | Margin | | Total votes cast |
| County | # | % | # | % | # | % | # | % | # | % | # | % | Total votes cast |
|---|---|---|---|---|---|---|---|---|---|---|---|---|---|
| Apache | 1,480 | 60.29% | 970 | 39.51% | 5 | 0.20% | 0 | 0.00% | 0 | 0.00% | 510 | 20.78% | 2,455 |
| Cochise | 6,198 | 59.77% | 3,854 | 37.16% | 284 | 2.74% | 29 | 0.28% | 5 | 0.05% | 2,344 | 22.61% | 10,370 |
| Coconino | 2,309 | 51.99% | 2,093 | 47.13% | 26 | 0.59% | 11 | 0.25% | 2 | 0.05% | 216 | 4.86% | 4,441 |
| Gila | 4,780 | 65.79% | 2,329 | 32.06% | 120 | 1.65% | 31 | 0.43% | 5 | 0.07% | 2,451 | 33.73% | 7,265 |
| Graham | 2,139 | 63.17% | 1,209 | 35.71% | 31 | 0.92% | 6 | 0.18% | 1 | 0.03% | 930 | 27.46% | 3,386 |
| Greenlee | 2,069 | 69.88% | 680 | 22.97% | 202 | 6.82% | 8 | 0.27% | 2 | 0.07% | 1,389 | 46.91% | 2,961 |
| Maricopa | 40,498 | 51.27% | 36,585 | 46.31% | 1,403 | 1.78% | 459 | 0.58% | 47 | 0.06% | 3,913 | 4.96% | 78,992 |
| Mohave | 1,499 | 55.27% | 1,167 | 43.03% | 32 | 1.18% | 8 | 0.29% | 6 | 0.22% | 332 | 12.24% | 2,712 |
| Navajo | 2,669 | 58.45% | 1,841 | 40.32% | 45 | 0.99% | 8 | 0.18% | 3 | 0.07% | 828 | 18.13% | 4,566 |
| Pima | 17,692 | 49.66% | 16,968 | 47.63% | 807 | 2.27% | 120 | 0.34% | 38 | 0.11% | 724 | 2.03% | 35,625 |
| Pinal | 3,572 | 60.68% | 2,232 | 37.91% | 61 | 1.04% | 20 | 0.34% | 2 | 0.03% | 1,340 | 22.77% | 5,887 |
| Santa Cruz | 1,424 | 56.53% | 1,058 | 42.00% | 26 | 1.03% | 10 | 0.40% | 1 | 0.04% | 366 | 14.53% | 2,519 |
| Yavapai | 4,439 | 49.75% | 4,287 | 48.05% | 132 | 1.48% | 60 | 0.67% | 4 | 0.04% | 152 | 1.70% | 8,922 |
| Yuma | 4,483 | 64.37% | 2,324 | 33.37% | 141 | 2.02% | 11 | 0.16% | 5 | 0.07% | 2,159 | 31.00% | 6,964 |
| Totals | 95,251 | 53.79% | 77,597 | 43.82% | 3,310 | 1.87% | 786 | 0.44% | 121 | 0.07% | 17,654 | 9.97% | 177,065 |

== Electors ==
Electors were chosen by their party's voters in primary elections held on September 7, 1948.

| Harry S. Truman & Alben W. Barkley Democratic Party | Thomas E. Dewey & Earl Warren Republican Party | Henry A. Wallace & Glen H. Taylor Progressive Party | Claude A. Watson & Dale Learn Prohibition Party | Edward A. Teichert & Stephen Emery Socialist Labor Party |
|---|---|---|---|---|
| A. J. Beaty; Ed Cahill; Austin Jay; Lorna Lockwood | Richard H. Chambers; J. C. Dolan; James G. McNary; Ed R. Spear | Sarah E. Brown; J. A. Russ; Al Schlackman; Tomas Ybarra | Richard S. Beal; Esther LeMay; Samuel P. Smith; J. F. Yardell | Arthur K. Burden; Leo F. Gillespie; Jules Golden; Nancy Golden |

== See also ==
- United States presidential elections in Arizona
