= 1952 United States presidential election in Arizona =

- November 4, 1952

All 4 Arizona votes to the Electoral College

Nominee	Dwight D. Eisenhower	Adlai Stevenson
Party	Republican	Democratic
Home state	New York	Illinois
Running mate	Richard Nixon	John Sparkman
Electoral vote	4	0
Popular vote	152,042	108,528
Percentage	58.35%	41.65%

Eisenhower
50–60%
60–70%
Stevenson
50–60%
60–70%
President before election
Harry S. Truman
Democratic
Elected President
Dwight D. Eisenhower
Republican

The 1952 United States presidential election in Arizona took place on November 4, 1952, as part of the 1952 United States presidential election. State voters chose four representatives, or electors, to the Electoral College, who voted for president and vice president.

Arizona was won by Columbia University President Dwight D. Eisenhower (R–New York), running with California Senator Richard Nixon, with 58.35% of the popular vote, against Adlai Stevenson (D–Illinois), running with Alabama Senator John Sparkman, with 41.65% of the popular vote.

With his win in the state, Eisenhower became the first Republican presidential candidate since Herbert Hoover in 1928 to win the state, or to even carry any counties.

This election would signal the beginning of a long Republican dominance in elections in Arizona; Republicans would go on to carry the state in every single presidential election except 1996 and 2020, and would maintain control of at least one of the state's Senate seats until the latter election.

== Results ==
1952 United States presidential election in Arizona
Party	Candidate	Votes	%
Republican	Dwight D. Eisenhower	152,042	58.35%
Democratic	Adlai Stevenson	108,528	41.65%
Majority		43,514	16.70%
Total votes		260,570	100.00%

=== Results by county ===
County	Dwight D. Eisenhower Republican		Adlai Stevenson Democratic		Margin		Total votes cast
County	#	%	#	%	#	%	Total votes cast
Apache	1,767	59.70%	1,193	40.30%	574	19.40%	2,960
Cochise	6,495	53.52%	5,640	46.48%	855	7.04%	12,135
Coconino	3,827	61.38%	2,408	38.62%	1,419	22.76%	6,235
Gila	3,770	43.34%	4,928	56.66%	-1,158	-13.32%	8,698
Graham	2,191	49.90%	2,200	50.10%	-9	-0.20%	4,391
Greenlee	1,377	31.32%	3,019	68.68%	-1,642	-37.36%	4,396
Maricopa	77,249	60.57%	50,285	39.43%	26,964	21.14%	127,534
Mohave	1,746	62.09%	1,066	37.91%	680	24.18%	2,812
Navajo	3,478	57.29%	2,593	42.71%	885	14.58%	6,071
Pima	32,113	60.19%	21,237	39.81%	10,876	20.38%	53,350
Pinal	4,985	52.44%	4,522	47.56%	463	4.88%	9,507
Santa Cruz	1,716	55.70%	1,365	44.30%	351	11.40%	3,081
Yavapai	6,567	64.41%	3,628	35.59%	2,939	28.82%	10,195
Yuma	4,761	51.72%	4,444	48.28%	317	3.44%	9,205
Totals	152,042	58.35%	108,528	41.65%	43,514	16.70%	260,570

==== Counties that flipped from Democratic to Republican ====
- Apache
- Cochise
- Coconino
- Maricopa
- Mohave
- Navajo
- Pima
- Pinal
- Santa Cruz
- Yavapai
- Yuma

== Electors ==
Electors were chosen by their party's voters in primary elections held on September 9, 1952.

Adlai Stevenson & John Sparkman Democratic Party	Dwight D. Eisenhower & Richard Nixon Republican Party
Ana Frohmiller; Howard D. Grant; Joe Hunt; L. Alton Riggs	Sam Dick; Guy Anderson; Laurens L. Henderson; F. B. Patterson

== See also ==
- United States presidential elections in Arizona
