= 2020 United States presidential election in Arizona =

- November 3, 2020
- Turnout: 79.9% (of registered voters) ▲

Nominee	Joe Biden	Donald Trump
Party	Democratic	Republican
Home state	Delaware	Florida
Running mate	Kamala Harris	Mike Pence
Electoral vote	11	0
Popular vote	1,672,143	1,661,686
Percentage	49.36%	49.06%

Biden
40–50%
50–60%
60–70%
70–80%
80–90%
90–100%
Trump
40–50%
50–60%
60–70%
70–80%
80–90%
90–100%
Tie/No Data
President before election
Donald Trump
Republican
Elected President
Joe Biden
Democratic

The 2020 United States presidential election in Arizona was held on Tuesday, November 3, 2020, as part of the 2020 United States presidential election, in which all 50 states and the District of Columbia participated. Arizona voters chose 11 electors to represent them in the Electoral College via a popular vote pitting incumbent Republican President Donald Trump of Florida and his running mate, incumbent Vice President Mike Pence of Indiana, against Democratic challenger and former Vice President Joe Biden of Delaware and his running mate, United States Senator Kamala Harris of California. The Libertarian nominees were also on the ballot. This is the closest presidential election in Arizona history, surpassing the previous closest of 1964, in which Barry Goldwater won the state by just under a single percentage point.

Trump carried Arizona in 2016 by 3.5%, and it was considered a vital battleground in this election. The state's bitterly competitive nature was attributed to the rapid growth of Maricopa County, a traditionally Republican stronghold that holds 61.6% of the state's population. Biden became the first Democrat to win Arizona since Bill Clinton in 1996, and only the second since Harry S. Truman in 1948. He is also the first Democrat to win Maricopa County since Truman, with a margin of 2.2%, or 45,109 votes. High turnout among Hispanic/Latino and Native American voters was also seen as vital. Polls of the state throughout the campaign generally showed a Biden lead, albeit by a slender margin. Prior to election day, 11 of the 16 news organizations considered that Arizona was leaning towards Biden; the other five considered it a toss-up. Arizona was the second-closest state in 2020, the only closer state being Georgia, marking the first time since 1948 that the Democratic nominee won both Sun Belt states in the same presidential election (Clinton won each state in separate elections). This was also the first time since 1932 that a non-incumbent Democrat carried Arizona in a presidential election, or that an incumbent Republican lost the state. Arizona weighed in as 4.15 percentage points more Republican than the nation in 2020. Arizona is also one of only two states that backed Biden that didn't back Barack Obama in either of his runs for president in 2008 and 2012, the other being Georgia.

After the election, the Republican-majority Arizona Senate launched a Maricopa County-based publicly-funded investigation into the election fraud alleged by Trump and his supporters. The controversial audit, completed in September 2021, found no evidence to support claims of significant election irregularities. Additionally, the audit found a 360 vote larger margin for Biden than what the earlier, certified results had given.

On April 24, 2024, Arizona Attorney General Kris Mayes announced that a grand jury has indicted eleven fake electors and seven Trump allies, including Rudy Giuliani and Mark Meadows, for their roles in attempting to overturn the results for Trump.

== Primary elections ==
=== Canceled Republican primary ===
On September 9, 2019, the Arizona Republican Party became one of several state Republican parties to officially cancel their respective primaries and caucuses. Donald Trump's re-election campaign and GOP officials have cited the fact that Republicans canceled several state primaries when George H. W. Bush and George W. Bush sought a second term in 1992 and 2004, respectively; and Democrats scrapped some of their primaries when Bill Clinton and Barack Obama were seeking reelection in 1996 and 2012, respectively.

Of the 57 total delegates, 3 were allocated to each of the state's 9 congressional districts, 10 to at-large delegates, and another 3 to pledged party leaders and elected officials (PLEO delegates). 17 bonus delegates were also allocated.

The state party still formally conducted the higher meetings in their walking subcaucus-type delegate selection system. The legislative district and county conventions were held from February 8 to April 11 to select delegates to the Arizona State Republican Convention. At the Arizona State Republican Convention, which took place on May 9, the state party formally bound all 57 of its national pledged delegates to Trump. A May 15 email from the Arizona GOP stated that "every one of our ... delegates ... elected pledged to support Donald Trump and Mike Pence as the Republican Party's 2020 nominees for President and Vice President!"

The 54 pledged delegates Arizona sent to the national convention were joined by 3 pledged PLEO delegates, consisting of the National Committeeman, National Committeewoman, and chairman of the Arizona Republican Party.

=== Democratic primary ===
The Arizona Democratic primary took place on March 17, 2020, on the same date as the Democratic primaries in Florida and Illinois. Former Vice President Joe Biden won the primary with 43.7% of the vote and 38 delegates, running ahead of Senator Bernie Sanders from Vermont, who received 32.7% of the vote and 29 delegates. No other candidates received any delegates and the only other candidates to receive more than 1% of the vote were Senator Elizabeth Warren from Massachusetts, with 5.8%, and former South Bend, Indiana Mayor Pete Buttigieg, with 4.1%. Both Warren and Buttigieg withdrew prior to the contest. The other candidates on the ballot comprised a collective 1.2% of the vote.

Biden won 13 of 15 counties in the state of Arizona, with Sanders winning Coconino (home to Flagstaff) and Yuma (home to its eponymous city) counties.

The official vote totals reported by the Arizona Secretary of State added up to 86.7%, as the remaining 13.3% of the vote was composed of candidates whose individual vote totals were not reported.

Popular vote share by county Map legend: Biden – 40–50%; Biden – 50–60%; Sanders – 30–40%; Sanders – 40–50%

2020 Arizona Democratic presidential primary
Candidate	Votes	%	Delegates
Joe Biden	268,029	43.7%	38
Bernie Sanders	200,456	32.7%	29
Elizabeth Warren (withdrawn†)	35,537	5.8%	0
Pete Buttigieg (withdrawn†)	24,868	4.1%	0
Tulsi Gabbard	3,014	0.5%	0
Andrew Yang (withdrawn)	1,921	0.3%	0
Julian Castro (withdrawn)	754	0.1%	0
Marianne Williamson (withdrawn)	668	0.1%	0
Roque De La Fuente III	628	0.1%	0
Deval Patrick (withdrawn)	242	0.0%	0
Henry Hewes	208	0.0%	0
Michael A. Ellinger	184	0.0%	0
Total	536,509 (Note: Total of candidates officially reported, of 613,355 ballots cast.)	86.7% (Note: Percentages reported by the Arizona Secretary of State do not add up to 100. This may be due to the fact that candidates who formally withdrew (Bennet, Bloomberg, Booker, Delaney, Klobuchar, and Steyer) do not have their vote totals officially reported.)	67

†Candidate withdrew after early voting started.

== General election ==
=== Campaign ===
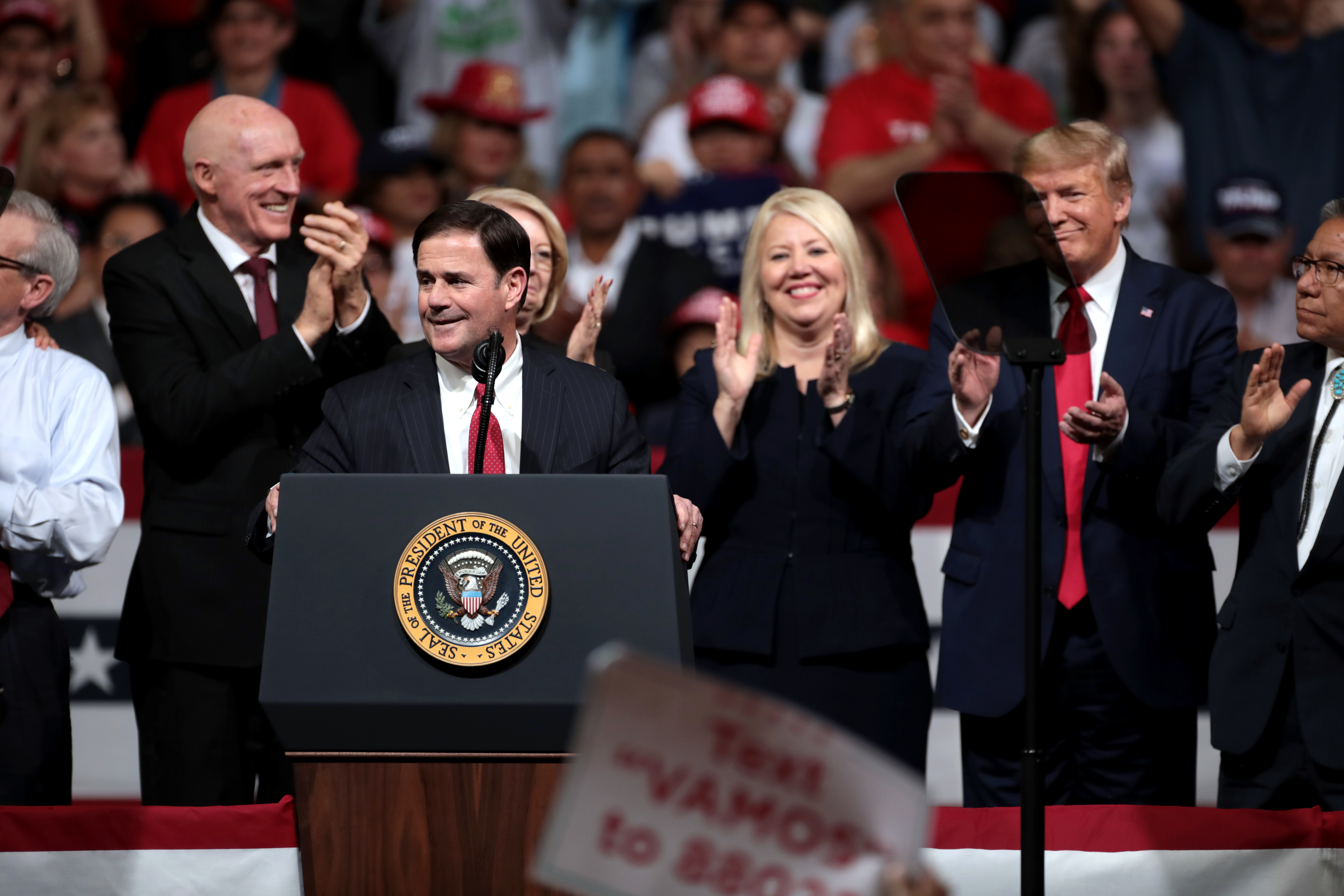
February 19, 2020: (from left) Speaker of the Arizona House Russell Bowers, Governor Doug Ducey, Congresswoman Debbie Lesko, President Trump and Navajo vice president Myron Lizer at a rally at Arizona Veterans Memorial Coliseum in Phoenix.

Arizona was a heavily contested state throughout the election. Once a reliably Republican state, it has trended more Democratic in recent years, with Trump winning it by just 3.5% in 2016. Compared to past Republicans, Trump's performance was historically weak: Mitt Romney won it with a 9.0% margin in 2012 over Barack Obama, John McCain by 8.5% (Note: Arizona was John McCain's home state.) in 2008 also against Obama, and George W. Bush by 10.5% in 2004 against John Kerry. Arizona was one of just ten states to swing more Democratic in 2016, and its 5.5 percentage point swing was the fourth largest in the country. The swing mirrored a nationwide pattern where suburban voters, formerly the principal Republican voting base, swung deep into the Democratic column. Arizona's leftward swing was also credited to a rapidly growing Hispanic population.

Both candidates spent massive amounts of money on advertising, though Biden outspent Trump 2–1.

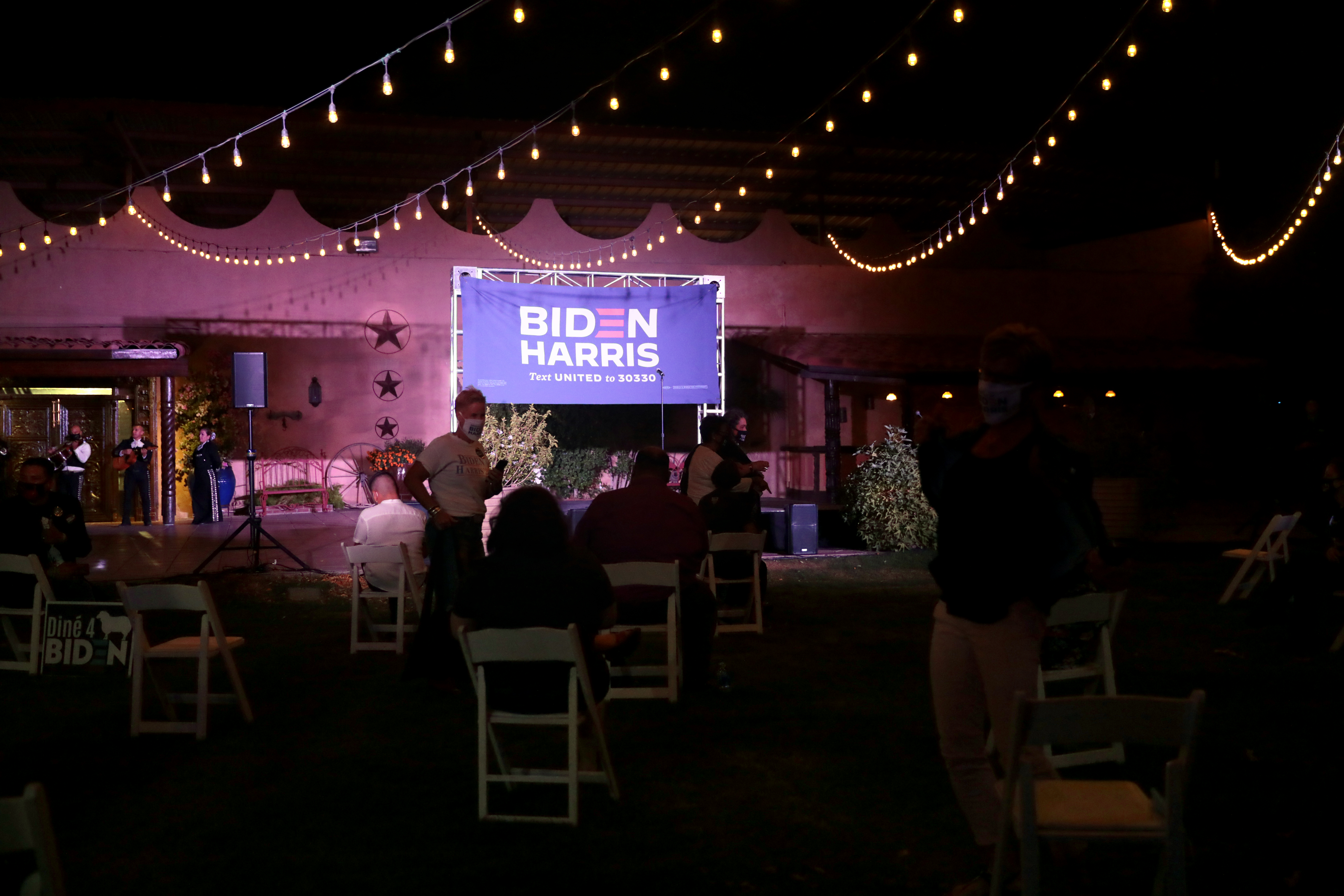
October 25, 2020: Campaign rally for Joe Biden at Corona Ranch and Rodeo Grounds in Phoenix, featuring Cher.

Trump visited Arizona significantly more than his opponent, holding 4 rallies in just one week, compared to Biden, who only visited the state once. Trump favored large rallies with thousands of people in attendance, oftentimes without masks and contrary to the advice of health officials.

At his rallies, Trump campaigned with the Republican Governor of Arizona, Doug Ducey, as well as Republican Senator Martha McSally, in a bid to help her win against Democrat Mark Kelly in the 2020 United States Senate special election.

=== Final predictions ===
Source	Ranking
The Cook Political Report	Lean D (flip)
Inside Elections	Tilt D (flip)
Sabato's Crystal Ball	Lean D (flip)
Politico	Tossup
RCP	Tossup
CNN	Tossup
The Economist	Lean D (flip)
CBS News (Note: CBS News' presidential election ratings uniquely do not contain a category for Safe/Solid races.)	Tossup
270towin	Tossup
ABC News	Lean D (flip)
NPR (Note: NPR's presidential election ratings uniquely do not contain a category for Safe/Solid races.)	Tossup
NBC News	Tossup
538	Lean D (flip)

=== Polling ===
View source data.

Aggregate polls

Source of poll aggregation	Dates administered	Dates updated	Joe Biden Democratic	Donald Trump Republican	Other/ Undecided (Note: Calculated by taking the difference of 100% and all other candidates combined.)	Margin
270 to Win	October 22 – November 2, 2020	November 3, 2020	48.0%	45.8%	6.2%	Biden +2.2
Real Clear Politics	October 25 – November 1, 2020	November 3, 2020	47.9%	47.0%	5.1%	Biden +0.9
FiveThirtyEight	until November 2, 2020	November 3, 2020	48.7%	46.1%	5.2%	Biden +2.6
Average			48.2%	46.3%	5.5%	Biden +1.9

2020 polls

Poll source	Date(s) administered	Sample size (Note: Key: A – all adults RV – registered voters LV – likely voters V – unclear)	Margin of error	Donald Trump Republican	Joe Biden Democratic	Jo Jorgensen Libertarian	Howie Hawkins Green	Other	Undecided
Ipsos/Reuters	Oct 27 – Nov 2	610 (LV)	± 4.5%	47% (Note: Standard VI response)	50%	1%	0%	2% (Note: "Some other candidate" and West (B) with 1%; would not vote with 0%)	–
Ipsos/Reuters	Oct 27 – Nov 2	610 (LV)	± 4.5%	47% (Note: If only Biden, Trump and "some other candidate" were available)	49%	-	-	2% (Note: "Some other candidate" with 2%; would not vote with 0%)	1%
Ipsos/Reuters	Oct 27 – Nov 2	610 (LV)	± 4.5%	48% (Note: Results considering those who lean towards a given candidate among those initially predisposed towards abstention, indecision or a candidate besides Biden or Trump in the response section immediately above)	50%	-	-	2% (Note: "Some other candidate" with 2%)	–
SurveyMonkey/Axios	Oct 20 – Nov 2	4,278 (LV)	± 2.5%	46% (Note: Overlapping sample with the previous SurveyMonkey/Axios poll, but more information available regarding sample size)	52%	-	-	–	–
Change Research/CNBC	Oct 29 – Nov 1	409 (LV)	± 4.9%	47%	50%	2%	-	–	1%
Marist College/NBC	Oct 29 – Nov 1	717 (LV)	± 4.5%	48%	48%	-	-	3%	1%
Swayable	Oct 27 – Nov 1	360 (LV)	± 7.1%	46%	51%	4%	-	–	–
Data for Progress	Oct 27 – Nov 1	1,195 (LV)	± 2.8%	47%	50%	2%	1%	0% (Note: "Other candidate or write-in" with 0%)	–
AtlasIntel	Oct 30–31	641 (LV)	± 4%	50.4%	48.1%	-	-	1.5% (Note: "Other" with 1.5%)	–
Emerson College	Oct 29–31	732 (LV)	± 3.6%	46%	48%	-	-	6% (Note: "Someone else" with 6%)	–
Morning Consult	Oct 22–31	1,059 (LV)	± 3%	46%	48%	-	-	–	–
Data Orbital	Oct 28–30	550 (LV)	± 4.2%	45.3%	45.9%	3%	-	6% (Note: "Refused" with 5%; "Other" with 1%)	5%
Siena College/NYT Upshot	Oct 26–30	1,253 (LV)	± 3%	43%	49%	3%	-	1% (Note: "Someone else" with 1%; would not vote with 0%)	5% (Note: Includes "Refused")
Grand Canyon Battleground Poll	Oct 25–30	910 (LV)	± 3.1%	48%	45%	3%	-		4%
CNN/SSRS	Oct 23–30	892 (LV)	± 4.0%	46%	50%	3%	-	1% (Note: "None of these" with 1%; "Other" with no voters)	1%
Pulse Opinion Research/Rasmussen Reports	Oct 27–29	800 (LV)	± 3.5%	49%	45%	-	-	3% (Note: "Some other candidate" with 3%)	–
Redfield & Wilton Strategies	Oct 26–29	889 (LV)	–	46%	50%	2%	0%	1%	2%
Gravis Marketing	Oct 26–28	704 (LV)	± 3.7%	44%	48%	-	-	–	8%
Trafalgar Group	Oct 25–28	1,002 (LV)	± 3%	49%	46.5%	2.1%	-	1.7% (Note: "Someone else" with 1.7%)	0.7%
SurveyMonkey/Axios	Oct 1–28	5,687 (LV)	–	46%	52%	-	-	–	–
Ipsos/Reuters	Oct 21–27	714 (LV)	± 4.2%	47%	47%	2%	0%	3% (Note: "Some other candidate" with 2%; West (B) with 1%; would not vote with 0%)	–
Ipsos/Reuters	Oct 21–27	714 (LV)	± 4.2%	46%	48%	-	-	3% (Note: "Some other candidate" with 3%; would not vote with 0%)	2%
Swayable	Oct 23–26	304 (LV)	± 7.2%	44%	52%	3%	-	–	–
Justice Collaborative Project (Note: The Justice Collaborative Project is an affiliate of the Tides Centre, a liberal fiscal sponsorship provider)	Oct 22–25	874 (LV)	± 3.1%	43%	49%	-	-	–	5%
OH Predictive Insights	Oct 22–25	716 (LV)	± 3.7%	46%	49%	3%	-	1% (Note: "Refused" with 1%)	1%
Univision/University of Houston/Latino; Decisions/North Star Opinion Research	Oct 17–25	725 (RV)	± 3.6%	45%	50%	-	-	2% (Note: "Someone else" with 2%)	3%
Patinkin Research Strategies/Patinkin Research Strategies/Arizona Research Consortium (D)	Oct 21–24	729 (LV)	± 3.6%	45%	52%	-	-	2%	1%
Y2 Analytics/Salt Lake Tribune	Oct 15–24	700 (LV)	± 3.7%	47%	50%	-	-	–	–
Susquehanna Polling & Research Inc./Center for American Greatness (Note: The Center for American Greatness is a pro-Trump organization)	Oct 19–22	504 (LV)	± 4.4%	46% (Note: With voters who lean towards a given candidate)	46%	4%	-	2% (Note: "Other" with 1%; "Refused" with 0%)	1%
Ipsos/Reuters	Oct 14–21	658 (LV)	± 4.4%	46%	50%	1%	-	2% (Note: "Some other candidate" with 2%; West (B) and would not vote with 0%)	–
Ipsos/Reuters	Oct 14–21	658 (LV)	± 4.4%	46%	49%	-	-	3%	2%
Morning Consult	Oct 11–20	1,066 (LV)	± 3%	48%	47%	-	-	–	–
Pulse Opinion Research/Rasmussen Reports	Oct 18–19	800 (LV)	± 3.5%	46%	48%	-	-	3%	3%
Change Research/CNBC	Oct 16–19	232 (LV) (Note: Additional data sourced from FiveThirtyEight)	–	45%	51%	-	-	–	–
RMG Research/PoliticalIQ	Oct 14–19	800 (LV)	± 3.5%	46%	47%	-	-	3%	5%
RMG Research/PoliticalIQ	Oct 14–19	800 (LV)	± 3.5%	44% (Note: Results generated with high Democratic turnout model)	49%	-	-	3%	5%
RMG Research/PoliticalIQ	Oct 14–19	800 (LV)	± 3.5%	47% (Note: Results generated with high Republican turnout model)	45%	-	-	3%	5%
Data Orbital	Oct 16–18	550 (LV)	± 4.2%	42%	47%	3%	-	5% (Note: "Refused" with 4%; "Other" with 1%)	2%
YouGov/CBS	Oct 13–16	1,074 (LV)	± 4.1%	45%	49%	-	-	3% (Note: "Someone else/third party" with 3%)	3%
Ipsos/Reuters	Oct 7–14	667 (LV)	± 4.3%	47%	49%	1%	0%	2% (Note: "Some other candidate" and would not vote with 1%; West (B) with 0%)	–
Ipsos/Reuters	Oct 7–14	667 (LV)	± 4.3%	46%	50%	-	-	2%	3%
Monmouth University	Oct 11–13	502 (RV)	± 4.4%	44%	50%	2%	-	1% (Note: "Other candidate" with 1%; "No one" with no voters)	4%
Monmouth University	Oct 11–13	502 (LV)	± 4.4%	44% (Note: With a likely voter turnout model featuring high turnout)	51%	-	-	2%	–
Monmouth University	Oct 11–13	502 (LV)	± 4.4%	47% (Note: With a likely voter turnout model featuring low turnout)	49%	-	-	1%	–
Redfield & Wilton Strategies	Oct 10–13	750 (LV)	–	45%	48%	1%	0%	–	–
Morning Consult	Oct 2–11	1,144 (LV)	± 2.9%	46%	49%	-	-	–	–
Redfield & Wilton Strategies	Oct 9–10	720 (LV)	–	46%	48%	1%	0%	–	–
Trafalgar Group	Oct 6–8	1,087 (LV)	± 2.9%	48%	44%	2%	-	2%	5%
OH Predictive Insights	Oct 4–8	608 (LV)	± 4.0%	45%	49%	4%	-	0% (Note: "Refused" with 0%)	3%
OH Predictive Insights	Oct 4–8	608 (LV)	± 4.0%	47% (Note: If the only candidates were Biden and Trump)	50%	-	-	0%	3%
Redfield and Wilton Strategies	Oct 4–7	727 (LV)	± 3.6%	43%	49%	1%	1%	1% (Note: "Another Third Party/Write-in" with 1%)	6%
Ipsos/Reuters	Sep 29 – Oct 7	633 (LV)	± 4.3%	46%	48%	-	-	2%	4%
Latino Decisions/Democrats for Education Reform (Note: This poll's sponsor exclusively supports Democratic candidates)	Sep 28 – Oct 6	600 (LV)	± 4%	45%	48%	-	-	–	5%
Basswood Research/American Action Forum (Note: The American Action Forum is a 501 organization which usually supports Republican candidates)	Oct 3–5	800 (LV)	± 3.5%	48%	48%	2%	-	–	3%
Data Orbital	Oct 3–5	550 (LV)	± 4.2%	43%	48%	3%	-	3% (Note: "Refused" with 3%)	4%
HighGround Inc.	Sep 28 – Oct 5	400 (LV)	± 4.9%	45%	46%	-	-	4% (Note: "Some other candidate" with 3%; "Refused" with 2%)	5%
Change Research/CNBC	Oct 2–4	296 (LV)	–	45%	51%	-	-	–	–
Siena College/NYT Upshot	Oct 1–3	655 (LV)	± 4.2%	41%	49%	3%	–	1%	6%
Patinkin Research Strategies/Patinkin Research Strategies/Arizona Research Consortium (D)	Oct 1–3	604 (LV)	± 3.8%	46%	50%	-	-	3%	1%
Targoz Market Research/PollSmart	Sep 23 – Oct 2	1,045 (LV)	± 3.0%	46%	45%	-	-	10%	–
Suffolk University	Sep 26–30	500 (LV)	± 4.4%	46%	50%	1%	-	1%	2%
SurveyMonkey/Axios	Sep 1–30	7,100 (LV)	–	47%	51%	-	-	–	2%
Strategies 360/Smart and Safe Arizona (Note: Smart and Safe Arizona endorsed Proposition 207 prior to this poll's sampling period)	Sep 24–29	800 (LV)	± 3.5%	45%	49%	-	-	2% (Note: "Another candidate" with 2%)	4%
Susquehanna Polling & Research Inc/Center for American Greatness	Sep 25–28	500 (LV)	± 4.3%	47%	47%	-	-	–	–
Data for Progress (D)	Sep 23–28	808 (LV)	± 3.4%	45%	49%	1%	0%	–	4%
Data for Progress (D)	Sep 23–28	808 (LV)	± 3.4%	46%	50%	-	-	–	4%
Redfield & Wilton Strategies	Sep 23–26	871 (LV)	± 3.3%	44%	47%	1%	1%	1%	6%
Data For Progress (Note: Poll sponsored by the Defend Students Action Fund.)	Sep 15–22	481 (LV)	± 4.4%	46%	45%	-	-	–	10%
Change Research/CNBC	Sep 18–20	262 (LV)	–	43%	49%	-	-	–	–
ABC/The Washington Post	Sep 15–20	579 (LV)	± 4.5%	49%	48%	-	-	2% (Note: "Neither" with 2%; "other" with 0%; would not vote with no voters)	1%
Data Orbital	Sep 14–17	550 (LV)	–	47%	49%	-	-	–	–
Ipsos/Reuters	Sep 11–17	565 (LV)	± 4.7%	46%	47%	-	-	2%	5%
Redfield & Wilton Strategies	Sep 12–16	855 (LV)	± 3.4%	42%	47%	1%	0%	1%	8%
Monmouth University	Sep 11–15	420 (RV)	± 4.8%	44%	48%	4%	-	1% (Note: "No one" with 1%; "Other candidate" with 0%)	3%
Monmouth University	Sep 11–15	420 (LV)	± 4.8%	46% (Note: With a likely voter turnout model featuring higher turnout than in the 2016 presidential election)	48%	-	-	3%	3%
Monmouth University	Sep 11–15	420 (LV)	± 4.8%	47% (Note: With a likely voter turnout model featuring lower turnout than in the 2016 presidential election)	47%	-	-	3%	3%
Siena College/NYT Upshot	Sep 10–15	653 (LV)	± 4.1%	40%	49%	4%	-	1%	6%
Patinkin Research Strategies/Patinkin Research Strategies/Arizona Research Consortium (D)	Sep 10–13	679 (LV)	± 3.8%	46%	49%	-	-	4%	2%
Kaiser Family Foundation/Cook Political Report	Aug 29 – Sep 13	1,298 (RV)	± 3%	40%	45%	-	-	4% (Note: "Someone else" with 2%; would not vote with 1%; "Refused" with 0%)	11%
Gravis Marketing	Sep 10–11	684 (LV)	± 3.8%	48%	50%	-	-	–	2%
YouGov/CBS	Sep 9–11	1,106 (LV)	± 3.9%	44%	47%	-	-	3%	6%
OH Predictive Insights	Sep 8–10	600 (LV)	± 4%	42%	52%	-	-	–	5%
Benenson Strategy Group/GS Strategy Group/AARP	Aug 28 – Sep 8	1,600 (LV)	± 2.5%	47%	48%	-	-	1% (Note: Would not vote with 1%)	4%
Morning Consult	Aug 29 – Sep 7	901 (LV)	± (2–4%)	46% (Note: Overlapping sample with the previous Morning Consult poll, but more information available regarding sample size)	49%	-	-	–	–
Change Research/CNBC	Sep 4–6	470 (LV)	–	45%	49%	-	-	6% (Note: "Other/not sure" with 6%)	–
Redfield & Wilton Strategies	Aug 30 – Sep 4	830 (LV)	± 3.4%	43%	48%	0%	1%	0% (Note: West (B) and "Another Third Party/Write-in" with 0%)	6%
FOX News	Aug 29 – Sep 1	772 (LV)	± 3.5%	40%	49%	3%	-	1% (Note: "Other" with 1%)	6%
FOX News	Aug 29 – Sep 1	858 (RV)	± 3.0%	39%	49%	3%	-	3% (Note: "Other" with 2%; would not vote with 1%)	6%
Basswood Research/American Action Forum	Aug 29–31, 2020	800 (LV)	± 3.5%	48%	47%	1% (Note: Listed as Jacob Hornberger (L))	2%	–	2%
Basswood Research/American Action Forum	Aug 29–31, 2020	800 (LV)	± 3.5%	49%	48%	-	-	–	3%
SurveyMonkey/Axios	Aug 1–31	6,456 (LV)	–	52%	47%	-	-	–	2%
Morning Consult	Aug 21–30	943 (LV)	± 3.0%	42%	52%	-	-	–	–
Change Research/CNBC	Aug 21–23	344 (LV)	–	47%	49%	-	-	–	–
Redfield and Wilton Strategies	Aug 16–18	856 (LV)	± 3.4%	38%	47%	1%	1%	3% (Note: West (B) with 2%; "Another third party/write-in" with 1%)	10%
Morning Consult	Aug 7–16	947 (LV)	± (2–4%)	47%	45%	-	-	–	–
Emerson College	Aug 8–10	661 (LV)	± 3.8%	47%	53%	-	-	–	–
Change Research/CNBC	Aug 7–9	428 (LV)	–	44%	45%	-	-	–	–
Trafalgar Group	Aug 5–8	1,013 (LV)	± 2.9%	46%	45%	3%	-	1% (Note: "Another Party Candidate" with 1%)	4%
OH Predictive Insights	Aug 3–4	603 (LV)	± 4.0%	45%	49%	-	-	–	–
OnMessage Inc./Heritage Action (Note: Heritage Action is the sister organization of the Heritage Foundation, which exclusively endorses Republican candidates)	Aug 2–4	400 (LV)	± 4.9%	51%	48%	-	-	–	2%
Data for Progress	Jul 24 – Aug 2	1,215 (LV)	–	43%	45%	2%	1%	–	10%
Data for Progress	Jul 24 – Aug 2	1,215 (LV)	–	44%	47%	-	-	–	8%
SurveyMonkey/Axios	Jul 1–31	4,995 (LV)	–	51%	47%	-	-	–	2%
Change Research/CNBC	Jul 24–26	365 (LV)	–	45%	47%	-	-	–	–
Morning Consult	Jul 17–26	908 (LV)	± 3.3%	42%	49%	-	-	–	–
Morning Consult	Jul 16–25	– (LV) (Note: Not yet released)	–	43%	49%	-	-	–	–
CNN/SSRS	Jul 18–24	873 (RV)	± 3.8%	45%	49%	-	-	4% (Note: "Other" with 1%; "Neither" with 3%)	2%
Redfield & Wilton Strategies	Jul 19–23	858 (LV)	–	38%	46%	2%	1%	3%	11%
NBC News/Marist College	Jul 14–22	826 (RV)	± 4.1%	45%	50%	-	-	1%	3%
Public Policy Polling/AFSCME (Note: AFSCME endorsed Biden prior to this poll's sampling period)	Jul 17–18	960 (RV)	–	45%	49%	-	-	–	6%
Spry Strategies/American Principles Project (Note: This poll's sponsor is the American Principles Project, a 501(c)(4) organization that supports the Republican Party.)	Jul 11–16	700 (LV)	± 3.7%	45%	49%	-	-	–	6%
Morning Consult	Jul 6–15	– (LV)	–	45%	47%	-	-	–	–
Change Research/CNBC	Jul 10–12	345 (LV)	–	45%	51%	-	-	–	–
YouGov/CBS	Jul 7–10	1,087 (LV)	± 3.8%	46%	46%	-	-	4% (Note: "Someone else/third party" with 4%; would not vote with 0%)	4%
OH Predictive Insights	Jul 6–7	600 (LV)	± 4.0%	44%	49%	-	-	0%	7%
Morning Consult	Jun 26 – Jul 5	– (LV)	–	42%	48%	-	-	–	–
SurveyMonkey/Axios	Jun 8–30	2,365 (LV)	–	52%	46%	-	-	–	2%
Data Orbital	Jun 27–29	600 (LV)	± 4.0%	45%	47%	-	-	3.3% (Note: "Other" with 3.1%; "refused" with 0.2%)	4.2%
Morning Consult	Jun 16–25	– (LV)	–	43%	47%	-	-	–	–
Change Research/CNBC	Jun 26–28	311 (LV)	–	44%	51%	-	-	–	–
Gravis Marketing/OANN	Jun 27	527 (LV)	± 4.3%	49%	45%	-	-	–	7%
Redfield & Wilton Strategies	Jun 14–17	865 (LV)	± 3.3%	39%	43%	2%	1%	2% (Note: "other" with 2%)	13%
Siena College/NYT Upshot	Jun 8–16	650 (RV)	± 4.3%	41%	48%	-	-	4% (Note: "Another candidate" and would not vote with 2%)	8%
Civiqs/Daily Kos	Jun 13–15	1,368 (RV)	± 2.9%	45%	49%	-	-	5% (Note: "Someone else" with 5%)	1%
Morning Consult	Jun 6–15	– (LV)	–	44%	47%	-	-	–	–
Change Research/CNBC	Jun 12–14	201 (LV)	–	44%	45%	-	-	5% (Note: "Libertarian Party candidate/Green Party candidate" with 5%)	–
Morning Consult	May 27 – Jun 5	– (LV)	–	47%	45%	-	-	–	–
FOX News	May 30 – Jun 2	1,002 (RV)	± 3%	42%	46%	-	-	6% (Note: "Other" with 5%; would not vote with 1%)	5%
Change Research/CNBC	May 29–31	329 (LV)	–	45%	44%	-	-	9%	2%
Morning Consult	May 17–26	784 (LV)	–	47%	45%	-	-	–	–
Morning Consult	May 16–25	– (LV)	–	46%	46%	-	-	–	–
HighGround Inc.	May 18–22	400 (LV)	± 4.9%	45%	47%	-	-	4% (Note: "Some other candidate" with 4.3%)	4%
Redfield & Wilton Strategies	May 10–14	946 (LV)	± 3.2%	41%	45%	-	-	3% (Note: "Third party/write-in" with 3%)	10%
OH Predictive Insights	May 9–11	600 (LV)	± 4%	43%	50%	-	-	1%	6%
Morning Consult	May 6–15	– (LV)	–	47%	45%	-	-	–	–
GBAO Strategies/PLUS Paid Family Leave	Apr 13–16	500 (LV)	–	46%	47%	-	-	2%	5%
OH Predictive Insights	Apr 7–8	600 (LV)	± 4.0%	43%	52%	-	-	–	–
NBC News/The Wall Street Journal/Marist College	Mar 10–15	2,523 (RV)	± 2.7%	46%	47%	-	-	1%	5%
Monmouth University	Mar 11–14	847 (RV)	± 3.4%	43%	46%	-	-	2%	6%
Univision	Mar 6–11	1,036 (RV)	± 3.0%	42%	50%	-	-	–	8%
OH Predictive Insights	Mar 3–4	600 (LV)	± 4.0%	43%	49%	-	-	–	8%
Public Policy Polling	Mar 2–3	666 (V)	–	46%	47%	-	-	–	6%
Climate Nexus	Feb 11–15	539 (RV)	± 4.3%	46%	42%	-	-	–	13%
Fabrizio, Lee & Associates/Team McSally/Politico (Note: Poll sponsored by the McSally campaign)	Jan 22–24	1,000 (LV)	± 3.1%	50%	45%	-	-	–	6%
Public Policy Polling	Jan 2–4	760 (V)	–	46%	46%	-	-	–	8%

2019 polls

Poll source	Date(s) administered	Sample size	Margin of error	Donald Trump Republican	Joe Biden Democratic	Other	Undecided
OH Predictive Insights	Dec 3–4	628 (LV)	± 3.9%	46%	44%	0%	10%
Emerson College	Oct 25–28	901 (RV)	± 3.2%	50%	50%	–	–
Siena College/NYT Upshot	Oct 13–23	652 (LV)	± 4.4%	46%	49%	–	–
Bendixen & Amandi International	Sep 9–12	520 (RV)	± 4.3%	43%	42%	12%	3%
OH Predictive Insights	Aug 13–14	600 (LV)	± 4.0%	43%	45%	–	12%
Fabrizio Ward LLC	Jul 29–31	600 (LV)	± 4.0%	50%	45%	–	4%
OH Predictive Insights	May 1–2	600 (LV)	± 4.0%	44%	49%	–	7%
OH Predictive Insights	Feb 12–13	600 (LV)	± 4.0%	46%	46%	–	7%

Former candidates

Donald Trump vs. Michael Bloomberg

Poll source	Date(s) administered	Sample size	Margin of error	Donald Trump (R)	Michael Bloomberg (D)	Other	Undecided
Climate Nexus	Feb 11–15, 2020	539 (RV)	± 4.3%	44%	45%	–	11%
OH Predictive Insights	Dec 3–4, 2019	628 (LV)	± 3.9%	47%	40%	0%	10%

Donald Trump vs. Pete Buttigieg

Poll source	Date(s) administered	Sample size	Margin of error	Donald Trump (R)	Pete Buttigieg (D)	Other	Undecided
Climate Nexus	Feb 11–15, 2020	539 (RV)	± 4.3%	44%	44%	–	12%
Public Policy Polling	Jan 2–4, 2020	760 (V)	–	47%	44%	–	9%
OH Predictive Insights	Dec 3–4, 2019	628 (LV)	± 3.9%	45%	43%	0%	12%
OH Predictive Insights	Aug 13–14, 2019	600 (LV)	± 4.0%	43%	38%	–	18%
OH Predictive Insights	May 1–2, 2019	600 (LV)	± 4.0%	46%	37%	–	16%

Donald Trump vs. Kamala Harris

Poll source	Date(s) administered	Sample size	Margin of error	Donald Trump (R)	Kamala Harris (D)	Other	Undecided
Bendixen & Amandi International	Sep 9–12, 2019	520 (RV)	± 4.3%	42%	38%	17%	1%
OH Predictive Insights	Aug 13–14, 2019	600 (LV)	± 4.0%	45%	36%	–	18%
OH Predictive Insights	May 1–2, 2019	600 (LV)	± 4.0%	48%	39%	–	13%
OH Predictive Insights	Feb 12–13, 2019	600 (LV)	± 4.0%	49%	40%	–	11%

Donald Trump vs. Amy Klobuchar

Poll source	Date(s) administered	Sample size	Margin of error	Donald Trump (R)	Amy Klobuchar (D)	Undecided
Climate Nexus	Feb 11–15, 2020	539 (RV)	± 4.3%	46%	39%	15%

Donald Trump vs. Beto O'Rourke

Poll source	Date(s) administered	Sample size	Margin of error	Donald Trump (R)	Beto O'Rourke (D)	Undecided
OH Predictive Insights	May 1–2, 2019	600 (LV)	± 4.0%	46%	40%	14%

Donald Trump vs. Bernie Sanders

Poll source	Date(s) administered	Sample size	Margin of error	Donald Trump (R)	Bernie Sanders (D)	Other	Undecided
NBC News/The Wall Street Journal/Marist College	Mar 10–15, 2020	2,523 (RV)	± 2.7%	48%	45%	2%	6%
Monmouth University	Mar 11–14, 2020	847 (RV)	± 3.4%	44%	43%	4%	6%
Univision	Mar 6–11, 2020	1,036 (RV)	± 3.0%	43%	48%	–	10%
OH Predictive Insights	Mar 3–4, 2020	600 (LV)	± 4.0%	45%	38%	–	16%
Public Policy Polling	Mar 2–3, 2020	666 (V)	–	47%	46%	–	7%
Climate Nexus	Feb 11–15, 2020	539 (RV)	± 4.3%	46%	44%	–	10%
Public Policy Polling	Jan 2–4, 2020	760 (V)	–	47%	46%	–	7%
OH Predictive Insights	Dec 3–4, 2019	628 (LV)	± 3.9%	47%	34%	1%	18%
Emerson College	Oct 25–28, 2019	901 (RV)	± 3.2%	51%	49%	–	–
Siena College/NYT Upshot	Oct 13–23, 2019	652 (LV)	± 4.4%	49%	45%	–	–
Bendixen & Amandi International	Sep 9–12, 2019	520 (RV)	± 4.3%	45%	37%	15%	1%
OH Predictive Insights	Aug 13–14, 2019	600 (LV)	± 4.0%	44%	34%	–	22%
OH Predictive Insights	May 1–2, 2019	600 (LV)	± 4.0%	46%	37%	–	16%
OH Predictive Insights	Feb 12–13, 2019	600 (LV)	± 4.0%	49%	37%	–	13%

Donald Trump vs. Elizabeth Warren

Poll source	Date(s) administered	Sample size	Margin of error	Donald Trump (R)	Elizabeth Warren (D)	Other	Undecided
Climate Nexus	Feb 11–15, 2020	539 (RV)	± 4.3%	47%	40%	–	14%
Public Policy Polling	Jan 2–4, 2020	760 (V)	–	47%	45%	–	9%
OH Predictive Insights	Dec 3–4, 2019	628 (LV)	± 3.9%	47%	41%	1%	12%
Emerson College	Oct 25–28, 2019	901 (RV)	± 3.2%	50%	50%	–	–
Siena College/NYT Upshot	Oct 13–23, 2019	652 (LV)	± 4.4%	46%	47%	–	–
Bendixen & Amandi International	Sep 9–12, 2019	520 (RV)	± 4.3%	42%	42%	10%	3%
OH Predictive Insights	Aug 13–14, 2019	600 (LV)	± 4.0%	44%	43%	–	13%
OH Predictive Insights	May 1–2, 2019	600 (LV)	± 4.0%	47%	42%	–	11%
OH Predictive Insights	Feb 12–13, 2019	600 (LV)	± 4.0%	49%	38%	–	12%

Hypothetical polling

Donald Trump vs. Generic Democrat

Poll source	Date(s) administered	Sample size	Margin of error	Donald Trump (R)	Generic Democrat	Undecided
Univision	Mar 6–11, 2020	1,036 (RV)	± 3.0%	41%	51%	7%
Public Policy Polling (D) (Note: Poll sponsored by 314 Action)	Jan 24–25, 2019	682 (V)	± 3.8%	46%	50%	4%

=== Fundraising ===
According to the Federal Election Commission, in 2019 and 2020, Joe Biden and his interest groups raised $9,284,978.20, Donald Trump and his interest groups raised $15,506,263.10, and Jo Jorgensen raised $29,078.65 from Arizona-based contributors.

=== Candidate ballot access ===
- Joe Biden / Kamala Harris, Democratic
- Donald Trump / Mike Pence, Republican
- Jo Jorgensen / Jeremy "Spike" Cohen, Libertarian

Independent candidates who wished to run were required to submit a nomination petition and financial disclosure form between 120 and 90 days before the primary election. A valid nomination petition required signatures from 3% of unaffiliated registered voters in Arizona as of March 1, 2020. However, the signatories may be of any political party or unaffiliated as long as they have not already signed a petition for a candidate registered in a political party who intends to run in the same election. Petitions may be physical or electronic; in 2012, Arizona introduced E-Qual, an online nominating petition platform.

In-addition, write-in candidates were required to file a nomination paper (including the candidate's name and signature; residence and post office address; age and date of birth; and the length of time the candidate has lived in Arizona) and financial disclosure form by 5:00 p.m. on the 40th day before the election in which the candidate is running – in this case, September 24 – for their votes to be counted. Sore-loser laws prevent candidates who lost a primary election from running in the general election as a write-in candidate. Write-in candidates also may not run if they didn't receive enough signatures to attain ballot access while filing for the primary election or if the candidate did not receive enough signatures to gain ballot access in the general election. The following candidates were given write-in access:

- Howie Hawkins / Angela Nicole Walker, Green
- Jade Simmons / Claudeliah Roze, Independent
- Gloria La Riva / Sunil Freeman, Socialism and Liberation
- Daniel Clyde Cummings / Ryan Huber, Constitution
- President R. Boddie / Eric Stoneham, Independent

=== Electoral slates ===
Technically the voters of Arizona cast their ballots for electors, or representatives to the Electoral College, rather than directly for president and vice president. Arizona is allocated 11 electors because it has 9 congressional districts and 2 senators. All candidates who appear on the ballot or qualify to receive write-in votes must submit a list of 11 electors who pledge to vote for their candidate and their running mate. Whoever wins the most votes in the state is awarded all 11 electoral votes. Their chosen electors then vote for president and vice president. Although electors are pledged to their candidate and running mate, they are not obligated to vote for them. An elector who votes for someone other than their candidate is known as a faithless elector. In the state of Arizona, a faithless elector's vote is voided and replaced, but the faithless elector is not penalized.

The electors of each state and the District of Columbia met on December 15, 2020, to cast their votes for president and vice president. All 11 pledged electors cast their votes for President-elect former Vice President Joe Biden and Senator Kamala Harris from California. The Electoral College itself never meets as one body. Instead, the electors from each state and the District of Columbia met in their respective capitols. The electoral vote was tabulated and certified by Congress in a joint session on January 6, 2021 per the Electoral Count Act.

These individuals were nominated by each party to serve as the state's members of the 2020 Electoral College should their party's ticket win the state:

Joe Biden and Kamala Harris Democratic Party	Donald Trump and Mike Pence Republican Party	Jo Jorgensen and Spike Cohen Libertarian Party	Howie Hawkins and Angela Walker Green Party	Jade Simmons and Claudeliah J. Roze Independent	Gloria La Riva and Sunil Freeman Socialism and Liberation	Daniel Clyde Cummings and Ryan Huber Constitution Party	President R. Boddie and Eric Stoneham Independent
Steve Gallardo; Luis Alberto Heredia; Constance Jackson; Sandra D. Kennedy; Stephen Roe Lewis; James McLaughlin; Jonathan Nez; Ned Norris; Regina Romero; Felecia Rotellini; Fred Yamashita	Tyler Bowyer; Nancy Cottle; Jake Hoffman; Anthony T. Kern; James Lamon; Robert Montgomery; Samuel I. Moorhead; Loraine B. Pellegrino; Greg Safsten; Kelli Ward; Michael Ward	Timothy Benjamin; Howard Blitz; Jeffery T. Daniels; Alejandro Flores; Barry Hess; Michael Kielsky; Doug Marks; Robert A. Pepiton II; Brandon Slayton; Scott Steward; Jonathan Winder	Cara Bissell; Celeste M. Castorena; Cesario C. Castorena; Angela Dixon; Antonio Macías; Linda Macías; Betty J. McMurrin; Elisa Olea; Eduardo Quintana; Richard Scott; Angel Torres	Celeslie L. Boyer; Sydney Curtis; Maryann Ehmann; Valerie Grapentine; Jared Korth; JoAnna Langston; Erica Martin; Kia McMurray; Dennis McMurray Jr. Brittany Sanchez; Veronica Scheier	Jahaziel Felix; Pedro Gomez; Kealy Hartley; Alexia Isais; Dylan Jacobson; Steven Levin; Daniel Lopez; Joseph Mueller; Luzette Romo; Madison West; Skylar Wise	Jake Beeson; Jaymie Beeson; Becca Hansen; Jacob Hansen; Karen Huber; Ryan Huber; Deric Powell; Kristin Powell; Chad Prior; Diana Prior; Luis Ruiz	La Deysha Black; Donshadre Dukes; Travis Froman; Maria Guevara; Maria Elena Lechaga; Omar Leyva; Ema Maldonado; Rebecca Martinez; Lynette Tucci; Stephanie Valenzuela; Andrea Varela

=== Results ===
2020 United States presidential election in Arizona
Party	Candidate	Votes	%	±%
Democratic	Joe Biden Kamala Harris	1,672,143	49.36%	+4.82%
Republican	Donald Trump Mike Pence	1,661,686	49.06%	+0.98%
Libertarian	Jo Jorgensen Spike Cohen	51,465	1.52%	−2.56%
Green	Howie Hawkins (write-in) Angela Walker (write-in)	1,557	0.05%	−1.27%
Independent	Jade Simmons (write-in) Claudeliah Roze (write-in)	236	0.01%	N/A
Socialism and Liberation	Gloria La Riva (write-in) Sunil Freeman (write-in)	190	0.01%	N/A
Constitution	Daniel Clyde Cummings (Note: The Constitution Party did not have ballot access in Arizona. Daniel Clyde Cummings and Ryan Huber registered as write-in candidates representing the party instead of the national ticket led by Don Blankenship and William Mohr.) (write-in) Ryan Huber (write-in)	36	0.00%	−0.04%
Independent	President R. Boddie (write-in) Eric Stoneham (write-in)	13	0.00%	N/A
Total votes		3,387,326	100.00%	N/A

==== By county ====
County	Joe Biden Democratic		Donald Trump Republican		Various candidates Other parties		Margin		Total
County	#	%	#	%	#	%	#	%	Total
Apache	23,293	66.21%	11,442	32.52%	448	1.27%	11,851	33.68%	35,183
Cochise	23,732	39.24%	35,557	58.80%	1,184	1.96%	−11,825	−19.55%	60,473
Coconino	44,698	60.94%	27,052	36.88%	1,596	2.18%	17,646	24.06%	73,346
Gila	8,943	32.31%	18,377	66.40%	358	1.29%	−9,434	−34.08%	27,678
Graham	4,034	26.90%	10,749	71.68%	213	1.42%	−6,715	−44.78%	14,996
Greenlee	1,182	32.05%	2,433	65.97%	73	1.98%	−1,251	−33.92%	3,688
La Paz	2,236	29.97%	5,129	68.75%	95	1.27%	−2,893	−38.78%	7,460
Maricopa	1,040,774	50.29%	995,665	48.11%	33,036	1.60%	45,109	2.18%	2,069,475
Mohave	24,831	23.72%	78,535	75.01%	1,339	1.28%	−53,704	−51.29%	104,705
Navajo	23,383	45.16%	27,657	53.41%	743	1.43%	−4,274	−8.25%	51,783
Pima	304,981	58.57%	207,758	39.90%	7,996	1.54%	97,223	18.67%	520,735
Pinal	75,106	40.59%	107,077	57.87%	2,854	1.54%	−31,971	−17.28%	185,037
Santa Cruz	13,138	67.16%	6,194	31.67%	229	1.17%	6,944	35.50%	19,561
Yavapai	49,602	34.62%	91,527	63.88%	2,151	1.50%	−41,925	−29.26%	143,280
Yuma	32,210	46.06%	36,534	52.25%	1,182	1.69%	−4,324	−6.18%	69,926
Totals	1,672,143	49.36%	1,661,686	49.06%	53,497	1.58%	10,457	0.31%	3,387,326

County that flipped from Republican to Democratic

- Maricopa (largest municipality: Phoenix)

==== By congressional district ====
Biden won five out of nine congressional districts in Arizona.

District	Joe Biden Democratic	Donald Trump Republican	Representative
1st	50%	48%	Tom O'Halleran
2nd	55%	44%	Ann Kirkpatrick
3rd	63%	36%	Raúl Grijalva
4th	31%	68%	Paul Gosar
5th	42%	56%	Andy Biggs
6th	47%	51%	David Schweikert
7th	74%	25%	Ruben Gallego
8th	41%	57%	Debbie Lesko
9th	61%	37%	Greg Stanton

== Analysis ==
In winning Arizona, Biden won Maricopa County, by far the most populous county in Arizona, making it the first time a Democrat had done so since 1948. Biden's statewide winning margin of 0.3% remained out of range for a recount, since Arizona Revised Statutes does not have provisions for candidate- or voter-requested recounts. Furthermore, an automatic recount will only be performed if the margin is lower than 0.1%. This was the first time since 2000 that any county in the state flipped parties. Democrats carried a majority of congressional districts in the state for the first time since 1964. Arizona was seen as a potential Democratic flip throughout the year, as the state's increasing Hispanic population as well as an influx of retirees and younger college-educated voters were becoming increasingly friendly to the Democratic Party.

Analysts attributed Biden's win in Arizona to several factors, including shifts towards Democrats in the suburbs of Phoenix and an increase in Native American turnout. Trump's attacks on moderate Republicans, including former Arizona senator John McCain, were also cited as factors that helped Biden, along with Biden's endorsement from Cindy McCain, the widow of John McCain, and former Arizona Senator Jeff Flake. The Biden campaign had released an ad featuring Cindy McCain discussing Biden's relationship with John McCain. Analysts also cited Latino organizing after Arizona Republicans passed controversial immigration laws such as SB 1070.

=== Hispanic and Latino voters ===
Biden carried the Hispanic/Latino vote by a 59–40 margin, which was eleven points weaker than Hillary Clinton's 61–31 win in 2016 among Latinos, in spite of her loss statewide. Santa Cruz County, where 83.5% of the population is Hispanic or Latino, swung 12 points more Republican than in 2016, while Yuma County (63.8% Hispanic or Latino) swung 5.1 points more Republican.

=== Native American voters ===
Biden easily won Apache County, dominated by the Navajo and Fort Apache reservations; and Coconino County, encompassing the Havasupai Nation and parts of the Navajo, Hopi, and Hualapai nations. Anywhere from 60 to 90% of the Navajo Nation's 67,000 registered voters voted for Biden. In Pima County, Biden won the precincts encompassing the Tohono O'odham, San Xavier, and Pascua Yaqui reservations, often with over 90% of the vote.

=== Concurrent elections ===
The presidential election was held concurrently with elections to the House of Representatives and Senate. In the 2020 United States Senate special election, incumbent Republican Martha McSally, who lost the 2018 Senate election but was appointed to the Senate to replace Jon Kyl (who in turn replaced John McCain following his death), ran for re-election, but was defeated by Democrat and former astronaut Mark Kelly. Kelly was widely expected in polling and forecasts to outperform Biden due to McSally's unpopularity, and ended up doing so by 2.4 percentage points. It also corresponded with 2020 Arizona Proposition 207, a referendum to approve the legalization and taxation of recreational marijuana, which was approved by over 60% of voters. House Republicans won more votes than Democrats: Republicans won 50.1% of votes on the general ballot to the Democrats' 49.9%.

=== Exit polls ===
==== Edison ====
The following are estimates from exit polls conducted by the Edison Research for the National Election Pool (encompassing ABC News, CBS News, CNN, and NBC News) interviewing 1,639 Arizona voters, adjusted to match the actual vote count.

2020 presidential election in Arizona by subgroup (Edison exit polling)
Demographic subgroup	Biden	Trump	% of total vote
Total vote	49.36	49.06	99
Ideology
Liberals	93	6	22
Moderates	67	32	36
Conservatives	11	87	42
Party
Democrats	96	3	26
Republicans	9	90	35
Independents	53	44	39
Gender
Men	48	50	48
Women	51	48	52
Race/ethnicity
White	46	52	74
Black	–	–	2
Latino	61	37	19
Asian	–	–	2
Other	–	–	4
Age
18–29 years old	63	32	16
30–44 years old	47	51	20
45–64 years old	44	55	32
65 and older	49	50	31
Sexual orientation
LGBT	68	29	8
Heterosexual	48	51	92
Education
Never attended college	49	51	16
Some college education	46	51	28
Associate degree	46	52	14
Bachelor's degree	49	50	25
Postgraduate degree	60	40	16
Issue regarded as most important
Racial inequality	93	6	12
Coronavirus	95	4	21
Economy	8	91	34
Crime and safety	11	87	12
Health care	78	20	14
Region
Maricopa County	50	48	61
Pima County	59	40	15
Rest of state	41	57	24
Area type
Urban	56	42	46
Suburban	45	55	46
Rural	41	55	9
Family's financial situation today
Better than four years ago	15	83	44
Worse than four years ago	91	8	15
About the same	71	27	41

==== Associated Press ====
The following are estimates from exit polls conducted by the University of Chicago for the Associated Press interviewing 3,772 likely voters in Arizona, adjusted to match the actual vote count.

2020 presidential election in Arizona by subgroup (Associated Press exit polling)
Demographic subgroup	Biden	Trump	Jorgensen	% of total vote
Total vote	49.36	49.06	1.52	100
Ideology
Liberals	92	8	<1	28
Moderates	59	37	3	33
Conservatives	10	89	1	39
Party
Democrats or lean Democrat	96	3	1	43
Republicans or lean Republican	9	90	1	51
Independents	58	33	8	6
Type of vote
Election Day	33	66	1	15
Early in-person	38	61	1	20
Mail	56	42	2	66
Vote in 2016
Hillary Clinton	95	5	<1	36
Donald Trump	7	92	1	43
Someone else	58	27	14	6
Did not vote	57	41	1	15
Gender
Men	46	52	2	48
Women	52	47	1	52
Race/ethnicity
White	45	53	2	71
Black	–	–	–	4
Latino	59	40	1	18
Other	49	49	2	8
Age
18–24 years old	63	33	4	7
25–29 years old	55	43	2	6
30–39 years old	56	43	1	14
40–49 years old	49	48	2	14
50–64 years old	45	54	1	29
65 and older	46	53	1	30
Religion
Protestant	35	64	1	21
Catholic	51	48	1	22
Mormon	18	80	2	4
Other Christian	33	66	1	17
Jewish	68	30	2	3
Muslim	–	–	–	1
Something else	58	38	3	7
None	71	27	2	26
Marital status
Single or never married	59	40	1	21
Married	43	55	2	58
Separated	–	–	–	<1
Divorced	50	49	1	15
Widowed	–	–	–	6
Sexual orientation
LGBT	70	27	2	8
Heterosexual	45	53	1	92
Education
High school or less	49	50	1	24
Some college education or associate degree	47	51	2	41
College graduate	52	46	1	23
Postgraduate degree	54	45	1	13
Total household income (2019)
Under $25,000	50	48	2	13
$25,000–$49,999	52	46	1	25
$50,000–$74,999	54	45	1	21
$75,000–$99,999	47	52	1	17
Over $100,000	44	53	2	24
Union households
Yes	52	46	1	10
No	49	50	1	90
Veteran households
Veteran, self	48	51	1	14
Veteran household	46	54	<1	19
No	53	45	2	67
Issue regarded as most important
Economy and jobs	14	84	2	31
Healthcare	64	34	2	8
Immigration	13	85	2	5
Abortion	–	–	–	2
Law enforcement	17	82	1	5
Climate change	86	10	3	5
Foreign policy	–	–	–	1
COVID-19 pandemic	76	23	1	39
Racism	85	15	<1	5
Area type
Urban	59	40	1	26
Suburban	48	51	1	50
Small town	41	58	1	13
Rural	43	55	2	10
Family's financial situation today
Getting ahead	23	77	<1	13
Holding steady	50	47	2	70
Falling behind	64	33	2	17

== Aftermath ==
=== Controversies ===
==== Early call ====
Fox News called Arizona for Biden at 11:20 p.m. EST on November 3, election day, with 73% of projected vote counted. The Associated Press did so at 2:51 a.m. EST on November 4. Fox News received push-back from the Trump campaign as no other network called Arizona on election night. Fox News decision desk director Arnon Mishkin defended the Arizona call at 12:30 a.m., saying that Fox News was "four standard deviations from being wrong" and that Trump was "not going to be able to take over and win enough votes to eliminate that seven-point lead that [Biden] has". Biden and other Democratic candidates began election night with a wide lead in the state, and at the time Fox News called Arizona for Biden, he led by 210,259 votes (53.9% to 44.9%). The reporting in Arizona was the reverse of a 'red mirage' and 'blue shift' effect seen nationwide, where the counting of election day votes before early and absentee votes gave Republicans across the country an early lead. Votes cast on election day typically leaned heavily Republican while those cast early and absentee ballots leaned heavily Democratic, partially due to the skepticism of mail-in voting spread mostly by Trump and fellow Republicans. However, Arizona and several other Sun Belt states had the opposite effect. Early votes and absentee votes cast before the election were pre-counted and released shortly after 10:00 p.m. EST, when polls closed. Election day votes, as well as a few absentee votes, were released on election night and trickled in throughout the rest of the week. FiveThirtyEight correctly predicted that close races "might have to wait for those last few ballots before knowing who won". Despite Biden's lead dropping throughout the week, it became clear that Trump's margin among election day votes would not be enough to overtake Biden's lead: Trump needed 59% of the outstanding vote to win, but continuously won around only 53% of the votes released in several ballot dumps after election day.

On November 11, Decision Desk HQ, along with several other outlets, projected that Biden would carry the state. On November 12, ABC News, NBC News, CNN and The New York Times all projected Biden to carry the state shortly after 11:00 p.m. Eastern.

On November 24, 2020, Governor Doug Ducey acknowledged that Biden won the state.

==== Objection ====
On January 6, as a joint session of Congress began to certify the election for President-elect Joe Biden and Vice President-elect Kamala Harris, there was an objection to Arizona's 11 electoral votes, brought forward by Representative Paul Gosar of Arizona's 4th congressional district and Senator Ted Cruz of Texas, and signed by 67 other senators and representatives. Debates began over the objection in the U.S. Senate and House of Representatives, but were abruptly cut short after threats by pro-Trump demonstrators that escalated into a fullblown storming of the Capitol, forcing the building to be locked down and Congress to be evacuated. After the Capitol was secured at 5:40 p.m. and Congress reconvened, the objection failed 6–93 in the Senate, and 121–303 in the House. The riot reportedly dissuaded several Republican senators and representatives from objecting to the Electoral College results.

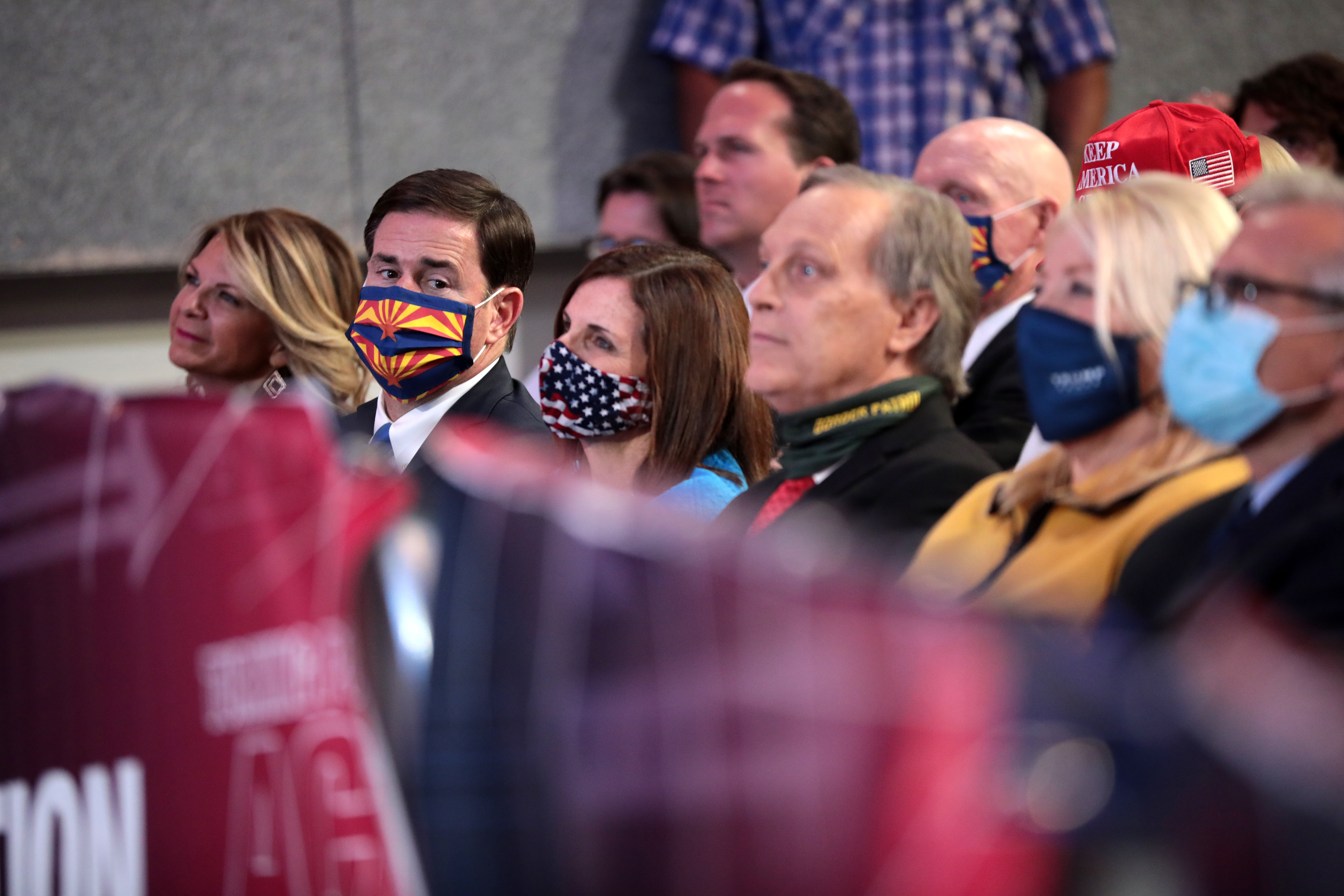
Kelli Ward (left), future Chair of the Arizona GOP, would ultimately vote to censure Doug Ducey (second from left) for his refusal to overturn the Arizona election results.

On January 24, 2021, the Arizona GOP voted to censure Cindy McCain, Jeff Flake, and Doug Ducey, all of whom vehemently denied conspiracy theories from the Trump campaign arguing that the results in Arizona were fraudulent and invalid. Between January 6 and January 20, the Arizona Secretary of State office reported that over 8,000 Republicans changed their party registration to Democrat, Libertarian, or unaffiliated, which was attributed to said actions by Trump and the Arizona GOP.

=== Lawsuits ===
Following the election, Donald Trump, the Arizona Republican Party, Republican National Committee, and several others filed lawsuits attempting to overturn the results of the election in Arizona, citing unsubstantiated claims of voter fraud.

==== Overvotes lawsuit ====
On November 7, 2020, the Trump campaign, the Republican National Committee, and the Arizona Republican Party filed a lawsuit against Secretary of State Katie Hobbs and Maricopa County Recorder Adrian Fontes that alleged that overvotes were "incorrectly rejected". Overvotes occur when a voter marks more than the options allowed in a given race, and stray markings can often be processed as overvotes by tabulation machines. The machines are programmed to alert voters of the overvote, allowing them to either request a new ballot or proceed with the original one. The lawsuit argued that those who chose to file their "original ballots are entitled to a manual inspection of their ballots later," and claimed that voters were urged to cast their original ballots by poll workers rather than request a new one. In total, 4,816 votes were deemed overvotes, which would be insufficient to overcome Biden's 10,457-vote advantage. A representative for Maricopa County stated that only "180 potential overvotes" were involved in the lawsuit, and that it would be "absurd" to assume all 180 were incorrectly counted. The Trump campaign requested that their evidence be kept secret from the public, but the judge refused to allow the secrecy. The Trump campaign also stated that they had video footage from within a polling area; however, such footage would be illegal if taken within 75 feet of a polling area with voters present. Thomas Liddy, a lawyer representing Maricopa County, deemed the lawsuit unnecessary, as if their claims were correct, both Biden and Trump votes would be equally affected, while Roopali Desai, an attorney representing the Secretary of State, argued the lawsuit attempted to "find a problem when one does not exist".

Mick West, a skeptical investigator and creator of the website Metabunk, cited how the percentage of votes deemed overvotes was lower or the same percentage as the last four elections, and a considerable decrease from 2016, when 21,785 overvotes (1.4%) were cast in the presidential election in Maricopa County.

On November 10, 2020, Associate Presiding Civil Judge Daniel Kiley accepted a request from Snell & Wilmer, the law firm which was representing the Trump campaign and its allies, to withdraw from the Arizona lawsuit. On November 11, 2020, Arizona Attorney General Mark Brnovich rejected Trump's voter fraud claim during an interview with Fox Business and stated that Biden would win the state of Arizona. On November 13, the Trump campaign dropped their lawsuit after it became evident that the number of votes potentially to be contested would not overcome Biden's margin of victory in the state.

=== Audits and recounts by election officials ===
By November 7, hand-count audits had been completed in Cochrise, Coconino, Grenlee, Maricopa, Mohave, Navajo, Pima, Pinal, Santa Cruz, and Yavapai counties in order to test the accuracy of the voting-tabulation equipment. Each of these county hand-count audits either found there to be no discrepancies, or found their count to be within the acceptable margins of error identified by state election law.

Maricopa County's November 4 hand-count audit had found no discrepancies. From November 7 through November 9, 2020, an additional 47,000 ballots (2% of election-day ballots plus 5,000 early voting ballots) were hand-recounted by teams appointed by the county's three local political parties and again found no discrepancies.

On February 23, 2021, the Republican Chairman of Maricopa County's Board of Supervisors announced that forensic audits of their vote tabulation equipment by two independent auditors, who were certified by the U.S. Election Assistance Commission, found no irregularities.

=== Audit ordered by Arizona Senate Republicans ===
==== Origins ====
On March 31, 2021, the Arizona Senate Republican caucus hired four firms to examine the ballots in Maricopa County in the races for President and for the United States Senate, with a Florida-based company called Cyber Ninjas being the lead firm. Cyber Ninjas' owner, Doug Logan, is a Trump supporter and a proponent of Trump's false claims of voter fraud. The process involves an audit to search for evidence of fraud, and a hand recount of the 2.1 million ballots cast in Maricopa County. The hand recount is managed by Wake Technology Services, which reportedly had been hired for a previous audit in a rural Pennsylvania county by Trump attorney Sidney Powell, who has promoted numerous conspiracy theories about the election; the firm works primarily in the healthcare sector with little to no experience with elections.

The Arizona Republicans funded the effort by using $150,000 from the State Senate operating budget, but this money is acknowledged to be insufficient and the actual source of funding has not been declared. Patrick Byrne, the former CEO of Overstock.com and promoter of 2020 election conspiracy theories, donated one million dollars to the effort and created a website to raise further funds, which was promoted by former Trump national security advisor Michael Flynn. The fundraising was conducted through a 501(c)(4) organization, a tax code provision intended primarily for the promotion of social welfare. One America News personalities also created a dark money organization to raise funds, while providing extensive coverage of the audit that drew praise from Trump. CueCat inventor J. Hutton Pulitzer claims to have invented a system for detecting "kinematic markers" which is being used by Cyber Ninjas. Pulitzer is also said to be the originator of the claim that Chinese ballots with paper containing bamboo are part of the claimed fraud. Flynn and Byrne stated that, if they were proven wrong, they would publicly apologize that they "put this country through this."

==== Conduct and concerns ====
The audit began on April 22, and on the same day Arizona Senate Democrats filed a lawsuit to stop the audit. The next day Judge Christopher Coury agreed to suspend the audit for three days until the contractors can present documentation on how they will conduct the audit. The suspension was conditioned on the Arizona Senate Democrats posting a $1 million bond to cover the cost that the delay could cost the Arizona State Senate Republicans. But because the Arizona State Senate Democrats refused to post the bond, the suspension did not go into effect. By May 5 Arizona Senate Democrats reached a settlement with the Arizona Senate Republicans to allow independent elections experts to observe the audit. The agreement authorizes Secretary of State Katie Hobbs to file suit against Cyber Ninjas for breach of contract if the company does not live up to the agreement.

Former Arizona Secretary of State Ken Bennett, a Republican, had been designated as the State Senate's liaison to the audit. On May 5, 2021, Hobbs sent a letter to Bennett, detailing additional concerns with the way the audit was being conducted. Her letter cited the audit's disclosed procedures (departures from best practices for hand recounts) and the reports of the observers sent from the Secretary of State's office (including sloppy handling of ballots). A response from the audit's Twitter account asserted that Hobbs's allegations were "baseless claimes [sic]".

Also on May 5, the United States Department of Justice sent Karen Fann, president of the Arizona State Senate, a letter expressing concerns that the audit may violate federal laws. One concern is that the law requires election officials to maintain custody of all voting records for up to 22 months. Another concern is that the statement of work for Cyber Ninjas authorizes Cyber Ninjas to knock on voters' doors to ask them if they have voted in the 2020 elections, which may amount to voter intimidation and constitute a violation of the Voting Rights Act of 1965. After the Department of Justice threatened to sue over this plan, Cyber Ninjas agreed not to do it.

As part of the audit, auditors have been looking for secret watermarks, machine-markings, and bamboo fibers within the ballots. The testing for bamboo fibers was intended to prove a conspiracy theory that counterfeit ballots were shipped from South Korea after the elections. The audit was supposed to have concluded on May 14, but as of May 9, only 12% of the ballots were counted. The audit is being conducted at the main floor of the Arizona Veterans Memorial Coliseum, which was not available for this activity beyond the original target date. Consequently, the audit went on hiatus on May 14 and resumed on May 24.

The objectivity of the audit has been called into question due to the involvement of Logan. Additionally, Anthony Kern, a former Republican state lawmaker who was present at the 2021 storming of the United States Capitol, has been seen tallying votes. Kern, who was himself named on the ballots as a would-be Trump presidential elector as well as running for re-election to the Arizona House of Representatives, has since been removed from the group with access to the ballots. Former Arizona Secretary of State Ken Bennett, a Republican, is advising the audit. Hobbs, the current Secretary of State, has criticized Bennett's efforts, saying he needs to "either do it right, or don't do it at all."

The audit has produced division among Arizona Republicans. After initially supporting the audit, on May 9 Paul Boyer, a member of the Arizona State Senate Republican caucus, criticized the audit, saying "it makes us look like idiots." The Maricopa County Board of Supervisors, which is dominated by Republicans, also opposed the audit. On May 17, the board held a hearing and sent Fann a twelve-page letter to dispute her allegations of wrongdoing by county officials. Republican board chairman Jack Sellers stated that the allegations were actually due to the incompetence of the auditors and accused Fann of an "attempt at legitimatizing a grift disguised as an audit." Fann, however, continued to support the audit, and sent the Board of Supervisors a four-page letter stating that "serious issues" had arisen during the audit. Arizona Republican Party Chairwoman Kelli Ward released multiple videos about the audit, in which she criticized the Board of Supervisors and raised "the possibility of placing the validity of the entire 2020 election into question." A poll conducted at the end of March found that 78.3% of Arizona Republicans believed "that there was significant voter fraud in the 2020 United States Presidential Election which compromised the integrity of the election."

Fann made an allegation, later amplified by Trump in a May 15 post on his blog, asserting that Maricopa County election officials deleted the voting database after the election. Maricopa County Recorder Stephen Richer, a Republican who oversees elections, tweeted that Trump's post was "unhinged", noting he was looking at the database on his computer at that moment. Richer added, "We can't indulge these insane lies any longer." The auditors later acknowledged the database had not been deleted.

The Arizona Republic reported in May that because Senate Republicans had given private companies and individuals unfettered and unmonitored access to voting machines, the county might need to expend significant funds and time to ensure the equipment would meet federal, state and local requirements for certifying and protecting election equipment. The Republic reported the voting machines were worth $6 million. Hobbs, the Secretary of State, later informed the Board of Supervisors that election technology and security experts, including at the federal Cybersecurity and Infrastructure Security Agency, unanimously advised her that the machines should not be reused in future elections because no methods exist to adequately secure them.

A preliminary report on the results of the audit, made at the cost of some six million dollars raised from Trump supporters determined to overturn the election, found no evidence of fraud. Despite that, Trump continued to claim that there had been fraud in the tabulation of results and confirmation of the Biden win. The audit claimed to have found minor discrepancies in the original, state-certified count, that had actually widened Biden's margin by 360 votes.

== See also ==
- 2020 Arizona elections
- 2020 United States presidential election
- 2020 Democratic Party presidential primaries
- 2020 Republican Party presidential primaries
- 2020 United States elections

== Notes ==
Partisan clients

Voter samples and additional candidates
