= 1932 United States Senate elections =

- November 8, 1932
- Class 3

34 of the 96 seats in the United States Senate 49 seats needed for a majority
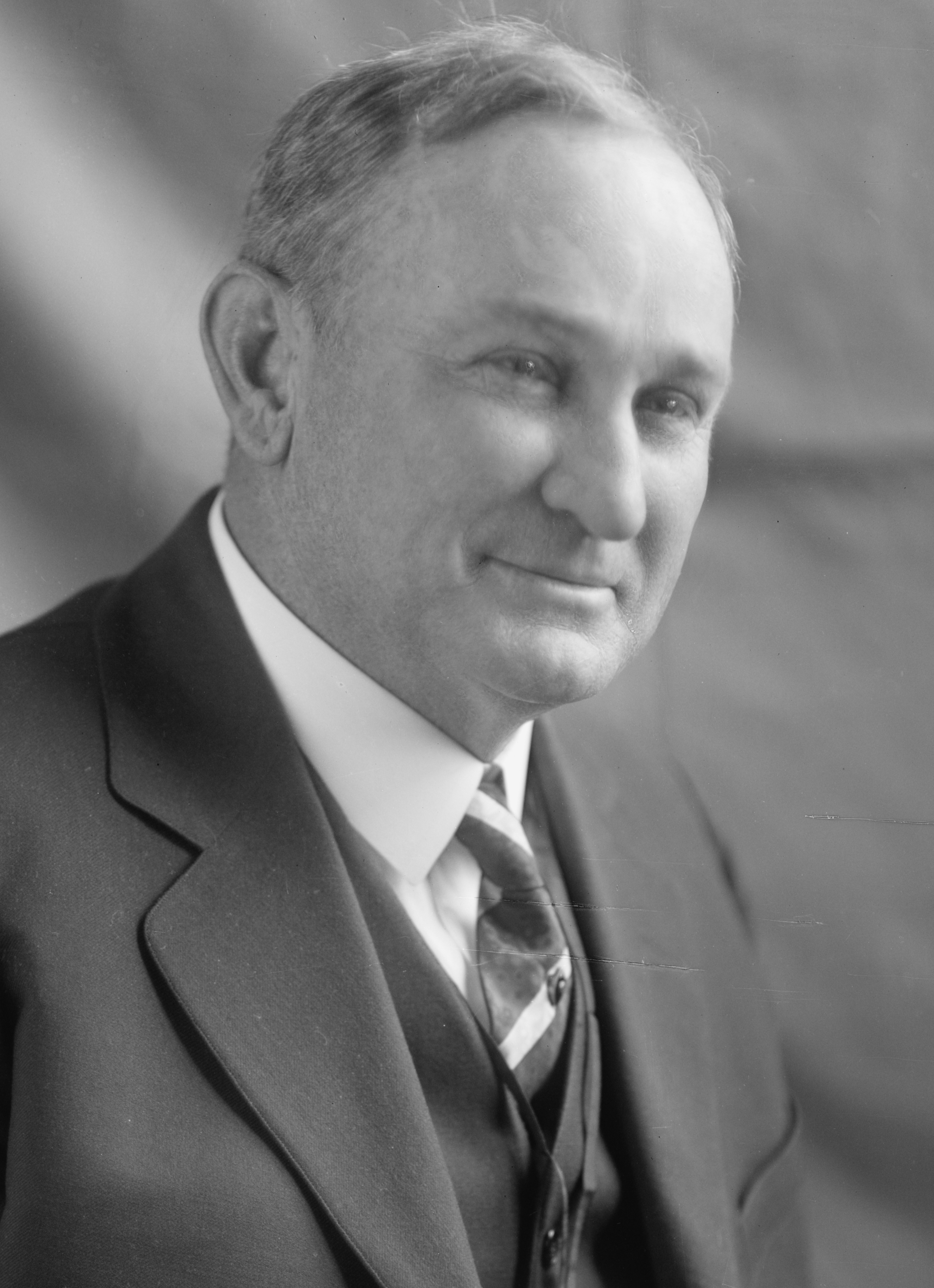

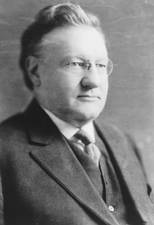
	Majority party	Minority party
Leader	Joseph Robinson	James Watson (lost re-election)
Party	Democratic	Republican
Leader since	December 3, 1923	March 4, 1929
Leader's seat	Arkansas	Indiana
Seats before	47 (Note: The Democrats technically had 48 seats on election day, as Colorado's Democratic Governor Billy Adams had appointed Democrat Walter Walker at the end of September. But the Senate was not in session at any time before election day and therefore also not reorganized. Subsequently, the Republicans won the special election for the remainder of the term in the 72nd Congress.)	48
Seats after	59	36
Seat change	▲12	▼12
Seats up	17	17
Races won	28	6
	Third party
Party	Farmer–Labor
Seats before	1
Seats after	1
Seat change	Steady
Seats up	0
Races won	0
- Results of the elections: Democratic gain Democratic hold Republican hold No election
Majority Leader before election
James Watson
Republican
Elected Majority Leader
Joseph Robinson
Democratic

The 1932 United States Senate elections coincided with the Democrat Franklin D. Roosevelt's landslide victory over the incumbent Herbert Hoover in the presidential election. The 32 seats of Class 3 were contested in regular elections, and special elections were held to fill vacancies.

== Events of the election ==
With the Hoover administration widely blamed for the Great Depression, Republicans lost twelve seats and control of the chamber to the Democrats, who won 28 of the 34 contested races (two Democratic incumbents, Duncan U. Fletcher of Florida and John H. Overton of Louisiana, were re-elected unopposed). Democrats gained another seat through an appointment in Nebraska, bringing their total number of seats up to 60.

The Democratic gains translated to the largest net gain of seats by a single party in a Senate election at the time, measured against the results of the previous election. To date, this figure has been surpassed only by Republican gains in the 1946 elections and Democratic gains in the 1958 elections. It remains the largest net gain for a Senate election coinciding with a presidential election, tied with Republican gains in the 1980 elections.

Among the Republican incumbents defeated in 1932 were Senate Majority Leader James Watson and five-term Senator Reed Smoot, an author of the controversial Smoot-Hawley tariff. This was the first of four elections in which a Senate leader lost re-election, and the only time they were a Republican. This election marked the first time a woman was elected to the Senate, that being Hattie Caraway of Arkansas. This was the last time Democrats won a Senate election in Kansas until 2026, when Adam Hamilton defeated incumbent Republican Roger Marshall.

This is also one of only five occasions where 10 or more Senate seats changed hands in an election, with the other occasions being in 1920, 1946, 1958, and 1980.

== Gains, losses, and holds ==
=== Retirements ===
Three Democrats retired instead of seeking re-election.

State	Senator	Replaced by
Colorado	Walter Walker	Alva B. Adams
Georgia (special)	John S. Cohen	Richard Russell Jr.
Missouri	Harry B. Hawes	Bennett Champ Clark

=== Defeats ===
Eleven Republicans and three Democrats sought re-election but lost in the primary or general election.

State	Senator	Replaced by
California	Samuel M. Shortridge	William Gibbs McAdoo
Colorado (special)	Walter Walker	Karl C. Schuyler
Connecticut	Hiram Bingham III	Augustine Lonergan
Idaho	John Thomas	James P. Pope
Illinois	Otis F. Glenn	William H. Dieterich
Indiana	James E. Watson	Frederick Van Nuys
Iowa	Smith W. Brookhart	Louis Murphy
Louisiana	Edwin S. Broussard	John H. Overton
Nevada	Tasker Oddie	Pat McCarran
New Hampshire	George H. Moses	Fred H. Brown
North Carolina	Cameron A. Morrison	Robert R. Reynolds
Utah	Reed Smoot	Elbert D. Thomas
Washington	Wesley L. Jones	Homer Bone
Wisconsin	John J. Blaine	F. Ryan Duffy

=== Post-election changes ===
State	Senator	Replaced by
Montana	Thomas J. Walsh	John E. Erickson
New Mexico	Sam G. Bratton	Carl Hatch
Vermont	Porter H. Dale	Ernest W. Gibson
Virginia	Claude A. Swanson	Harry F. Byrd
Nebraska	Robert B. Howell	William H. Thompson
Wyoming	John B. Kendrick	Joseph C. O'Mahoney

== Change in composition ==
=== After the January special election ===
		D_{1}	D_{2}	D_{3}	D_{4}	D_{5}	D_{6}	D_{7}	D_{8}
D_{18}	D_{17}	D_{16}	D_{15}	D_{14}	D_{13}	D_{12}	D_{11}	D_{10}	D_{9}
D_{19}	D_{20}	D_{21}	D_{22}	D_{23}	D_{24}	D_{25}	D_{26}	D_{27}	D_{28}
D_{38}	D_{37}	D_{36}	D_{35}	D_{34}	D_{33}	D_{32}	D_{31}	D_{30}	D_{29}
D_{39}	D_{40}	D_{41}	D_{42}	D_{43}	D_{44}	D_{45}	D_{46}	D_{47} Ark. (sp); Elected (Note: Appointee elected)	FL_{1}
Plurality →									R_{48}
R_{39}	R_{40}	R_{41}	R_{42}	R_{43}	R_{44}	R_{45}	R_{46}	R_{47}	R_{48}
R_{38}	R_{37}	R_{36}	R_{35}	R_{34}	R_{33}	R_{32}	R_{31}	R_{30}	R_{29}
R_{19}	R_{20}	R_{21}	R_{22}	R_{23}	R_{24}	R_{25}	R_{26}	R_{27}	R_{28}
R_{18}	R_{17}	R_{16}	R_{15}	R_{14}	R_{13}	R_{12}	R_{11}	R_{10}	R_{9}
		R_{1}	R_{2}	R_{3}	R_{4}	R_{5}	R_{6}	R_{7}	R_{8}

=== Before the November elections ===
		D_{1}	D_{2}	D_{3}	D_{4}	D_{5}	D_{6}	D_{7}	D_{8}
D_{18}	D_{17}	D_{16}	D_{15}	D_{14}	D_{13}	D_{12}	D_{11}	D_{10}	D_{9}
D_{19}	D_{20}	D_{21}	D_{22}	D_{23}	D_{24}	D_{25}	D_{26}	D_{27}	D_{28}
D_{38} Ga. (sp); Retired	D_{37} Ga. (reg); Ran	D_{36} Fla. Ran	D_{35} Colo. (reg); Retired Colo. (sp); Ran	D_{34} Ark. (reg); Ran	D_{33} Ariz. Ran	D_{32} Ala. Ran	D_{31}	D_{30}	D_{29}
D_{39} Kan. Ran	D_{40} Ky. Ran	D_{41} La. Ran	D_{42} Md. Ran	D_{43} Mo. Retired	D_{44} N.Y. Ran	D_{45} N.C. (reg); N.C. (sp); Ran	D_{46} Ohio; Ran	D_{47} Okla. Ran	D_{48} S.C. Ran
Plurality →									D_{48} S.C. Ran
Plurality →									FL_{1}
R_{39} N.J. (sp); Ran	R_{40} N.D. Ran	R_{41} Ore. Ran	R_{42} Pa. Ran	R_{43} S.D. Ran	R_{44} Utah; Ran	R_{45} Vt. Ran	R_{46} Wash. Ran	R_{47} Wisc. Ran	FL_{1}
R_{38} N.H. Ran	R_{37} Nev. Ran	R_{36} Iowa; Ran	R_{35} Ind. Ran	R_{34} Ill. Ran	R_{33} Idaho; Ran	R_{32} Conn. Ran	R_{31} Calif. Ran	R_{30}	R_{29}
R_{19}	R_{20}	R_{21}	R_{22}	R_{23}	R_{24}	R_{25}	R_{26}	R_{27}	R_{28}
R_{18}	R_{17}	R_{16}	R_{15}	R_{14}	R_{13}	R_{12}	R_{11}	R_{10}	R_{9}
		R_{1}	R_{2}	R_{3}	R_{4}	R_{5}	R_{6}	R_{7}	R_{8}

=== Result of the November elections ===
		D_{1}	D_{2}	D_{3}	D_{4}	D_{5}	D_{6}	D_{7}	D_{8}
D_{18}	D_{17}	D_{16}	D_{15}	D_{14}	D_{13}	D_{12}	D_{11}	D_{10}	D_{9}
D_{19}	D_{20}	D_{21}	D_{22}	D_{23}	D_{24}	D_{25}	D_{26}	D_{27}	D_{28}
D_{38} Kan. Re-elected	D_{37} Ga. (sp); Hold	D_{36} Ga. (reg); Re-elected	D_{35} Fla. Re-elected	D_{34} Colo. (reg); Hold (Note: Karl C. Schuyler (R) won the special election for the term ending in March 1933, but Alva B. Adams (D) won the general for the term beginning thereafter.) Colo. (sp); Gain (Note: Appointee defeated)	D_{33} Ark. (reg); Re-elected	D_{32} Ariz. Re-elected	D_{31} Ala. Re-elected	D_{30}	D_{29}
D_{39} Ky. Re-elected	D_{40} La. Hold	D_{41} Md. Re-elected	D_{42} Mo. Hold	D_{43} N.Y. Re-elected	D_{44} N.C. (reg); N.C. (sp); Hold	D_{45} Ohio; Re-elected	D_{46} Okla. Re-elected	D_{47} S.C. Re-elected	D_{48} Calif. Gain
Majority →									D_{49} Conn. Gain
D_{58} Wisc. Gain	D_{57} Wash. Gain	D_{56} Utah; Gain	D_{55} N.H. Gain	D_{54} Nev. Gain	D_{53} Iowa; Gain	D_{52} Ind. Gain	D_{51} Ill. Gain	D_{50} Idaho; Gain	D_{49} Conn. Gain
FL_{1}	R_{37} Vt. Re-elected	R_{36} S.D. Re-elected	R_{35} Pa. Re-elected	R_{34} Ore. Re-elected	R_{33} N.D. Re-elected	R_{32} N.J. (sp); Elected	R_{31}	R_{30}	R_{29}
R_{19}	R_{20}	R_{21}	R_{22}	R_{23}	R_{24}	R_{25}	R_{26}	R_{27}	R_{28}
R_{18}	R_{17}	R_{16}	R_{15}	R_{14}	R_{13}	R_{12}	R_{11}	R_{10}	R_{9}
		R_{1}	R_{2}	R_{3}	R_{4}	R_{5}	R_{6}	R_{7}	R_{8}

Key:

D_{#}	Democratic
FL_{#}	Farmer–Labor
R_{#}	Republican

== Race summary ==
All races are general elections for class 3 seats, unless noted.

=== Elections during the 72nd Congress ===
In these elections, the winners were elected and seated during 1932; ordered by election date.

State	Incumbent			Results	Candidates
State	Senator	Party	Electoral history	Results	Candidates
Arkansas (Class 3)	Hattie Caraway	Democratic	1931 (Appointed)	Interim appointee elected January 12, 1932. Democratic hold. Winner was subsequently re-elected in November.	▌ ✓ Hattie Caraway (Democratic) 91.6%; ▌Rex Floyd (Independent) 5.2%; ▌Sam D. Carson (Independent) 3.2%
Colorado (Class 3)	Walter Walker	Democratic	1929 (Appointed)	Interim appointee lost election to finish the term. New senator elected November 8, 1932. Republican gain. Winner was not elected to the next term, see below.	▌ ✓ Karl C. Schuyler (Republican) 48.76%; ▌Walter Walker (Democratic) 48.51%; ▌Carle Whitehead (Socialist) 2.73%
Georgia (Class 2)	John S. Cohen	Democratic	1932 (Appointed)	Interim appointee retired. New senator elected November 8, 1932. Democratic hold.	▌ ✓ Richard Russell Jr. (Democratic); Unopposed
New Jersey (Class 2)	W. Warren Barbour	Republican	1931 (Appointed)	Interim appointee elected November 8, 1932.	▌ ✓ W. Warren Barbour (Republican) 49.6%; ▌Percy Hamilton Stewart (Democratic) 48.5%
North Carolina (Class 3)	Cameron A. Morrison	Democratic	1930 (Appointed)	Interim appointee lost nomination to finish the term. New senator elected November 8, 1932. Democratic hold. Winner was also elected to next term, see below.	▌ ✓ Robert R. Reynolds (Democratic) 68.7%; ▌Jake F. Newell (Republican) 31.3%

=== Elections leading to the 73rd Congress ===
All elections are for Class 3 seats.

State	Incumbent			Results	Candidates
State	Senator	Party	Electoral history	Results	Candidates
Alabama	Hugo Black	Democratic	1926	Incumbent re-elected.	▌ ✓ Hugo Black (Democratic) 86.3%; ▌J. Theodore Johnson (Republican) 13.8%
Arizona	Carl Hayden	Democratic	1926	Incumbent re-elected.	▌ ✓ Carl Hayden (Democratic) 66.7%; ▌Ralph H. Cameron (Republican) 32.1%
Arkansas	Hattie Caraway	Democratic	1931 (Appointed); 1932 (special)	Incumbent re-elected.	▌ ✓ Hattie Caraway (Democratic) 89.5%; ▌John W. White (Republican) 10.5%
California	Samuel M. Shortridge	Republican	1920; 1926	Incumbent lost renomination. New senator elected. Democratic gain.	▌ ✓ William Gibbs McAdoo (Democratic) 43.4%; ▌Tallant Tubbs (Republican) 30.8%; ▌Robert P. Shuler (Prohibition) 25.8%
Colorado	Walter Walker	Democratic	1932 (Appointed)	Interim appointee retired. New senator elected. Democratic gain. Winner was not elected to finish the term, see above.	▌ ✓ Alva B. Adams (Democratic) 52.2%; ▌Karl C. Schuyler (Republican) 45.8%; ▌Carle Whitehead (Socialist) 2.0%
Connecticut	Hiram Bingham III	Republican	1924 (special); 1926	Incumbent lost re-election. New senator elected. Democratic gain.	▌ ✓ Augustine Lonergan (Democratic) 48.5%; ▌Hiram Bingham III (Republican) 47.7%
Florida	Duncan U. Fletcher	Democratic	1909 (Appointed); 1909 (special); 1914; 1920; 1926	Incumbent re-elected.	▌ ✓ Duncan U. Fletcher (Democratic) 99.8%
Georgia	Walter F. George	Democratic	1922 (special); 1926	Incumbent re-elected.	▌ ✓ Walter F. George (Democratic) 92.8%; ▌James W. Arnold (Republican) 7.2%
Idaho	John Thomas	Republican	1928 (Appointed); 1928 (special)	Incumbent lost re-election. New senator elected. Democratic gain.	▌ ✓ James P. Pope (Democratic) 55.7%; ▌John Thomas (Republican) 42.3%
Illinois	Otis F. Glenn	Republican	1928 (special)	Incumbent lost re-election. New senator elected. Democratic gain.	▌ ✓ William H. Dieterich (Democratic) 52.2%; ▌Otis F. Glenn (Republican) 46.0%
Indiana	James E. Watson	Republican	1916 (special); 1920; 1926	Incumbent lost re-election. New senator elected. Democratic gain.	▌ ✓ Frederick Van Nuys (Democratic) 55.6%; ▌James E. Watson (Republican) 42.3%
Iowa	Smith W. Brookhart	Republican	1922 (special); 1924; 1926 (Lost (Note: Lost election challenge)); 1926	Incumbent lost renomination. Incumbent lost re-election as an independent. New senator elected. Democratic gain.	▌ ✓ Louis Murphy (Democratic) 54.9%; ▌Henry Field (Republican) 40.8%
Kansas	George McGill	Democratic	1930 (special)	Incumbent re-elected.	▌ ✓ George McGill (Democratic) 45.7%; ▌Benjamin S. Paulen (Republican) 42.0%
Kentucky	Alben W. Barkley	Democratic	1926	Incumbent re-elected.	▌ ✓ Alben W. Barkley (Democratic) 59.2%; ▌Maurice Thatcher (Republican) 40.5%
Louisiana	Edwin S. Broussard	Democratic	1920; 1926	Incumbent lost renomination. New senator elected. Democratic hold.	▌ ✓ John H. Overton (Democratic); Unopposed
Maryland	Millard Tydings	Democratic	1926	Incumbent re-elected.	▌ ✓ Millard Tydings (Democratic) 66.2%; ▌Wallace Williams (Republican) 31.2%
Missouri	Harry B. Hawes	Democratic	1926 (special); 1926	Incumbent retired. New senator elected. Democratic hold. Incumbent then resigned and winner was appointed to finish the current term.	▌ ✓ Bennett Champ Clark (Democratic) 63.2%; ▌Henry Kiel (Republican) 35.9%
Nevada	Tasker Oddie	Republican	1920; 1926	Incumbent lost re-election. New senator elected. Democratic gain.	▌ ✓ Pat McCarran (Democratic) 52.1%; ▌Tasker Oddie (Republican) 47.9%
New Hampshire	George H. Moses	Republican	1918 (special); 1920; 1926	Incumbent lost re-election. New senator elected. Democratic gain.	▌ ✓ Fred H. Brown (Democratic) 50.4%; ▌George H. Moses (Republican) 49.3%
New York	Robert F. Wagner	Democratic	1926	Incumbent re-elected.	▌ ✓ Robert F. Wagner (Democratic) 55.8%; ▌George Z. Medalie (Republican) 38.6%
North Carolina	Cameron A. Morrison	Democratic	1930 (Appointed)	Interim appointee lost nomination. New senator elected. Democratic hold. Winner was also elected to finish the current term, see above.	▌ ✓ Robert R. Reynolds (Democratic) 68.6%; ▌Jake F. Newell (Republican) 31.4%
North Dakota	Gerald Nye	Republican	1925 (Appointed); 1926 (special); 1926	Incumbent re-elected.	▌ ✓ Gerald Nye (Republican) 72.3%; ▌P. W. Lanier (Democratic) 27.5%
Ohio	Robert J. Bulkley	Democratic	1930 (special)	Incumbent re-elected.	▌ ✓ Robert J. Bulkley (Democratic) 52.5%; ▌Gilbert Bettman (Republican) 45.8%
Oklahoma	Elmer Thomas	Democratic	1926	Incumbent re-elected.	▌ ✓ Elmer Thomas (Democratic) 65.6%; ▌Wirt Franklin (Republican) 33.7%
Oregon	Frederick Steiwer	Republican	1926	Incumbent re-elected.	▌ ✓ Frederick Steiwer (Republican) 52.7%; ▌Walter B. Gleason (Democratic) 38.9%
Pennsylvania	James J. Davis	Republican	1930 (special)	Incumbent re-elected.	▌ ✓ James J. Davis (Republican) 49.3%; ▌Lawrence H. Rupp (Democratic) 43.2%
South Carolina	Ellison D. Smith	Democratic	1909; 1914; 1920; 1926	Incumbent re-elected.	▌ ✓ Ellison D. Smith (Democratic); Unopposed
South Dakota	Peter Norbeck	Republican	1920; 1926	Incumbent re-elected.	▌ ✓ Peter Norbeck (Republican) 53.8%; ▌U. S. G. Cherry (Democratic) 44.6%
Utah	Reed Smoot	Republican	1903; 1909; 1914; 1920; 1926	Incumbent lost re-election. New senator elected. Democratic gain.	▌ ✓ Elbert D. Thomas (Democratic) 56.7%; ▌Reed Smoot (Republican) 41.7%
Vermont	Porter H. Dale	Republican	1909 (Appointed); 1923 (special); 1926	Incumbent re-elected.	▌ ✓ Porter H. Dale (Republican) 55.1%; ▌Fred C. Martin (Democratic) 44.9%
Washington	Wesley L. Jones	Republican	1909; 1914; 1920; 1926	Incumbent lost re-election. New senator elected. Democratic gain. Incumbent then died November 19, 1932, and Elijah S. Grammer (R) was appointed to finish the current term.	▌ ✓ Homer Bone (Democratic) 60.6%; ▌Wesley L. Jones (Republican) 32.7%
Wisconsin	John J. Blaine	Republican	1926	Incumbent lost renomination. New senator elected. Democratic gain.	▌ ✓ F. Ryan Duffy (Democratic) 57.0%; ▌John B. Chapple (Republican) 36.2%; ▌Emil Seidel (Socialist) 6.1%

== Closest races ==
Eleven races had a margin of victory under 10%:

State	Party of winner	Margin
Colorado (special)	Republican (flip)	0.25%
Connecticut	Democratic (flip)	0.8%
New Hampshire	Democratic (flip)	1.08%
New Jersey	Republican	1.09%
Kansas	Democratic	3.7%
Nevada	Democratic (flip)	4.2%
Pennsylvania	Republican	6.1%
Illinois	Democratic (flip)	6.2%
Colorado (regular)	Democratic	6.4%
Ohio	Democratic	6.7%
South Dakota	Republican	9.2%

New York was the tipping point state with a margin of 17.2%.

== Alabama ==
1932 United States Senate election in Alabama
- November 8, 1932
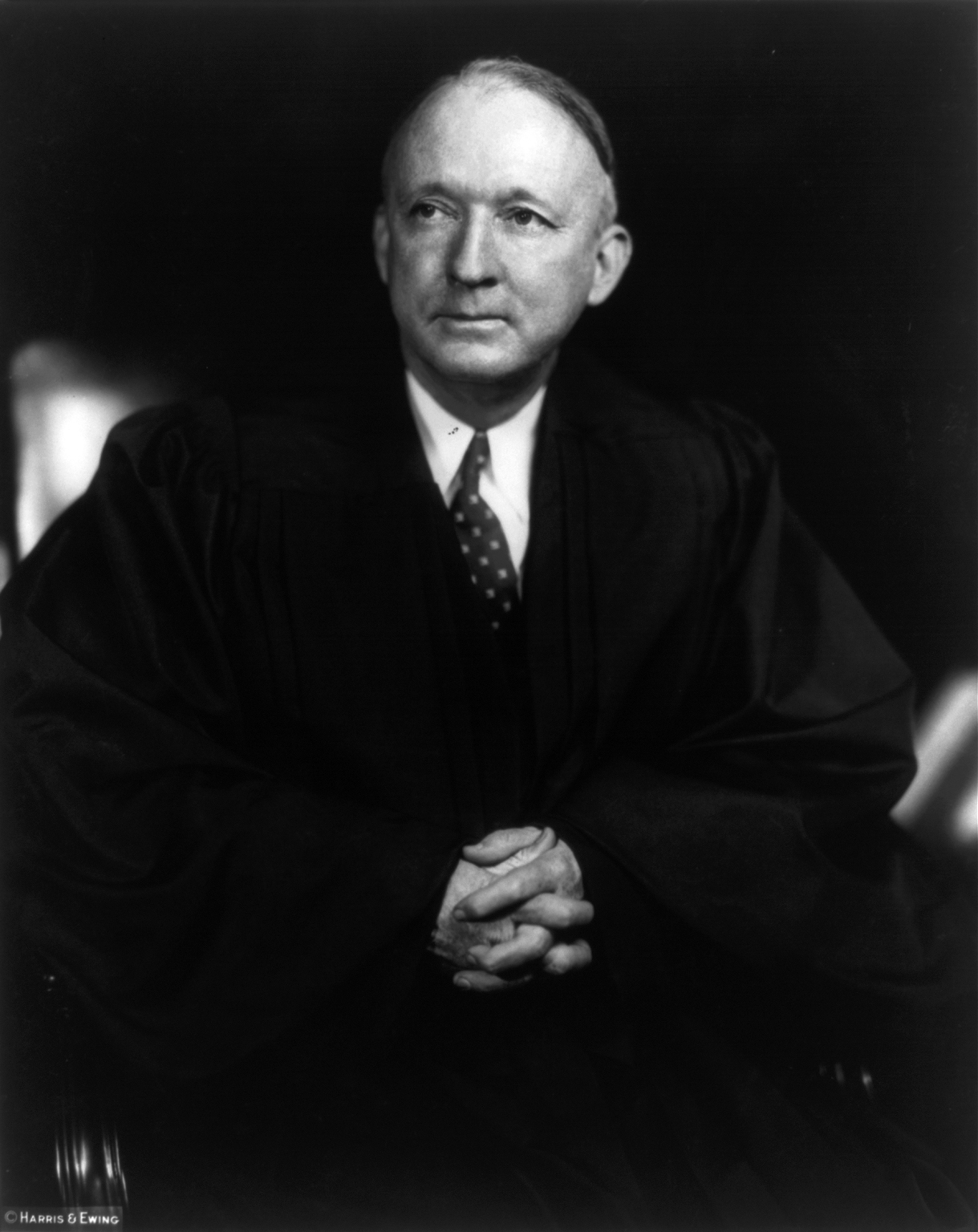

Nominee	Hugo Black	J. Theodore Johnson
Party	Democratic	Republican
Popular vote	209,615	33,425
Percentage	86.25%	13.75%
- County results Black: 50–60% 60–70% 70–80% 80–90% 90–100% Johnson: 50–60%
U.S. senator before election
Hugo Black
Democratic
Elected U.S. Senator
Hugo Black
Democratic

Alabama election
Party	Candidate	Votes	%
Democratic	Hugo Black (incumbent)	209,615	86.25%
Republican	J. Theodore Johnson	33,425	13.75%
Majority		176,189	72.50%
Turnout		243,039	
Democratic hold			

== Arizona ==
1932 United States Senate election in Arizona
- November 8, 1932
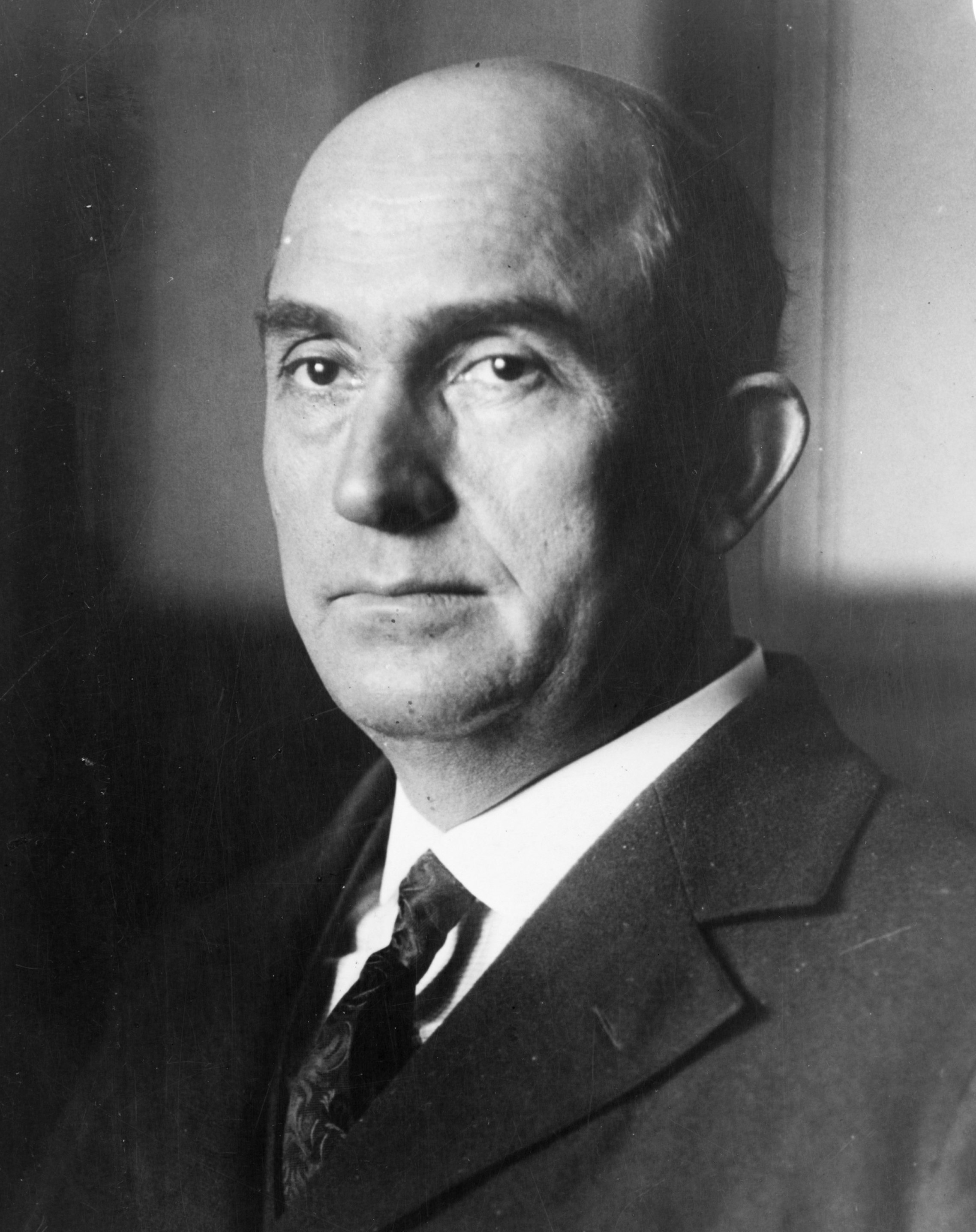

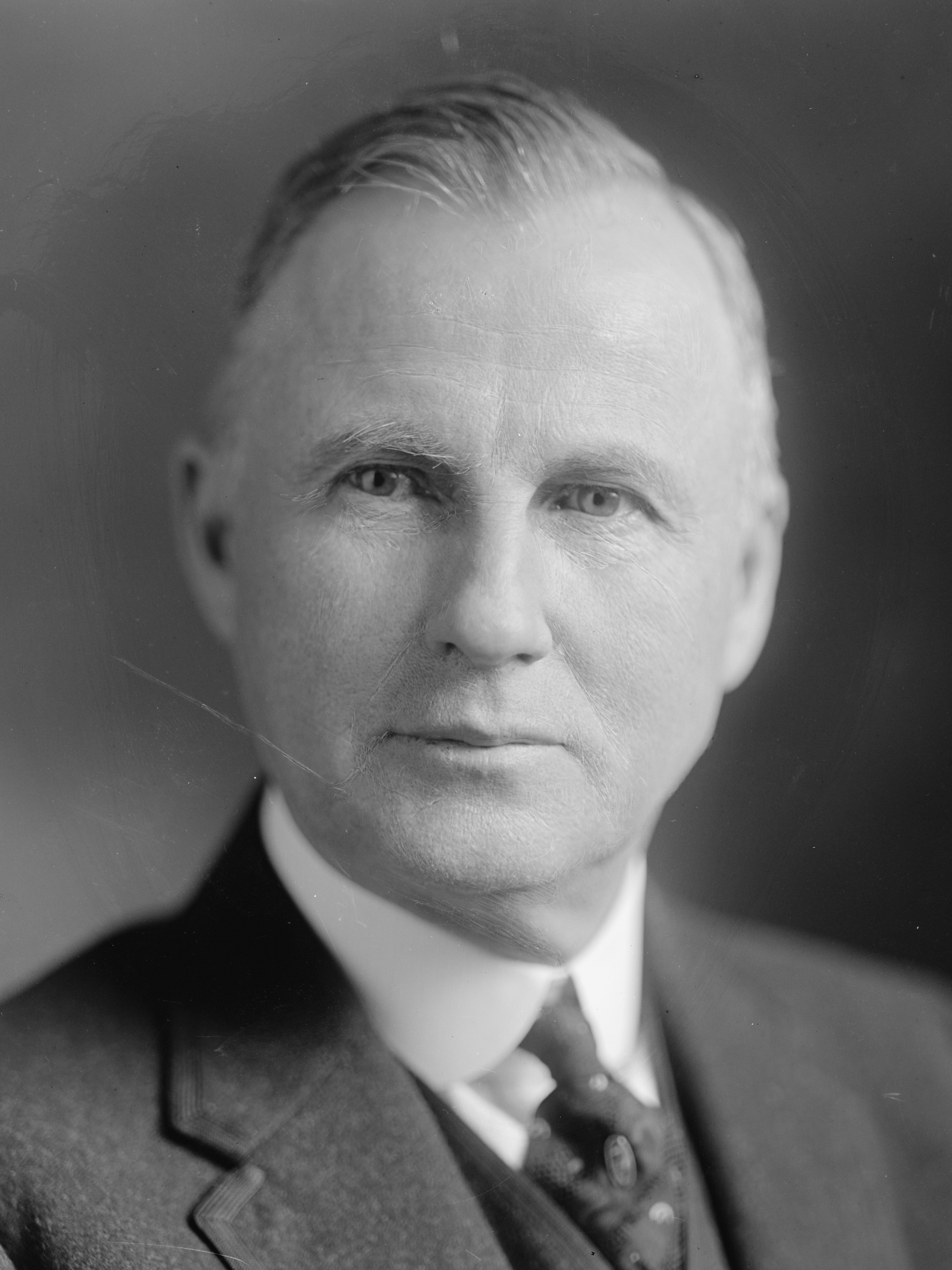
Nominee	Carl Hayden	Ralph H. Cameron
Party	Democratic	Republican
Popular vote	74,310	35,737
Percentage	66.67%	32.06%
- County results Hayden: 60–70% 70–80% 80–90%
U.S. senator before election
Carl Hayden
Democratic
Elected U.S. Senator
Carl Hayden
Democratic

1932 United States Senate election in Arizona
Party	Candidate	Votes	%	±%
Democratic	Carl T. Hayden (incumbent)	74,310	66.67%	
Republican	Ralph H. Cameron	35,737	32.06%	
Socialist	Lester B. Woolever	1,110	1.00%	
Communist	Edward Haustgen	306	0.28%	
Majority		38,573	34.61%	
Turnout		111,463		
Democratic hold		Swing		

== Arkansas ==
There were two elections for the same seat, due to the November 6, 1931 death of two-term Democrat Thaddeus H. Caraway.

Caraway's widow, Democrat Hattie Wyatt Caraway, was appointed November 13, 1931 to continue his term.

=== Arkansas (special) ===
1932 U.S. Senate special election in Arkansas
- November 8, 1932
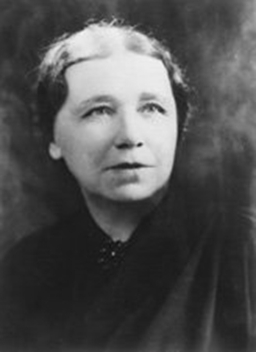

Nominee	Hattie Caraway	Rex Floyd	Sam D. Carson
Party	Democratic	Independent	Independent
Popular vote	31,133	1,752	1,095
Percentage	91.62%	5.16%	3.22%
- County results Caraway: 50–60% 60–70% 70–80% 80–90% >90% Carson: 70–80% No Vote
U.S. senator before election
Hattie Caraway
Democratic
Elected U.S. Senator
Hattie Caraway
Democratic

Arkansas special election (January 12, 1932)
Party	Candidate	Votes	%
Democratic	Hattie Wyatt Caraway (incumbent)	31,133	91.62%
Independent	Rex Floyd	1,752	5.16%
Independent	Sam D. Carson	1,095	3.22%
Majority			
Turnout			1.83%
Democratic hold			

=== Arkansas (regular) ===
1932 U.S. Senate special election in Arkansas
- November 8, 1932
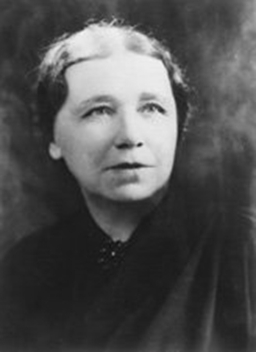

Nominee	Hattie Caraway	John H. White
Party	Democratic	Republican
Popular vote	187,994	21,558
Percentage	89.71%	10.29%
- County results Caraway: 50–60% 70–80% 80–90% >90% White: 50–60%
U.S. senator before election
Hattie Caraway
Democratic
Elected U.S. Senator
Hattie Caraway
Democratic

In May 1932, Caraway surprised Arkansas politicians by announcing that she would run for a full term in the upcoming election, joining a field already crowded with prominent candidates who had assumed she would step aside. She told reporters, "The time has passed when a woman should be placed in a position and kept there only while someone else is being groomed for the job." When she was invited by Vice President Charles Curtis to preside over the Senate she took advantage of the situation to announce that she would run for reelection. Populist former Governor and Senator Huey Long of neighboring Louisiana traveled to Arkansas on a seven-day campaign swing on her behalf. She was the first female senator to preside over the body as well as the first to chair a committee (Senate Committee on Enrolled Bills). Lacking any significant political backing, Caraway accepted the offer of help from Long, whose efforts to limit incomes of the wealthy and increase aid to the poor she had supported. Long was also motivated by sympathy for the widow and his ambition to extend his influence into the home state of his party rival, Senator Joseph Robinson, who had been Al Smith's vice-presidential candidate in 1928. Bringing his colorful and flamboyant campaign style to Arkansas, Long stumped the state with Caraway for a week just before the Democratic primary. He helped her to amass nearly twice as many votes as her closest opponent.

Long effectively used a method to quiet crying babies at campaign stops in Arkansas to encourage voter interest:

Mrs. Caraway would never forget nor cease to laugh over the plans we made for caring for obstreperous infants in the audience so that their mothers might listen to the speeches without the crowds being disturbed. I remember when I saw her notice one of our campaigners take charge of the first baby. The child began fretting and then began to cry. One of the young men accompanying us immediately gave it a drink of water. The child quieted for a bit and resumed a whimper, whereupon the same campaign worker handed the baby an all-day sucker, which it immediately grasped and soon fell asleep. Mrs. Caraway did not understand that it was a matter of design until it had been repeated several times.

Caraway went on to win the general election in November, with the accompanying victory of Franklin D. Roosevelt as U.S. President.

Arkansas general election (November 8, 1932)
Party	Candidate	Votes	%
Democratic	Hattie Wyatt Caraway (incumbent)	187,994	89.71%
Republican	John W. White	21,558	10.29%
Majority		166,436	79.42%
Turnout		209,552	
Democratic hold			

== California ==
1932 United States Senate election in California
- November 6, 1932
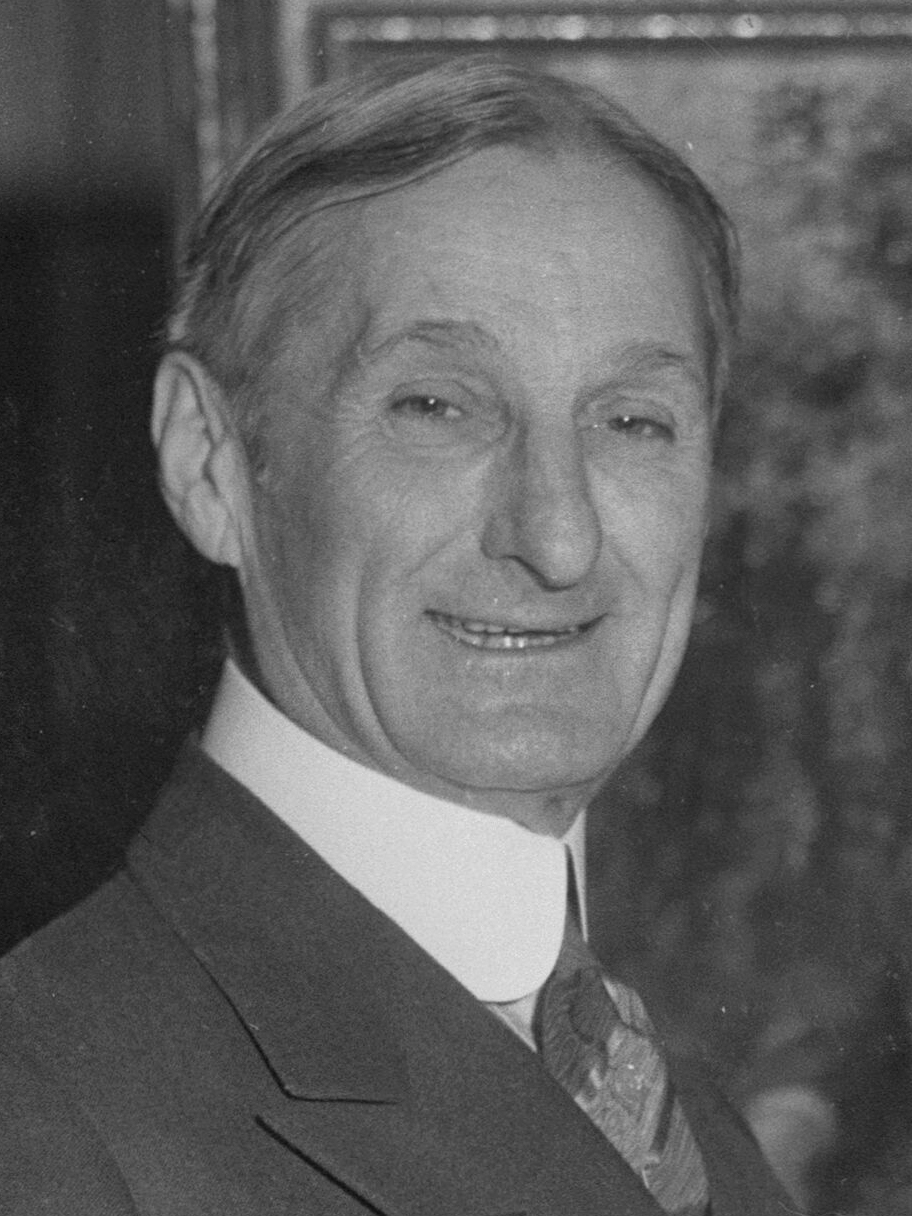

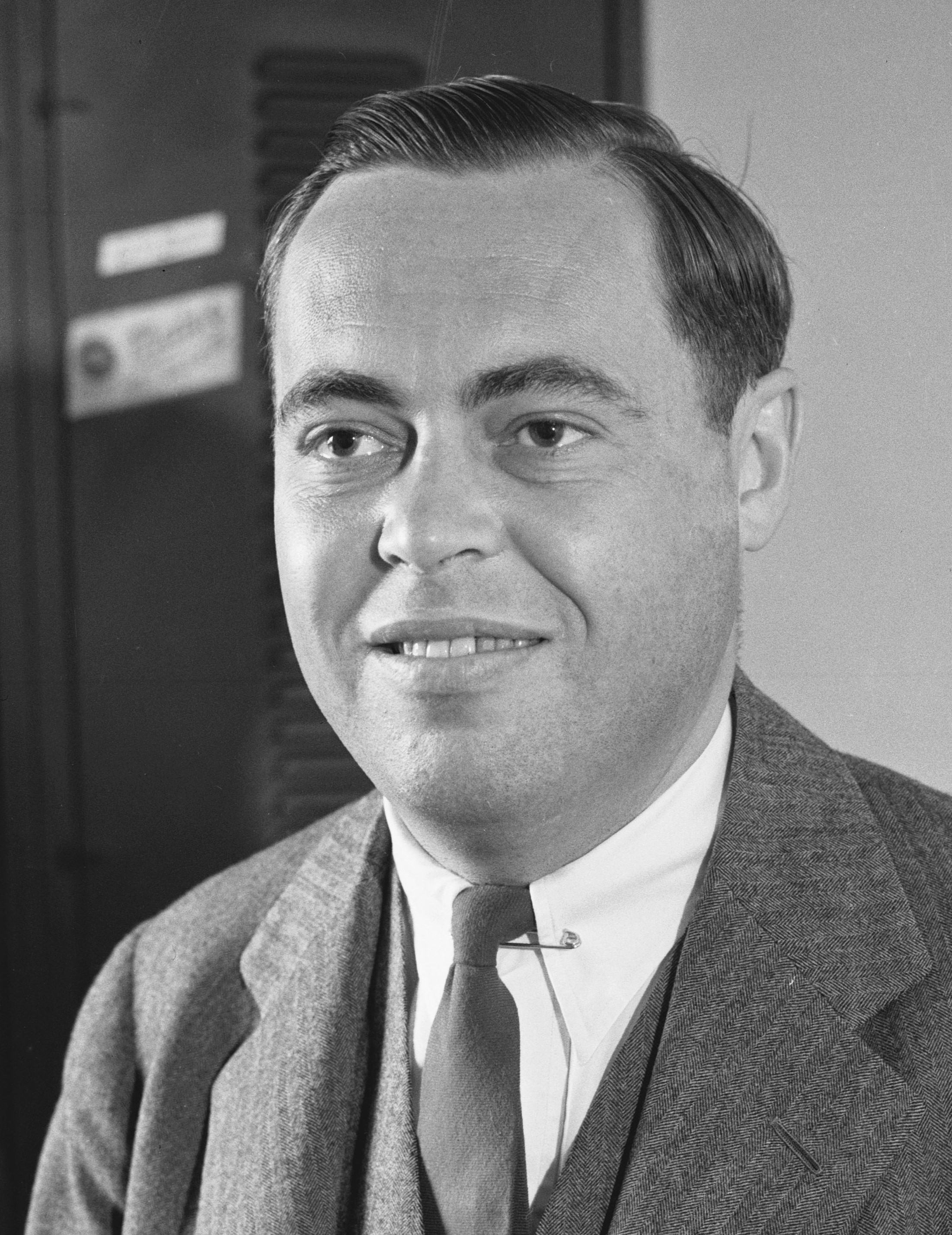

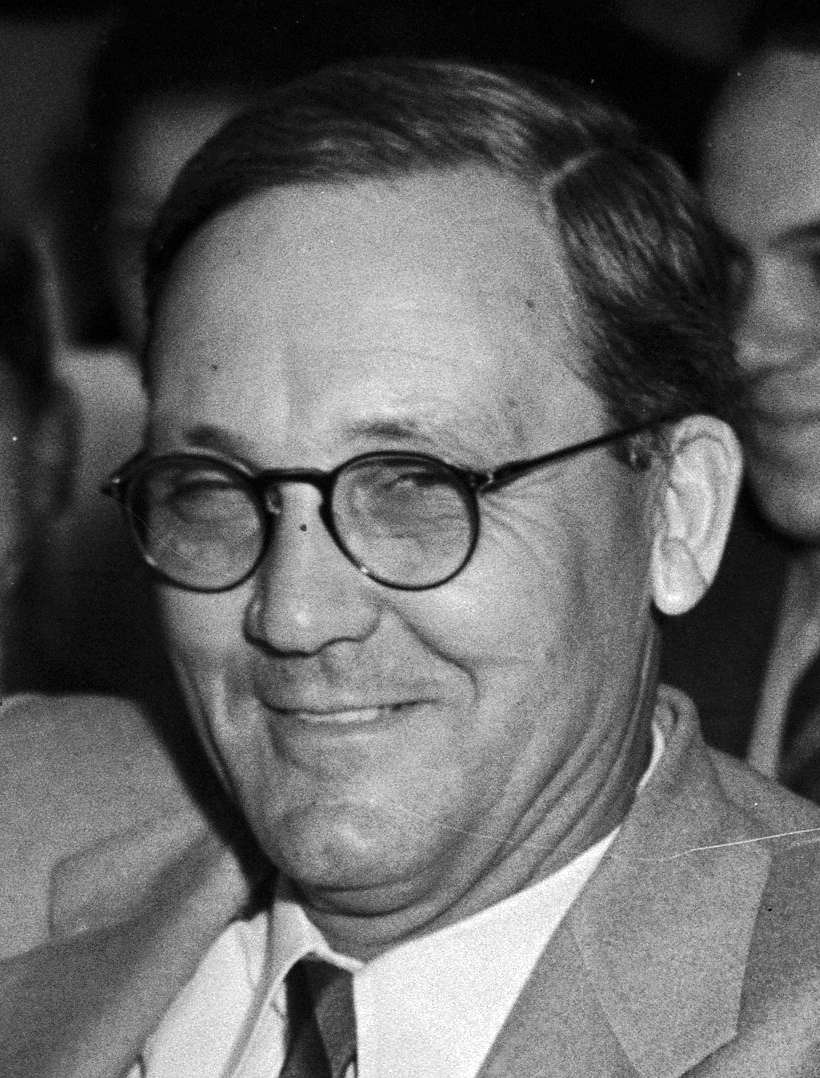
Nominee	William Gibbs McAdoo	Tallant Tubbs	Robert P. Shuler
Party	Democratic	Republican	Prohibition
Popular vote	943,164	669,676	560,088
Percentage	43.39%	30.81%	25.77%
- Election results by county McAdoo: 30–40% 40–50% 50–60% 60–70% Tubbs: 30–40% 40–50% 50–60% 60–70% Shuler: 30–40% 40–50%
U.S. senator before election
Samuel Morgan Shortridge
Republican
Elected U.S. Senator
William Gibbs McAdoo
Democratic

California election
Party	Candidate	Votes	%
Democratic	William Gibbs McAdoo	943,164	43.39%
Republican	Tallant Tubbs	669,676	30.81%
Prohibition	Robert P. Shuler	560,088	25.76%
Write-In	George Ross Kirkpatrick	466	0.02%
None	Scattering	440	0.02%
Majority		273,488	12.58%
Turnout		2,173,834	
Democratic gain from Republican			

== Colorado ==
There were two elections on November 8, 1932, for the same seat, due to the death of one-term Republican Charles W. Waterman. The primaries were held on September 13, 1932.

=== Colorado (special) ===
1932 United States Senate special election in Colorado
- November 8, 1932
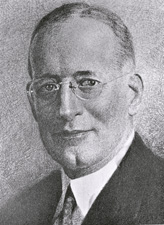

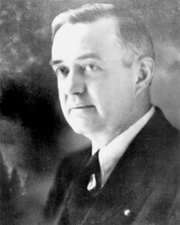
Nominee	Karl C. Schuyler	Walter Walker
Party	Republican	Democratic
Popular vote	207,540	206,475
Percentage	48.76%	48.51%
- Results by county Schuyler: 40–50% 50–60% Walker: 40–50% 50–60% 60–70%
U.S. senator before election
Walter Walker
Democratic
Elected U.S. Senator
Karl Schuyler
Republican

Democrat Walter Walker was appointed to continue the term, pending the special election, which he then lost.

Republican attorney Karl C. Schuyler was elected to finish the term, but he lost the contemporaneous election to the next term. He died in 1933.

Colorado special election
Party	Candidate	Votes	%
Republican	Karl C. Schuyler	207,540	48.76%
Democratic	Walter Walker (incumbent)	206,475	48.51%
Socialist	Carle Whitehead	11,619	2.73%
Majority		1,065	0.25%
Turnout			41.09%
Republican gain from Democratic			

=== Colorado (regular) ===
1932 United States Senate election in Colorado
- November 8, 1932
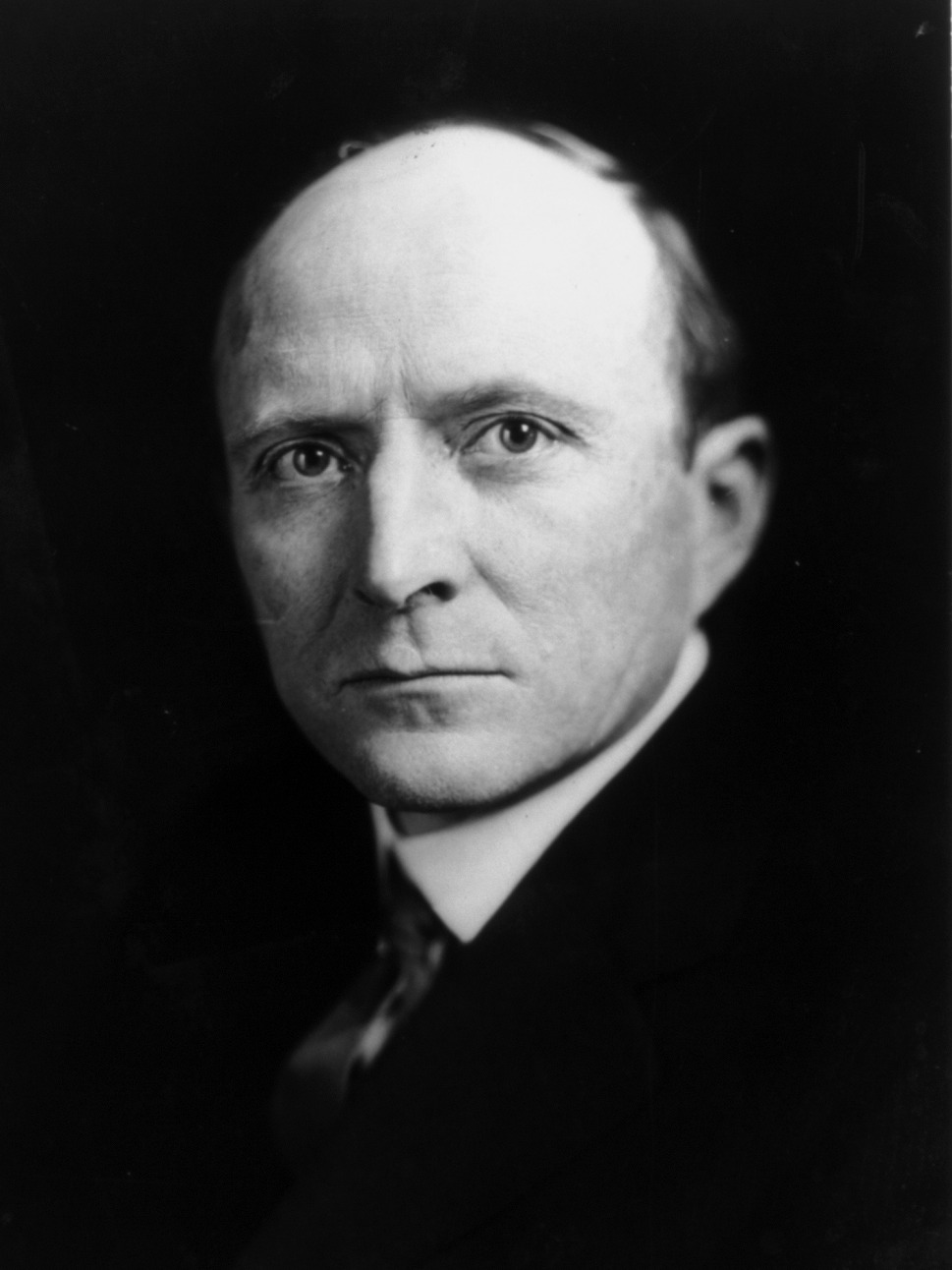

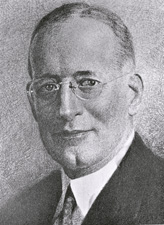
Nominee	Alva B. Adams	Karl C. Schuyler
Party	Democratic	Republican
Popular vote	226,516	198,519
Percentage	51.91%	45.50%
- Results by county Adams: 40–50% 50–60% 60–70% Schuyler: 40–50% 50–60%
U.S. senator before election
Walter Walker
Democratic
Elected U.S. Senator
Alva B. Adams
Democratic

Democratic former senator Alva B. Adams was elected to start the new term that would begin in March 1933.

Colorado regular election
Party	Candidate	Votes	%
Democratic	Alva B. Adams	226,516	52.23%
Republican	Karl C. Schuyler	198,519	45.78%
Socialist	Carle Whitehead	8,636	1.99%
Farmer–Labor	Huston Hugh Marrs	1,814	0.42%
Communist	Raymond D. D. Richardson	858	0.20%
Majority		27,997	6.42%
Turnout		433,671	42.13%
Democratic hold			

Adams would be re-elected once and serve until his December 1, 1941 death.

== Connecticut ==
1932 United States Senate election in Connecticut
- November 8, 1932
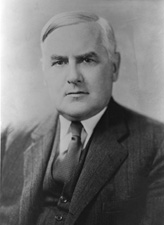

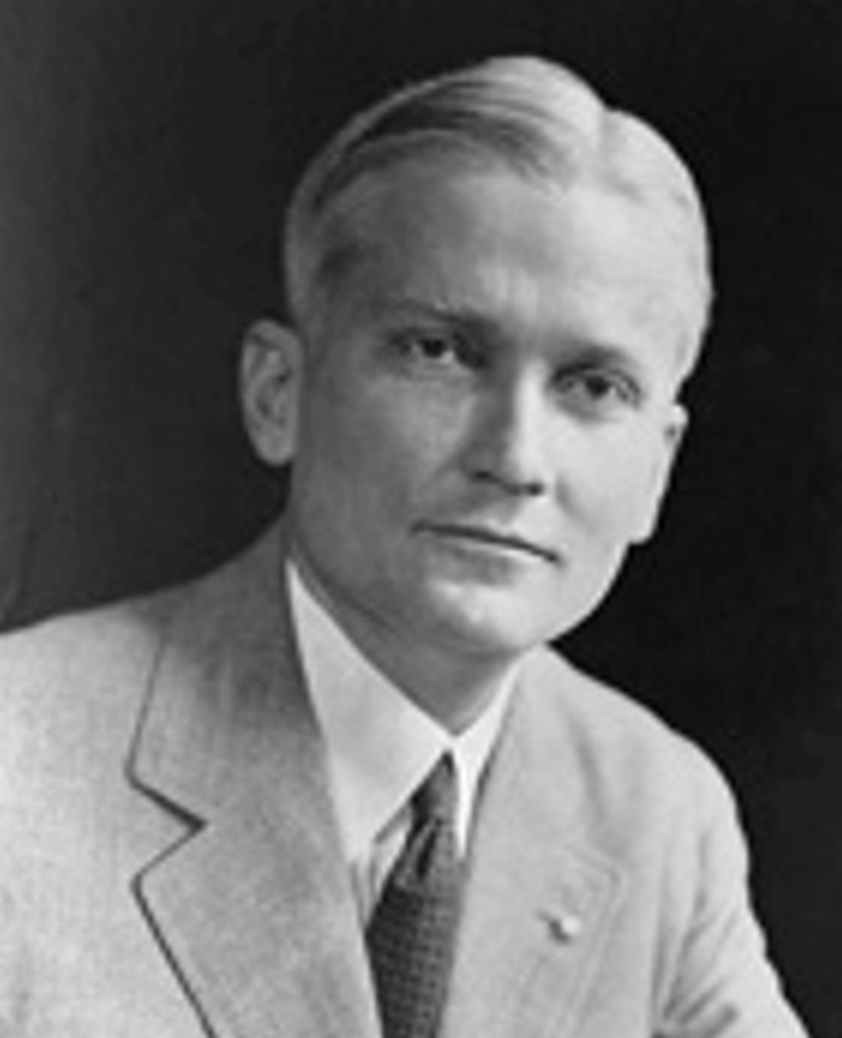
Nominee	Augustine Lonergan	Hiram Bingham III
Party	Democratic	Republican
Popular vote	282,327	278,061
Percentage	47.50%	46.78%
- Lonergan: 50–60% 60–70% Bingham: 50–60% 60–70% 70–80% 80–90% Tie: 50%
U.S. senator before election
Hiram Bingham III
Republican
Elected U.S. Senator
Augustine Lonergan
Democratic

Connecticut election
Party	Candidate	Votes	%
Democratic	Augustine Lonergan	282,327	47.50%
Republican	Hiram Bingham III (incumbent)	278,061	46.78%
Socialist	Devere Allen	19,774	3.33%
Independent Republican	Milton Conover	10,621	1.79%
Socialist Labor	John L. Grennan	2,243	0.38%
Communist	William Secker	1,376	0.23%
Majority		4,266	0.72%
Turnout		594,402	
Democratic gain from Republican			

== Florida ==
1932 United States Senate election in Florida
- November 8, 1932
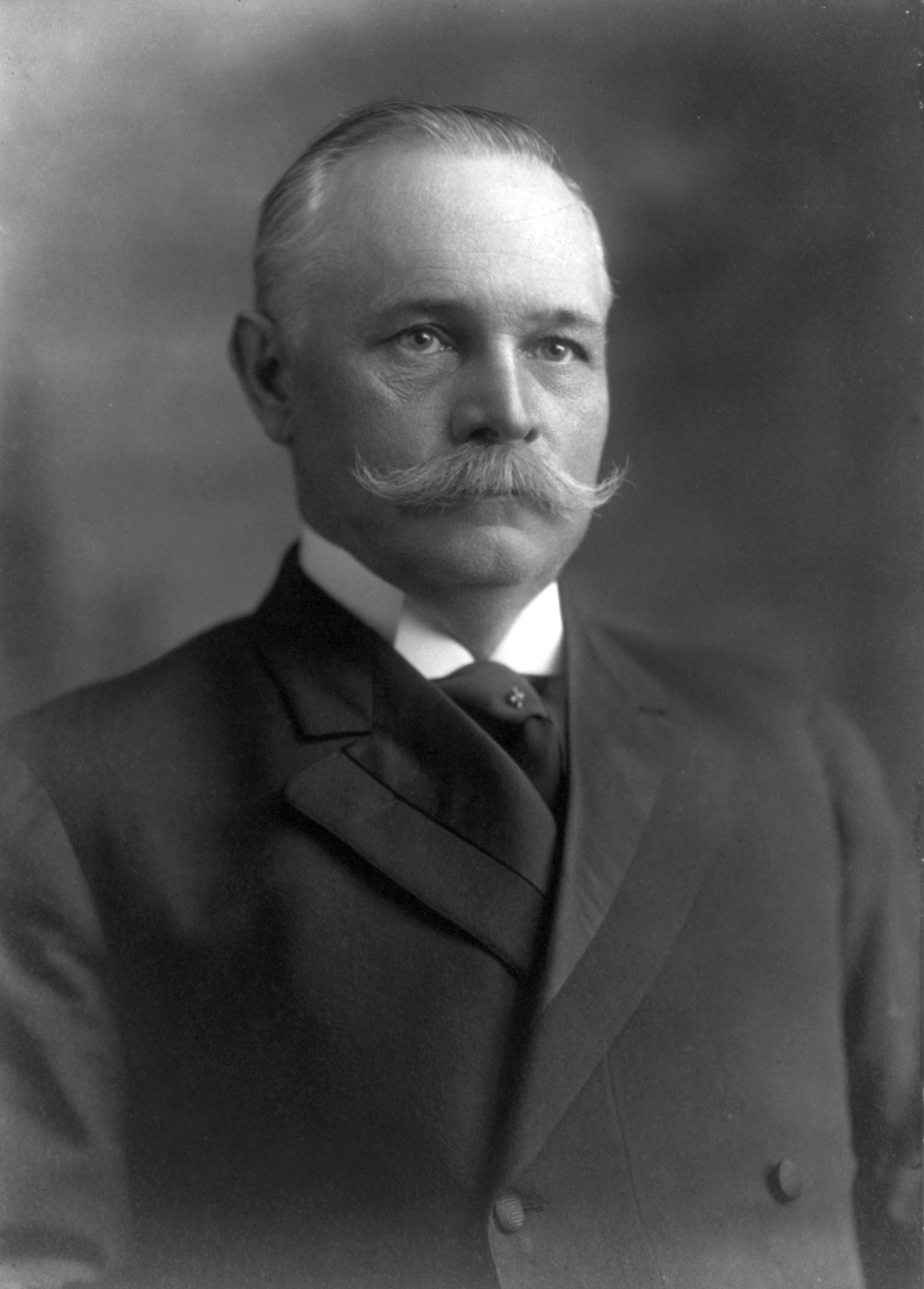
Nominee	Duncan U. Fletcher
Party	Democratic
Popular vote	204,651
Percentage	100.00%
- County results Fletcher: 90–100%
U.S. senator before election
Duncan U. Fletcher
Democratic
Elected U.S. Senator
Duncan U. Fletcher
Democratic

Florida election
Party	Candidate	Votes	%
Democratic	Duncan U. Fletcher (incumbent)	204,651	100%
Turnout		204,651	
Democratic hold			

== Georgia ==
There were two elections due to the death of William J. Harris. It was only the second time that both of Georgia's Senate seats have been up for election at the same time, following double-barrel elections in 1914.

=== Georgia (regular) ===
1932 United States Senate election in Georgia
- November 8, 1932
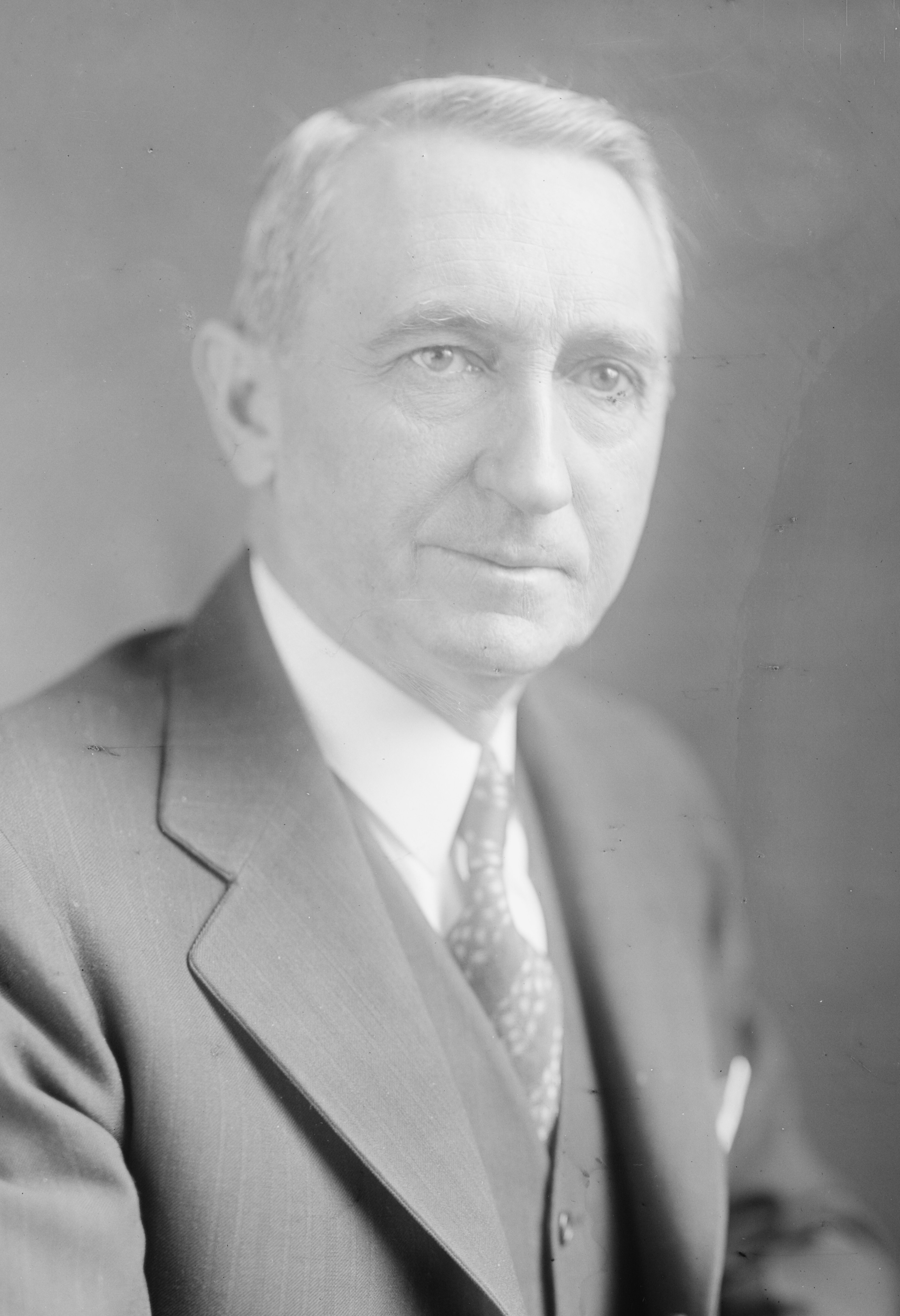
Nominee	Walter F. George	James W. Arnold
Party	Democratic	Republican
Popular vote	234,490	18,151
Percentage	92.82%	7.18%
- County results George: 60–70% 70–80% 80–90% 90–100% Arnold: 50–60% 60–70%
U.S. senator before election
Walter F. George
Democratic
Elected U.S. Senator
Walter F. George
Democratic

Georgia regular election
Party	Candidate	Votes	%
Democratic	Walter F. George (incumbent)	234,490	92.82%
Republican	James W. Arnold	18,151	7.18%
Majority		216,339	85.64%
Turnout		252,641	
Democratic hold			

=== Georgia (special) ===
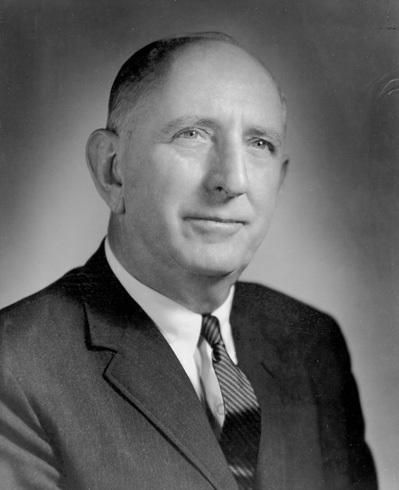
Senator Richard Russell Jr.

Democratic incumbent William J. Harris died April 18, 1932. Richard Russell Jr., the Democratic Governor of Georgia, appointed fellow-Democrat John S. Cohen April 25, 1932 to continue the term but Cohen was not a candidate for election.

Russell then won the September 14, 1932 Democratic primary over Representative Charles R. Crisp (nicknamed by Russell as "kilowatt Charlie" due to his links to the unpopular Georgia Power Company), 57.72% to 42.28%. Russell was then unopposed in the November 8, 1932 special election.

Democratic primary results
Party	Candidate	Votes	%
Democratic	Richard Russell Jr.	162,745	57.72
Democratic	Charles R. Crisp	119,193	42.28
Total votes		281,938	100.00

United States Senate special election in Georgia, 1932
Party	Candidate	Votes	%
Democratic	Richard Russell Jr.	244,031	100.00
Total votes		244,031	100.00

== Idaho ==
1932 United States Senate election in Idaho
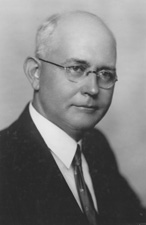

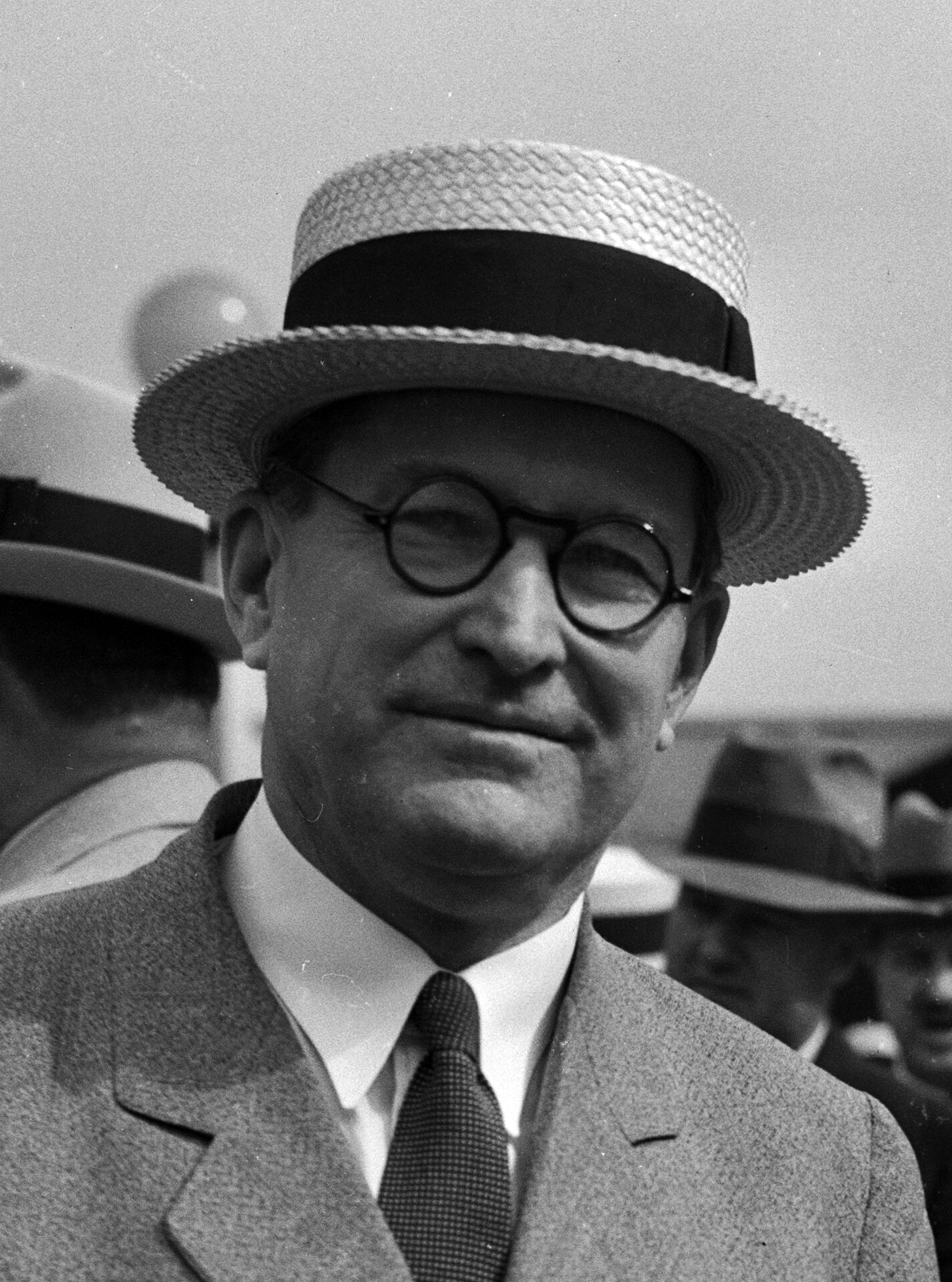
Nominee	James P. Pope	John Thomas
Party	Democratic	Republican
Popular vote	103,020	78,325
Percentage	55.64%	42.30%
- County results Pope: 40–50% 50–60% 60–70% Thomas: 50–60%
U.S. senator before election
John Thomas
Republican
Elected U.S. Senator
James P. Pope
Democratic

Idaho election
Party	Candidate	Votes	%
Democratic	James P. Pope	103,020	55.64%
Republican	John Thomas (incumbent)	78,325	42.30%
Liberty	Earl A. Oliason	3,801	2.05%
Majority		24,695	13.34%
Turnout		185,146	
Democratic gain from Republican			

== Illinois ==
1932 United States Senate election in Illinois
- November 8, 1932
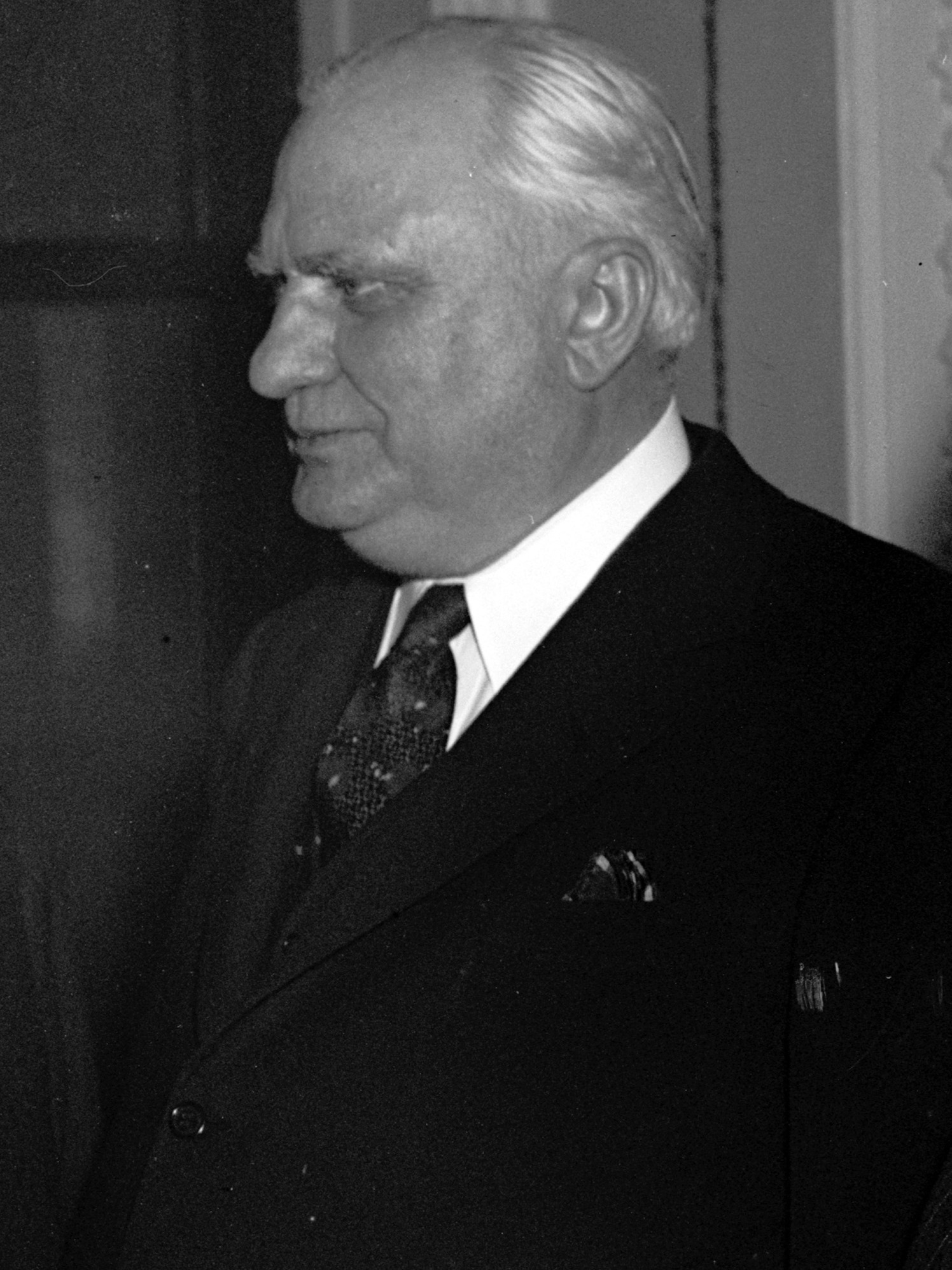

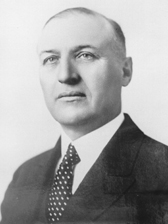
Nominee	William H. Dieterich	Otis F. Glenn
Party	Democratic	Republican
Popular vote	1,670,466	1,471,841
Percentage	52.23%	46.02%
- Results by county Dieterich: 40–50% 50–60% 60–70% 70–80% Glenn: 40–50% 50–60% 60–70% 70–80%
U.S. senator before election
Otis F. Glenn
Republican
Elected U.S. senator
William H. Dieterich
Democratic

Illinois election
Party	Candidate	Votes	%
Democratic	William H. Dieterich	1,670,466	52.23%
Republican	Otis F. Glenn (incumbent)	1,471,841	46.02%
Socialist	Charles Pogorelec	37,922	1.19%
Communist	William E. Browder	13,318	0.42%
Socialist Labor	G. A. Jenning	3,379	0.11%
Independent	William. J. Baker	1,209	0.04%
None	Scattering	16	0.00%
Majority		198,625	6.21%
Turnout		3,198,151	
Democratic gain from Republican			

== Indiana ==
1932 United States Senate election in Indiana
- November 8, 1932
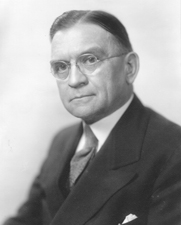

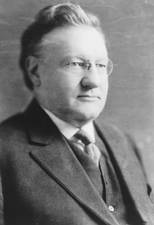
Nominee	Frederick Van Nuys	James E. Watson
Party	Democratic	Republican
Popular vote	870,053	661,750
Percentage	55.57%	42.26%
- County results Van Nuys: 40–50% 50–60% 60–70% 70–80% Watson: 40–50% 50–60%
U.S. senator before election
James E. Watson
Republican
Elected U.S. Senator
Frederick Van Nuys
Democratic

Indiana election
Party	Candidate	Votes	%
Democratic	Frederick Van Nuys	870,053	56.80%
Republican	James Eli Watson (incumbent)	661,750	43.20%
Majority		208,303	13.60%
Turnout		1,531,803	
Democratic gain from Republican			

== Iowa ==
1932 United States Senate election in Iowa
- November 8, 1932
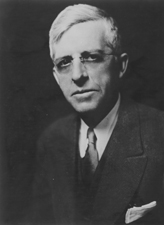

Nominee	Louis Murphy	Henry Field
Party	Democratic	Republican
Popular vote	538,422	399,929
Percentage	54.15%	40.22%
- Murphy: 30–40% 40–50% 50–60% 60–70% 70–80% Field: 40–50% 50–60%
U.S. senator before election
Smith W. Brookhart
Republican
Elected U.S. Senator
Louis Murphy
Democratic

Primaries were held on June 6, 1932.

Iowa election
Party	Candidate	Votes	%
Democratic	Richard L. Murphy	538,422	54.15%
Republican	Henry Field	399,929	40.22%
Progressive Party (United States, 1924–34)	Smith W. Brookhart (incumbent)	43,174	4.34%
Socialist	T. S. McCrill	11,076	1.11%
Farmer–Labor	Roy M. Harrop	1,228	0.12%
Communist	Peter Hunter	467	0.05%
Majority		138,493	13.93%
Turnout		994,296	40.24%
Democratic gain from Republican			

Murphy served only 3 years until his July 16, 1936 death.

== Kansas ==
1932 United States Senate election in Kansas
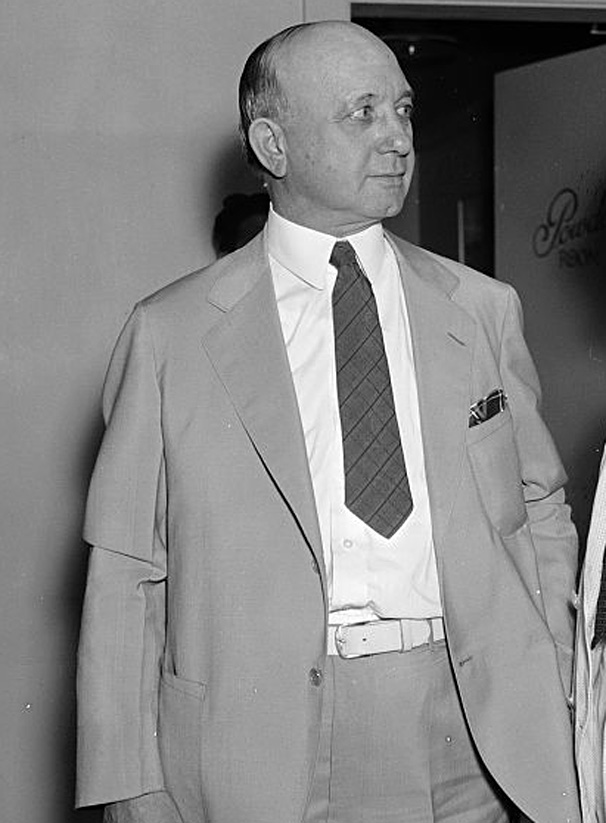

Nominee	George McGill	Ben S. Paulen	George A. Brown
Party	Democratic	Republican	Independent
Popular vote	328,992	302,809	65,583
Percentage	45.67%	42.03%	9.10%
- County results McGill: 30–40% 40–50% 50–60% 60–70% Paulen: 40–50% 50–60%
U.S. senator before election
George McGill
Democratic
Elected U.S. Senator
George McGill
Democratic

Kansas election
Party	Candidate	Votes	%
Democratic	George McGill (incumbent)	328,992	45.67%
Republican	Ben S. Paulen	302,809	42.03%
Independent	George A. Brown	65,583	9.10%
Independent	J. F. W. Renker	14,550	2.02%
Socialist	E. Haldeman-Julius	8,474	1.18%
Majority		26,183	3.64%
Turnout		720,408	
Democratic hold			

== Kentucky ==
Kentucky election

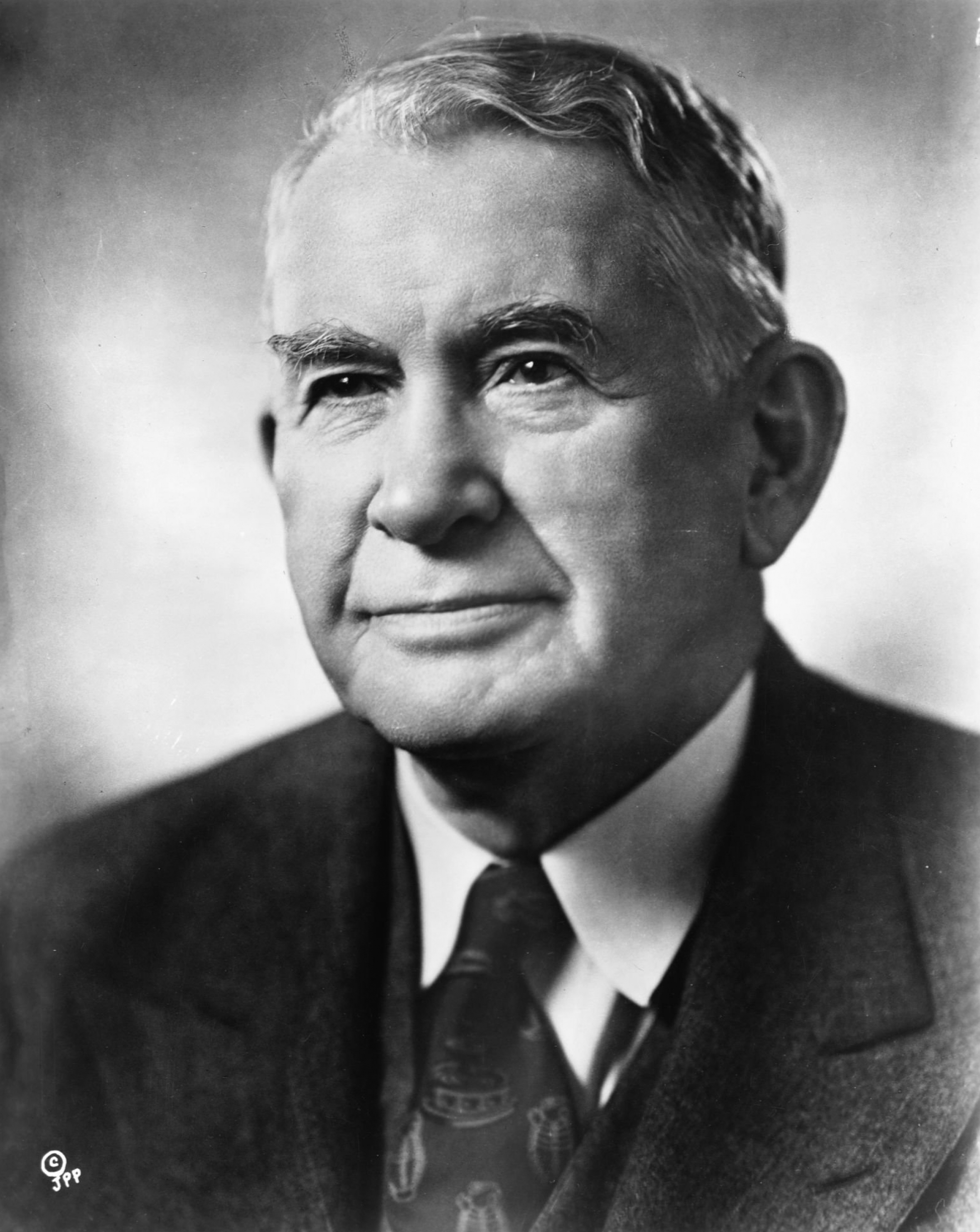

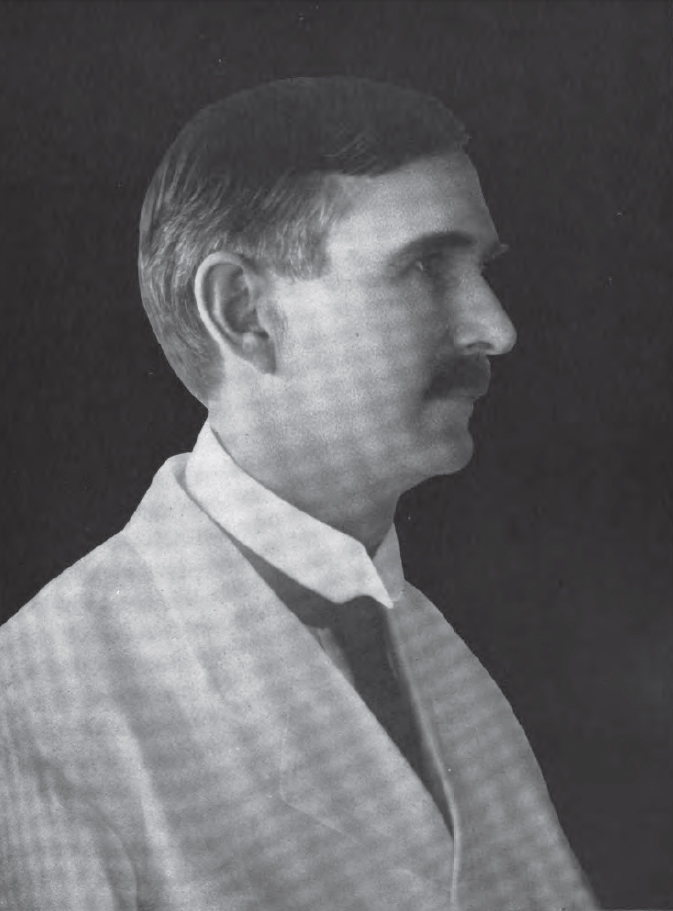
Nominee	Alben W. Barkley	Maurice H. Thatcher
Party	Democratic	Republican
Popular vote	575,077	393,865
Percentage	59.15%	40.51%
- County results Barkley: 50–60% 60–70% 70–80% 80–90% Thatcher: 40–50% 50–60% 60–70% 70–80% 80–90%
U.S. senator before election
Alben W. Barkley
Democratic
Elected U.S. senator
Alben W. Barkley
Democratic

Kentucky election
Party	Candidate	Votes	%
Democratic	Alben W. Barkley (incumbent)	575,077	59.15%
Republican	Maurice H. Thatcher	393,865	40.51%
Socialist	W. E. Sandefur	3,291	0.34%
Majority		181,212	18.64%
Turnout		972,233	
Democratic hold			

== Louisiana ==
1932 Democratic Senate primary election in Louisiana
- September 13, 1932
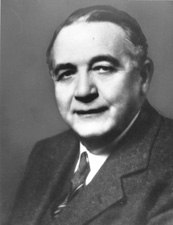

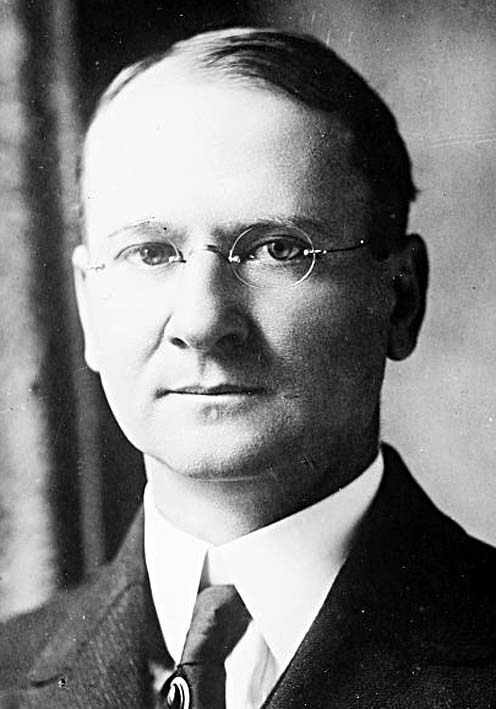
Nominee	John H. Overton	Edwin S. Broussard
Party	Democratic	Democratic
Popular vote	181,464	124,935
Percentage	59.23%	40.78%
U.S. senator before election
Edwin S. Broussard
Democratic
Elected U.S. Senator
John H. Overton
Democratic

Louisiana election
Party	Candidate	Votes	%
Democratic	John H. Overton (incumbent)	249,189	100.00%
None	Scattering	3	0.00%
Majority		249,186	100.00%
Turnout		249,192	
Democratic hold			

== Maryland ==
1932 United States Senate election in Maryland
- November 8, 1932
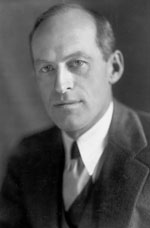

Nominee	Millard Tydings	Wallace Williams
Party	Democratic	Republican
Popular vote	293,389	138,536
Percentage	66.18%	31.25%
- County results Tydings: 40–50% 50–60% 60–70% 70–80% Williams: 50–60%
U.S. senator before election
Millard Tydings
Democratic
Elected U.S. Senator
Millard Tydings
Democratic

Maryland election
Party	Candidate	Votes	%
Democratic	Millard Tydings (incumbent)	293,389	66.18%
Republican	Wallace Williams	138,536	31.25%
Socialist	William A. Toole	8,105	1.83%
Socialist Labor	Noah S. Twigg	1,859	0.42%
Communist	Carl Bradley	1,449	0.33%
Majority		154,843	34.93%
Turnout		443,338	
Democratic hold			

== Missouri ==
1932 United States Senate election in Missouri
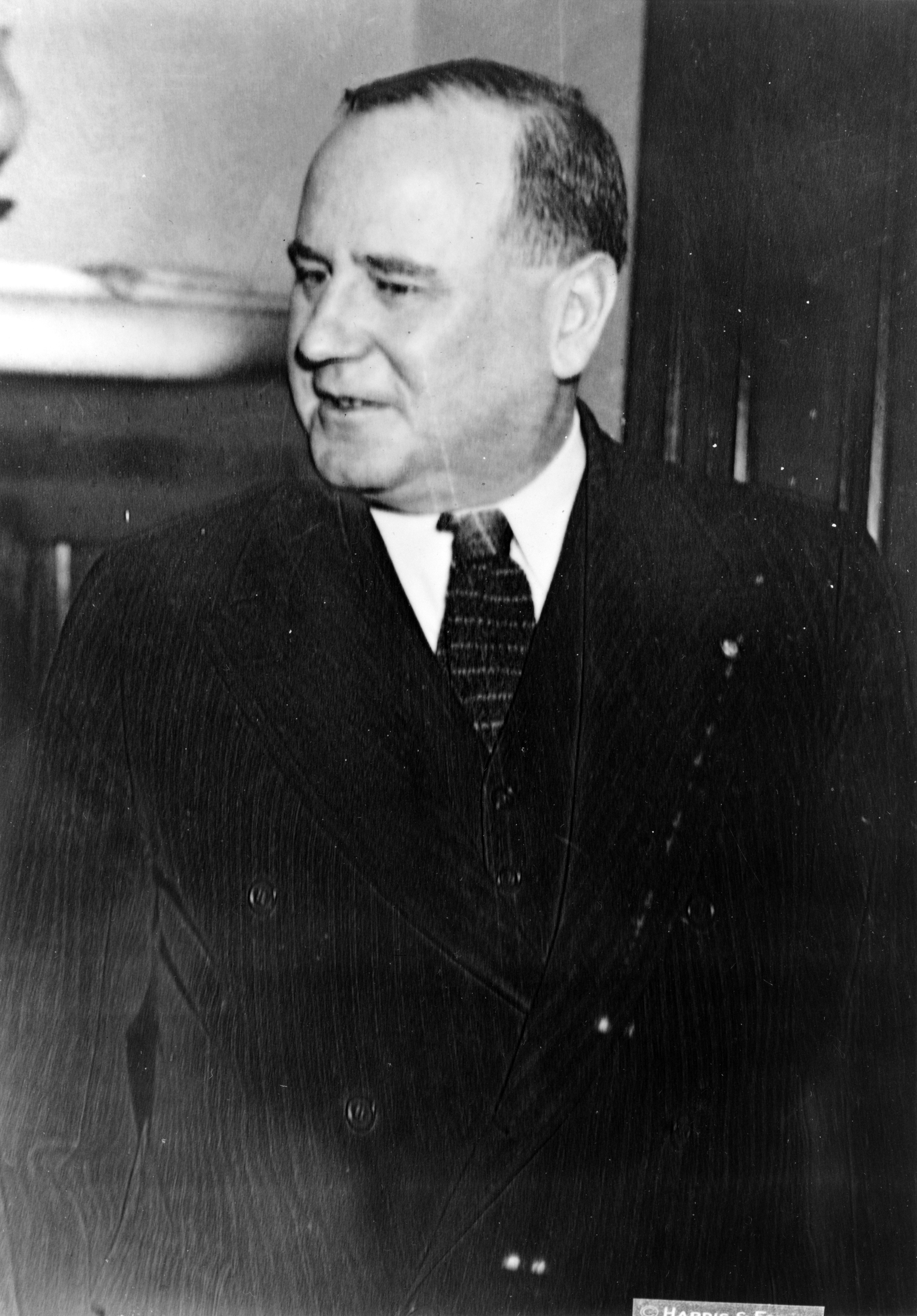

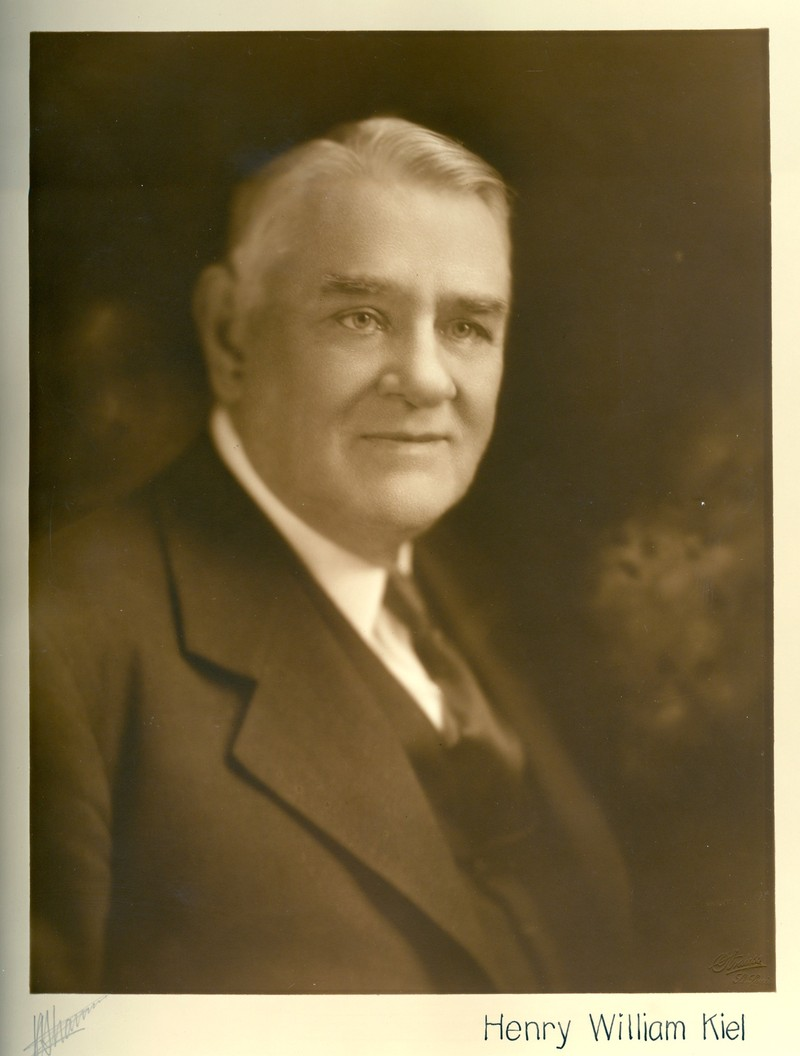
Nominee	Bennett Champ Clark	Henry Kiel
Party	Democratic	Republican
Popular vote	1,017,046	575,174
Percentage	63.26%	35.77%
- County results Clark: 50–60% 60–70% 70–80% 80–90% Kiel: 50–60% 60–70%
U.S. senator before election
Harry B. Hawes
Democratic
Elected U.S. senator
Bennett Champ Clark
Democratic

Missouri election
Party	Candidate	Votes	%
Democratic	Bennett Champ Clark	1,017,046	63.26%
Republican	Henry Kiel	575,174	35.77%
Socialist	J. G. Hodges	11,441	0.71%
Prohibition	Herman P. Faris	3,147	0.20%
Communist	Julius Pollack	533	0.03%
Socialist Labor	Karl L. Oberhue	417	0.03%
Majority		441,872	27.49%
Turnout		1,607,758	
Democratic hold			

== Nevada ==
1932 United States Senate election in Nevada
- November 8, 1932
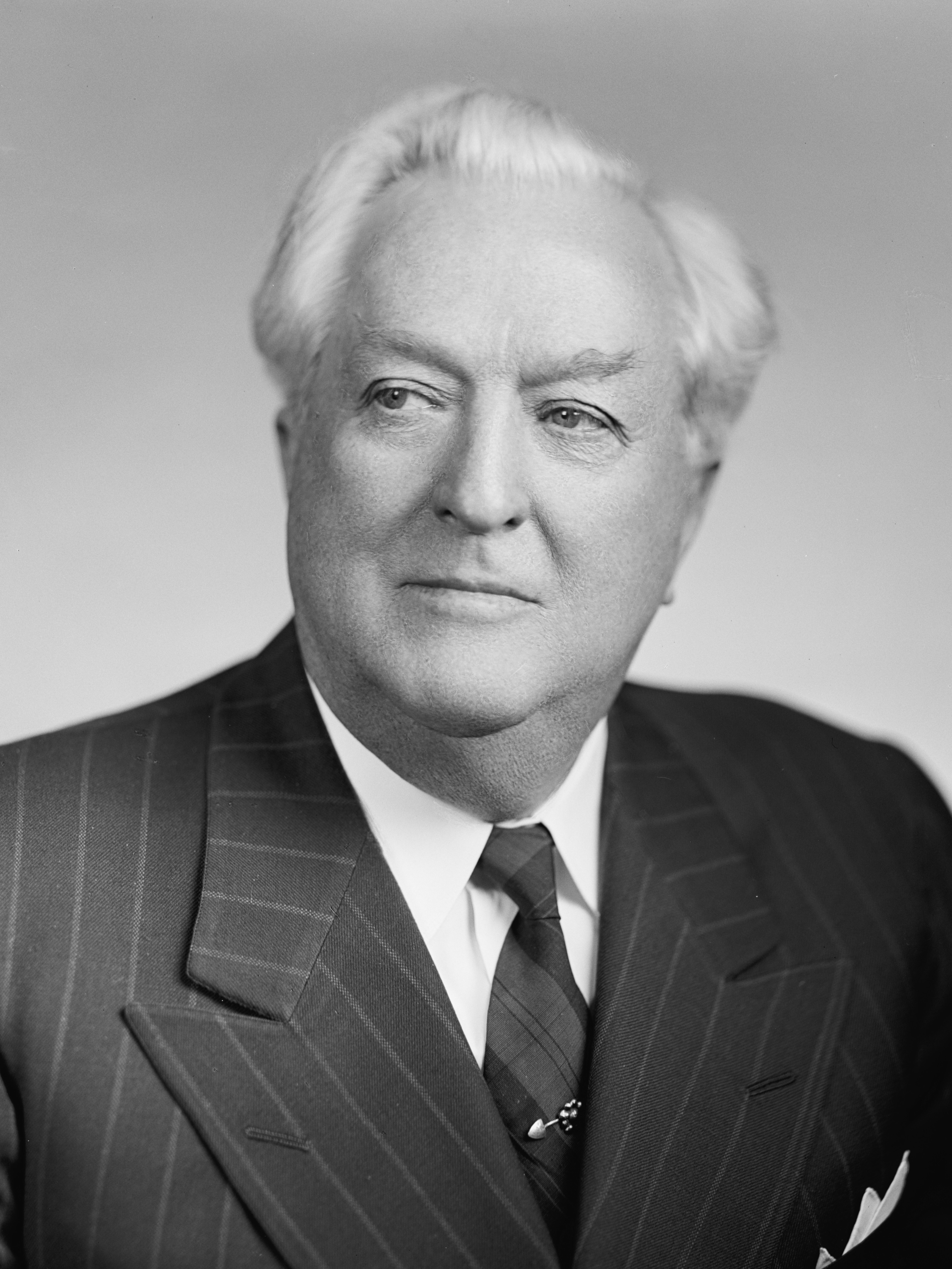

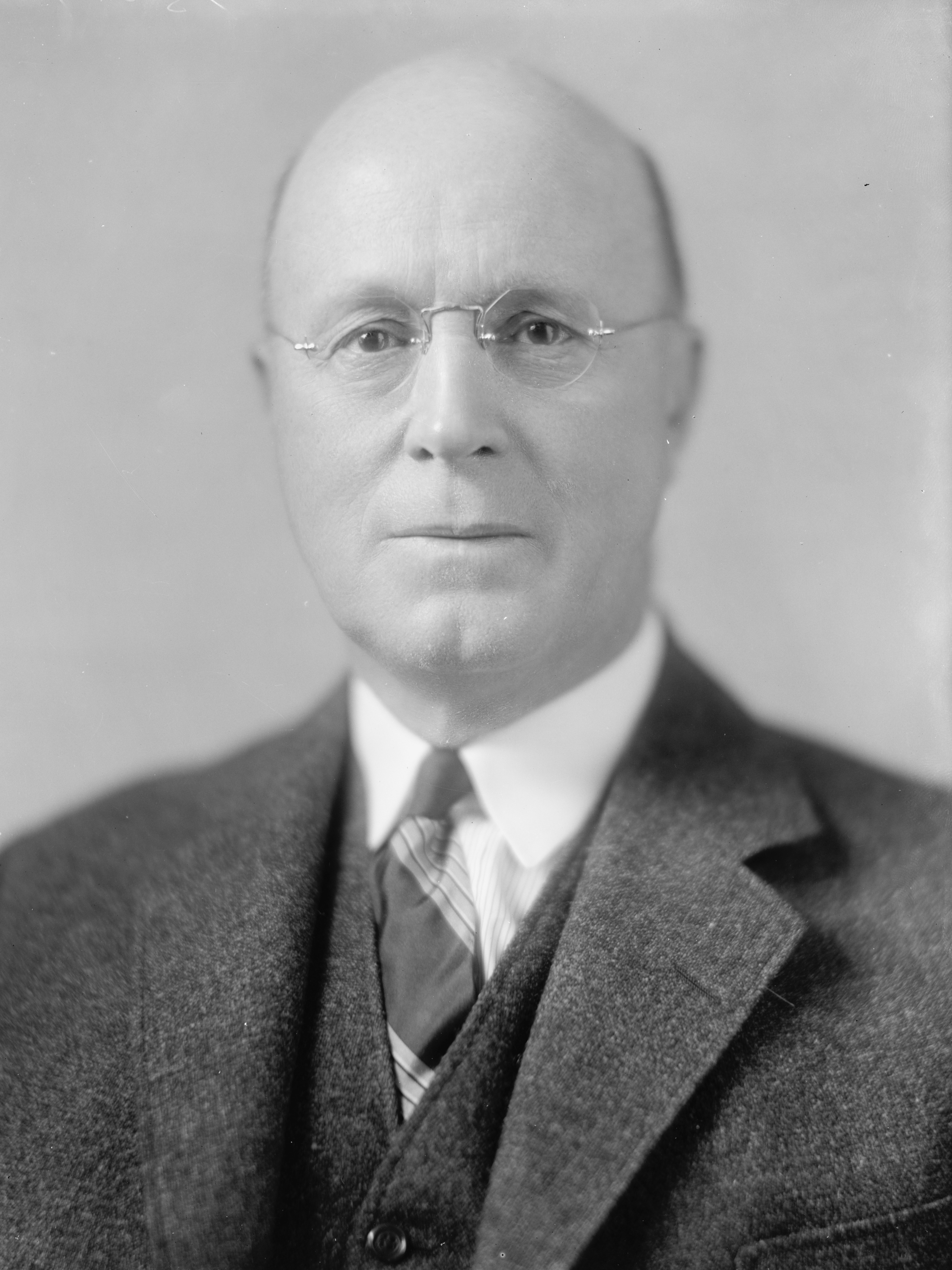
Nominee	Pat McCarran	Tasker Oddie
Party	Democratic	Republican
Popular vote	21,398	19,706
Percentage	52.06%	47.94%
- County results McCarran: 50–60% 60–70% Oddie: 50–60% 60–70%
U.S. senator before election
Tasker Oddie
Republican
Elected U.S. Senator
Pat McCarran
Democratic

Nevada election
Party	Candidate	Votes	%
Democratic	Pat McCarran	21,398	52.06%
Republican	Tasker Oddie (incumbent)	19,706	47.94%
Majority		1,692	4.12%
Turnout		41,104	
Democratic gain from Republican			

== New Hampshire ==
1932 United States Senate election in New Hampshire
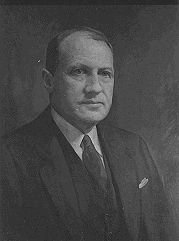

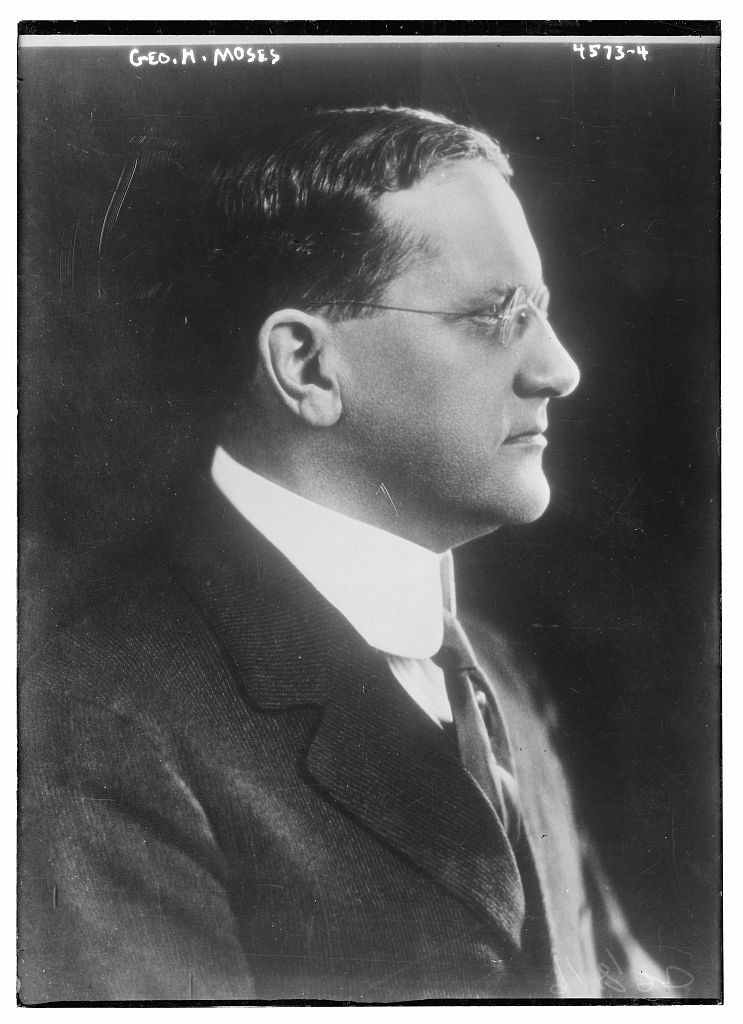
Nominee	Fred H. Brown	George H. Moses
Party	Democratic	Republican
Popular vote	98,766	96,649
Percentage	50.35%	49.27%
- Brown: 50–60% 60–70% 70–80% 80–90% 90-100% Moses: 50–60% 60–70% 70–80% 80–90% Tie: 40-50% 50%
U.S. senator before election
George H. Moses
Republican
Elected U.S. Senator
Fred H. Brown
Democratic

New Hampshire election
Party	Candidate	Votes	%
Democratic	Fred H. Brown	98,766	50.35%
Republican	George H. Moses (incumbent)	96,649	49.27%
Independent	Charles W. Greene	533	0.27%
Independent	Fred B. Chase	228	0.12%
Majority		2,117	1.08%
Turnout		196,176	
Democratic gain from Republican			

== New Jersey (special) ==
1932 United States Senate election in New Jersey
- November 8, 1932
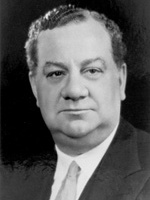

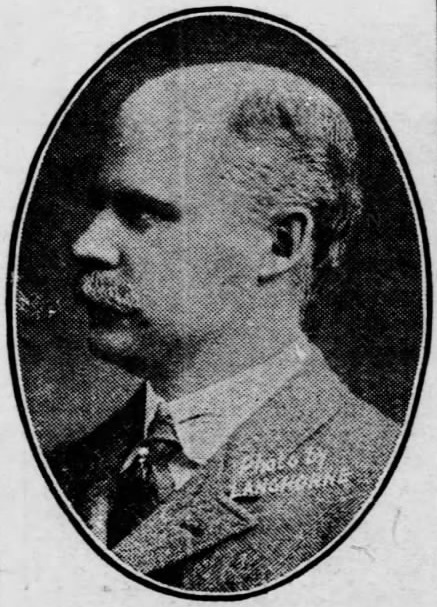
Nominee	William Warren Barbour	Percy Hamilton Stewart
Party	Republican	Democratic
Popular vote	741,734	725,511
Percentage	49.61%	48.52%
- County results Barbour: 50–60% 60–70% Stewart: 50–60% 70–80%
U.S. senator before election
W. Warren Barbour
Republican
Elected U.S. senator
W. Warren Barbour
Republican

New Jersey special election
Party	Candidate	Votes	%
Republican	W. Warren Barbour (incumbent)	741,734	49.61%
Democratic	Percy Hamilton Stewart	725,511	48.52%
Socialist	Herman F. Niessner	19,060	1.27%
Prohibition	Esther Hill Elfeth	2,966	0.20%
Communist	James L. Creekmur	2,256	0.15%
Personal Choice	Russell Y. Page	2,110	0.14%
Socialist Labor	John C. Butterworth	1,601	0.11%
Majority		16,223	1.09%
Turnout		1,495,238	
Republican hold			

== New York ==
1932 United States Senate election in New York
- November 2, 1932
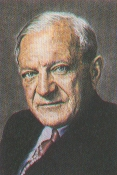

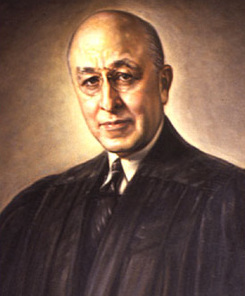
Nominee	Robert F. Wagner	George Z. Medalie
Party	Democratic	Republican
Popular vote	2,532,905	1,751,186
Percentage	55.77%	38.56%
- County results Wagner: 40–50% 50–60% 60–70% 70–80% Medalie: 40–50% 50–60% 60–70%
Senator before election
Robert F. Wagner
Democratic
Elected Senator
Robert F. Wagner
Democratic

1932 United States Senate election in New York
Party	Candidate	Votes	%
Democratic	Robert F. Wagner (incumbent)	2,532,905	55.77%
Republican	George Z. Medalie	1,751,186	38.56%
Socialist	Charles Solomon	143,282	3.16%
Prohibition	D. Leigh Colvin	74,611	1.64%
Communist	William Weinstone	29,052	0.64%
Socialist Labor	Jeremiah D. Crowley	10,328	0.23%
Total votes		4,541,364	100.00%

== North Carolina ==
=== North Carolina (special) ===
1932 United States Senate special election in North Carolina
- November 2, 1932
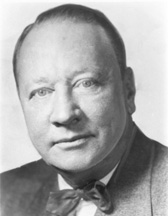

Nominee	Robert R. Reynolds	Jake F. Newell
Party	Democratic	Republican
Popular vote	485,048	221,392
Percentage	68.66%	31.34%
- Results by county Reynolds: 50–60% 60–70% 70–80% 80–90% >90% Newell: 50–60% 60–70% 70–80%
Senator before election
Robert Rice Reynolds
Democratic
Elected Senator
Robert Rice Reynolds
Democratic

Democratic former-Governor of North Carolina Cameron A. Morrison was appointed on December 13, 1930, to continue Overman's term, pending a special election. Primaries for both parties were held on June 4, 1932. Morrison lost the primary run-off election.

North Carolina special election
Party	Candidate	Votes	%
Democratic	Robert Rice Reynolds	485,048	68.66%
Republican	Jake F. Newell	221,392	31.34%
Majority		263,656	37.32%
Turnout			22.28%
Democratic hold			

Reynolds was seated December 5, 1932.

=== North Carolina (regular) ===
1932 United States Senate election in North Carolina
- November 8, 1932
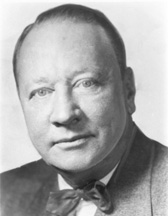

Nominee	Robert R. Reynolds	Jacob F. Newell
Party	Democratic	Republican
Popular vote	482,133	220,524
Percentage	68.62%	31.38%
Senator before election
Cameron A. Morrison
Democratic
Elected Senator
Robert Rice Reynolds
Democratic

Primaries for both parties were held on June 4, 1932 and a Democratic run-off primary was held on July 2, 1932. Interim appointee Cameron A. Morrison lost the primary run-off election.

North Carolina election
Party	Candidate	Votes	%
Democratic	Robert Rice Reynolds	482,133	68.62%
Republican	Jake F. Newell	220,524	31.38%
Majority		261,609	37.24%
Turnout		702,657	
Democratic hold			

Reynolds would be re-elected once and serve until his 1945 retirement.

== North Dakota ==
1932 United States Senate election in North Dakota
- November 6, 1932

Nominee	Gerald Nye	P. W. Lanier
Party	Republican	Democratic
Popular vote	172,796	65,612
Percentage	72.30%	27.45%
- County results Nye: 50–60% 60–70% 70–80% 80–90%
U.S. senator before election
Gerald Nye
Republican
Elected U.S. Senator
Gerald Nye
Republican

North Dakota election
Party	Candidate	Votes	%
Republican	Gerald Nye (incumbent)	172,796	72.30%
Democratic	P. W. Lanier	65,612	27.45%
Independent	Frank Witty	589	0.25%
Majority			107184%
Turnout		238,997	
Republican hold			

== Ohio ==
1932 United States Senate election in Ohio
- November 8, 1932
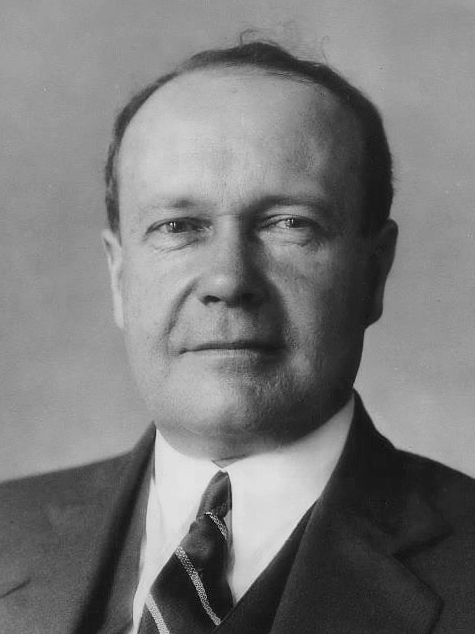

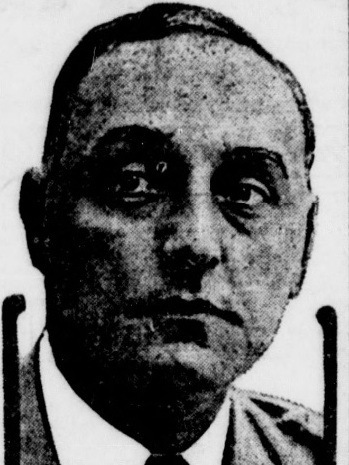
Nominee	Robert J. Bulkley	Gilbert Bettman
Party	Democratic	Republican
Popular vote	1,293,175	1,126,832
Percentage	52.53%	45.77%
U.S. senator before election
Robert J. Bulkley
Democratic
Elected U.S. Senator
Robert J. Bulkley
Democratic

Ohio election
Party	Candidate	Votes	%
Democratic	Robert J. Bulkley (incumbent)	1,293,175	52.53%
Republican	Gilbert Bettman	1,126,832	45.77%
Prohibition	Frank M. Mecartney	34,760	1.41%
Communist	I. O. Ford	7,227	0.29%
Majority		166,343	6.76%
Turnout		2,461,994	
Democratic hold			

== Oklahoma ==
1932 United States Senate election in Oklahoma
- November 8, 1932
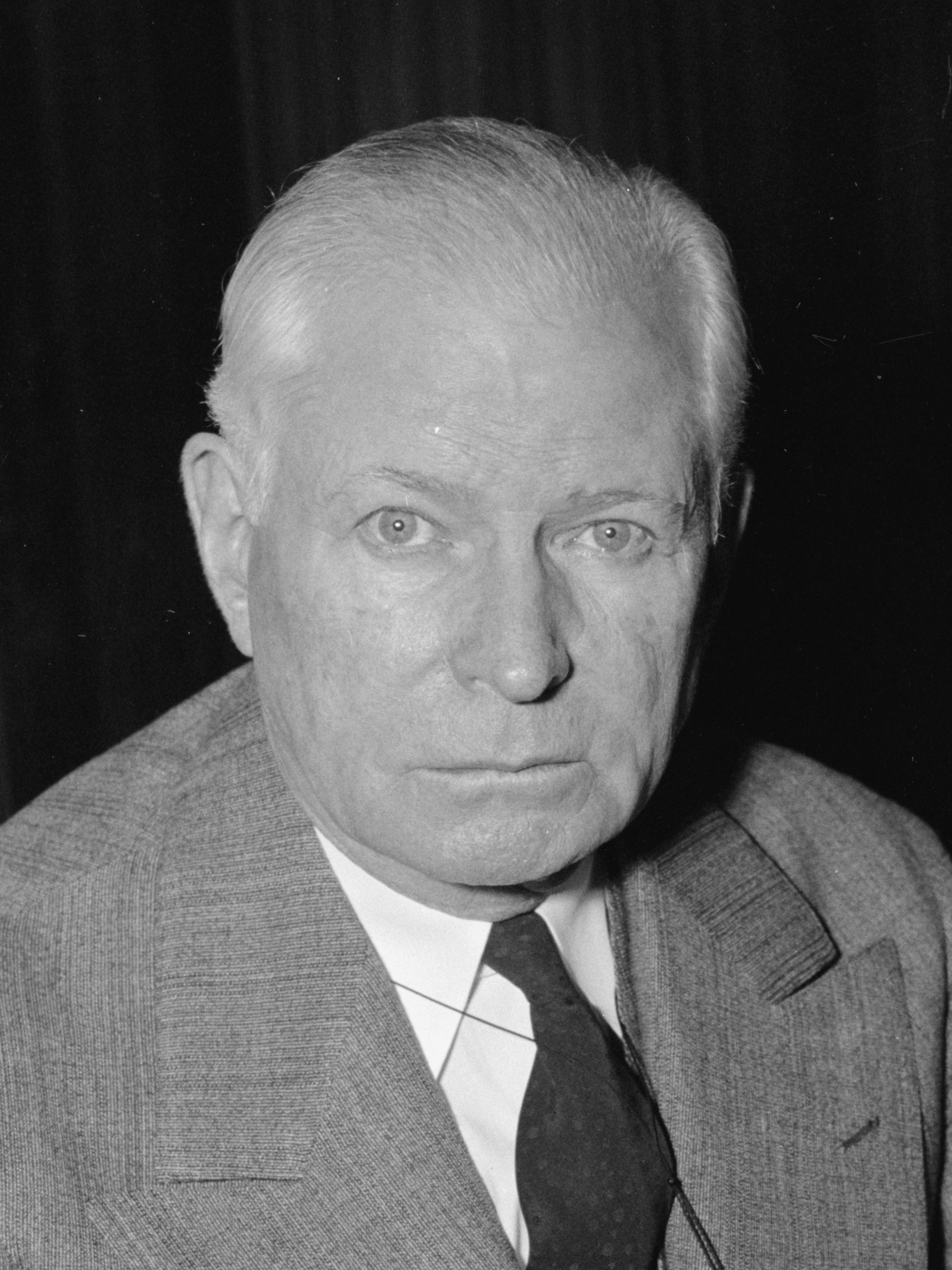

Nominee	Elmer Thomas	Wirt Franklin
Party	Democratic	Republican
Popular vote	426,130	218,854
Percentage	65.51%	33.70%
- County results Thomas: 40–50% 50–60% 60–70% 70–80% 80–90% >90% Franklin: 40–50% 50–60%
U.S. senator before election
Elmer Thomas
Democratic
Elected U.S. Senator
Elmer Thomas
Democratic

Oklahoma election
Party	Candidate	Votes	%
Democratic	Elmer Thomas (incumbent)	426,130	65.61%
Republican	Wirt Franklin	218,854	33.70%
Independent	James I. Whidden	1,395	0.21%
Independent	J. W. Houchin	1,245	0.19%
Independent	John Franing	1,061	0.16%
Independent	Thomas P. Hopley	819	0.13%
Majority		207,276	31.91%
Turnout		649,504	
Democratic hold			

== Oregon ==
1932 United States Senate election in Oregon
- November 8, 1932
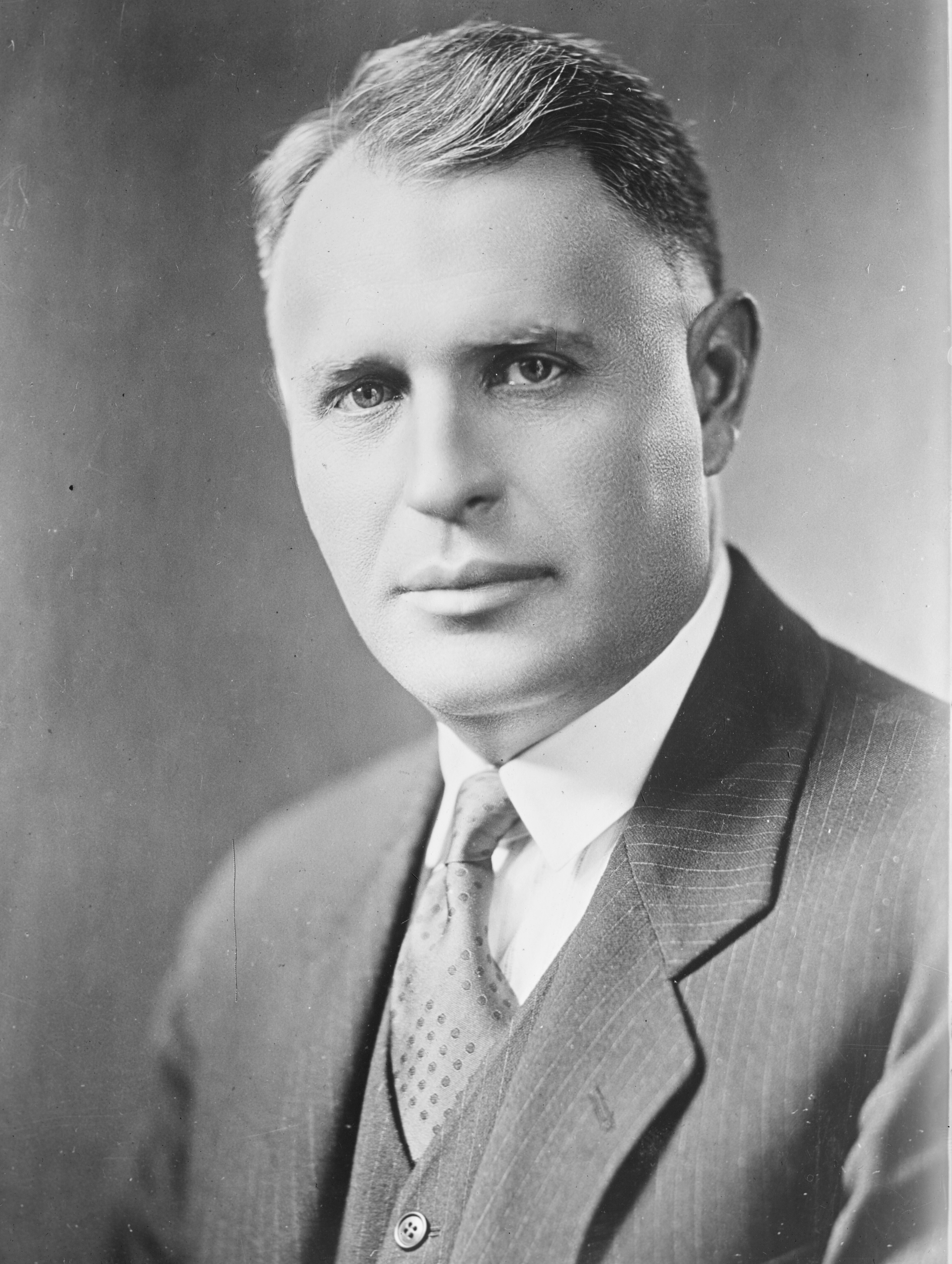

Nominee	Frederick Steiwer	Walter B. Gleason
Party	Republican	Democratic
Popular vote	186,210	137,237
Percentage	52.72%	38.86%
- County results Steiwer: 40–50% 50–60% 60–70% 70–80% Gleason: 50–60%
U.S. senator before election
Frederick Steiwer
Republican
Elected U.S. Senator
Frederick Steiwer
Republican

Oregon election
Party	Candidate	Votes	%
Republican	Frederick Steiwer (incumbent)	186,210	52.72%
Democratic	Walter B. Gleason	137,237	38.86%
Socialist	Joe A. Thomas	12,266	3.47%
Independent	F. E. Coulter	11,859	3.36%
Socialist Labor	Sverre Jacobson	3,067	0.87%
Communist	A. G. Krueger	2,555	0.72%
Majority		48,973	13.86%
Turnout		353,194	
Republican hold			

== Pennsylvania ==
1932 United States Senate election in Pennsylvania
- November 8, 1932
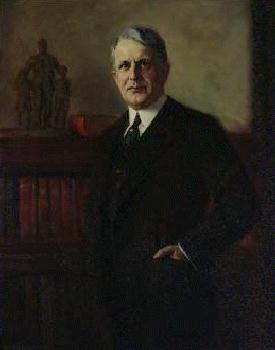

Nominee	James J. Davis	Lawrence Rupp
Party	Republican	Democratic
Popular vote	1,375,489	1,200,760
Percentage	49.46%	43.18%
- County results Davis: 30–40% 40–50% 50–60% 60–70% Rupp: 30–40% 40–50% 50–60% 60–70%
U.S. senator before election
James J. Davis
Republican
Elected U.S. Senator
James J. Davis
Republican

General election results
Party	Candidate	Votes	%	±%
Republican	James J. Davis (incumbent)	1,375,489	49.46%	
Democratic	Lawrence H. Rupp	1,200,760	43.18%	
Prohibition	Edwin J. Fithian	106,602	3.83%	
Socialist	William J. Van Essen	91,456	3.29%	
Communist	Harry M. Wicks	6,426	0.23%	
N/A	Others	145	0.01%	
Majority		174,729	6.28%	
Turnout		2,780,878		
Republican hold		Swing		

== South Carolina ==
1932 South Carolina Democratic Senate primary
- September 13, 1932
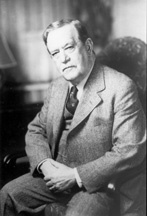

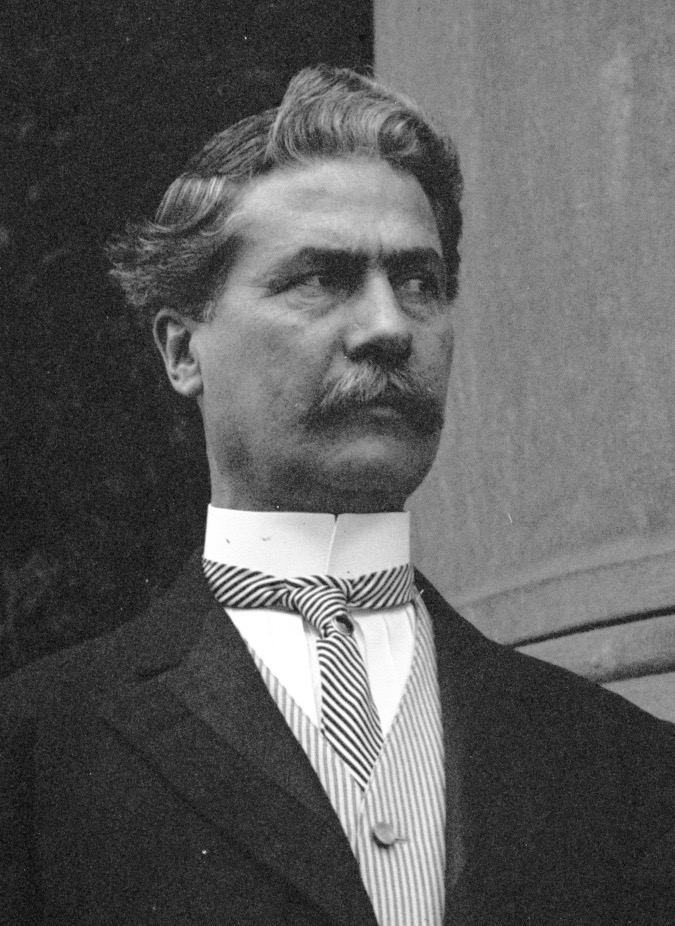
Nominee	Ellison D. Smith	Cole Blease
Party	Democratic	Democratic
Popular vote	150,468	114,840
Percentage	56.71%	43.29%
- County results Smith: 50–60% 60–70% 70–80% >90% Blease: 50–60% 60–70%
U.S. senator before election
Ellison D. Smith
Democratic
Elected U.S. Senator
Ellison D. Smith
Democratic

South Carolina U.S. Senate Election, 1932
Party	Candidate	Votes	%	±%
Democratic	Ellison D. Smith (incumbent)	104,472	98.1%	−1.9%
Republican	Clara Harrigal	1,976	1.9%	+1.9%
Majority		102,496	96.2%	−3.8%
Turnout		106,448		
Democratic hold				

== South Dakota ==
1932 United States Senate election in South Dakota
- November 8, 1932
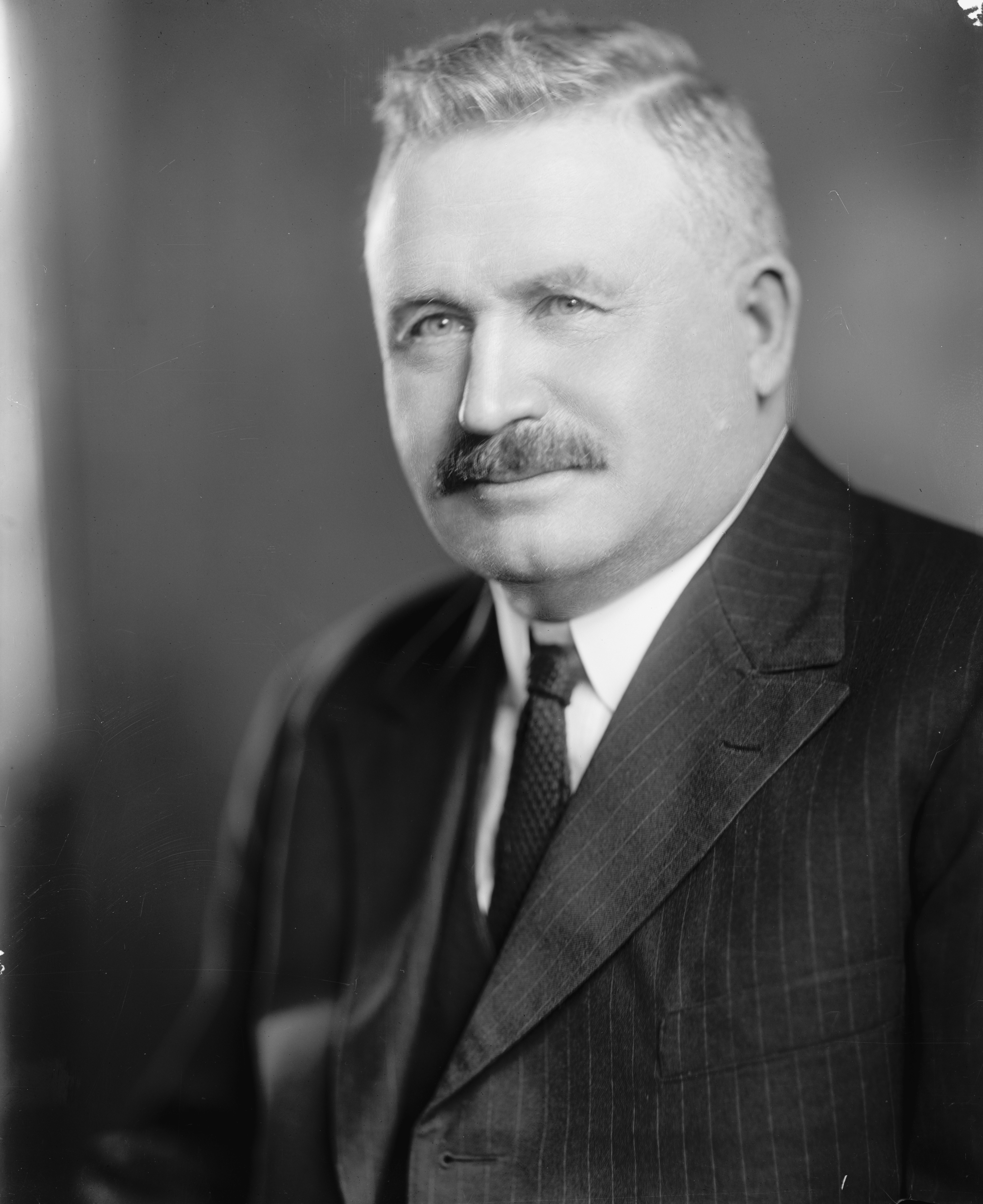

Nominee	Peter Norbeck	Ulysses Simpson Grant Cherry
Party	Republican	Democratic
Popular vote	151,845	125,731
Percentage	53.83%	44.57%
- County results Norbeck: 40–50% 50–60% 60–70% 70–80% Cherry: 40–50% 50–60% >90%
U.S. senator before election
Peter Norbeck
Republican
Elected U.S. Senator
Peter Norbeck
Republican

South Dakota election
Party	Candidate	Votes	%
Republican	Peter Norbeck (incumbent)	151,845	53.83%
Democratic	U. S. G. Cherry	125,731	44.57%
Liberty	Howard Platt	3,873	1.37%
Independent	Oscar Luttio	405	0.14%
Independent	L. J. Manbeck	238	0.08%
Majority		26,114	9.26%
Turnout		282,092	
Republican hold			

== Utah ==
1932 United States Senate election in Utah
- November 6, 1932
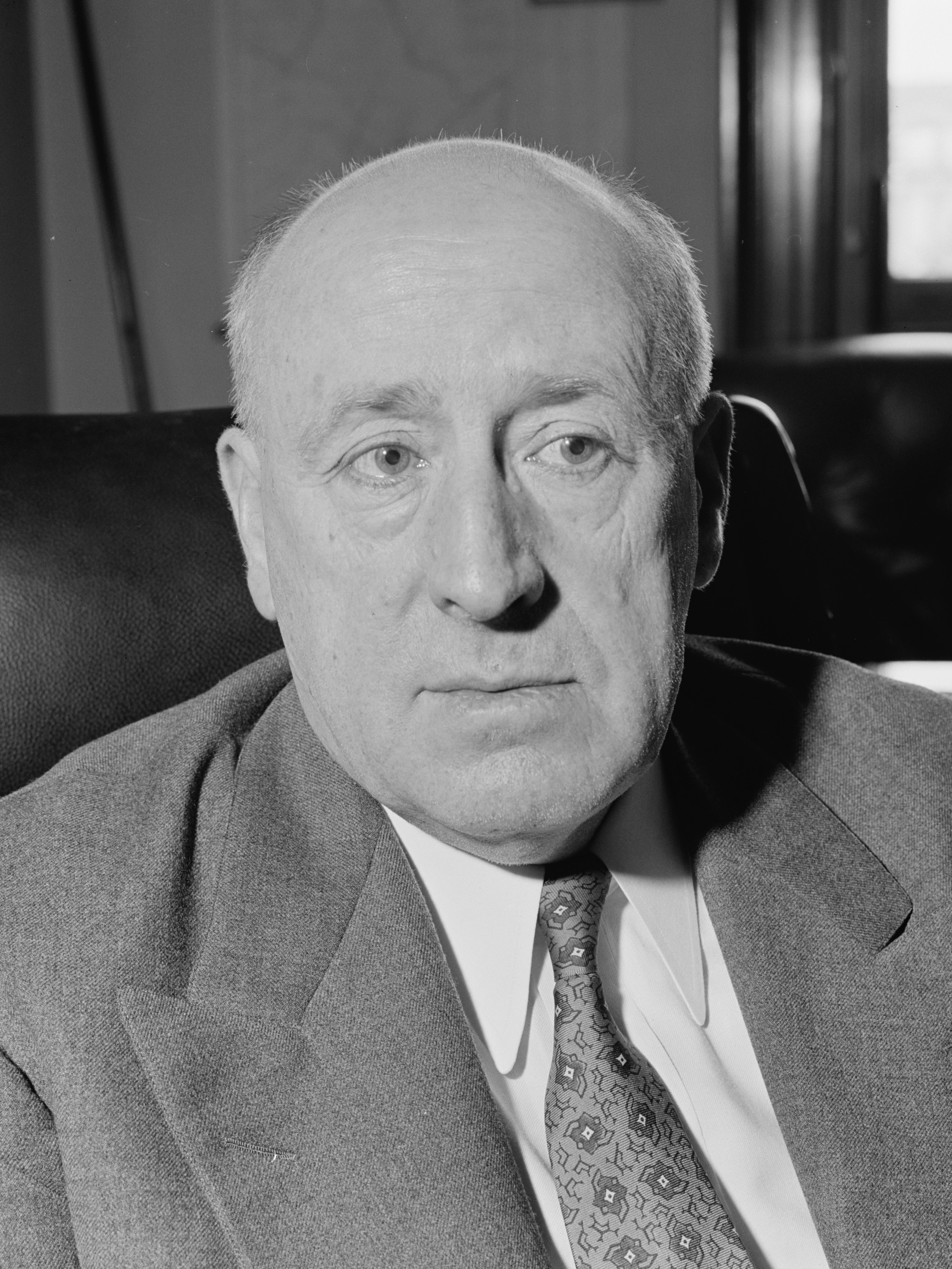

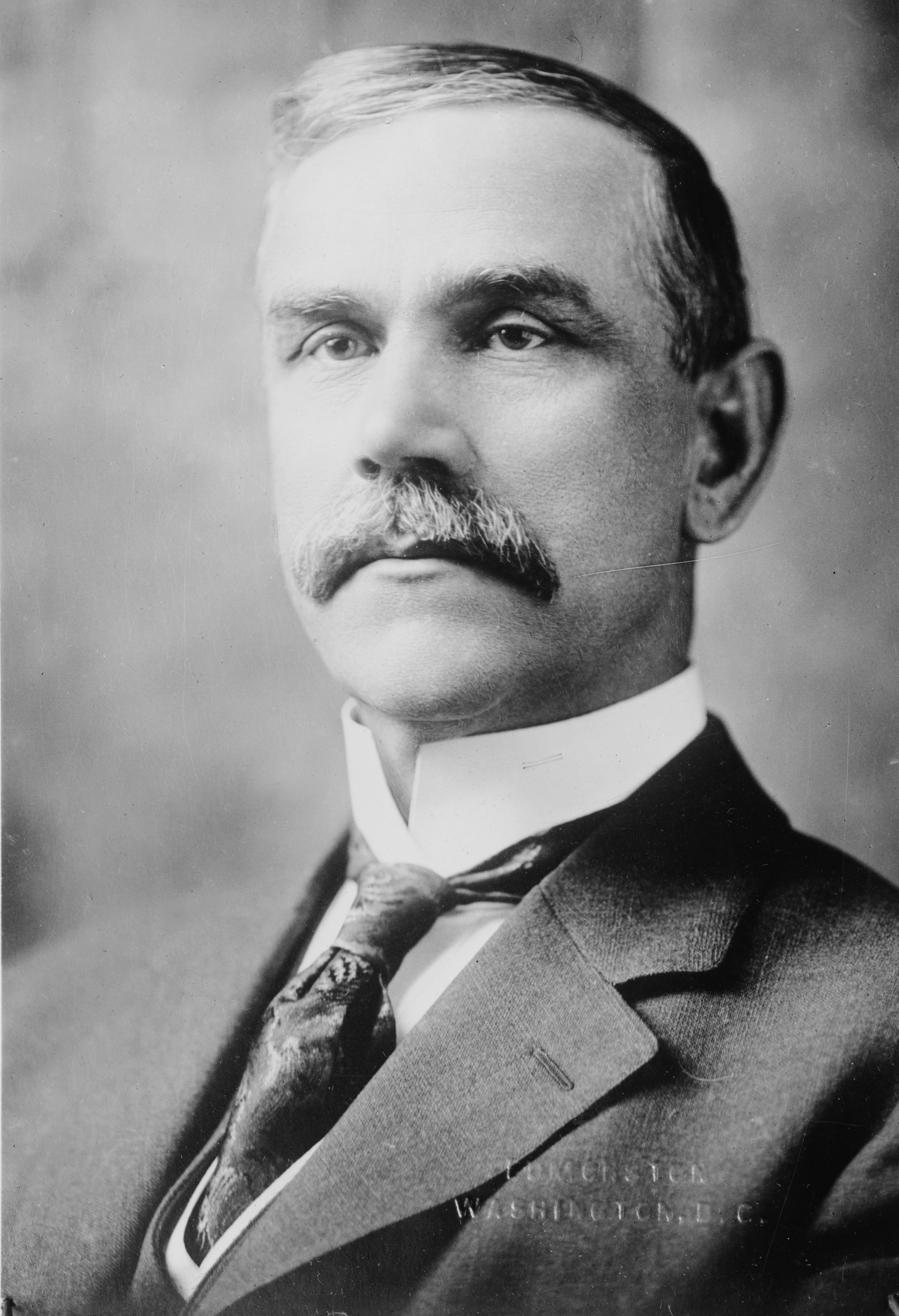
Nominee	Elbert D. Thomas	Reed Smoot
Party	Democratic	Republican
Popular vote	116,889	86,046
Percentage	56.66%	41.71%
- County results Berman: 50–60% 60–70% 70–80% Garn: 40–50% 50–60% 70–80%
U.S. senator before election
Reed Smoot
Republican
Elected U.S. Senator
Elbert D. Thomas
Democratic

Utah election
Party	Candidate	Votes	%
Democratic	Elbert D. Thomas	116,889	56.66%
Republican	Reed Smoot (incumbent)	86,046	41.71%
Socialist	John O. Watters	2,464	1.19%
Communist	Joseph E. Watts	883	0.43%
Majority		30,843	14.94%
Turnout		206,282	
Democratic gain from Republican			

== Vermont ==
1932 United States Senate Election in Vermont
- November 8, 1932
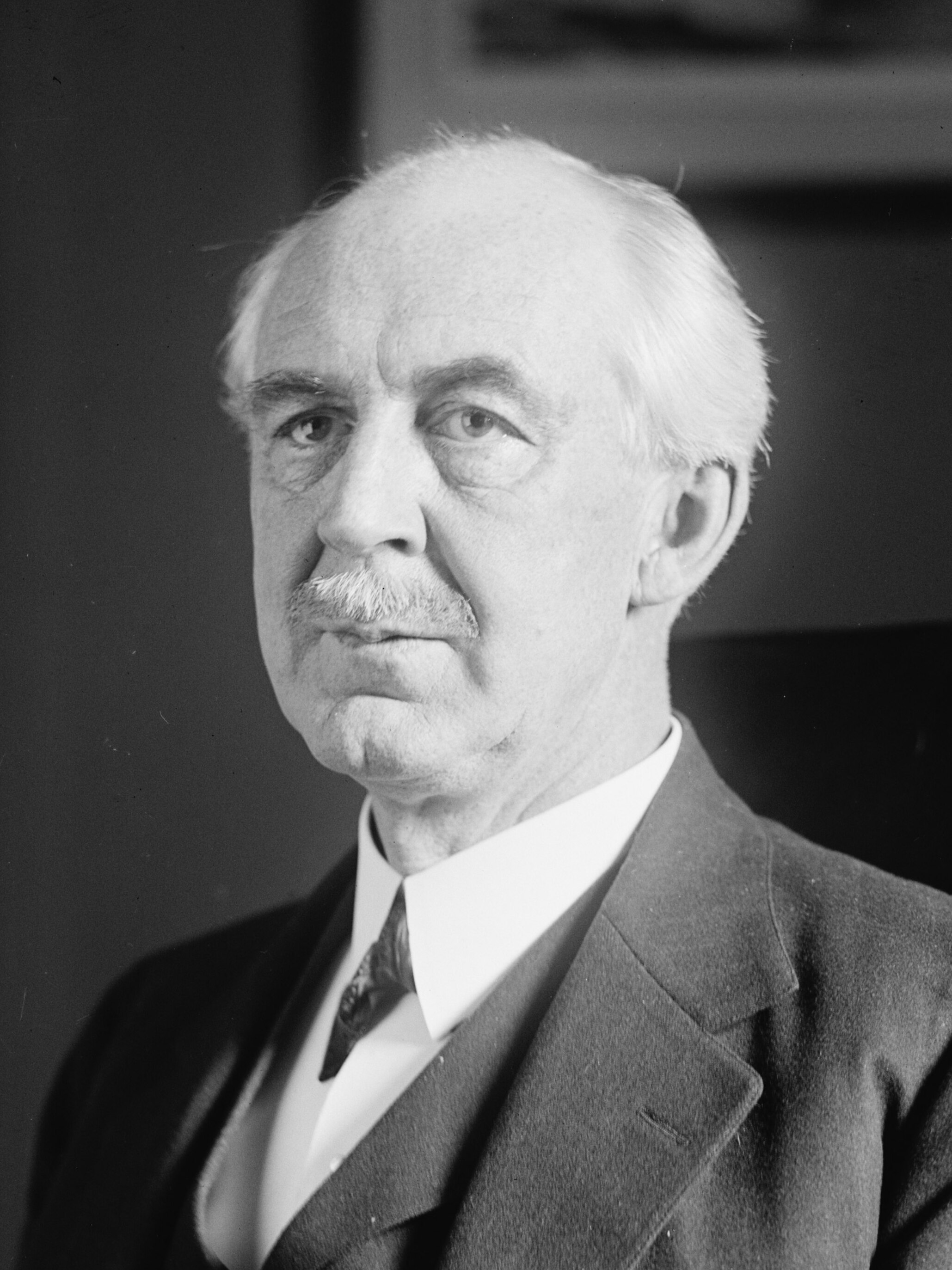

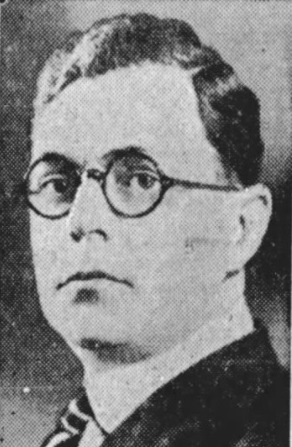
Nominee	Porter H. Dale	Fred C. Martin
Party	Republican	Democratic
Popular vote	74,319	60,455
Percentage	55.14%	44.86%
- Dale: 50–60% 60–70% 70–80% 80–90% 90–100% Martin: 50–60% 60–70% 70–80% 80–90%
U.S. senator before election
Porter H. Dale
Republican
Elected U.S. Senator
Porter H. Dale
Republican

1932 United States Senate election in Vermont
Party	Candidate	Votes	%
Republican	Porter H. Dale (incumbent)	74,319	55.1%
Democratic	Fred C. Martin	60,455	44.9%
Total votes		134,774	100.0%
Majority		13,864	10.2%
Republican hold			

== Washington ==
1932 United States Senate election in Washington
- November 8, 1932
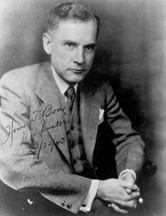

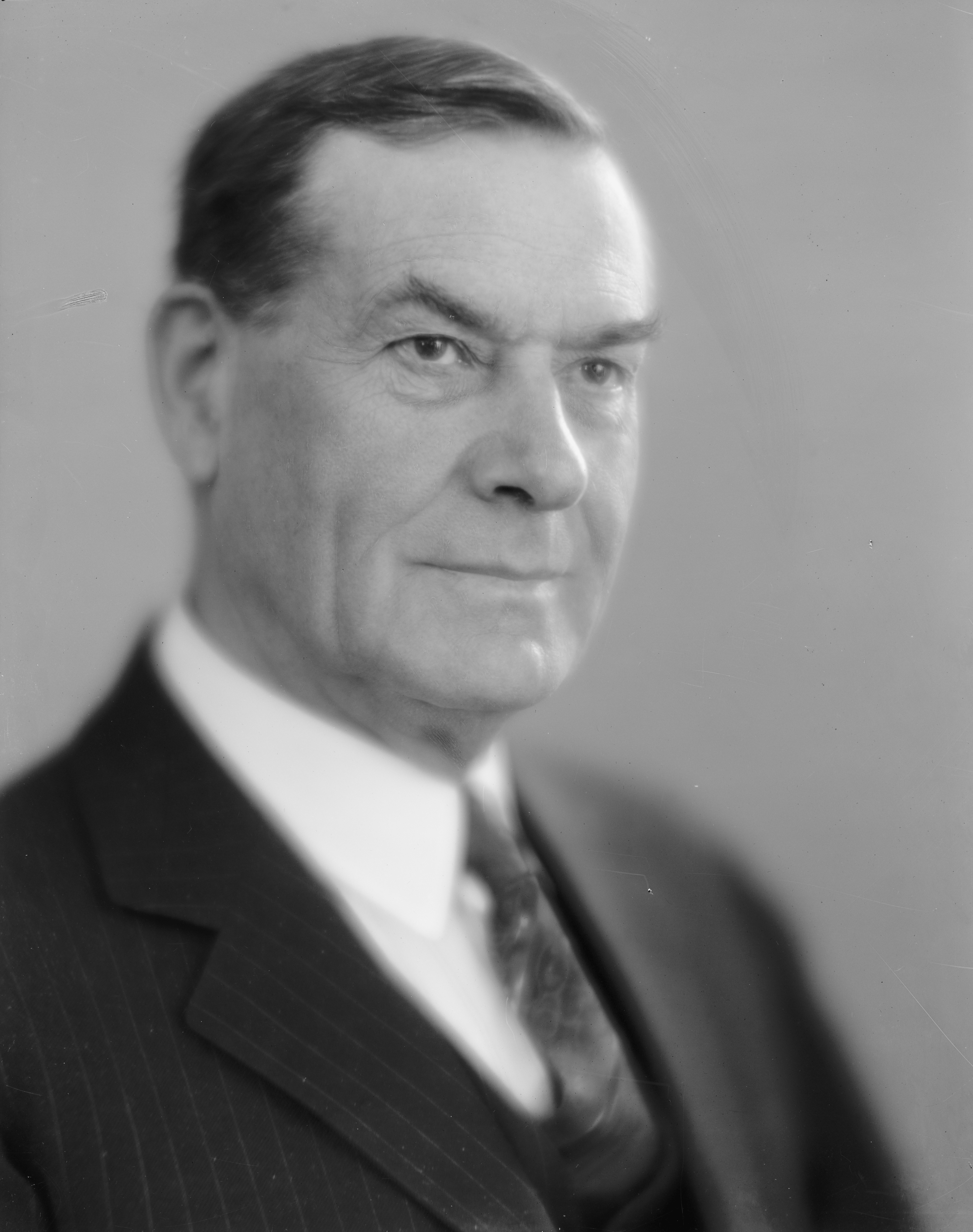
Nominee	Homer Bone	Wesley L. Jones
Party	Democratic	Republican
Popular vote	371,535	220,204
Percentage	60.61%	32.70%
- Results by county Bone: 40–50% 50–60% 60–70% 70–80%
U.S. senator before election
Wesley Livsey Jones
Republican
Elected U.S. Senator
Homer Bone (Note: Though Bone became senator-elect after the election, Jones's death left a vacancy which was filled by Elijah Sherman Grammer until Bone's term began in March.)
Democratic

Washington election
Party	Candidate	Votes	%
Democratic	Homer Bone	365,939	60.61%
Republican	Wesley Livsey Jones (incumbent)	197,450	32.70%
Liberty	Frederick R. Burch	28,859	4.78%
Socialist	Andrew T. Hunter	9,364	1.55%
Communist	Alex Noral	2,183	0.36%
Majority		168,489	27.91%
Turnout		603,795	
Democratic gain from Republican			

== Wisconsin ==
1932 United States Senate election in Wisconsin
- November 8, 1932
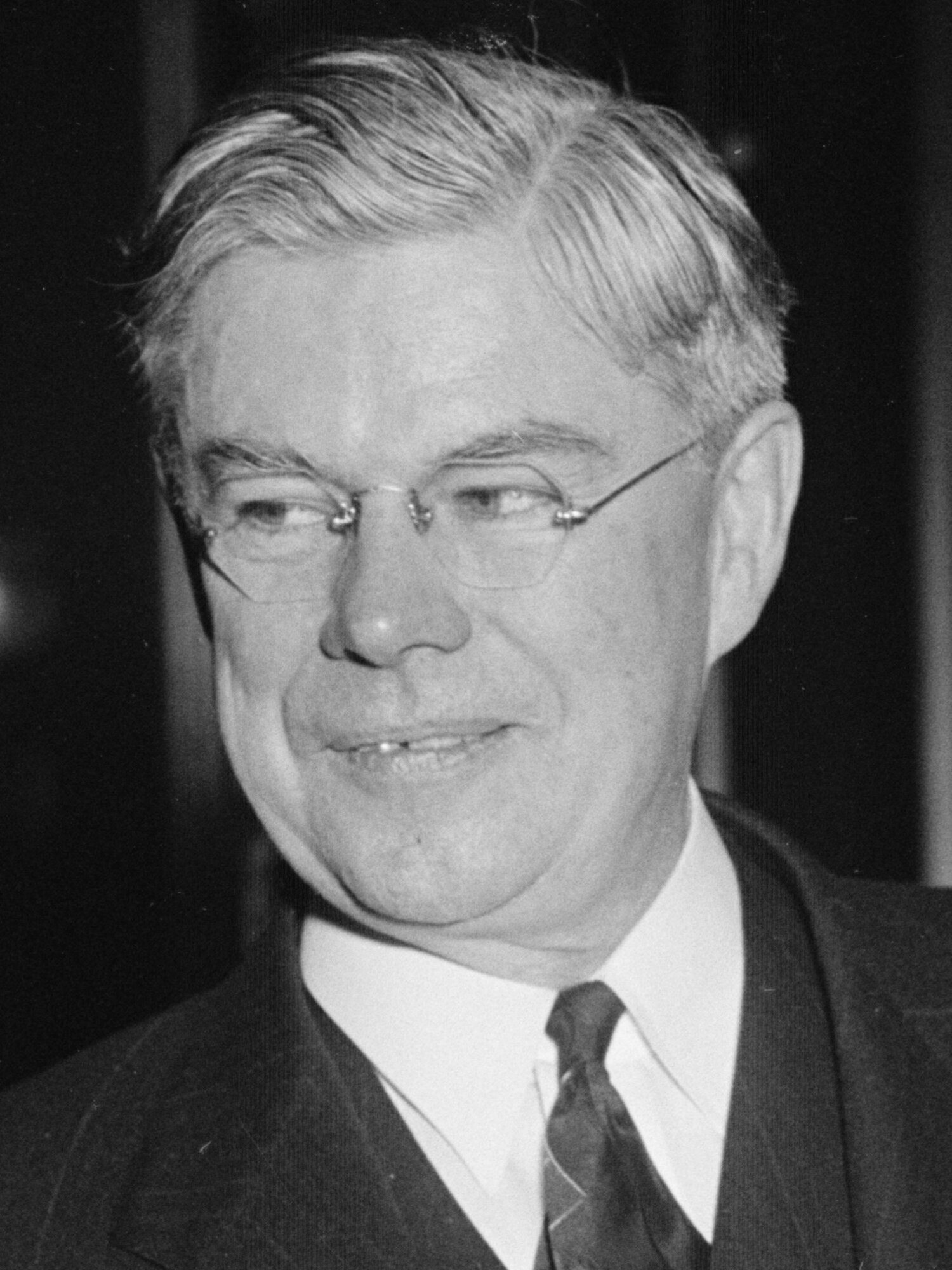

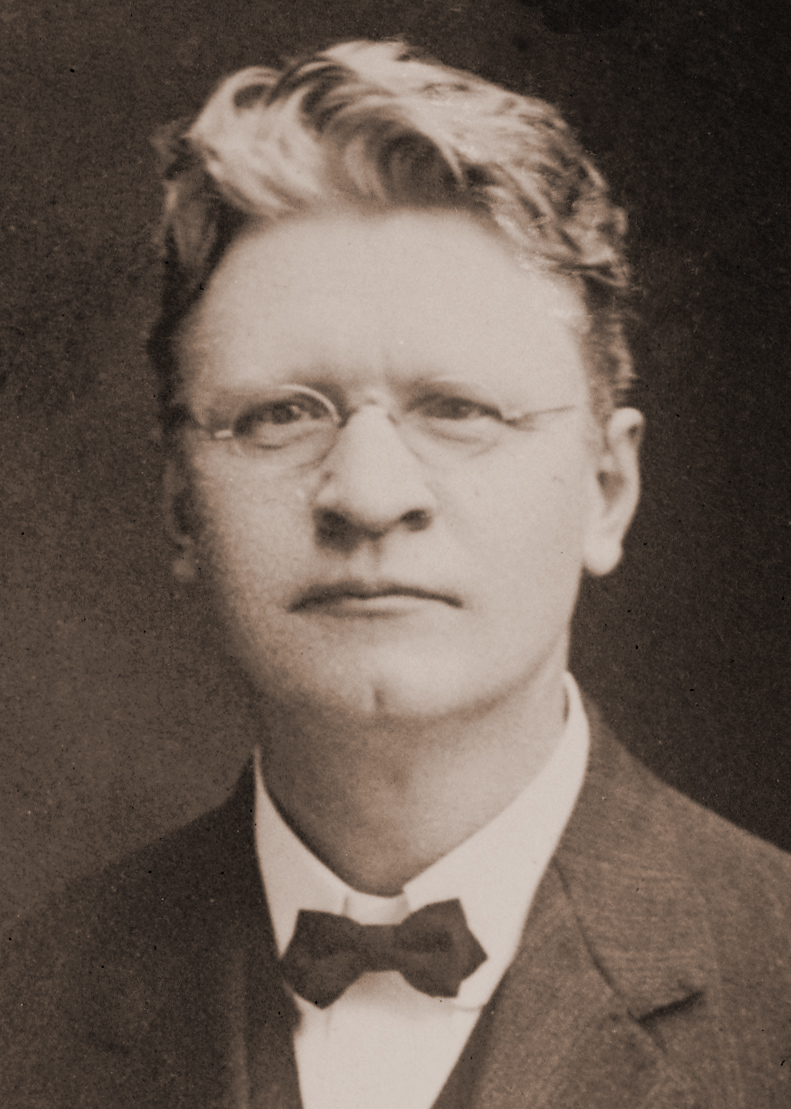
Nominee	F. Ryan Duffy	John B. Chapple	Emil Seidel
Party	Democratic	Republican	Socialist
Popular vote	610,236	387,668	65,807
Percentage	56.98%	36.20%	6.14%
- County results Duffy: 50–60% 60–70% 70–80% Chapple: 40–50% 50–60% 60–70%
U.S. senator before election
John J. Blaine
Republican
Elected U.S. Senator
F. Ryan Duffy
Democratic

Wisconsin election
Party	Candidate	Votes	%
Democratic	F. Ryan Duffy	610,236	56.97%
Republican	John B. Chapple	387,668	36.19%
Socialist	Emil Seidel	65,807	6.14%
Prohibition	Harvey A. Knapp	4,364	0.41%
Independent Communist	Ray Hansborough	2,921	0.27%
None	Scattering	69	0.00%
Majority		222,568	20.78%
Turnout		1,071,065	
Democratic gain from Republican			

== See also ==
- 1932 United States elections
  - 1932 United States presidential election
  - 1932 United States House of Representatives elections
- 72nd United States Congress
- 73rd United States Congress
