= 1968 United States Senate elections =

- November 5, 1968
- Class 3

34 of the 100 seats in the United States Senate 51 seats needed for a majority
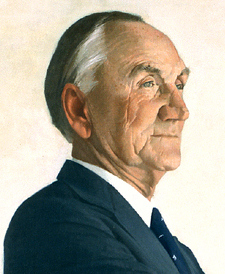

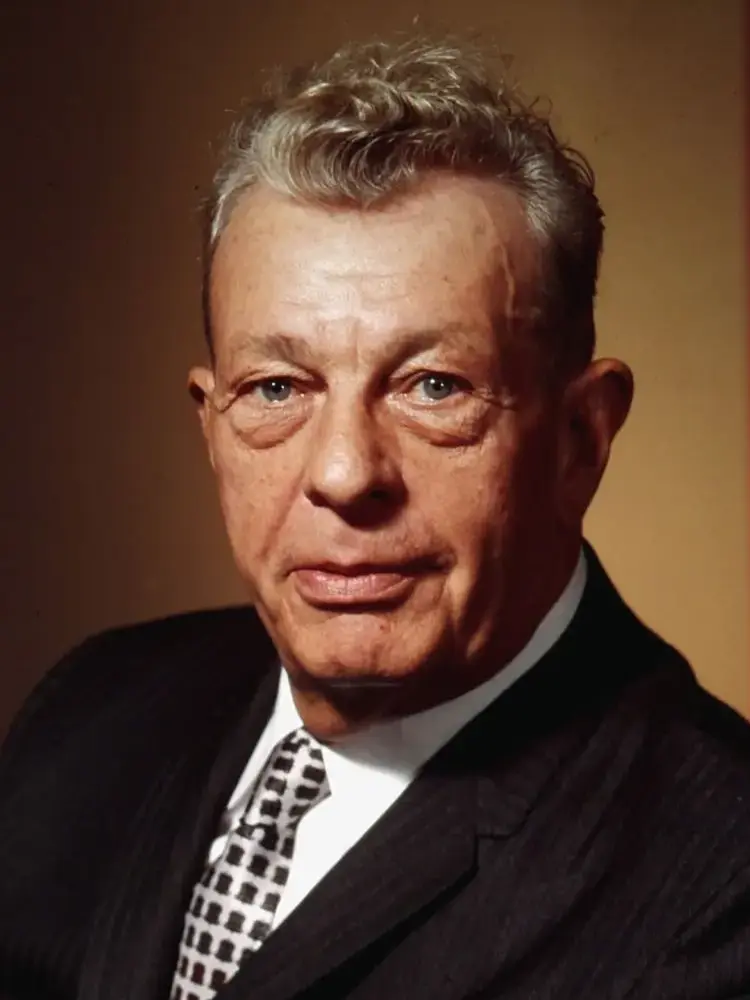
	Majority party	Minority party
Leader	Mike Mansfield	Everett Dirksen
Party	Democratic	Republican
Leader since	January 3, 1961	January 3, 1959
Leader's seat	Montana	Illinois
Seats before	63	37
Seats after	58 (Note: Reflecting the result of the November 1968 elections, only. Following those elections, upon the death of Alaska Democratic Senator Bob Bartlett and subsequent appointment of Republican Ted Stevens, the partisan balance at the beginning of the 91st United States Congress stood at 57–43 in favor of the Democrats.)	42
Seat change	▼5	▲5
Popular vote	24,976,660	23,588,832 (Note: The Liberal Party in New York nominated Jacob Javits, a Republican, but the Clerk of the U.S. House of Representatives did not tabulate their votes, totaling 458,936, into the national Republican total.)
Percentage	49.3%	46.5%
Seats up	23	11
Races won	18	16
- Results of the elections: Democratic gain Democratic hold Republican gain Republican hold No election
Majority Leader before election
Mike Mansfield
Democratic
Elected Majority Leader
Mike Mansfield
Democratic

The 1968 United States Senate elections were elections for the United States Senate. Held on November 5, the 34 seats of Class 3 were contested in regular elections. They coincided with the presidential election of the same year. The Republicans picked up five net seats in the Senate. This saw Republicans win a Senate seat in Florida for the first time since the Reconstruction era.

Republicans would gain another seat after the election when Alaska Republican Ted Stevens was appointed to replace Democrat Bob Bartlett, reducing Democrats' majority to 57–43.

== Results summary ==
↓
58	42
Democratic	Republican

Parties					Total
Parties	Democratic	Republican	Conservative	Other	Total
Last elections (1966)	64	36	0	0	100
Before these elections	63	37	0	0	100
Not up	40	26	0	0	66
Up Class 3 (1962→1968)	23	11	0	0	34
Incumbent retired	3	3	—	—	6
Held by same party	1	2	—	—	3
Replaced by other party	▼1 Republican replaced by ▲1 Democrat ▼2 Democrats replaced by ▲2 Republicans		—	—	3
Result	2	4	0	0	6
Incumbent ran	20	8	—	—	28
Won re-election	13	7	—	—	20
Lost re-election	▼4 Democrats replaced by ▲4 Republicans		—	—	4
Lost renomination, but held by same party	2	0	—	—	2
Lost renomination, and party lost	▼1 Republican replaced by ▲1 Democrat ▼1 Democrat replaced by ▲1 Republican		—	—	2
Result	16	12	0	0	28
Total elected	18	16	0	0	34
Net gain/loss	▼5	▲5	Steady	Steady	5
Nationwide vote	24,976,660	23,588,832	1,139,402	989,058	50,693,952
Share	49.27%	46.53%	2.25%	1.95%	100%
Result	58	42	0	0	100

Source: Clerk of the U.S. House of Representatives

== Gains, losses, and holds ==
=== Retirements ===
Three Republicans and three Democrats retired instead of seeking re-election.

State	Senator	Replaced by
Alabama	J. Lister Hill	James Allen
Arizona	Carl Hayden	Barry Goldwater
Florida	George Smathers	Edward Gurney
Iowa	Bourke B. Hickenlooper	Harold Hughes
Kansas	Frank Carlson	Bob Dole
Kentucky	Thruston Ballard Morton	Marlow Cook

=== Defeats ===
One Republican and seven Democrats sought re-election but lost in the primary or general election.

State	Senator	Replaced by
Alaska	Ernest Gruening	Mike Gravel
California	Thomas Kuchel	Alan Cranston
Maryland	Daniel Brewster	Charles Mathias
Missouri	Edward V. Long	Thomas Eagleton
Ohio	Frank Lausche	William B. Saxbe
Oklahoma	Mike Monroney	Henry Bellmon
Oregon	Wayne Morse	Bob Packwood
Pennsylvania	Joseph S. Clark Jr.	Richard Schweiker

=== Post-election changes ===
One Democrat died on December 11, 1968, and a Republican was appointed on December 24, 1968.

State	Senator	Replaced by
Alaska (Class 2)	Bob Bartlett	Ted Stevens
Illinois (Class 3)	Everett Dirksen	Ralph Tyler Smith

== Change in composition ==
=== Before the elections ===
After the September 10, 1968 appointment in New York.

D_{1}	D_{2}	D_{3}	D_{4}	D_{5}	D_{6}	D_{7}	D_{8}	D_{9}	D_{10}
D_{20}	D_{19}	D_{18}	D_{17}	D_{16}	D_{15}	D_{14}	D_{13}	D_{12}	D_{11}
D_{21}	D_{22}	D_{23}	D_{24}	D_{25}	D_{26}	D_{27}	D_{28}	D_{29}	D_{30}
D_{40}	D_{39}	D_{38}	D_{37}	D_{36}	D_{35}	D_{34}	D_{33}	D_{32}	D_{31}
D_{41} Ala. Retired	D_{42} Ak. (cl. 3); Ran	D_{43} Ariz. Retired	D_{44} Ark. Ran	D_{45} Conn. Ran	D_{46} Fla. Retired	D_{47} Ga. Ran	D_{48} Hawaii; Ran	D_{49} Idaho; Ran	D_{50} Ind. Ran
Majority →									D_{51} La. Ran
D_{60} S.C. Ran	D_{59} Pa. Ran	D_{58} Ore. Ran	D_{57} Okla. Ran	D_{56} Ohio; Ran	D_{55} N.C. Ran	D_{54} Nev. Ran	D_{53} Mo. Ran	D_{52} Md. Ran	D_{51} La. Ran
D_{61} S.D. Ran	D_{62} Wash. Ran	D_{63} Wisc. Ran	R_{37} Vt. Ran	R_{36} Utah; Ran	R_{35} N.D. Ran	R_{34} N.Y. (cl. 3); Ran	R_{33} N.H. Ran	R_{32} Ky. Ran	R_{31} Kan. Retired
R_{21}	R_{22}	R_{23}	R_{24}	R_{25}	R_{26}	R_{27} Calif. Ran	R_{28} Colo. Ran	R_{29} Ill. Ran	R_{30} Iowa; Retired
R_{20}	R_{19}	R_{18}	R_{17}	R_{16}	R_{15}	R_{14}	R_{13}	R_{12}	R_{11}
R_{1} N.Y. (cl. 1); Gain	R_{2}	R_{3}	R_{4}	R_{5}	R_{6}	R_{7}	R_{8}	R_{9}	R_{10}

=== After the general elections ===
D_{1}	D_{2}	D_{3}	D_{4}	D_{5}	D_{6}	D_{7}	D_{8}	D_{9}	D_{10}
D_{20}	D_{19}	D_{18}	D_{17}	D_{16}	D_{15}	D_{14}	D_{13}	D_{12}	D_{11}
D_{21}	D_{22}	D_{23}	D_{24}	D_{25}	D_{26}	D_{27}	D_{28}	D_{29}	D_{30}
D_{40}	D_{39}	D_{38}	D_{37}	D_{36}	D_{35}	D_{34}	D_{33}	D_{32}	D_{31}
D_{41} Ala. Hold	D_{42} Ak. (cl. 3); Hold	D_{43} Ark. Re-elected	D_{44} Conn. Re-elected	D_{45} Ga. Re-elected	D_{46} Hawaii; Re-elected	D_{47} Idaho; Re-elected	D_{48} Ind. Re-elected	D_{49} La. Re-elected	D_{50} Mo. Hold
Majority →									D_{51} Nev. Re-elected
R_{41} Ore. Gain	R_{42} Pa. Gain	D_{58} Iowa; Gain	D_{57} Calif. Gain	D_{56} Wisc. Re-elected	D_{55} Wash. Re-elected	D_{54} S.D. Re-elected	D_{53} S.C. Re-elected	D_{52} N.C. Re-elected	D_{51} Nev. Re-elected
R_{40} Okla. Gain	R_{39} Ohio; Gain	R_{38} Md. Gain	R_{37} Fla. Gain	R_{36} Ariz. Gain	R_{35} Vt. Re-elected	R_{34} Utah; Re-elected	R_{33} N.D. Re-elected	R_{32} N.Y. (cl. 3); Re-elected	R_{31} N.H. Re-elected
R_{21}	R_{22}	R_{23}	R_{24}	R_{25}	R_{26}	R_{27} Colo. Re-elected	R_{28} Ill. Re-elected	R_{29} Kan. Hold	R_{30} Ky. Hold
R_{20}	R_{19}	R_{18}	R_{17}	R_{16}	R_{15}	R_{14}	R_{13}	R_{12}	R_{11}
R_{1}	R_{2}	R_{3}	R_{4}	R_{5}	R_{6}	R_{7}	R_{8}	R_{9}	R_{10}

=== Beginning of the next Congress ===
D_{1}	D_{2}	D_{3}	D_{4}	D_{5}	D_{6}	D_{7}	D_{8}	D_{9}	D_{10}
D_{20}	D_{19}	D_{18}	D_{17}	D_{16}	D_{15}	D_{14}	D_{13}	D_{12}	D_{11}
D_{21}	D_{22}	D_{23}	D_{24}	D_{25}	D_{26}	D_{27}	D_{28}	D_{29}	D_{30}
D_{40}	D_{39}	D_{38}	D_{37}	D_{36}	D_{35}	D_{34}	D_{33}	D_{32}	D_{31}
D_{41}	D_{42}	D_{43}	D_{44}	D_{45}	D_{46}	D_{47}	D_{48}	D_{49}	D_{50}
Majority →									D_{51}
R_{41}	R_{42}	R_{43} Ak. (cl. 2); Gain	D_{57}	D_{56}	D_{55}	D_{54}	D_{53}	D_{52}	D_{51}
R_{40}	R_{39}	R_{38}	R_{37}	R_{36}	R_{35}	R_{34}	R_{33}	R_{32}	R_{31}
R_{21}	R_{22}	R_{23}	R_{24}	R_{25}	R_{26}	R_{27}	R_{28}	R_{29}	R_{30}
R_{20}	R_{19}	R_{18}	R_{17}	R_{16}	R_{15}	R_{14}	R_{13}	R_{12}	R_{11}
R_{1}	R_{2}	R_{3}	R_{4}	R_{5}	R_{6}	R_{7}	R_{8}	R_{9}	R_{10}

Key:	D_{#} / Democratic; R_{#} / Republican

== Race summary ==
=== Elections leading to the next Congress ===
In these general elections, the winners were elected for the term beginning January 3, 1969; ordered by state.

All of the elections involved the Class 3 seats.

State (linked to summaries below)	Incumbent			Results	Candidates
State (linked to summaries below)	Senator	Party	Electoral history	Results	Candidates
Alabama	J. Lister Hill	Democratic	1938 (Appointed); 1938; 1944; 1950; 1956; 1962	Incumbent retired. Democratic hold.	▌ ✓ James Allen (Democratic) 70.0%; ▌Perry Hooper Sr. (Republican) 22.1%; ▌Robert Schwenn (Independent) 8.0%
Alaska	Ernest Gruening	Democratic	1958; 1962	Incumbent lost renomination, then ran as a write-in candidate but lost re-election. Democratic hold.	▌ ✓ Mike Gravel (Democratic) 45.1%; ▌Elmer E. Rasmuson (Republican) 37.4%; ▌Ernest Gruening (Democratic Write-In) 17.4%
Arizona	Carl Hayden	Democratic	1926; 1932; 1938; 1944; 1950; 1956; 1962	Incumbent retired. Republican gain.	▌ ✓ Barry Goldwater (Republican) 57.2%; ▌Roy Elson (Democratic) 42.8%
Arkansas	J. William Fulbright	Democratic	1944; 1950; 1956; 1962	Incumbent re-elected.	▌ ✓ J. William Fulbright (Democratic) 59.2%; ▌Charles T. Bernard (Republican) 40.9%
California	Thomas Kuchel	Republican	1953 (Appointed); 1954 (special); 1956; 1962	Incumbent lost renomination. Democratic gain.	▌ ✓ Alan Cranston (Democratic) 51.8%; ▌Max Rafferty (Republican) 46.9%; ▌Paul Jacobs (Peace and Freedom) 1.3%
Colorado	Peter H. Dominick	Republican	1962	Incumbent re-elected.	▌ ✓ Peter H. Dominick (Republican) 58.6%; ▌Stephen McNichols (Democratic) 41.5%
Connecticut	Abraham Ribicoff	Democratic	1962	Incumbent re-elected.	▌ ✓ Abraham Ribicoff (Democratic) 54.3%; ▌Edwin H. May Jr. (Republican) 45.7%
Florida	George Smathers	Democratic	1950; 1956; 1962	Incumbent retired. Republican gain.	▌ ✓ Edward Gurney (Republican) 55.9%; ▌LeRoy Collins (Democratic) 44.1%
Georgia	Herman Talmadge	Democratic	1956; 1962	Incumbent re-elected.	▌ ✓ Herman Talmadge (Democratic) 77.5%; ▌E. Earl Patton (Republican) 22.5%
Hawaii	Daniel Inouye	Democratic	1962	Incumbent re-elected.	▌ ✓ Daniel Inouye (Democratic) 83.4%; ▌Wayne C. Thiessen (Republican) 15.0%
Idaho	Frank Church	Democratic	1956; 1962	Incumbent re-elected.	▌ ✓ Frank Church (Democratic) 60.3%; ▌George V. Hansen (Republican) 39.7%
Illinois	Everett Dirksen	Republican	1950; 1956; 1962	Incumbent re-elected.	▌ ✓ Everett Dirksen (Republican) 53.0%; ▌William G. Clark (Democratic) 46.6%
Indiana	Birch Bayh	Democratic	1962	Incumbent re-elected.	▌ ✓ Birch Bayh (Democratic) 51.7%; ▌William Ruckelshaus (Republican) 48.2%
Iowa	Bourke B. Hickenlooper	Republican	1944; 1950; 1956; 1962	Incumbent retired. Democratic gain.	▌ ✓ Harold Hughes (Democratic) 50.3%; ▌David M. Stanley (Republican) 49.7%
Kansas	Frank Carlson	Republican	1950 (special); 1950; 1956; 1962	Incumbent retired. Republican hold.	▌ ✓ Bob Dole (Republican) 60.1%; ▌William I. Robinson (Democratic) 38.7%
Kentucky	Thruston Ballard Morton	Republican	1956; 1962	Incumbent retired. Republican hold. Incumbent resigned December 16, 1968 to give successor preferential seniority. Winner appointed December 17, 1968.	▌ ✓ Marlow Cook (Republican) 51.4%; ▌Katherine Peden (Democratic) 47.6%
Louisiana	Russell B. Long	Democratic	1948 (special); 1950; 1956; 1962	Incumbent re-elected.	▌ ✓ Russell B. Long (Democratic); Unopposed
Maryland	Daniel Brewster	Democratic	1962	Incumbent lost re-election. Republican gain.	▌ ✓ Charles Mathias (Republican) 47.8%; ▌Daniel Brewster (Democratic) 39.1%; ▌George P. Mahoney (American Independent) 13.1%
Missouri	Edward V. Long	Democratic	1960 (Appointed); 1960 (special); 1962	Incumbent lost renomination. Democratic hold. Incumbent resigned December 27, 1968 to give successor preferential seniority. Winner appointed December 28, 1968.	▌ ✓ Thomas Eagleton (Democratic) 51.1%; ▌Thomas B. Curtis (Republican) 48.9%
Nevada	Alan Bible	Democratic	1954 (special); 1956; 1962	Incumbent re-elected.	▌ ✓ Alan Bible (Democratic) 54.8%; ▌Edward Fike (Republican) 45.2%
New Hampshire	Norris Cotton	Republican	1954 (special); 1956; 1962	Incumbent re-elected.	▌ ✓ Norris Cotton (Republican) 59.3%; ▌John W. King (Democratic) 40.7%
New York	Jacob Javits	Republican	1956; 1962	Incumbent re-elected.	▌ ✓ Jacob Javits (Republican) 49.7%; ▌Paul O'Dwyer (Democratic) 32.7%; ▌James L. Buckley (Conservative) 17.3%
North Carolina	Sam Ervin	Democratic	1954 (special); 1954 (Appointed); 1956; 1962	Incumbent re-elected.	▌ ✓ Sam Ervin (Democratic) 60.6%; ▌Robert V. Somers (Republican) 39.4%
North Dakota	Milton Young	Republican	1945 (Appointed); 1946 (special); 1950; 1956; 1962	Incumbent re-elected.	▌ ✓ Milton Young (Republican) 64.6%; ▌Herschel Lashkowitz (Democratic-NPL) 33.7%
Ohio	Frank Lausche	Democratic	1956; 1962	Incumbent lost renomination. Republican gain.	▌ ✓ William B. Saxbe (Republican) 51.5%; ▌John J. Gilligan (Democratic) 48.5%
Oklahoma	Mike Monroney	Democratic	1950; 1956; 1962	Incumbent lost re-election. Republican gain.	▌ ✓ Henry Bellmon (Republican) 51.7%; ▌Mike Monroney (Democratic) 46.2%
Oregon	Wayne Morse	Democratic	1944; 1950; 1956; 1962	Incumbent lost re-election. Republican gain.	▌ ✓ Bob Packwood (Republican) 50.2%; ▌Wayne Morse (Democratic) 49.8%
Pennsylvania	Joseph S. Clark Jr.	Democratic	1956; 1962	Incumbent lost re-election. Republican gain.	▌ ✓ Richard Schweiker (Republican) 51.9%; ▌Joseph S. Clark Jr. (Democratic) 45.8%
South Carolina	Fritz Hollings	Democratic	1966 (special)	Incumbent re-elected.	▌ ✓ Fritz Hollings (Democratic) 61.9%; ▌Marshall Parker (Republican) 38.1%
South Dakota	George McGovern	Democratic	1962	Incumbent re-elected.	▌ ✓ George McGovern (Democratic) 56.8%; ▌Archie M. Gubbrud (Republican) 43.2%
Utah	Wallace F. Bennett	Republican	1950; 1956; 1962	Incumbent re-elected.	▌ ✓ Wallace F. Bennett (Republican) 53.7%; ▌Milton N. Weilenmann (Democratic) 45.8%
Vermont	George Aiken	Republican	1940 (special); 1944; 1950; 1956; 1962	Incumbent re-elected.	▌ ✓ George Aiken (Republican); Unopposed
Washington	Warren Magnuson	Democratic	1944 (Appointed); 1944; 1950; 1956; 1962	Incumbent re-elected.	▌ ✓ Warren Magnuson (Democratic) 64.4%; ▌Jack Metcalf (Republican) 35.3%
Wisconsin	Gaylord Nelson	Democratic	1962	Incumbent re-elected.	▌ ✓ Gaylord Nelson (Democratic) 61.7%; ▌Jerris Leonard (Republican) 38.3%

== Closest races ==
Fifteen races had a margin of victory under 10%:

State	Party of winner	Margin
Oregon	Republican (flip)	0.4%
Iowa	Democratic (flip)	0.6%
Missouri	Democratic	2.2%
Ohio	Republican (flip)	3.0%
Indiana	Democratic	3.5%
Kentucky	Republican	3.8%
California	Democratic (flip)	4.9%
Oklahoma	Republican (flip)	5.5%
Pennsylvania	Republican (flip)	6.1%
Illinois	Republican	6.4%
Alaska	Democratic	7.7%
Utah	Republican	7.9%
Connecticut	Democratic	8.6%
Maryland	Republican (flip)	8.7%
Nevada	Democratic	9.6%

Arkansas was the tipping point state with a margin of 18.3%.

== Alabama ==
Alabama election
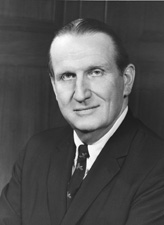

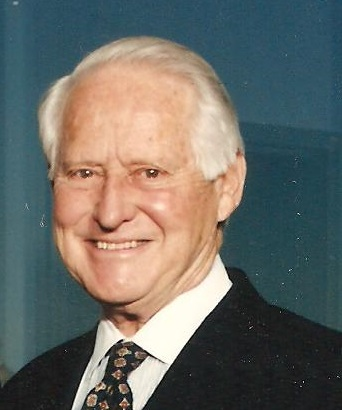

Nominee	James B. Allen	Perry O. Hooper Sr.	Robert P. Schwenn
Party	Democratic	Republican	NDPA
Popular vote	638,744	201,227	72,699
Percentage	69.99%	22.05%	7.97%
- County results Allen: 40–50% 50–60% 60–70% 70–80% 80–90% >90% Hooper: 40-50% Schwenn: 40–50%
U.S. senator before election
J. Lister Hill
Democratic
Elected U.S. Senator
James B. Allen
Democratic

After electing Republicans during Reconstruction, Alabama had historically voted Democratic in local, state, and presidential elections from the 1870s until the 1960s with the passage of the Civil Rights Act. However, in 1948 Alabama did not support the Democratic ticket for the first time in nearly 100 years, voting for Strom Thurmond, who ran a third-party campaign. Democrats lost ground due to the unpopularity of the Civil Rights Act among white voters, who at the time comprised nearly the entire electorate. In 1964, Barry Goldwater became the first Republican to win the state of Alabama since Ulysses Grant, while the state elected Republicans to its congressional delegation for the first time since the turn of the century. Goldwater voted against the Civil Rights Act, which boosted his popularity in Southern states.

In 1962, J. Lister Hill ran for re-election to this seat to a fifth term but faced an unusually close race against Republican James D. Martin, who came within 1% of unseating the incumbent. In 1968, Republicans looked to build upon their momentum but faced a challenge when Lieutenant Governor James B. Allen, a staunch conservative, was nominated by the Democratic Party. Republicans also failed to capitalize on the candidacy of liberal Democrat Hubert H. Humphrey due to the third-party candidacy of Governor George Wallace limiting Republican support. Allen defeated Republican Perry Hooper by a wide margin in the general election and faced little opposition in 1978.

1968 U.S. Senate election in Alabama
Party	Candidate	Votes	%
Democratic	James Allen	638,774	69.71
Republican	Perry O. Hooper Sr.	201,227	21.96
NDPA	Robert Schwenn	76,299	8.33
Majority		437,547	47.75
Turnout		916,300	
Democratic hold			

== Alaska ==
Alaska election
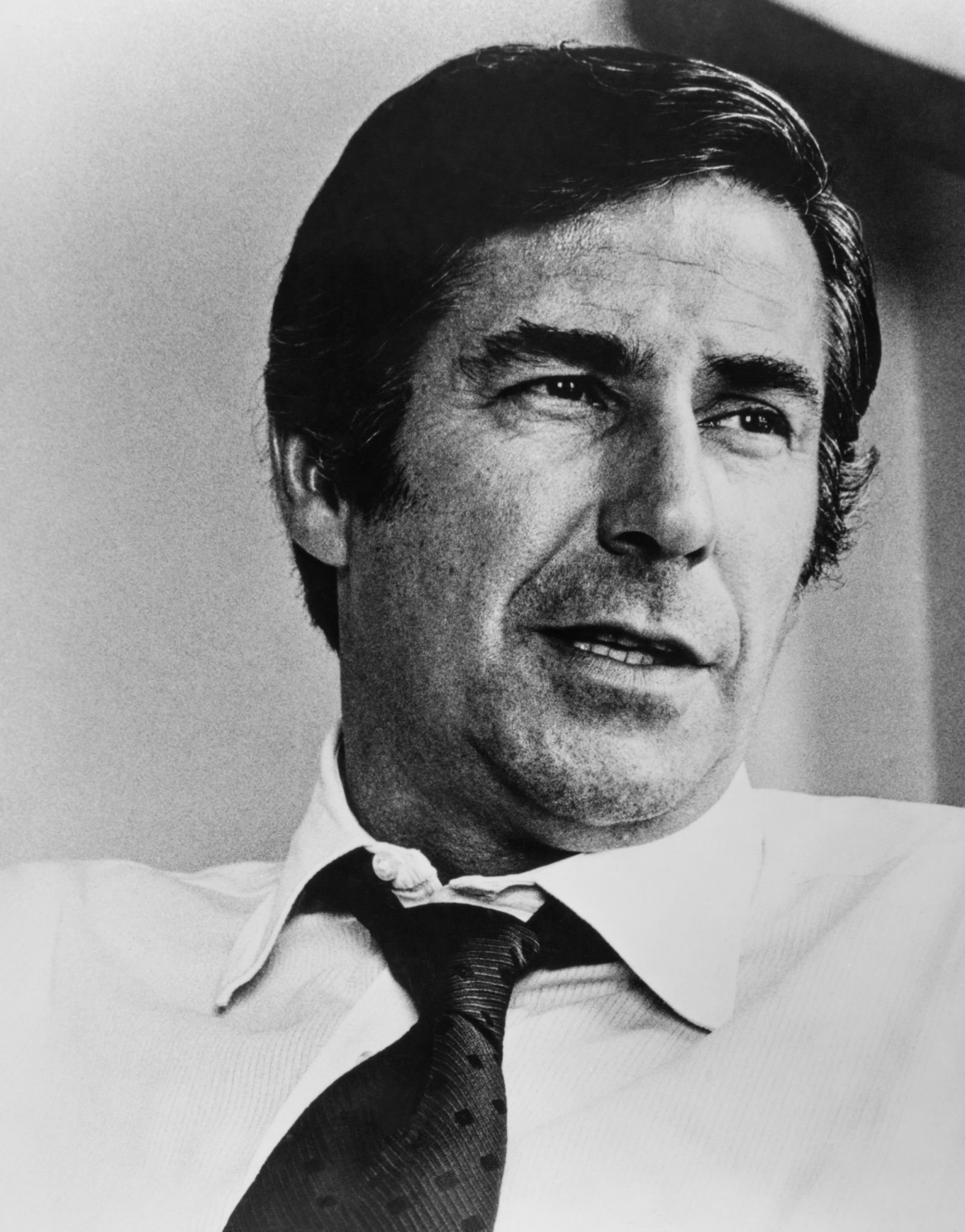

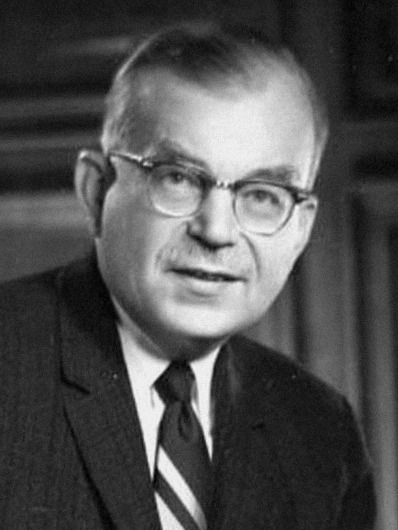

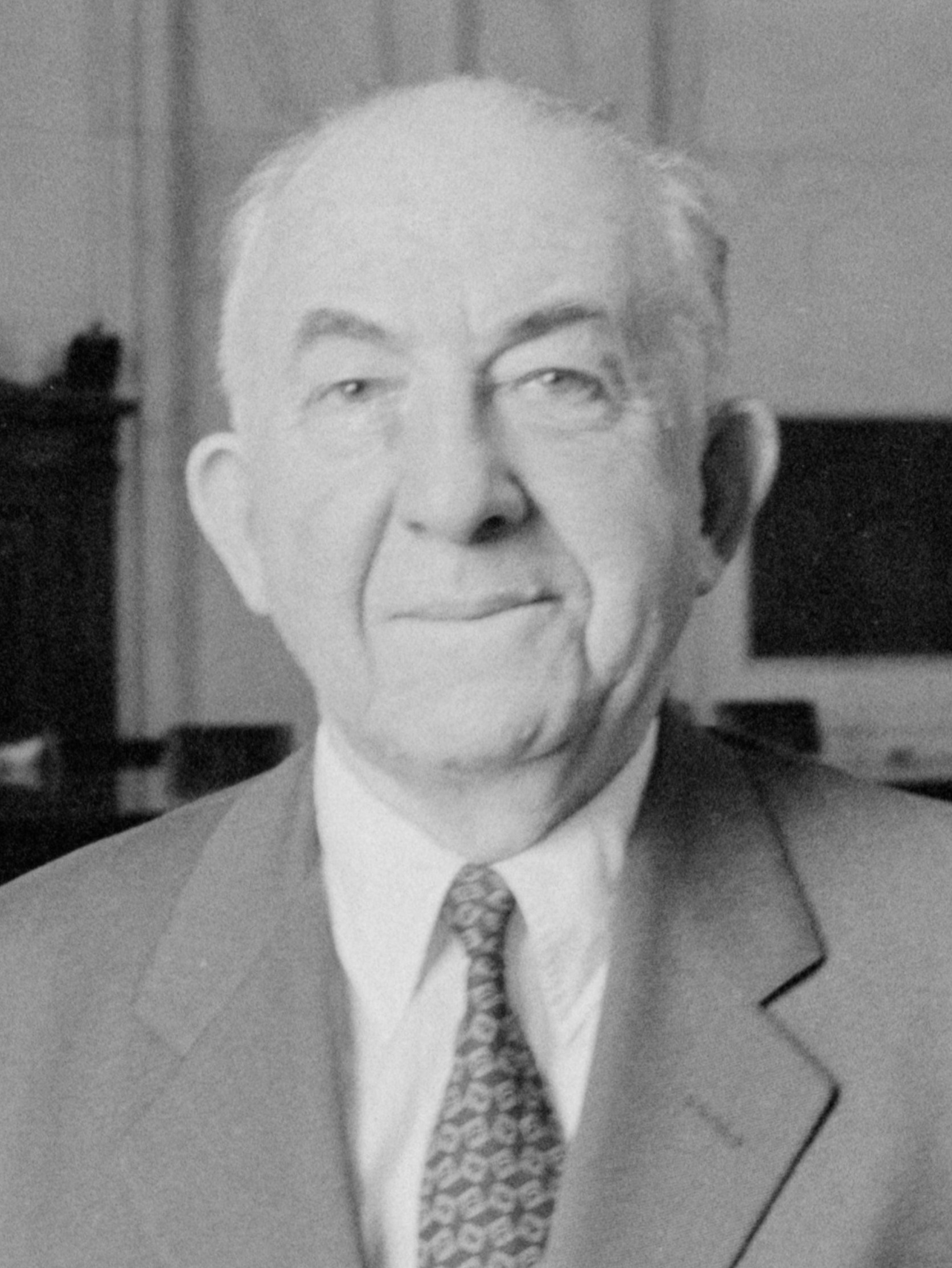
Nominee	Mike Gravel	Elmer Rasmuson	Ernest Gruening (write-in)
Party	Democratic	Republican	Democratic
Popular vote	36,527	30,286	14,118
Percentage	45.13%	37.42%	17.44%
- Results by state house district Gravel: 40–50% 50–60% 60–70% Gruening: 30–40%
U.S. senator before election
Ernest Gruening
Democratic
Elected U.S. Senator
Mike Gravel
Democratic

Democrat Ernest Gruening had served as one of the state's inaugural senators alongside Democrat Bob Bartlett since 1959. He was re-elected in a landslide victory in 1962. In 1968, he was challenged by former Speaker of the Alaska House of Representatives, Mike Gravel, who ran on a campaign of youth. Gravel upset Gruening in the Democratic primary with just under 53% of the vote to 47% for Gruening.

Gravel faced former Anchorage Mayor Republican Elmer E. Rasmuson in the general election, while Gruening ran a write-in campaign. Gravel won a three-way race with 45% of the vote to 37% for Rasmuson, with incumbent Gruening scoring 17%.

1968 U.S. Senate election in Alaska
Party	Candidate	Votes	%
Democratic	Mike Gravel	36,527	45.13
Republican	Elmer E. Rasmuson	30,286	37.42
Write-in	Ernest Gruening (Incumbent)	14,118	17.44
Majority		6,241	7.71
Turnout		80,931	
Democratic hold			

Two months after the election, on December 11, 1968, the other Alaskan senator, Democrat Bob Bartlett, died. Republican Ted Stevens, who lost the Republican primary to Rasmuson for this seat, was then appointed to that other seat.

== Arizona ==
Arizona election
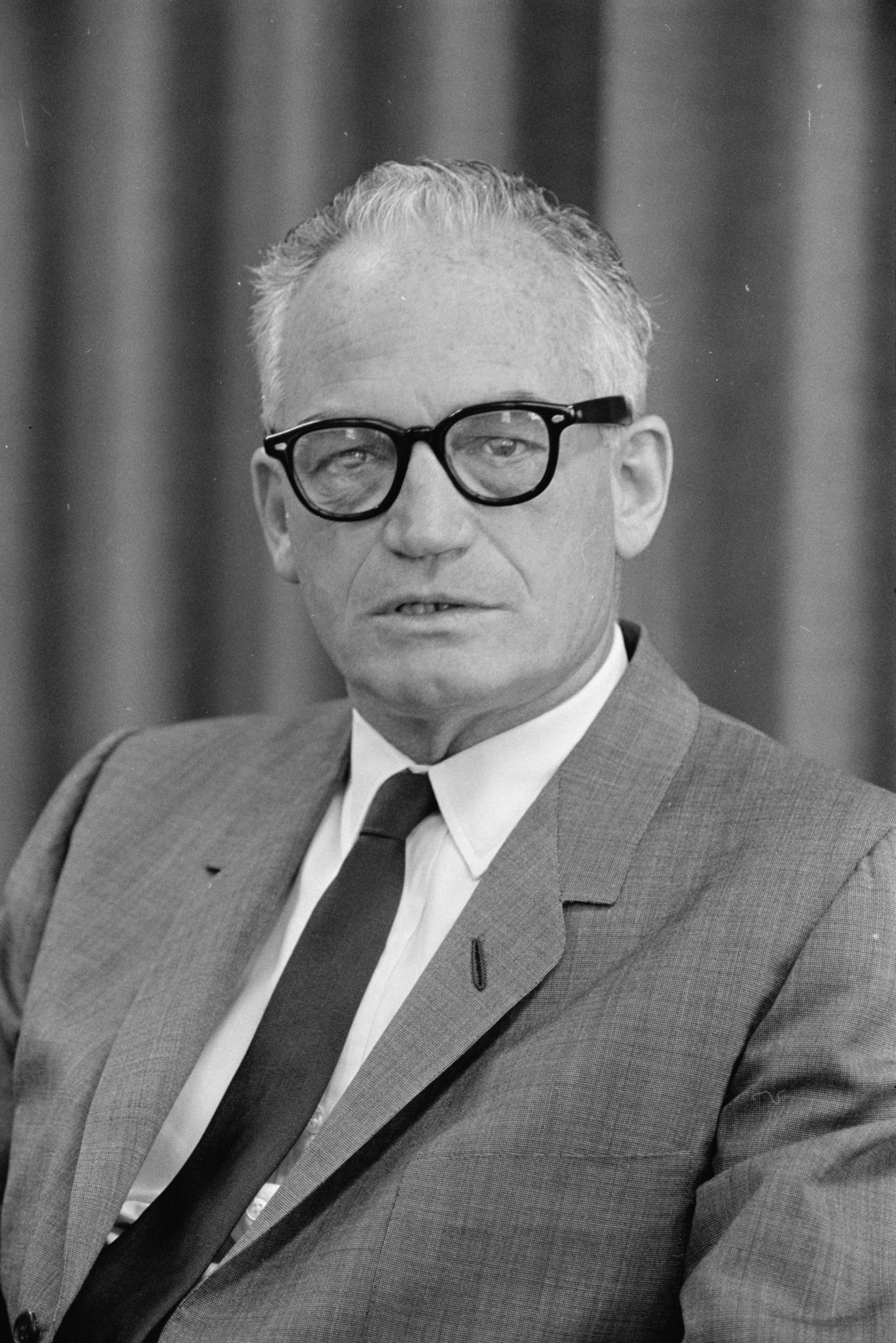

Nominee	Barry Goldwater	Roy Elson
Party	Republican	Democratic
Popular vote	274,607	205,338
Percentage	57.22%	42.78%
- County results Goldwater: 50–60% 60–70% Elson: 50–60% 60–70% 70–80%
U.S. senator before election
Carl Hayden
Democratic
Elected U.S. senator
Barry Goldwater
Republican

Incumbent Democrat Carl Hayden did not run for re-election to an eighth term, with his long-time staff member Roy Elson running as the Democratic Party nominee to replace him. Elson beat State Treasurer of Arizona Bob Kennedy in the primary.

Democratic primary, September 10, 1968
Party	Candidate	Votes	%
Democratic	Roy Elson	95,231	62.78
Democratic	Bob Kennedy	41,397	27.29
Democratic	Dick Herbert	15,061	9.93
Turnout		151,689	43.18

Elson was defeated by a wide margin, however, by former U.S. senator and Republican presidential nominee Barry Goldwater. Prior to Goldwater's election, the seat had been held for decades by the Democratic Party under Carl Hayden, and would remain under Republican Party control until 2020. Elson had previously challenged U.S. senator Paul Fannin in 1964, when Goldwater vacated his seat to run for President against Lyndon B. Johnson.

Arizona general election
Party	Candidate	Votes	%
Republican	Barry Goldwater	274,607	57.22
Democratic	Roy Elson	205,338	42.78
Majority		69,269	14.44
Turnout		479,945	78.08
Republican gain from Democratic			

== Arkansas ==
Arkansas election
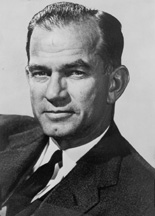

Nominee	J. William Fulbright	Charles T. Bernard
Party	Democratic	Republican
Popular vote	349,965	241,731
Percentage	59.15%	40.85%
- County Results Fulbright: 50–60% 60–70% 70–80% Bernard: 50–60% 60-70%
U.S. senator before election
J. William Fulbright
Democratic
Elected U.S. Senator
J. William Fulbright
Democratic

J. William Fulbright was first elected in 1944 against token Republican opposition. He ran unopposed in 1950 and won by large margins in 1956 and 1962, but he saw his vote percentage slip in the latter. In the wake of Civil Rights legislation, which many southern whites opposed, Fulbright was re-elected in 1968 but by the smallest margin of his career. He faced Charles T. Bernard and won with just over 59% of the vote. Arkansas would not elect a Republican to this seat until 2010 with John Boozman's election.

1968 U.S. Senate election in Arkansas
Party	Candidate	Votes	%
Democratic	J. William Fulbright (Incumbent)	349,965	59.15
Republican	Charles T. Bernard	241,731	40.85
Majority		108,234	18.30
Turnout		591,696	
Democratic hold			

== California ==
California election
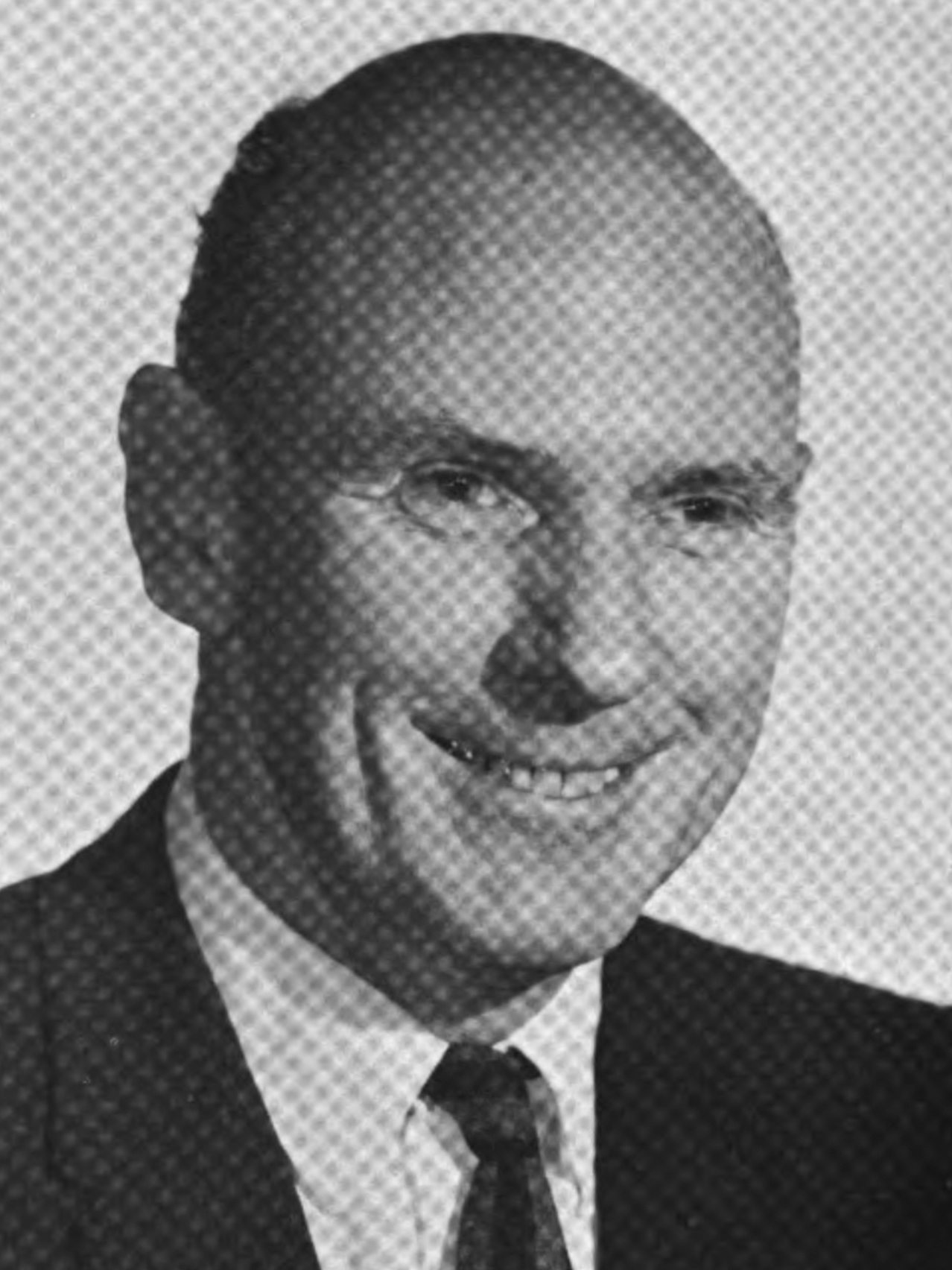

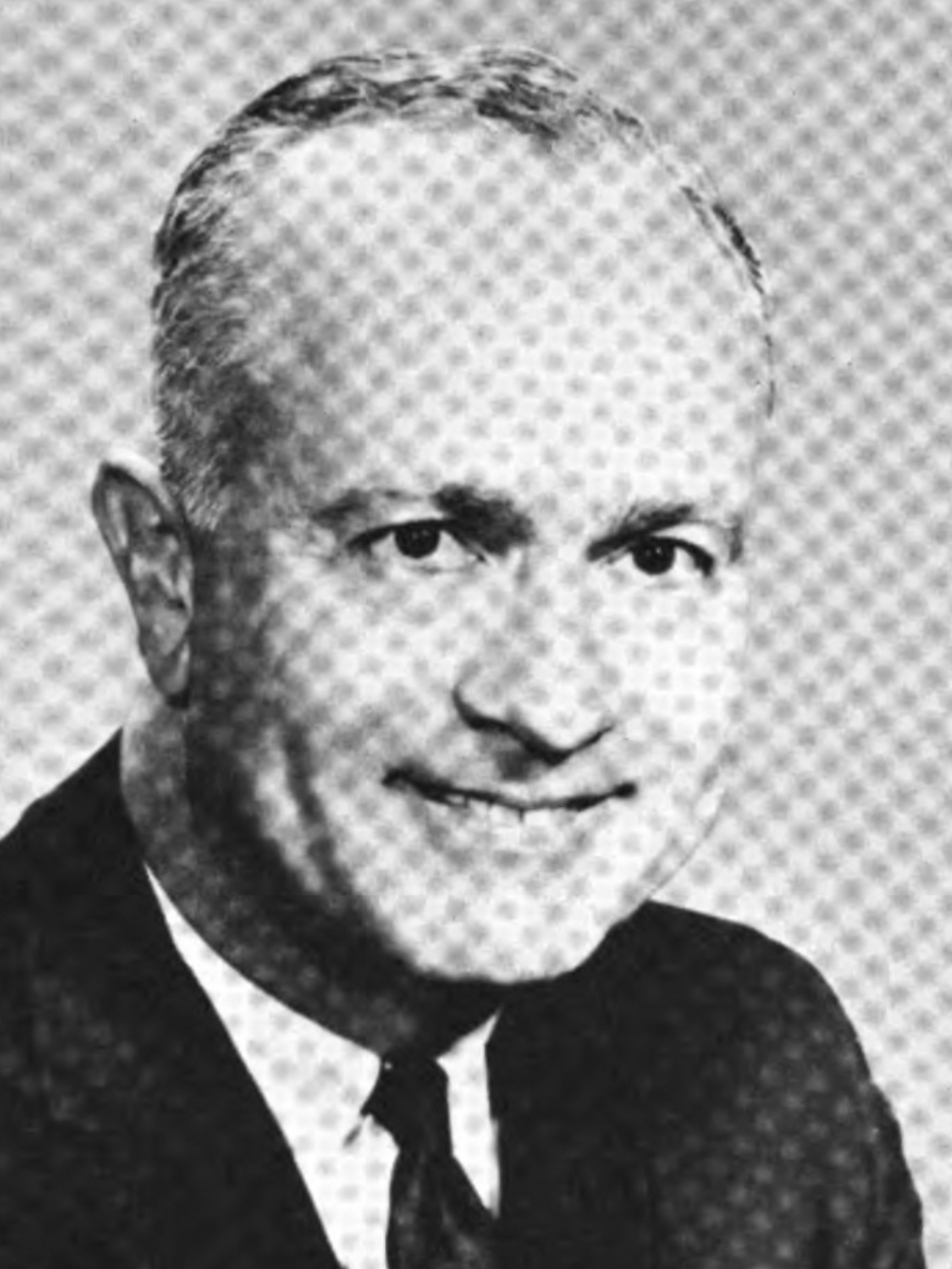
Nominee	Alan Cranston	Max Rafferty
Party	Democratic	Republican
Popular vote	3,680,352	3,329,148
Percentage	51.82%	46.87%
- County Results; Cranston: 40-50% 50–60% 60–70% Rafferty: 40–50% 50–60% 60–70%
U.S. senator before election
Thomas Kuchel
Republican
Elected U.S. senator
Alan Cranston
Democratic

California was generally considered to be a Republican stronghold throughout the early 1900s. Until 1959, Republicans controlled most government offices as well as both houses of state government. However, Pat Brown was elected governor in 1958 and ushered in a wave of Democratic success.

Along with California Secretary of State Frank M. Jordan, incumbent U.S. Senator Thomas Kuchel was one of the last Republicans elected from California at the state or U.S. Senate level. Kuchel had been re-elected by a wide margin in 1962, winning every county in the state, and was the Minority Whip for the Republican Party.

However, in 1968 he faced a primary challenge from California Superintendent of Public Instruction Max Rafferty, who ran to the right of moderate Kuchel. In an upset, Rafferty defeated Kuchel in the primary, 50-47%.

In the Democratic primary, former California State Controller Alan Cranston won the primary with 58% of the vote.

Despite Richard Nixon's concurrent win in the presidential election (as well as in the state of California), Cranston defeated Rafferty on election day with just under 52% of the vote, flipping the state's other senate seat to the Democrats. Rafferty took just under 47% of the vote. Cranston would serve until 1993 in the senate.

1968 U.S. Senate election in California
Party	Candidate	Votes	%
Democratic	Alan Cranston	3,615,261	51.78
Republican	Max Rafferty	3,275,679	46.91
Peace and Freedom	Paul Jacobs	91,254	1.31
Majority		339,582	4.87
Turnout		6,982,194	
Democratic gain from Republican			

== Colorado ==
Colorado election
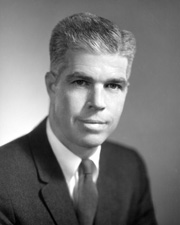

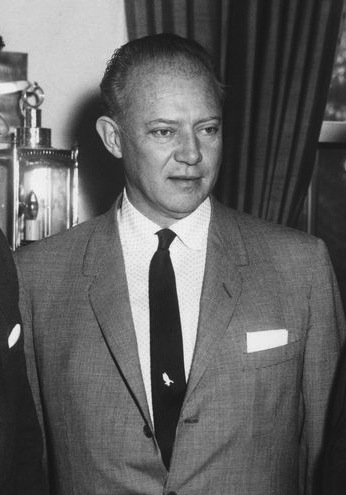
Nominee	Peter Dominick	Stephen McNichols
Party	Republican	Democratic
Popular vote	459,952	325,584
Percentage	58.55%	41.45%
- County results Dominick: 50–60% 60–70% 70–80% McNichols: 50–60% 60–70%
U.S. senator before election
Peter Dominick
Republican
Elected U.S. Senator
Peter Dominick
Republican

Incumbent Republican Peter Dominick won election in 1962 over Democratic incumbent John A. Carroll by eight percentage points. In 1968, he increased his margin of victory against Stephen McNichols in what would be his last U.S. Senate victory. He would lose in 1974 to Gary Hart.

1968 U.S. Senate election in Colorado
Party	Candidate	Votes	%
Republican	Peter H. Dominick (Incumbent)	459,952	58.55
Democratic	Stephen L. R. McNichols	325,584	41.45
Majority		134,368	17.10
Turnout		785,536	
Republican hold			

== Connecticut ==
Connecticut election
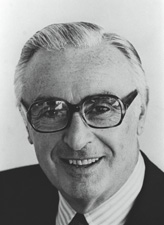

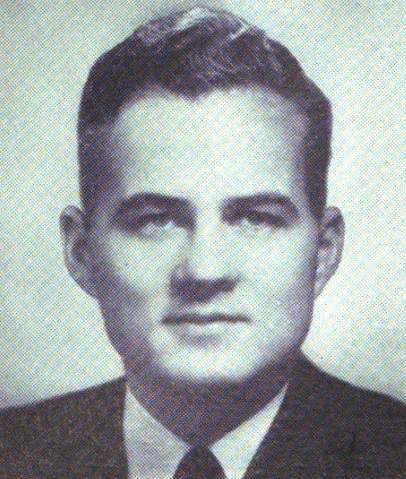
Nominee	Abraham Ribicoff	Edwin H. May Jr.
Party	Democratic	Republican
Popular vote	655,043	551,455
Percentage	54.29%	45.71%
- Ribicoff: 50–60% 60-70% 70-80% May: 50-60% 60-70% 70-80%
U.S. senator before election
Abraham Ribicoff
Democratic
Elected U.S. Senator
Abraham Ribicoff
Democratic

Incumbent Abraham Ribicoff was elected in 1962 after the retirement of Prescott Bush by a razor-thin 51–49 margin. He increased his margin of victory in 1968 over Republican Representative Edwin H. May Jr.

1968 U.S. Senate election in Connecticut
Party	Candidate	Votes	%
Democratic	Abraham Ribicoff (Incumbent)	655,043	54.29
Republican	Edwin H. May Jr.	551,455	45.71
None	Scattering	39	0.00
Majority		103,588	8.58
Turnout		1,206,537	
Democratic hold			

== Florida ==
Florida election
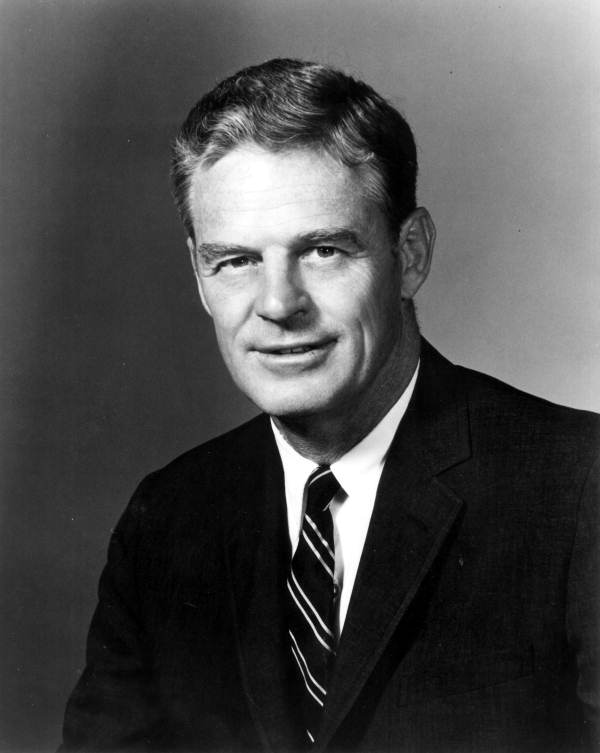

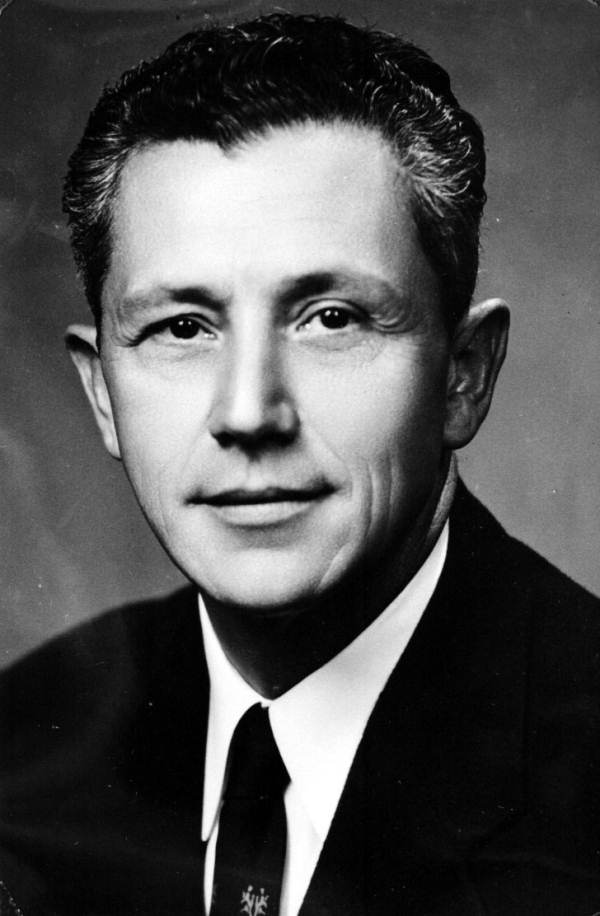
Nominee	Edward Gurney	LeRoy Collins
Party	Republican	Democratic
Popular vote	1,131,499	892,637
Percentage	55.9%	44.1%
- County Results Gurney: 50–60% 60–70% 70–80% Collins: 50–60% 60–70%
U.S. senator before election
George Smathers
Democratic
Elected U.S. senator
Edward Gurney
Republican

Incumbent Democrat George Smathers retired. After supporting Republicans during Reconstruction, Florida supported almost only Democrats down-ballot until the 1940s, when the state voted for Eisenhower. Claude R. Kirk Jr. was elected governor in 1966 as Republicans gained ground in the South due to Democrats shifting leftward and Republicans rightward.

Popular Democrat LeRoy Collins defeated State Attorney General Earl Faircloth in the Democratic primary, while Republican Representative Edward Gurney won the Republican primary. Despite less name recognition in the state, Gurney defeated Collins by 11 points and won all but five counties.

1968 U.S. Senate election in Florida
Party	Candidate	Votes	%
Republican	Edward J. Gurney	1,131,499	55.90
Democratic	LeRoy Collins	892,637	44.10
Majority		238,862	11.80
Turnout		2,024,136	
Republican gain from Democratic			

== Georgia ==
Georgia election
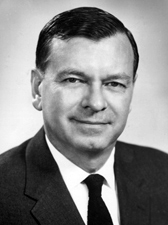

Nominee	Herman Talmadge	E. Earl Patton
Party	Democratic	Republican
Popular vote	885,093	246,865
Percentage	77.51%	22.49%
- County results Talmadge: 50–60% 60–70% 70–80% 80–90% >90% Patton: 50-60%
U.S. senator before election
Herman Talmadge
Democratic
Elected U.S. Senator
Herman Talmadge
Democratic

Democrat Herman Talmadge handily won re-election over Republican E. Earl Patton, who won the first-ever Republican primary in Georgia for U.S. Senate.

1968 U.S. Senate election in Georgia
Party	Candidate	Votes	%
Democratic	Herman Talmadge (Incumbent)	885,093	77.50
Republican	E. Earl Patton	256,796	22.49
Write-in	Write-Ins	95	0.01
Majority		628,297	55.01
Turnout		1,141,984	
Democratic hold			

Talmadge sought another term to the Senate and was easily re-elected. The election was notable for the Georgia Republican Party, as it marked the first U.S. Senate election where it fielded a candidate. Patton lost by over 50% to Talmadge.

== Hawaii ==
Hawaii election
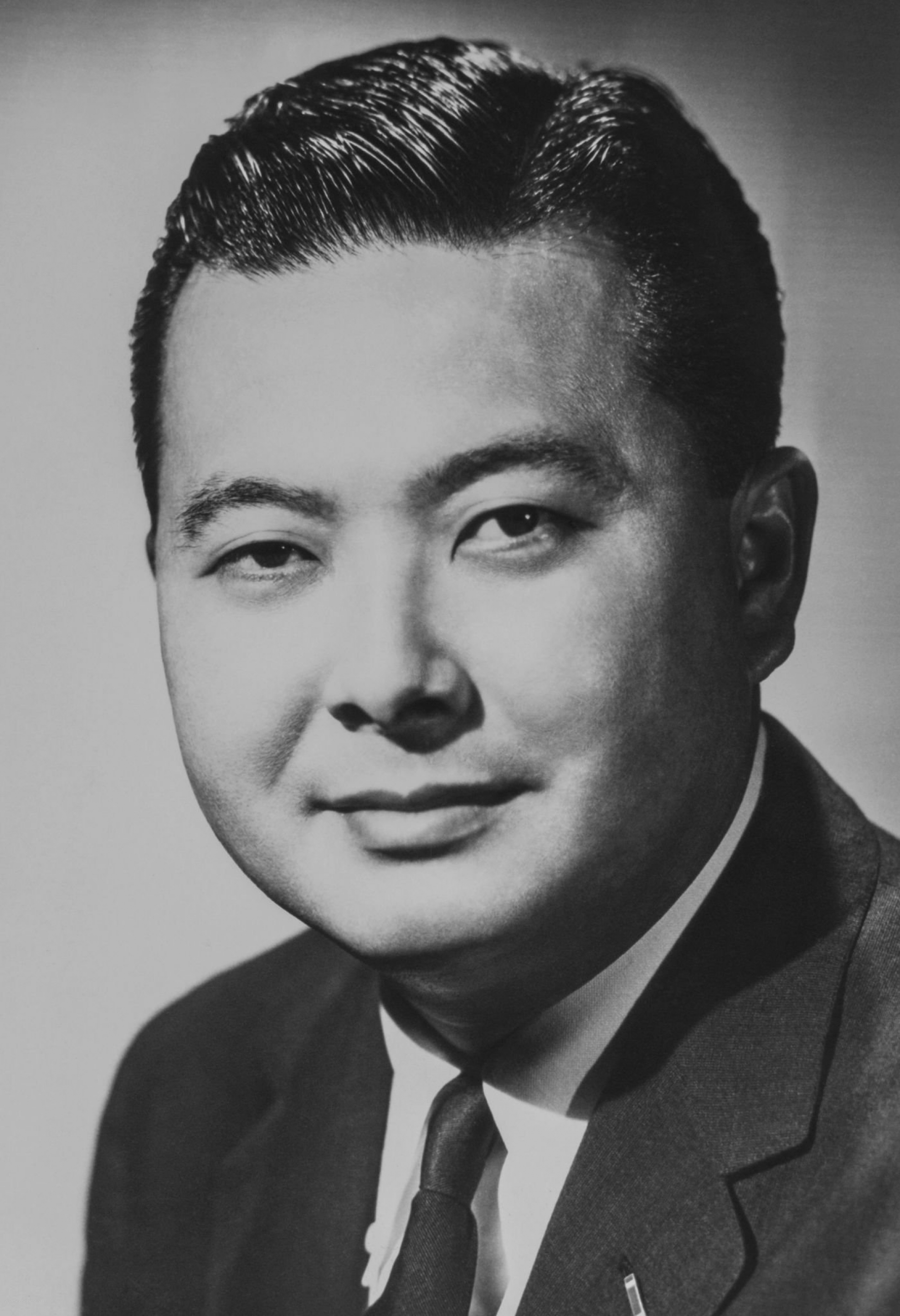

Nominee	Daniel Inouye	Wayne Thiessen
Party	Democratic	Republican
Popular vote	189,248	42,767
Percentage	83.40%	14.99%
- County results Inouye: 80–90%
U.S. senator before election
Daniel Inouye
Democratic
Elected U.S. Senator
Daniel Inouye
Democratic

Incumbent Daniel Inouye handily won re-election against Republican Wayne C. Thiessen with 83% of the vote.

1968 U.S. Senate election in Hawaii
Party	Candidate	Votes	%
Democratic	Daniel Inouye (Incumbent)	189,248	83.40
Republican	Wayne C. Thiessen	34,008	14.99
Peace and Freedom	Oliver M. Lee	3,671	1.62
Majority		155,240	68.41
Turnout		226,927	
Democratic hold			

== Idaho ==
Idaho election
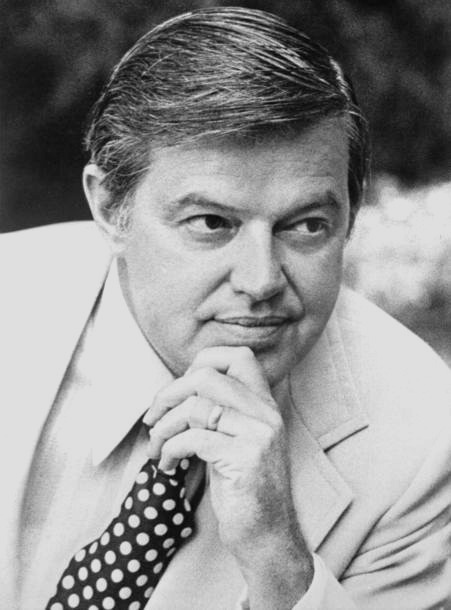

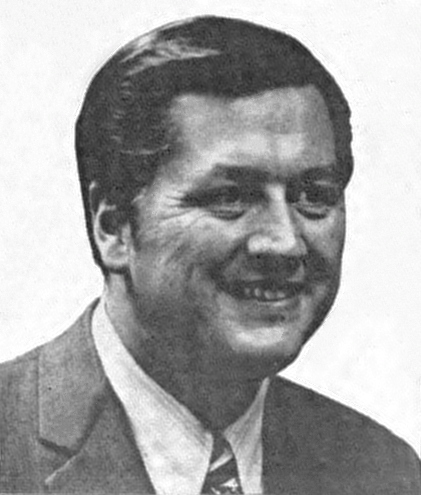
Nominee	Frank Church	George V. Hansen
Party	Democratic	Republican
Popular vote	173,482	114,394
Percentage	60.26%	39.74%
- County results Church: 50–60% 60–70% 70–80% 80–90% Hansen: 50–60%
U.S. senator before election
Frank Church
Democratic
Elected U.S. Senator
Frank Church
Democratic

Incumbent Democrat Frank Church won re-election by a wide margin against George V. Hansen despite the state's overall Republican trend.

1968 U.S. Senate election in Idaho
Party	Candidate	Votes	%
Democratic	Frank Church (Incumbent)	173,482	60.26
Republican	George V. Hansen	114,394	39.74
Majority		59,088	20.52
Turnout		287,876	
Democratic hold			

== Illinois ==
Illinois election
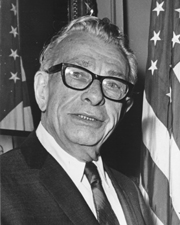

Nominee	Everett Dirksen	William G. Clark
Party	Republican	Democratic
Popular vote	2,358,947	2,073,242
Percentage	53.01%	46.59%
- County results Dirksen: 50–60% 60–70% 70–80% Clark: 50–60%
U.S. senator before election
Everett Dirksen
Republican
Elected U.S. senator
Everett Dirksen
Republican

Incumbent Republican and Minority Leader Everett Dirksen won re-election to his fourth term over William G. Clark (D), the Illinois Attorney General. He would not serve the entirety of his term as he would die in 1970.

1968 U.S. Senate election in Illinois
Party	Candidate	Votes	%
Republican	Everett Dirksen (Incumbent)	2,358,947	53.01
Democratic	William G. Clark	2,073,242	46.59
Socialist Labor	Louis Fisher	17,542	0.39
Independent	Write-in candidates	26	0.00
Invalid or blank votes			
Total votes		4,449,757	100.00
Turnout			
Republican hold			

== Indiana ==
Indiana election
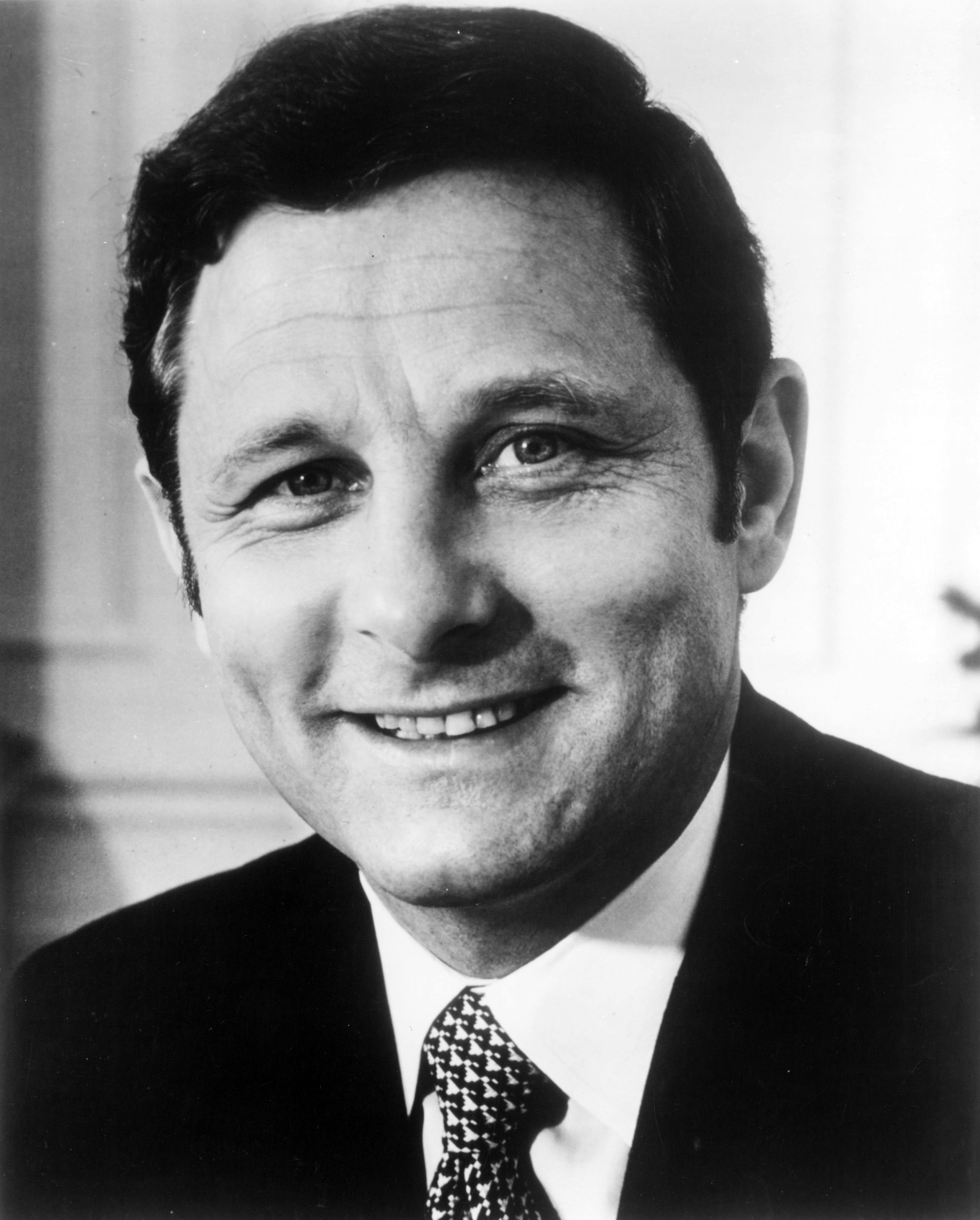

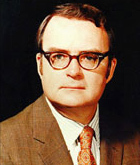
Nominee	Birch Bayh	William Ruckelshaus
Party	Democratic	Republican
Popular vote	1,060,456	988,571
Percentage	51.65%	48.15%
- County results Bayh: 50–60% 60–70% Ruckelshaus: 40–50% 50–60% 60-70%
U.S. senator before election
Birch Bayh
Democratic
Elected U.S. Senator
Birch Bayh
Democratic

Incumbent Democrat Birch Bayh was elected in 1962, defeating incumbent Republican Homer E. Capehart by around 11,000 votes. In 1970, he ran for re-election and faced Republican State Representative William Ruckelshaus in the general election.

Ruckelshaus ran a close race but Bayh was ultimately re-elected by a two-point margin. This would actually be Bayh's largest vote percentage in an election to the U.S. Senate. In 1974, he won a narrow majority of the vote over Republican Richard Lugar though he did increase his margin of victory. He was defeated in his re-election bid in 1980 by future Vice President Dan Quayle.

Birch Bayh's son Evan Bayh would also serve in the U.S. Senate from 1999 to 2011.

1968 U.S. Senate election in Indiana
Party	Candidate	Votes	%
Democratic	Birch Bayh (Incumbent)	1,060,456	51.65
Republican	William Ruckelshaus	988,571	48.15
Prohibition	L. Earl Malcolm	2,844	0.14
Socialist Workers	Ralph Levitt	1,247	0.06
Majority		71,885	3.50
Turnout		2,053,118	
Democratic hold			

== Iowa ==
1968 United States Senate election in Iowa
- November 5, 1968
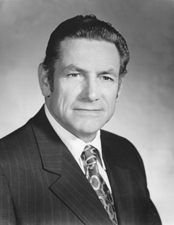

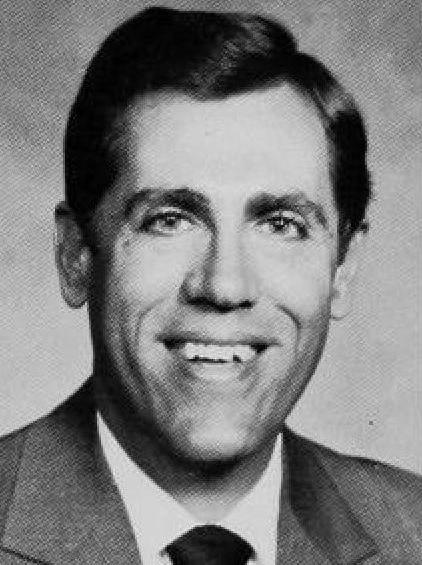
Nominee	Harold E. Hughes	David M. Stanley
Party	Democratic	Republican
Popular vote	574,884	568,469
Percentage	50.25%	49.69%
- County results Hughes: 50–60% 60–70% Stanley: 50-60% 60-70% 70-80%
U.S. senator before election
Bourke B. Hickenlooper
Republican
Elected U.S. Senator
Harold E. Hughes
Democratic

Four-term Republican Bourke B. Hickenlooper retired. Two-term Democratic Governor of Iowa Harold Hughes was elected senator in a close race against Republican state senator David M. Stanley.

1968 U.S. Senate election in Iowa
Party	Candidate	Votes	%
Democratic	Harold Hughes	574,884	50.25
Republican	David M. Stanley	568,469	49.69
Prohibition	Uerne M. Higens	727	0.06
None	Scattering	6	0.00
Majority		6,415	0.56
Turnout		1,144,086	41.52
Democratic gain from Republican			

== Kansas ==
Kansas election
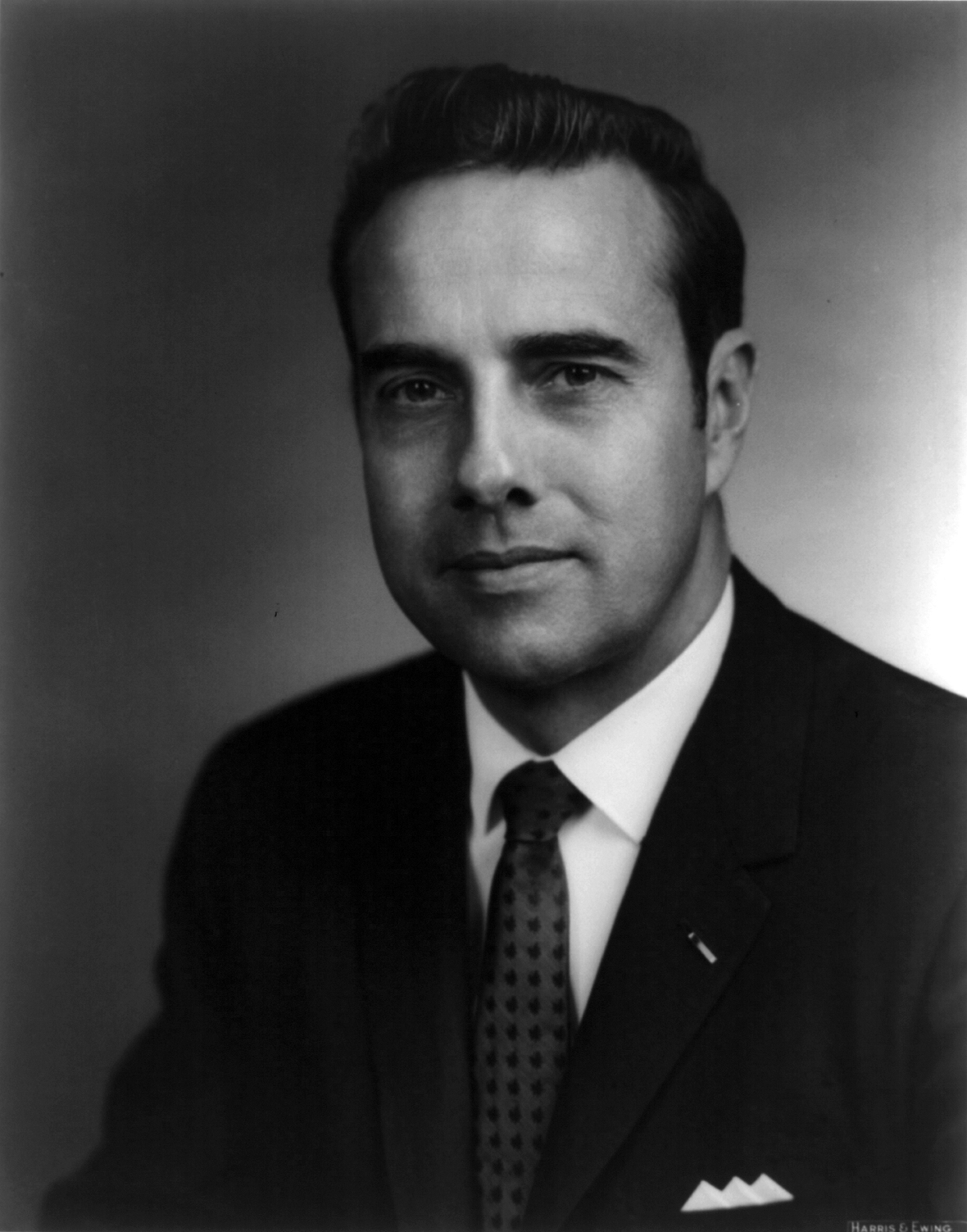

Nominee	Bob Dole	William I. Robinson
Party	Republican	Democratic
Popular vote	490,911	315,911
Percentage	60.08%	38.66%
- County results Dole: 50-60% 60-70% 70-80% Robinson: 50–60%
U.S. senator before election
Frank Carlson
Republican
Elected U.S. senator
Bob Dole
Republican

Incumbent Republican Frank Carlson chose to retire rather than seek re-election. Republican Bob Dole defeated Democrat William Robinson with 60% of the vote and won all but one county in the state. Still, this would be his second-worst U.S. Senate election performance after 1974 in the wake of Watergate.

1968 U.S. Senate election in Kansas
Party	Candidate	Votes	%
Republican	Bob Dole	490,911	60.08
Democratic	William I. Robinson	315,911	38.66
Prohibition	Joseph Fred Hyskell	10,262	1.26
None	Scattering	12	0.00
Majority		175,000	21.42
Turnout		817,096	
Republican hold			

== Kentucky ==
Kentucky election
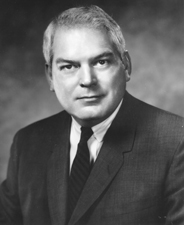

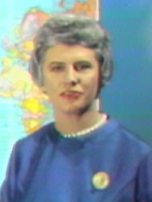
Nominee	Marlow Cook	Katherine Peden
Party	Republican	Democratic
Popular vote	484,260	448,960
Percentage	51.36%	47.62%
- County results Cook: 40-50% 50-60% 60-70% 70-80% 80–90% Peden: 40–50% 50–60% 60–70% 70–80%
U.S. senator before election
Thruston Morton
Republican
Elected U.S. senator
Marlow Cook
Republican

Though originally voting strongly Democratic like the rest of the South after Reconstruction, Kentucky began electing Republicans in the 1890s but still leaned Democratic. Still, Republicans found success with the elections to U.S. Senate of Thruston Ballard Morton and John Sherman Cooper. Morton decided to retire in 1968, creating an open seat. Republican Marlow Cook narrowly defeated Democrat Katherine Peden by a 51–48 margin.

1968 U.S. Senate election in Kentucky
Party	Candidate	Votes	%
Republican	Marlow Cook	484,260	51.36
Democratic	Katherine Peden	448,960	47.62
American Independent	Duane F. Olsen	9,645	1.02
Majority		35,300	3.74
Turnout		942,865	
Republican hold			

== Louisiana ==
1968 Democratic Senate primary election in Louisiana
- August 17, 1968
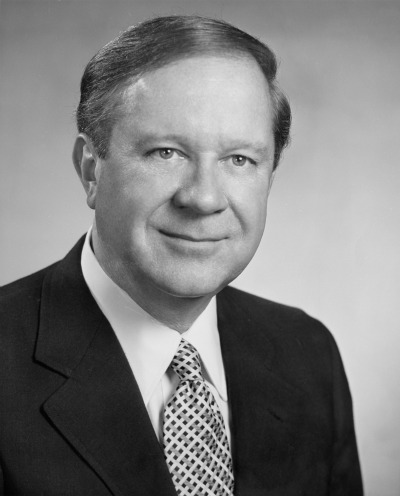

Nominee	Russell B. Long	Maurice Blache
Party	Democratic	Democratic
Popular vote	494,467	73,791
Percentage	87.02%	12.99%
- Parish results Long: 60–70% 70–80% 80–90% >90% Blache: 60–70%
U.S. senator before election
Russell Long
Democratic
Elected U.S. Senator
Russell Long
Democratic

Incumbent Democrat Russell B. Long ran unopposed for U.S. Senate and was re-elected.

1968 U.S. Senate election in Louisiana
Party	Candidate	Votes	%
Democratic	Russell B. Long (Incumbent)	518,586	100.00
Democratic hold			

== Maryland ==
Maryland election
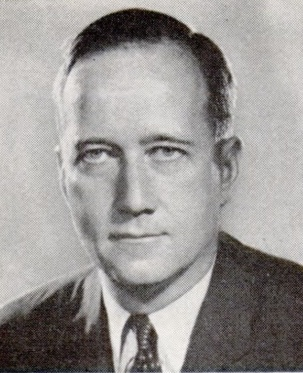

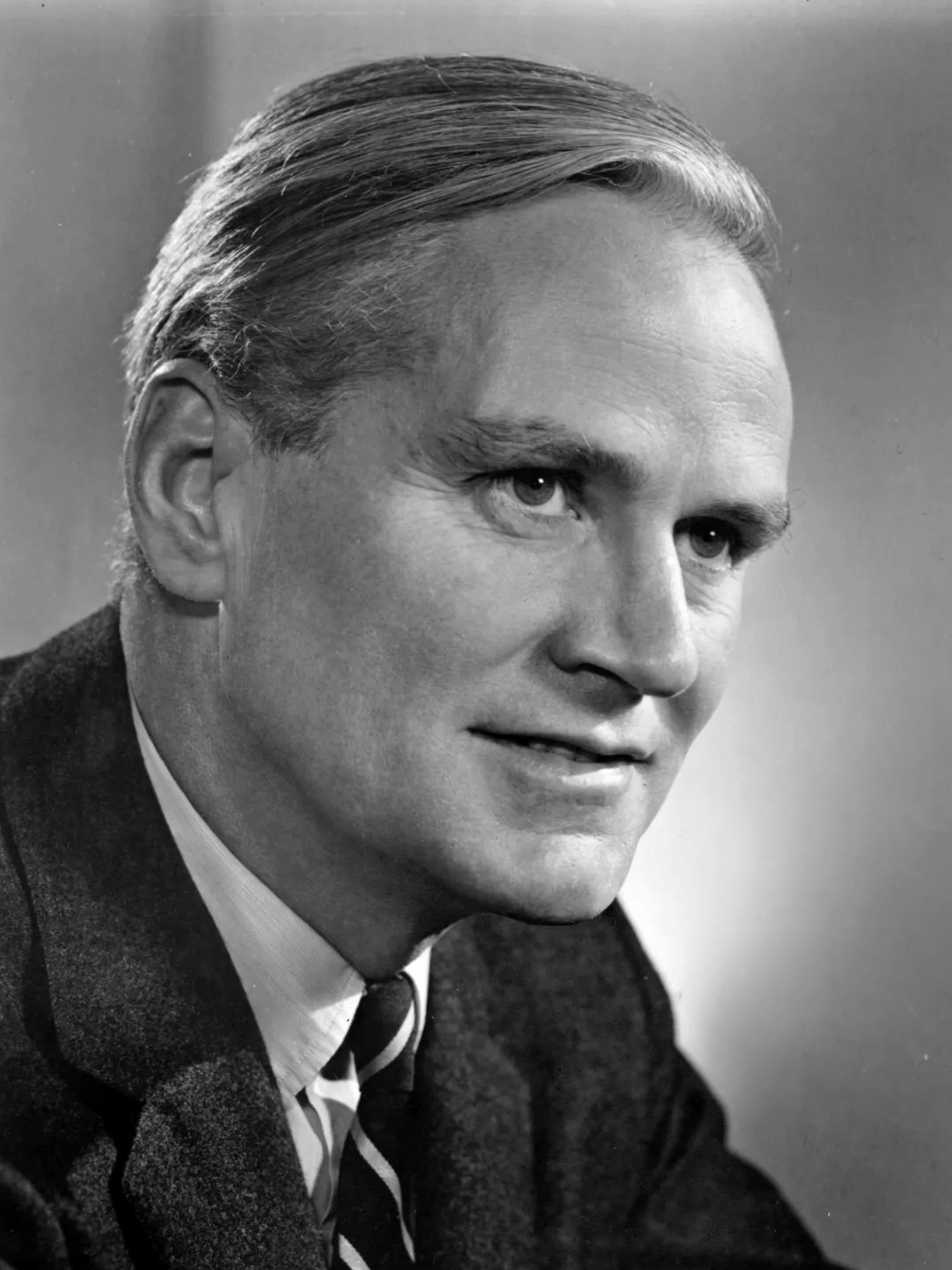

Nominee	Charles Mathias	Daniel Brewster	George P. Mahoney
Party	Republican	Democratic	American Independent
Popular vote	541,893	443,667	148,467
Percentage	47.79%	39.12%	13.09%
- County results Mathias: 30–40% 40–50% 50–60% 60–70% Brewster: 30–40% 40–50% 50–60%
U.S. senator before election
Daniel Brewster
Democratic
Elected U.S. Senator
Charles Mathias Jr.
Republican

Incumbent Democrat Daniel Brewster was originally elected in 1962 over Republican Representative Edward Tylor Miller. He won the Democratic primary and faced Republican Representative Charles Mathias in the general election. However, Democrat George P. Mahoney ran in the election under the American Independent Party. Mahoney, who ran against the Civil Rights movement, had previously been the Democratic nominee for governor in 1966 losing to Spiro Agnew. Hyman A. Pressman ran an independent campaign which allowed Republican Agnew to carry the heavily Democratic state with 49.5% of the vote.

Similarly, Mahoney ran a well-funded campaign in 1968 and Brewster was defeated in the general election. Mathias won just 48% of the vote to 39% for Brewster (and 13% for Mahoney), similarly elected to Agnew. Mathias would nonetheless have no trouble being re-elected in 1974 and 1980 (when he won the city of Baltimore). Mathias is the last Republican to represent Maryland in the U.S. Senate.

1968 U.S. Senate election in Maryland
Party	Candidate	Votes	%
Republican	Charles Mathias	541,893	47.78
Democratic	Daniel B. Brewster (Incumbent)	443,667	39.12
American Independent	George P. Mahoney	148,467	13.09
Majority		98,226	8.66
Turnout		1,134,027	
Republican gain from Democratic			

== Missouri ==
1968 United States Senate election in Missouri
- November 5, 1968
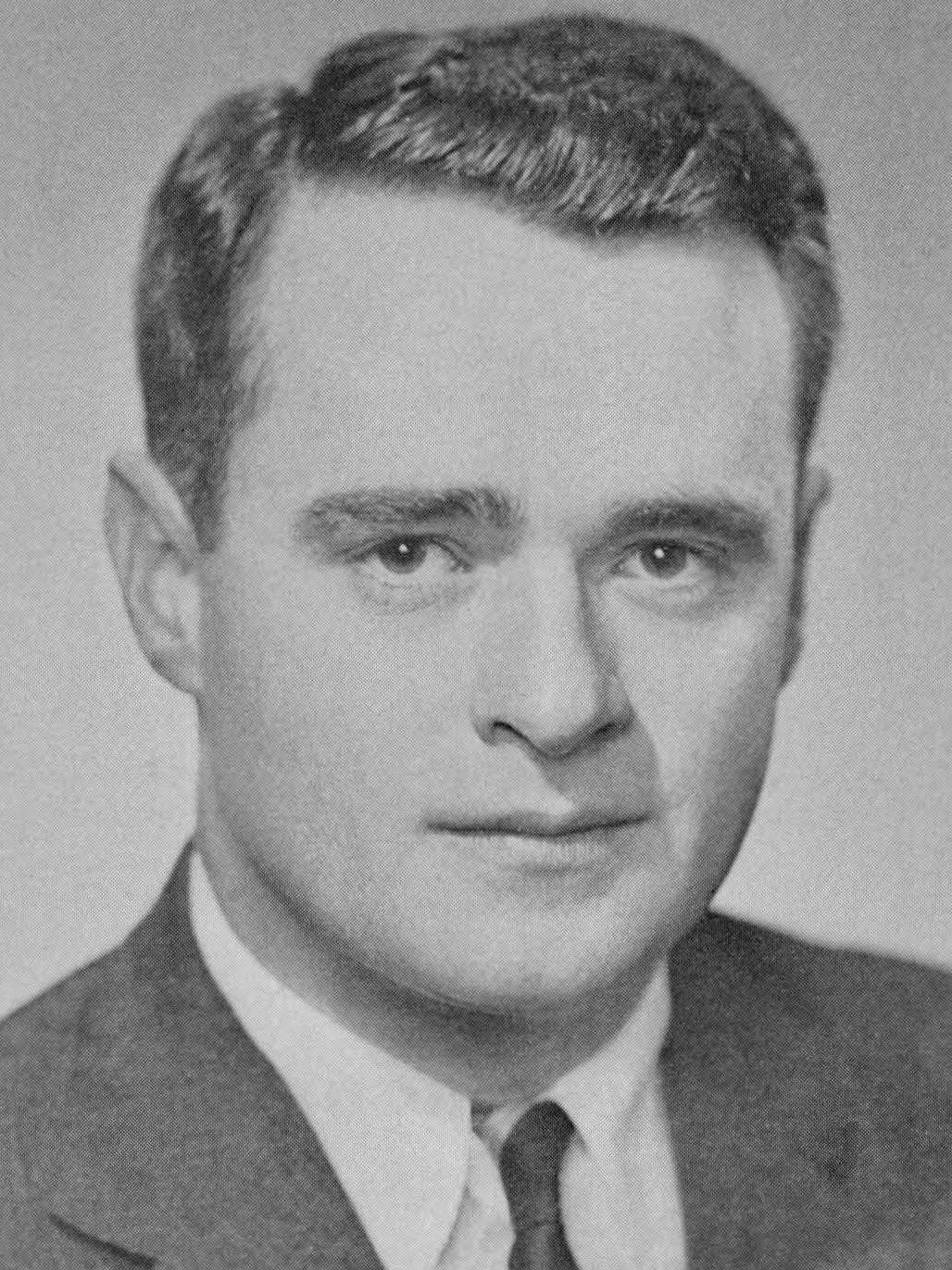

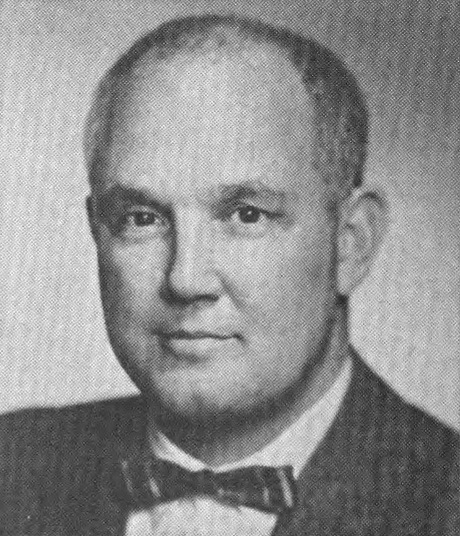
Nominee	Thomas Eagleton	Thomas B. Curtis
Party	Democratic	Republican
Popular vote	887,414	850,544
Percentage	51.06%	48.94%
- County results Eagleton: 50–60% 60–70% Curtis: 50–60% 60–70% 70–80%
U.S. senator before election
Edward V. Long
Democratic
Elected U.S. Senator
Thomas Eagleton
Democratic

Incumbent U.S. Senator Edward V. Long ran for re-election but faced two primary challengers in Lieutenant Governor Thomas Eagleton and former Assistant Secretary of the Treasury W. True Davis Jr., who each ran strong campaigns. Eagleton won the primary with 37% of the vote. In the general election, Eagleton faced Republican Representative Thomas B. Curtis and won a close-fought election with 51% of the vote to 49% for Curtis. Eagleton would be re-elected over Curtis again in 1974.

1968 U.S. Senate election in Missouri
Party	Candidate	Votes	%
Democratic	Thomas Eagleton	880,113	51.01
Republican	Thomas B. Curtis	845,144	48.99
Majority		34,969	2.02
Turnout		1,725,257	
Democratic hold			

== Nevada ==
1968 United States Senate election in Nevada
- November 5, 1968
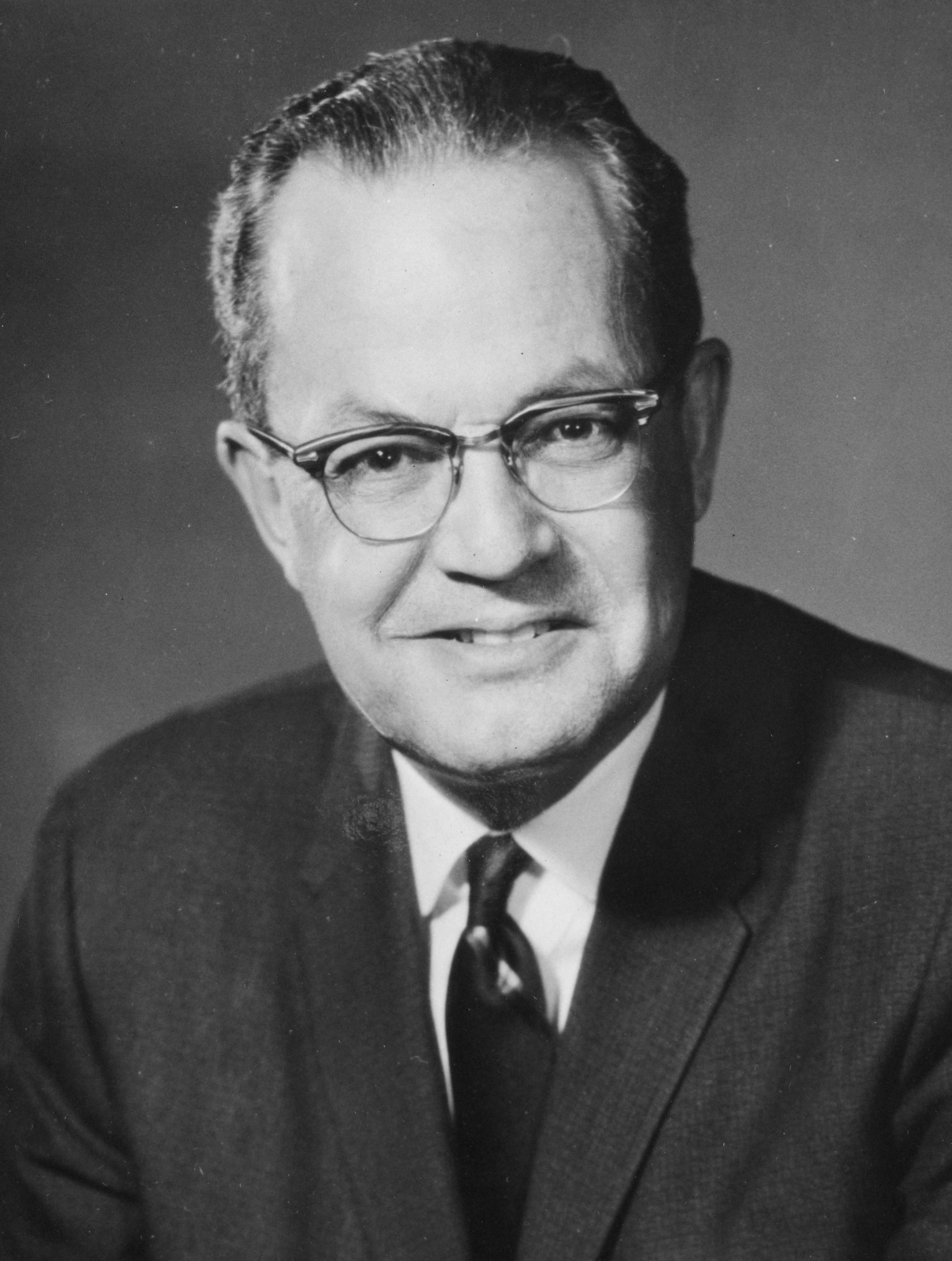

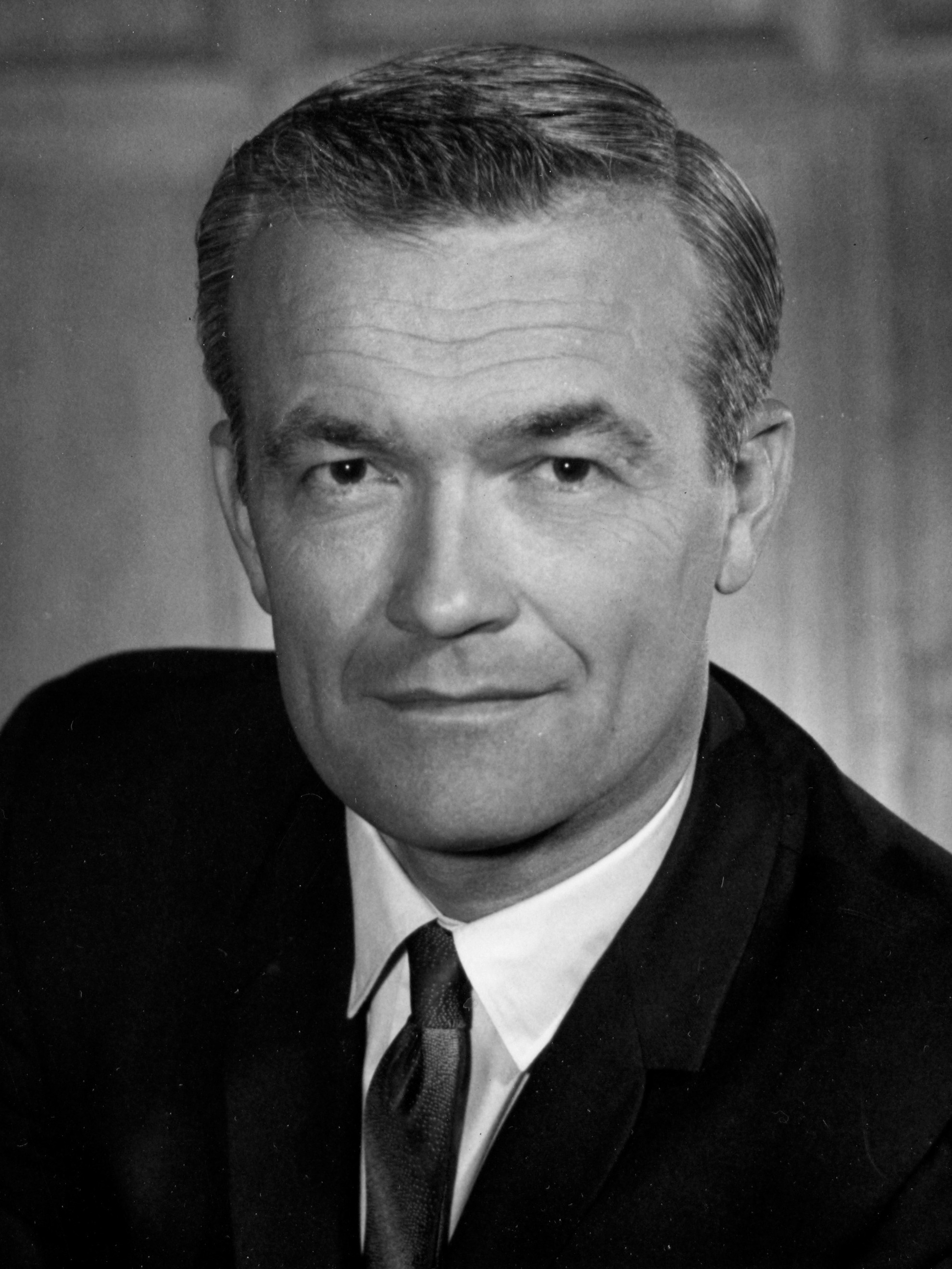
Nominee	Alan Bible	Edward Fike
Party	Democratic	Republican
Popular vote	83,622	69,083
Percentage	54.76%	45.24%
- County results Bible: 50–60% 60–70% Fike: 50–60%
U.S. senator before election
Alan Bible
Democratic
Elected U.S. Senator
Alan Bible
Democratic

Incumbent Alan Bible was originally elected in 1954 in a special election over Republican Ernest S. Brown. He narrowly defeated Republican Clarence Clifton Young in 1956 and won by a landslide in 1962. He defeated Republican Edward Fike by a smaller margin of 55–45 in 1968 in what would be his last term.

1968 U.S. Senate election in Nevada
Party	Candidate	Votes	%
Democratic	Alan Bible (Incumbent)	83,622	54.76
Republican	Edward Fike	69,083	45.24
Majority		14,539	9.52
Turnout		152,705	
Democratic hold			

== New Hampshire ==
1968 United States Senate election in New Hampshire
- November 5, 1968
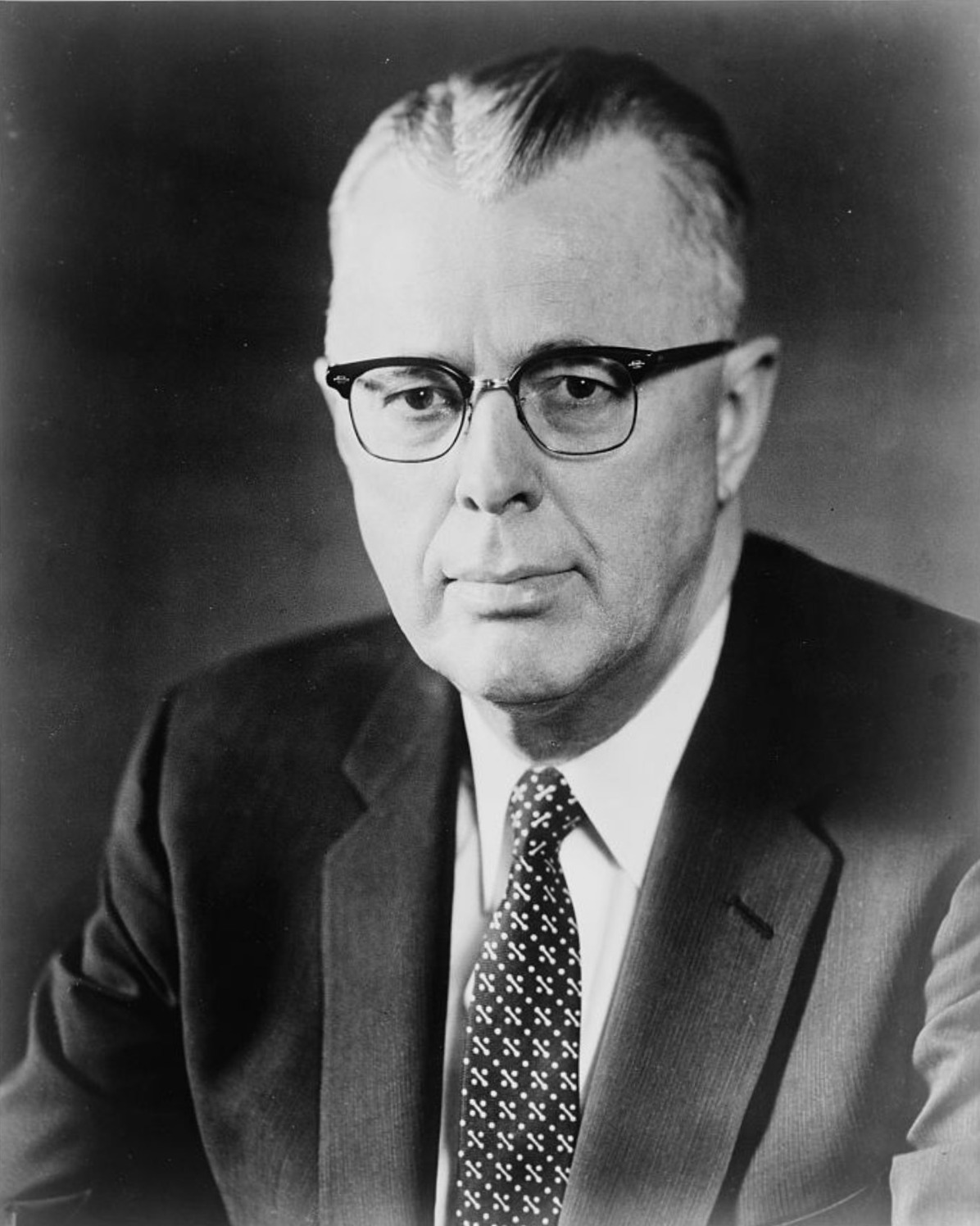

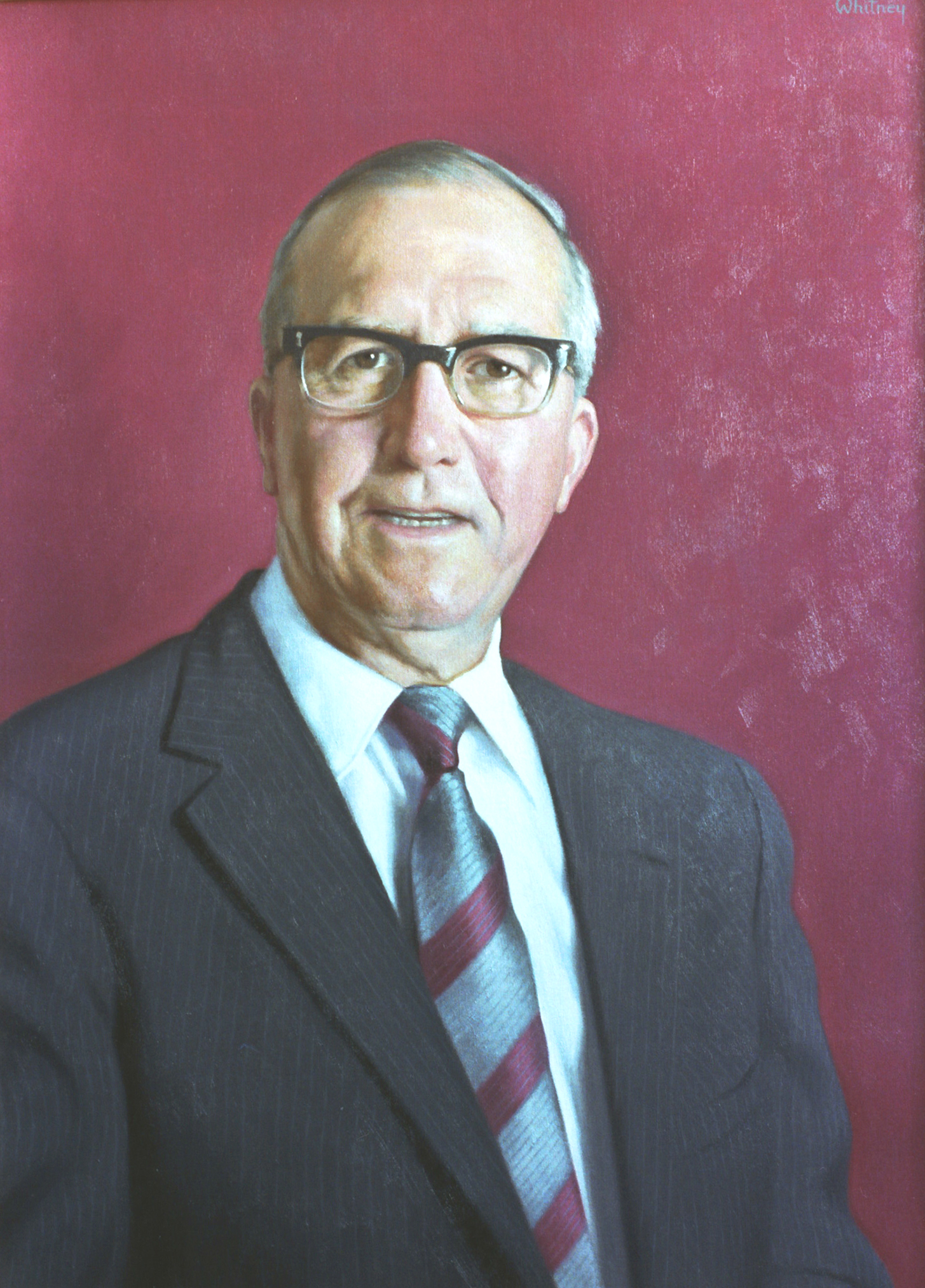
Nominee	Norris Cotton	John W. King
Party	Republican	Democratic
Popular vote	170,163	116,816
Percentage	59.29%	40.70%
- County results Cotton: 50-60% 60-70% 70-80% King: 50–60%
U.S. senator before election
Norris Cotton
Republican
Elected U.S. Senator
Norris Cotton
Republican

Incumbent Norris Cotton handily won re-election against incumbent Governor John W. King in what would be his final term.

1968 U.S. Senate election in New Hampshire
Party	Candidate	Votes	%
Republican	Norris Cotton (Incumbent)	170,163	59.29
Democratic	John W. King	116,816	40.71
Write-in		10	0.00
Majority		53,347	18.59
Turnout		286,989	
Republican hold			

== New York ==
New York election
- November 5, 1968
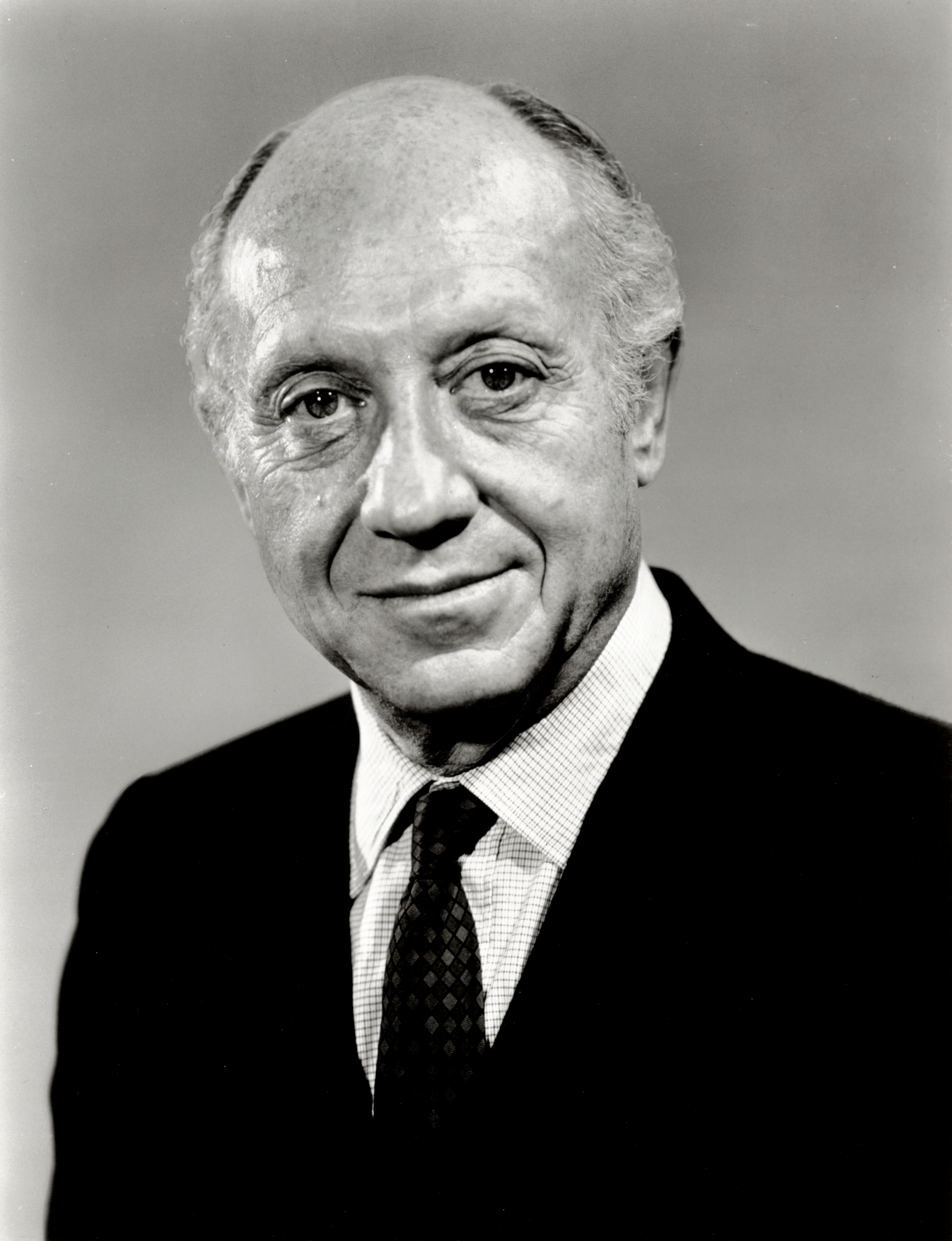

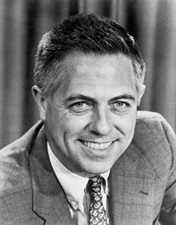
Nominee	Jacob Javits	Paul O'Dwyer	James L. Buckley
Party	Republican	Democratic	Conservative
Popular vote	3,269,772	2,150,695	1,139,402
Percentage	49.68%	32.68%	17.31%
- County results Javits: 30–40% 40–50% 50–60% 60–70% 70–80% O'Dwyer: 40–50%
U.S. senator before election
Jacob Javits
Republican
Elected U.S. senator
Jacob Javits
Republican

Incumbent Republican Jacob Javits won against Democratic challenger Paul O'Dwyer and Conservative Party challenger James L. Buckley in a three-way election.

While Javits did not face any challengers for the Republican nomination, he did face a minor one when seeking the Liberal Party of New York's nomination.

Democratic Party Primary results
Party	Candidate	Votes	%
Democratic	Paul O'Dwyer	275,877	36.14
Democratic	Eugene Nickerson	257,639	33.75
Democratic	Joseph Y. Resnick	229,893	30.11
Total votes		763,409	100.00

Liberal Party Primary results
Party	Candidate	Votes	%
Liberal	Jacob Javits (Incumbent)	10,277	72.14
Liberal	Murray Baron	3,969	27.86
Total votes		14,246	100.00

General election results
Party	Candidate	Votes	%
Republican	Jacob Javits (Incumbent)	2,810,836	
Liberal	Jacob Javits	458,936	
Republican + Liberal Party	Jacob Javits	3,269,772	49.68
Democratic	Paul O'Dwyer	2,150,695	32.68
Conservative	James L. Buckley	1,139,402	17.31
Peace and Freedom	Herman Ferguson	8,775	0.13
Socialist Labor	John Emanuel	7,964	0.12
Socialist Workers	Hedda Garza	4,979	0.08
Majority		1,119,113	17.00
Turnout		6,581,551	39.22
Republican hold			

== North Carolina ==
1968 United States Senate election in North Carolina
- November 5, 1968
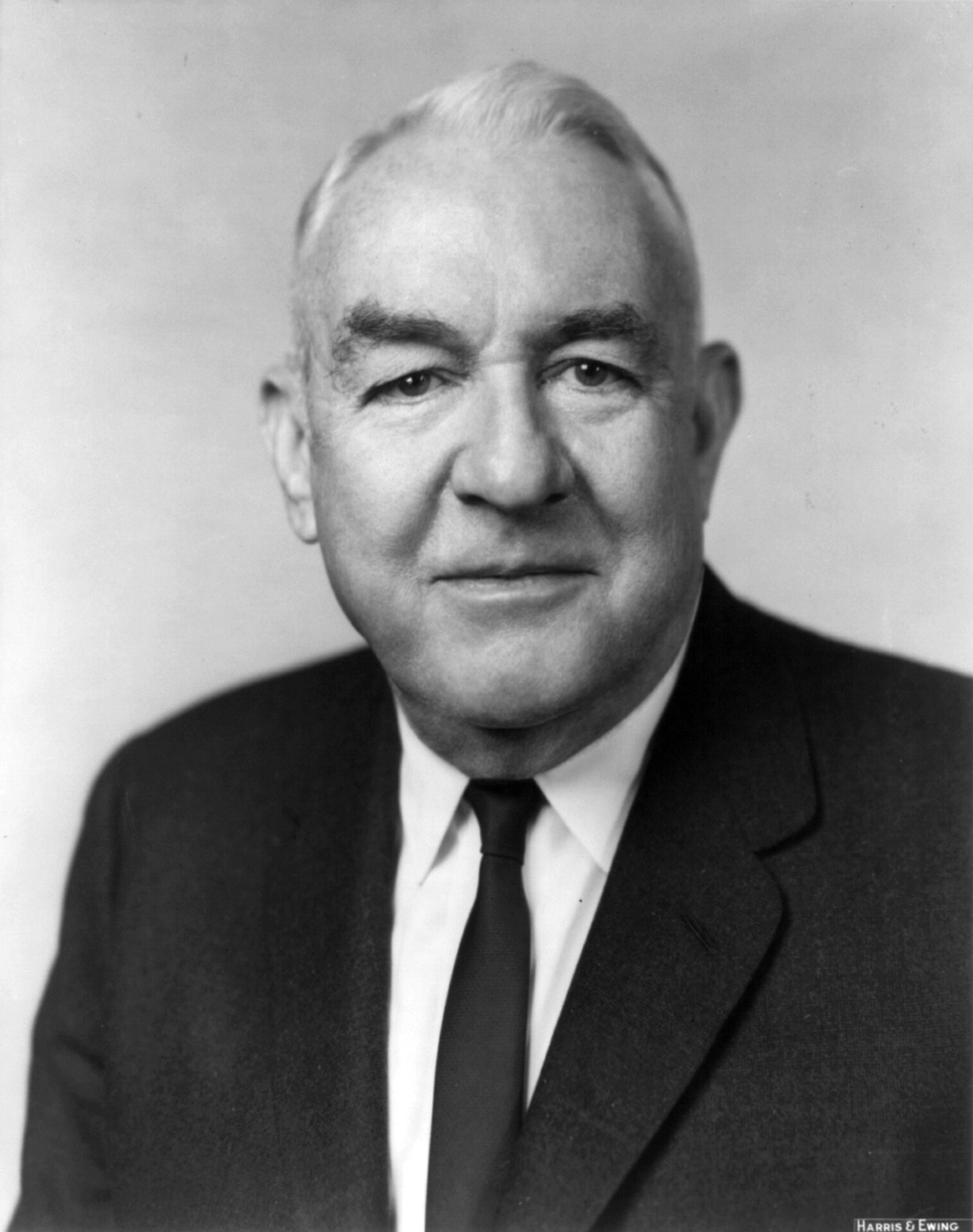

Nominee	Sam Ervin	Robert Somers
Party	Democratic	Republican
Popular vote	870,406	566,834
Percentage	60.56%	39.44%
- County results Ervin: 50–60% 60–70% 70–80% 80–90% >90% Somers: 50–60% 60–70% 70–80%
U.S. senator before election
Sam Ervin
Democratic
Elected U.S. Senator
Sam Ervin
Democratic

The general election was fought between the Democratic incumbent Sam Ervin and the Republican nominee Robert Somers. Ervin won re-election to a third full term, with over 60% of the vote.

The first round of the Primary Election was held on May 4, 1968. The runoff for the Republican Party candidates took place on June 1.

1968 North Carolina U.S. Senate Democratic primary election
Party	Candidate	Votes	%
Democratic	Sam Ervin (incumbent)	499,392	82.12
Democratic	Charles Pratt	60,362	9.90
Democratic	John Gathings	48,357	7.95
Turnout		608,111	

Republican primary – First round
Party	Candidate	Votes	%
Republican	Robert Somers	48,351	36.63
Republican	J. L. Zimmerman	43,644	33.06
Republican	B. E. Sweatt	40,023	30.32
Turnout		132,018	

1968 North Carolina U.S. Senate Republican primary election – Second round
Party	Candidate	Votes	%
Republican	Robert Somers	8,816	60.59
Republican	J. L. Zimmerman	5,734	39.41
Turnout		14,550	

1968 North Carolina U.S. Senate election
Party	Candidate	Votes	%
Democratic	Sam Ervin (Incumbent)	870,406	60.56
Republican	Robert Somers	566,834	39.44
Majority		303,572	21.12
Turnout		901,978	
Democratic hold			

== North Dakota ==
1968 United States Senate election in North Dakota
- November 5, 1968
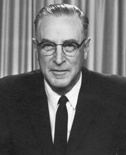

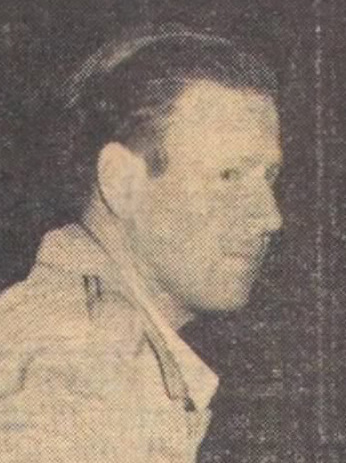
Nominee	Milton Young	Herschel Lashkowitz
Party	Republican	Democratic–NPL
Popular vote	154,968	80,815
Percentage	64.79%	33.79%
- County results Young: 50–60% 60–70% 70–80% 80–90%
U.S. senator before election
Milton Young
Republican
Elected U.S. Senator
Milton Young
Republican

North Dakota Republican Milton Young, sought and received re-election to his fifth term, defeating North Dakota Democratic-NPL Party candidate Herschel Lashkowitz, the mayor of Fargo, North Dakota since 1954.

Only Young filed as a Republican, and the endorsed Democratic candidate was Herschel Lashkowitz of Fargo, North Dakota, who was serving as the mayor of the city since 1954. Young and Lashkowitz won the primary elections for their respective parties.

One independent candidate, Duane Mutch of Larimore, North Dakota, also filed before the deadline. Mutch was later a state senator for the North Dakota Republican Party in the North Dakota Senate from 1959 to 2006 for District 19. He ran as an independent when he did not receive his party's nomination.

1968 U.S. Senate election in North Dakota
Party	Candidate	Votes	%
Republican	Milton R. Young (incumbent)	154,968	64.79
Democratic–NPL	Herschel Lashkowitz	80,815	33.79
Independent	Duane Mutch	3,393	1.42
Turnout		239,176	
Republican hold			

== Ohio ==
1968 United States Senate election in Ohio
- November 5, 1968
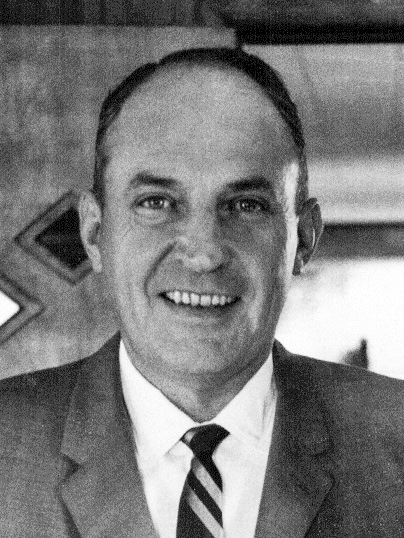

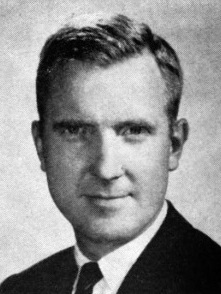
Nominee	William B. Saxbe	John J. Gilligan
Party	Republican	Democratic
Popular vote	1,928,964	1,814,152
Percentage	51.53%	48.47%
- County results Saxbe: 50–60% 60–70% 70–80% Gilligan: 50–60% 60–70%
U.S. senator before election
Frank J. Lausche
Democratic
Elected U.S. Senator
William Saxbe
Republican

Incumbent Democrat Frank J. Lausche ran for re-election but was defeated in the primary by Representative John J. Gilligan, who criticized Lausche's conservative voting record. Republican State Attorney General of Ohio William Saxbe won the Republican primary and defeated Gilligan in the general election by a 51–48 margin. He would not serve out his term after resigning to become United States Attorney general in 1974.

1968 U.S. Senate election in Ohio
Party	Candidate	Votes	%
Republican	William B. Saxbe	1,928,964	51.53
Democratic	John J. Gilligan	1,814,152	48.47
None	Write-Ins	4	0.00
Majority		114,812	3.06
Turnout		3,743,120	
Republican gain from Democratic			

== Oklahoma ==
1968 United States Senate election in Oklahoma
- November 3, 1968
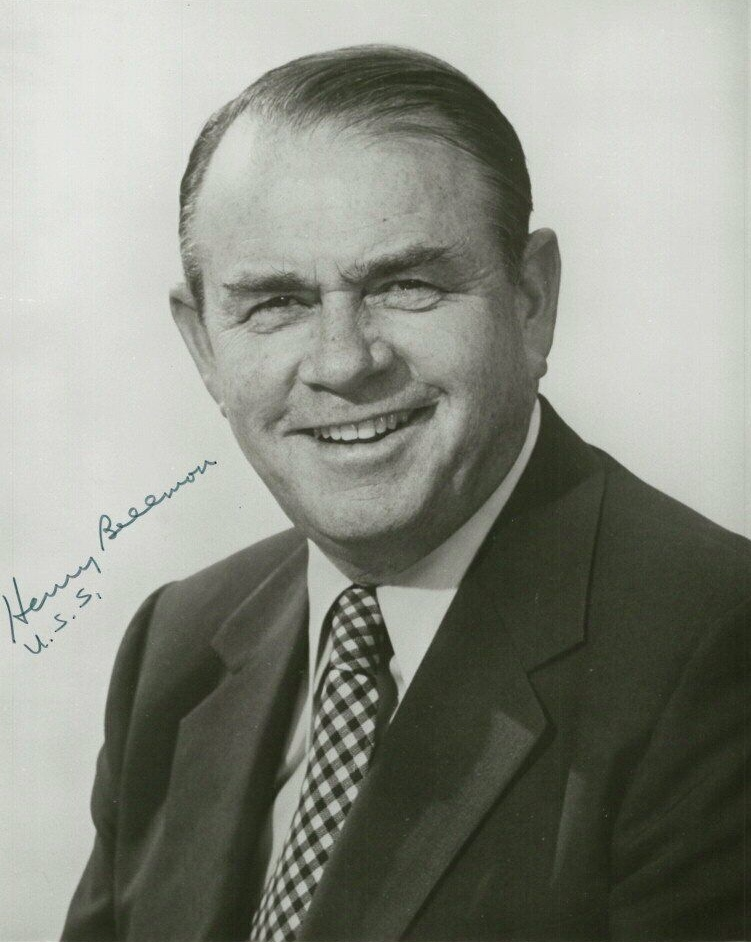

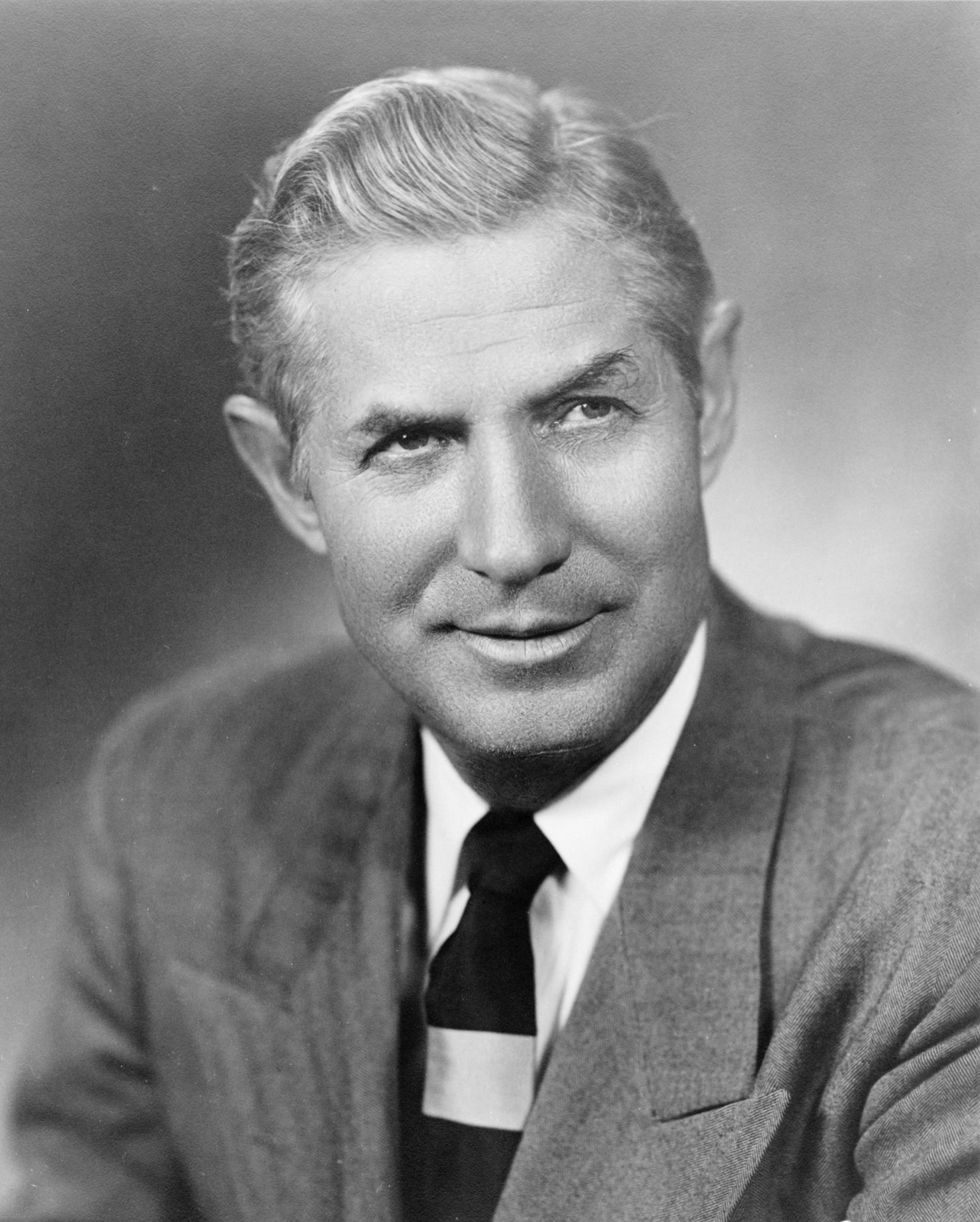
Nominee	Henry Bellmon	Mike Monroney
Party	Republican	Democratic
Popular vote	470,120	419,658
Percentage	51.71%	46.16%
- County results Bellmon: 40-50% 50-60% 60-70% 70-80% Monroney: 40–50% 50–60% 60–70%
U.S. senator before election
Mike Monroney
Democratic
Elected U.S. Senator
Henry Bellmon
Republican

Incumbent Democratic U.S. senator Mike Monroney was running for re-election to a fourth term, but was defeated by Republican former Governor Henry Bellmon.

1968 Oklahoma U.S. Senate Election
Party	Candidate	Votes	%
Republican	Henry Bellmon	470,120	51.7
Democratic	Mike Monroney (Incumbent)	419,658	46.2
American Independent	George Washington	19,341	2.1
Majority		50,462	5.55
Turnout		909,119	
Republican gain from Democratic			

== Oregon ==
1968 United States Senate election in Oregon
- November 5, 1968
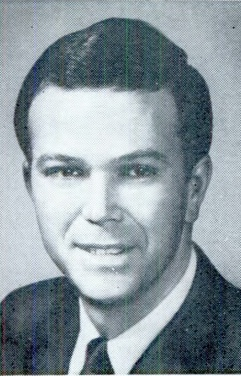

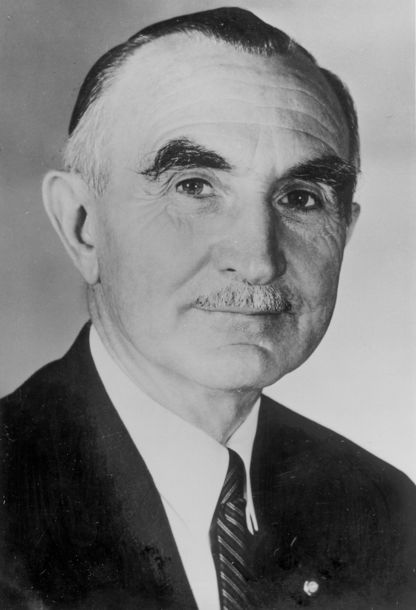
Nominee	Bob Packwood	Wayne Morse
Party	Republican	Democratic
Popular vote	408,646	405,353
Percentage	50.20%	49.80%
- County results Packwood: 50-60% 60-70% Morse: 50–60%
U.S. senator before election
Wayne Morse
Democratic
Elected U.S. Senator
Bob Packwood
Republican

Incumbent Democrat Wayne Morse was seeking a fifth term, but narrowly lost re-election to 36-year-old Republican State Representative Bob Packwood race.

The Democratic primary was held May 28, 1968. Morse defeated former Representative Robert B. Duncan, former U.S. Congressman from Oregon's 4th congressional district (1963–1967), and Phil McAlmond, millionaire and former aide to opponent Robert B. Duncan.

1968 Democratic Senate primary in Oregon
Party	Candidate	Votes	%
Democratic	Wayne Morse (Incumbent)	185,091	49.03
Democratic	Robert B. Duncan	174,795	46.30
Democratic	Phil McAlmond	17,658	4.68
Total votes		377,544	100.00

General election results
Party	Candidate	Votes	%
Republican	Bob Packwood	408,646	50.20
Democratic	Wayne Morse (Incumbent)	405,353	49.80
Total votes		813,999	100.00
Republican gain from Democratic			

== Pennsylvania ==
1968 United States Senate election in Pennsylvania
- November 5, 1968
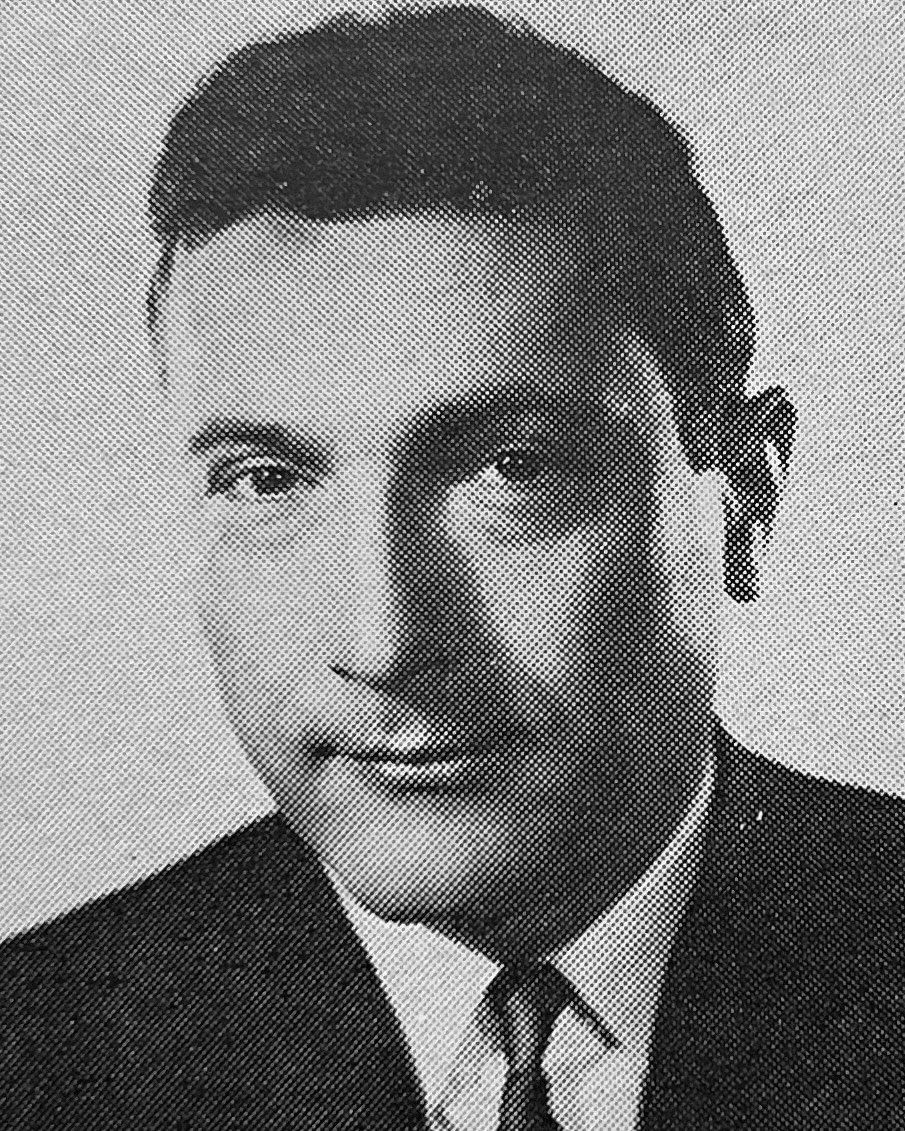

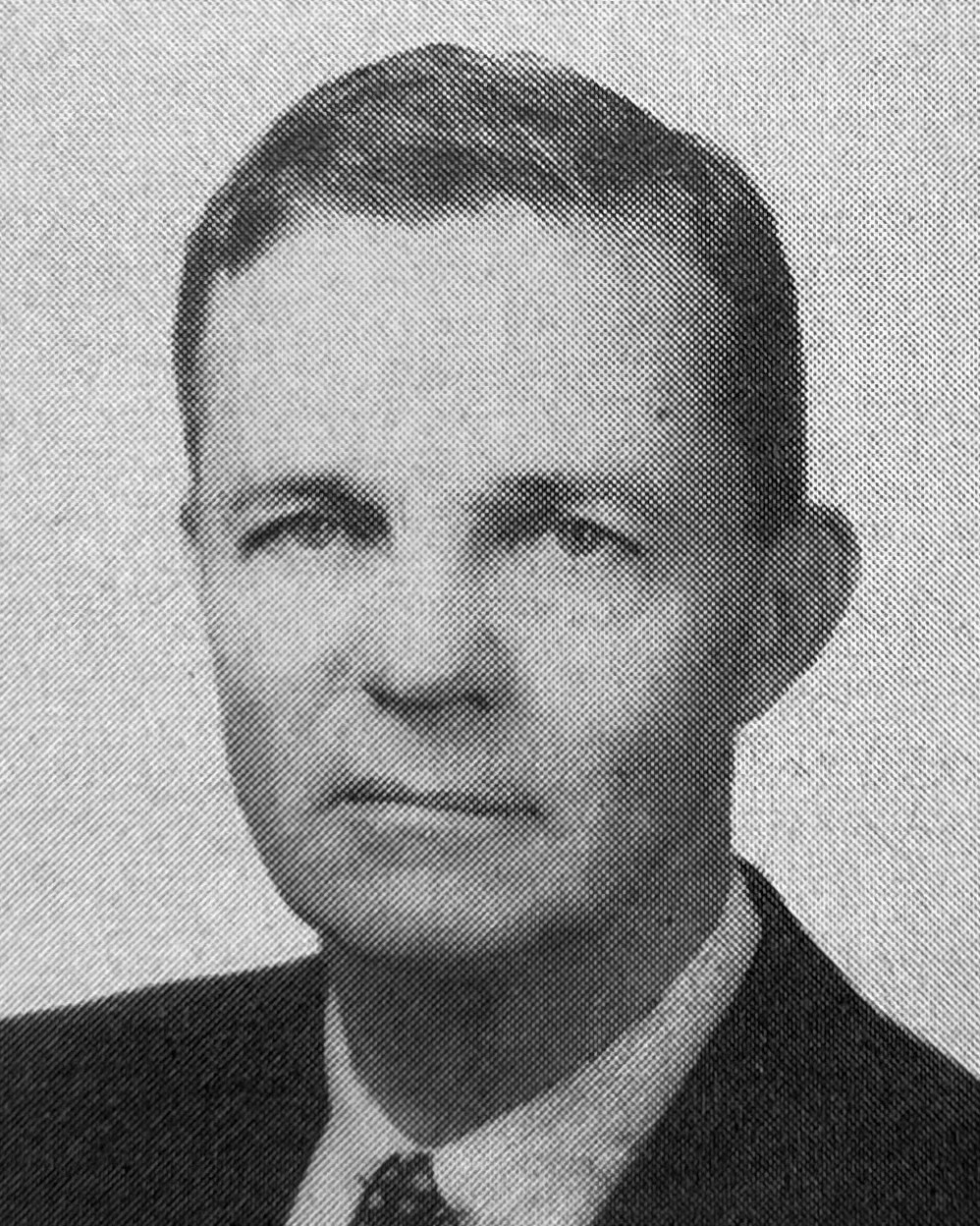
Nominee	Richard Schweiker	Joseph S. Clark Jr.
Party	Republican	Democratic
Popular vote	2,399,762	2,117,662
Percentage	51.90%	45.80%
- County results Schweiker: 40–50% 50–60% 60–70% 70–80% Clark: 50–60% 60–70%
U.S. senator before election
Joseph S. Clark, Jr.
Democratic
Elected U.S. Senator
Richard Schweiker
Republican

Incumbent Democrat Joseph Clark sought re-election to another term, but was defeated by Republican nominee Richard Schweiker, member of the U.S. House of Representatives.

Pennsylvania results
Party	Candidate	Votes	%
Republican	Richard Schweiker	2,399,762	51.90
Democratic	Joseph Clark (Incumbent)	2,117,662	45.80
Constitution	Frank W. Gaydosh	96,742	2.09
Socialist Labor	Benson Perry	7,198	0.16
Socialist Workers	Pearl Chertov	2,743	0.06
Other	Other	111	0.00
Majority		282,100	6.10
Turnout		4,624,218	
Republican gain from Democratic			

== South Carolina ==
1968 United States Senate election in South Carolina
- November 5, 1968
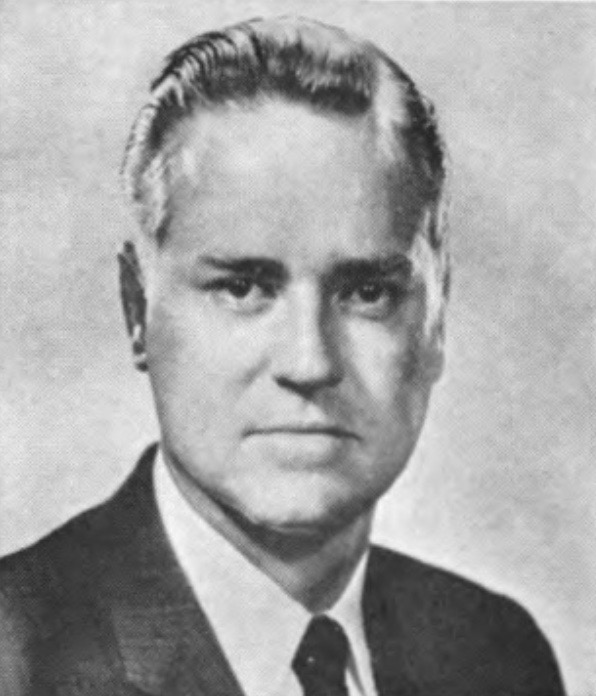

Nominee	Ernest Hollings	Marshall Parker
Party	Democratic	Republican
Popular vote	404,060	248,780
Percentage	61.89%	38.11%
- County results Hollings: 50–60% 60–70% 70–80%
U.S. senator before election
Ernest Hollings
Democratic
Elected U.S. Senator
Ernest Hollings
Democratic

Incumbent Democrat Fritz Hollings easily defeated Republican state senator Marshall Parker in a rematch of the election two years earlier, to win his second (his first full) term.

Hollings faced no opposition from South Carolina Democrats, and avoided a primary election. Marshall Parker, the state senator from Oconee County in the Upstate, was persuaded by South Carolina Republicans to enter the race, and he did not face a primary challenge.

After a close election loss to Fritz Hollings in 1966, the Republicans felt that Parker might have a chance at defeating Hollings by riding Nixon's coattails in the general election. However, the Republicans did not provide Parker with the financial resources to compete, and he subsequently lost by a bigger margin to Hollings than two years prior.

1968 South Carolina U.S. Senate Election
Party	Candidate	Votes	%
Democratic	Fritz Hollings (incumbent)	404,060	61.9
Republican	Marshall Parker	248,780	38.1
Write-in	Write-Ins	15	0.0
Majority		155,280	23.8
Turnout		652,855	76.5
Democratic hold			

== South Dakota ==
1968 United States Senate election in South Dakota
- November 5, 1968
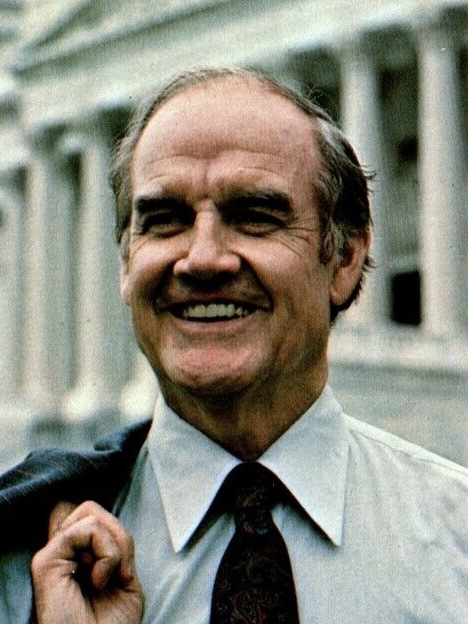

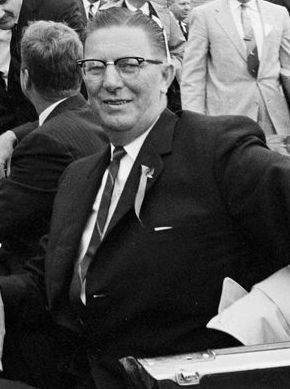
Nominee	George McGovern	Archie M. Gubbrud
Party	Democratic	Republican
Popular vote	158,961	120,951
Percentage	56.79%	43.21%
- County results McGovern: 50–60% 60–70% 70–80% Gubbrud: 50–60% 70–80%
U.S. senator before election
George McGovern
Democratic
Elected U.S. Senator
George McGovern
Democratic

Incumbent Democrat George McGovern had flirted with presidential aspirations in 1968 but ultimately decided to run for re-election, defeating Republican Archie M. Gubbrud by a comfortable margin.

1968 U.S. Senate election in South Dakota
Party	Candidate	Votes	%
Democratic	George McGovern (Incumbent)	158,961	56.79
Republican	Archie M. Gubbrud	120,951	43.21
Majority		38,010	13.58
Turnout		279,912	
Democratic hold			

== Utah ==
1968 United States Senate election in Utah
- November 5, 1968
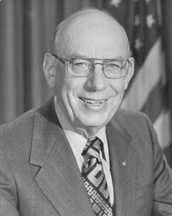

Nominee	Wallace F. Bennett	Milton L. Weilenmann
Party	Republican	Democratic
Popular vote	225,075	192,168
Percentage	53.68%	45.83%
- County results Bennett: 50–60% 60–70% 70–80% Weilenmann: 40–50% 50–60% 60–70% Tie: 40–50%
U.S. senator before election
Wallace F. Bennett
Republican
Elected U.S. Senator
Wallace F. Bennett
Republican

Incumbent Wallace F. Bennett, a Republican, won re-election to a fourth term in the U.S. Senate by a comfortable margin against Democrat Milton Weilemann.

1968 U.S. Senate election in Utah
Party	Candidate	Votes	%
Republican	Wallace F. Bennett (Incumbent)	225,075	53.68
Democratic	Milton N. Weilenmann	192,168	45.83
Peace and Freedom	Utah Phillips	2,019	0.48
Majority		32,907	7.85
Turnout		419,262	
Republican hold			

== Vermont ==
1968 United States Senate election in Vermont
- November 5, 1968
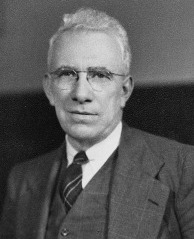
Nominee	George Aiken
Party	Republican
Alliance	Democratic
Popular vote	157,197
Percentage	99.89%
- County results Aiken: 90–100%
U.S. senator before election
George Aiken
Republican
Elected U.S. Senator
George Aiken
Republican

Incumbent Republican George Aiken ran successfully for re-election to another term in the United States Senate. Vermont voted Democratic for the first time since the 1850s for Lyndon B. Johnson in 1964. Vermont also elected Democrat Philip H. Hoff in 1962, and he served until 1969. Hoff ran a write-in campaign in the Democratic primary for this seat but lost to Republican Aiken by a wide margin. Aiken thus ran with both nominations and secured a victory. This would be once staunchly-Republican Vermont's last time to support a Republican for this seat. In 1974, Patrick Leahy would win and become the first Democratic Senator from Vermont.

Republican primary results
Party	Candidate	Votes	%
Republican	George Aiken (Incumbent)	42,248	72.8
Republican	William K. Tufts	15,786	27.2
Republican	Other	28	0.0
Total votes		58,062	100.0

Democratic primary results
Party	Candidate	Votes	%
Write-In	George Aiken (Incumbent)	1,534	61.8
Write-In	Philip H. Hoff	400	18.2
Democratic	Other	438	20.0
Total votes		2,192	100.0

1968 U.S. Senate election in Vermont
Party	Candidate	Votes	%
Republican	George Aiken (Incumbent)	94,738	60.2
Democratic	George Aiken (Incumbent)	62,416	39.7
Independent	George Aiken (Incumbent)	43	0.0
Republican + Democratic + Independent	George Aiken (Incumbent)	157,197	99.9
N/A	Other	178	0.1
Total votes		157,375	100.0
Republican hold			

== Washington ==
1968 United States Senate election in Washington
- November 5, 1968
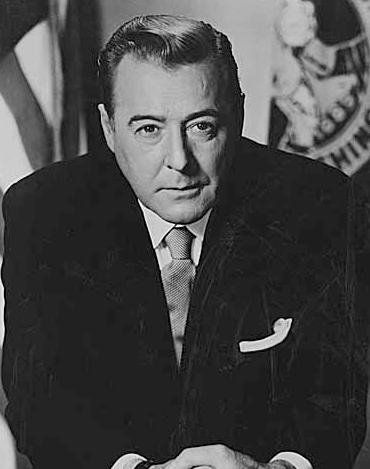

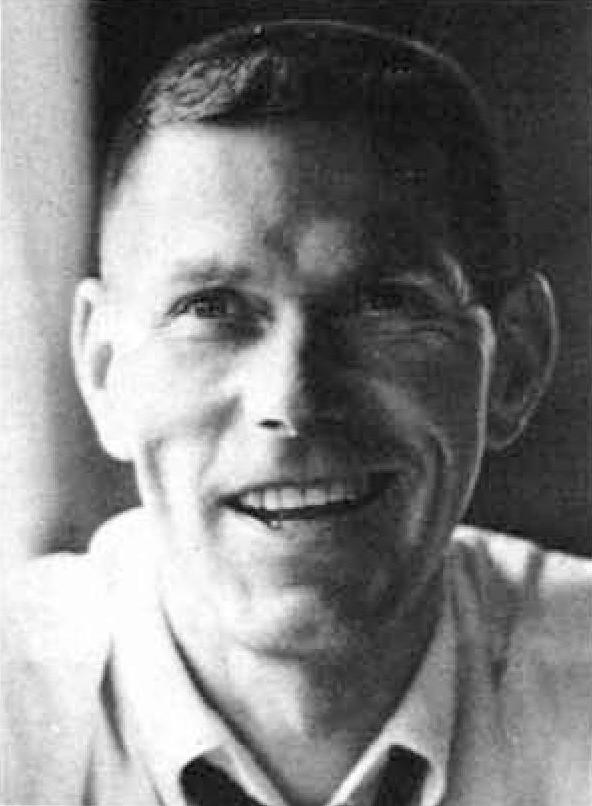
Nominee	Warren Magnuson	Jack Metcalf
Party	Democratic	Republican
Popular vote	796,183	435,894
Percentage	64.41%	35.26%
- County results Magnuson: 50–60% 60–70% 70–80% Metcalf: 50–60%
U.S. senator before election
Warren Magnuson
Democratic
Elected U.S. Senator
Warren Magnuson
Democratic

Incumbent Warren G. Magnuson won re-election by a wide margin against his Republican opponent Metcalf.

1968 U.S. Senate election in Washington
Party	Candidate	Votes	%
Democratic	Warren G. Magnuson (Incumbent)	796,183	64.41
Republican	Jack Metcalf	435,894	35.26
New Party	Irwin R. Hogenauer	2,762	0.22
Socialist Workers	Debbie Leonard	1,224	0.10
Majority		360,289	29.15
Turnout		1,236,063	
Democratic hold			

== Wisconsin ==
Wisconsin election
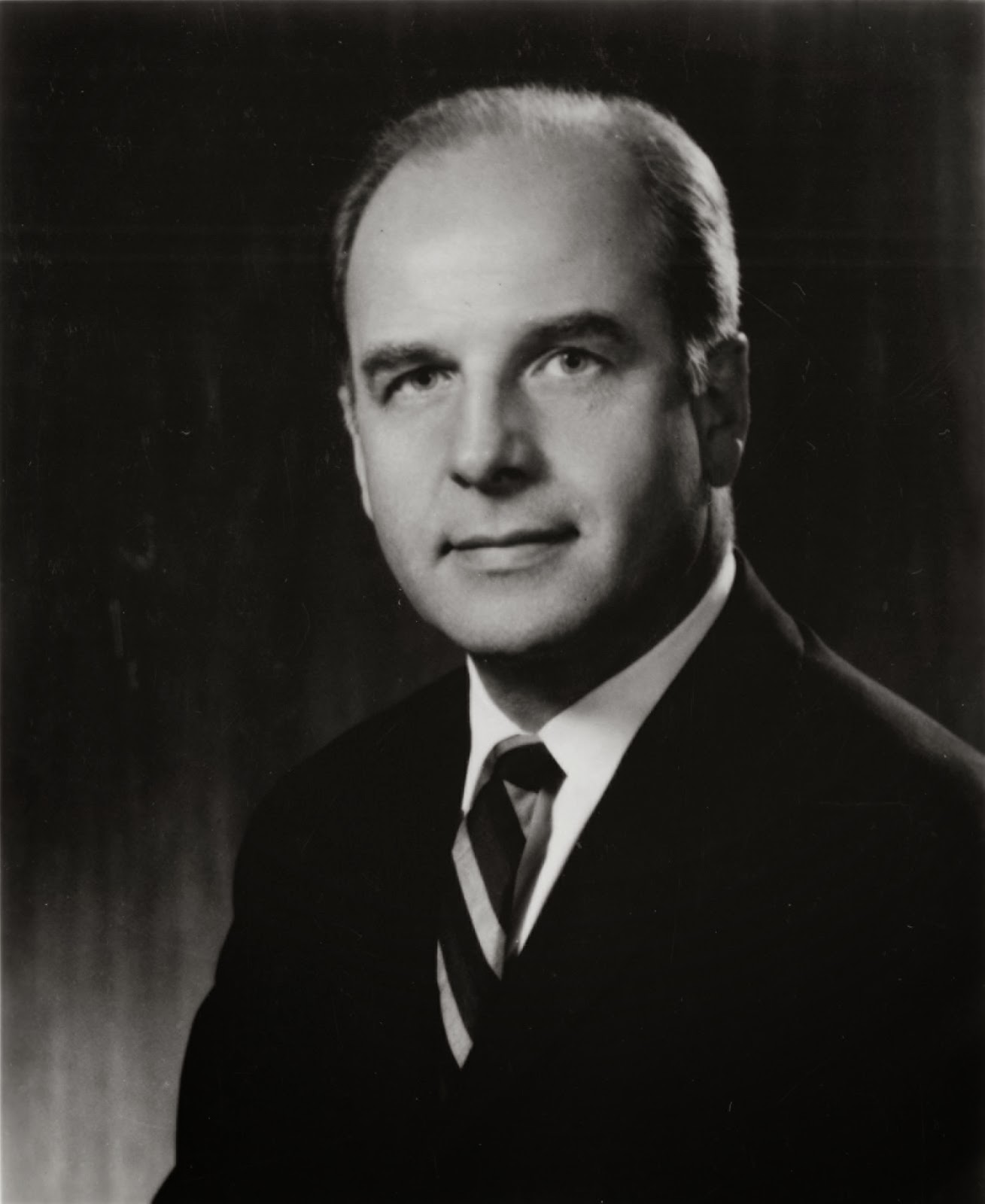

Nominee	Gaylord Nelson	Jerris Leonard
Party	Democratic	Republican
Popular vote	1,020,931	633,910
Percentage	61.69%	38.31%
- County results Nelson: 50–60% 60–70% 70–80% 80–90% Leonard: 50-60%
U.S. senator before election
Gaylord Nelson
Democratic
Elected U.S. Senator
Gaylord Nelson
Democratic

Incumbent Democrat Gaylord A. Nelson (U.S. senator since 1963) defeated Republican State Senator Jerris Leonard.

General election results
Party	Candidate	Votes	%
Democratic	Gaylord Nelson (Incumbent)	1,020,931	61.69
Republican	Jerris Leonard	633,910	38.31
Write-in	Write-ins	20	0.00
Majority		387,021	23.38
Turnout		1,654,861	
Democratic hold			

== See also ==
- 1968 United States elections
  - 1968 United States gubernatorial elections
  - 1968 United States presidential election
  - 1968 United States House of Representatives elections
- 90th United States Congress
- 91st United States Congress
