= 1962 United States Senate election in Vermont =

- November 6, 1962
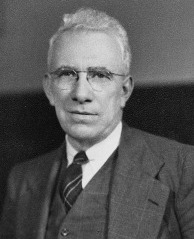

Nominee	George Aiken	W. Robert Johnson
Party	Republican	Democratic
Popular vote	81,241	40,134
Percentage	66.83%	33.17%
- County results Aiken: 50–60% 60–70% 70–80%
U.S. senator before election
George Aiken
Republican
Elected U.S. Senator
George Aiken
Republican

The 1962 United States Senate election in Vermont took place on November 6, 1962. Incumbent Republican George Aiken ran successfully for re-election to another term in the United States Senate, defeating Democratic nominee W. Robert Johnson.

As Aiken was nominated by the Democratic party in the next election for this seat, as of 2024, this is the last time the Democratic candidate lost the election for the Class 3 Senate Seat in Vermont. And the last time a republican won a contested Class 3 senate senate.

== Republican primary ==
=== Results ===
Republican primary results
Party	Candidate	Votes	%	±%
Republican	George Aiken (inc.)	30,320	99.9%	
Republican	Other	35	0.1%	
Total votes		30,355	100.0%	

== Democratic primary ==
=== Results ===
Democratic primary results
Party	Candidate	Votes	%	±%
Democratic	W. Robert Johnson	5,718	54.6%	
Democratic	William H. Meyer	4,741	45.3%	
Democratic	Other	13	0.1%	
Total votes		10,472	100.0%	

== General election ==
=== Results ===
United States Senate election in Vermont, 1962
Party	Candidate	Votes	%	±%
Republican	George Aiken (inc.)	81,241	66.83%	+0.44%
Democratic	W. Robert Johnson	40,134	33.17%	−0.44%
Total votes		121,571	100.00%	
