= 1932 United States Senate election in Vermont =

1932 United States Senate Election in Vermont
- November 8, 1932
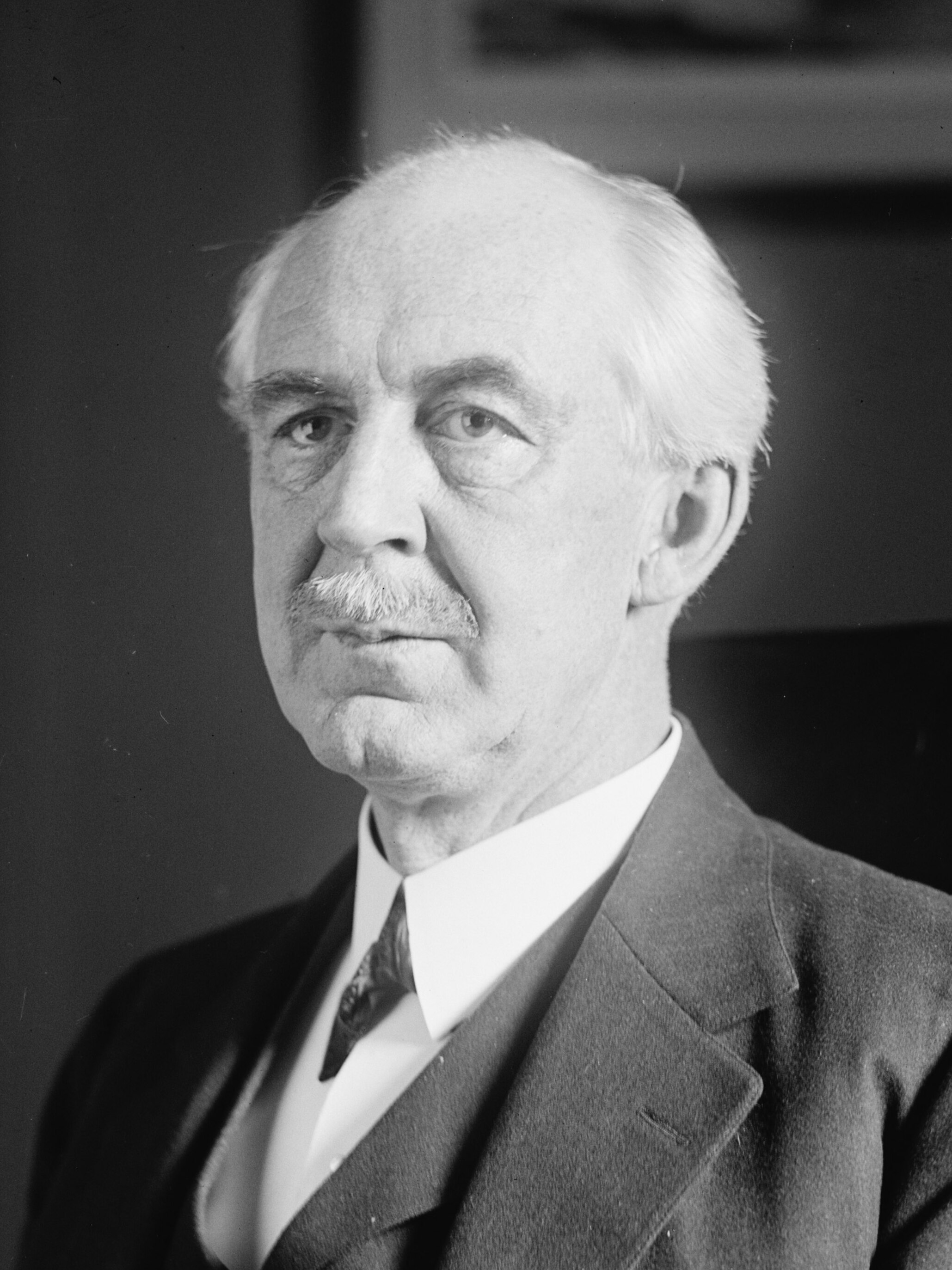

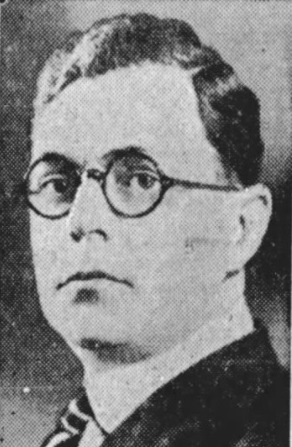
Nominee	Porter H. Dale	Fred C. Martin
Party	Republican	Democratic
Popular vote	74,319	60,455
Percentage	55.14%	44.86%
- Dale: 50–60% 60–70% 70–80% 80–90% >90% Martin: 50–60% 60–70% 70–80% 80–90%
U.S. senator before election
Porter H. Dale
Republican
Elected U.S. Senator
Porter H. Dale
Republican

The 1932 United States Senate election in Vermont took place on November 8, 1932. Republican Porter H. Dale successfully ran for re-election to another term in the United States Senate, defeating Democratic candidate Fred C. Martin. Dale died in October 1933, vacating the seat until a special election was held in January 1934.

== Republican primary ==
=== Results ===
Republican primary results
Party	Candidate	Votes	%	±%
Republican	Porter H. Dale (inc.)	68,465	99.8%	
Republican	Others	158	0.2%	
Total votes		68,623	100.0%	

== Democratic primary ==
=== Results ===
Democratic primary results
Party	Candidate	Votes	%	±%
Democratic	Fred C. Martin	4,030	99.7%	
Democratic	Other	14	0.3%	
Total votes		4,044	100.0%	

== General election ==
=== Results ===
United States Senate election in Vermont, 1932
Party	Candidate	Votes	%	±%
Republican	Porter H. Dale (inc.)	74,319	55.14%	−15.62%
Democratic	Fred C. Martin	60,455	44.86%	+18.34%
Total votes		134,774	100.00%	

== See also ==
- United States Senate elections, 1932 and 1933
