= Talmadge-Aiken plants =

Talmadge-Aiken plants (Federal-State Cooperative Inspection Plants) are meat and poultry plants in the United States in which state agency inspectors perform federal safety inspections.

This arrangement was established under the Talmadge-Aiken Act of 1962, named after US Senators Herman Talmadge and George Aiken.

There are approximately 250 Talmadge-Aiken plants in 10 states. For these plants, the US Department of Agriculture (USDA) has contracted with state governments to perform the federal inspections. Even though state employees conduct the inspections, they are considered to be under the federal rather than state inspection.
