= 1936 Vermont gubernatorial election =

- November 3, 1936
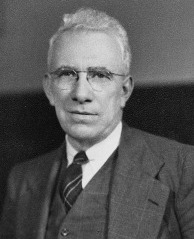

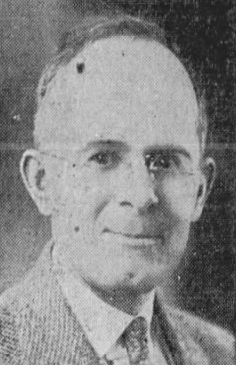
Nominee	George Aiken	Alfred Heininger
Party	Republican	Democratic
Popular vote	83,602	53,218
Percentage	60.89%	38.76%
- Aiken: 50–60% 60–70% 70–80% 80–90% 90-100% Heininger: 50–60% 60–70% 70–80% 90–100% Tie: 50% No Vote/Data
Governor before election
Charles M. Smith
Republican
Elected Governor
George Aiken
Republican

The 1936 Vermont gubernatorial election took place on November 3, 1936. Incumbent Governor Charles Manley Smith did not seek reelection to a second term after falling ill; he would later be charged with fraud. Republican candidate George Aiken defeated Democratic candidate Alfred H. Heininger to become the 64th Governor of Vermont.

== Republican primary ==
=== Results ===
Republican primary results
Party	Candidate	Votes	%	±%
Republican	George Aiken	23,584	42.2	
Republican	H. Nelson Jackson	19,162	34.3	
Republican	Ernest E. Moore	11,917	21.3	
Republican	John Reid	1,228	2.2	
Republican	Others	2	0.0	
Total votes		55,893	100	

== Democratic primary ==
=== Results ===
Democratic primary results
Party	Candidate	Votes	%	±%
Democratic	Alfred H. Heininger	5,378	99.4	
Democratic	Others	35	0.6	
Total votes		5,413	100	

== General election ==
=== Results ===
1936 Vermont gubernatorial election
Party	Candidate	Votes	%	±%
Republican	George Aiken	83,602	60.89	
Democratic	Alfred H. Heininger	53,218	38.76	
Communist	Fred Gardner	463	0.34	
N/A	Others	8	0.01	
Total votes		137,291	100	
