= 1938 United States Senate election in Vermont =

- November 8, 1938
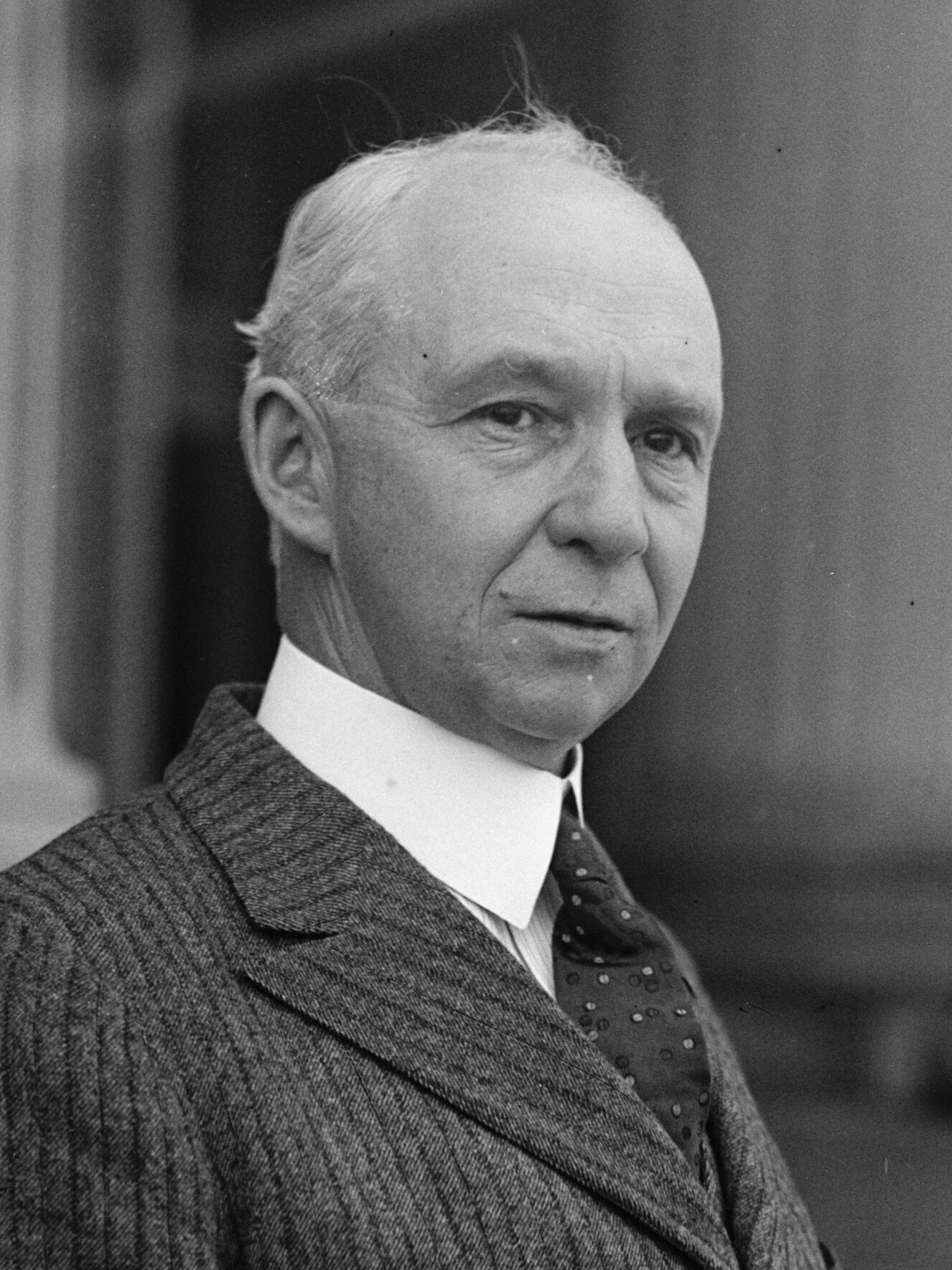

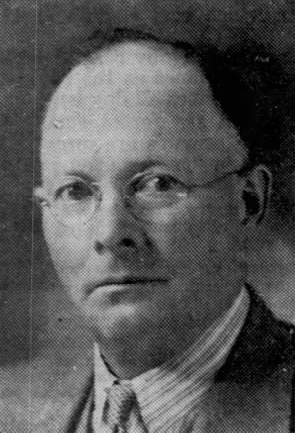
Nominee	Ernest W. Gibson Sr.	John McGrath
Party	Republican	Democratic
Popular vote	73,990	38,673
Percentage	65.67%	34.33%
U.S. senator before election
Ernest W. Gibson Sr.
Republican
Elected U.S. Senator
Ernest W. Gibson Sr.
Republican

The 1938 United States Senate election in Vermont took place on November 8, 1938. Republican Ernest W. Gibson Sr. successfully ran for re-election to another term in the United States Senate, defeating Democratic candidate John McGrath. Gibson Sr. died in June 1940 and his son, Ernest W. Gibson Jr., was appointed to fill the seat until a special election could be held in November 1940.

== Republican primary ==
=== Results ===
Republican primary results
Party	Candidate	Votes	%	±%
Republican	Ernest W. Gibson, Sr. (inc.)	38,872	81.8%	
Republican	Martin S. Vilas	8,630	18.2%	
Republican	Other	14	0.0%	
Total votes		47,516	100.0%	

== Democratic primary ==
=== Results ===
Democratic primary results
Party	Candidate	Votes	%	±%
Democratic	John McGrath	4,931	99.9%	
Democratic	Other	6	0.1%	
Total votes		4,937	100.0%	

== General election ==
=== Candidates ===
- Ernest W. Gibson Sr. (Republican), incumbent U.S. Senator
- John McGrath (Democratic), state senator, milk farmer and businessman

=== Results ===
United States Senate election in Vermont, 1938
Party	Candidate	Votes	%	±%
Republican	Ernest W. Gibson, Sr. (inc.)	73,990	65.67%	+7.44%
Democratic	John McGrath	38,673	34.33%	−7.41%
Total votes		112,663	100.00%	
