= List of United States senators from Vermont =

Current delegation

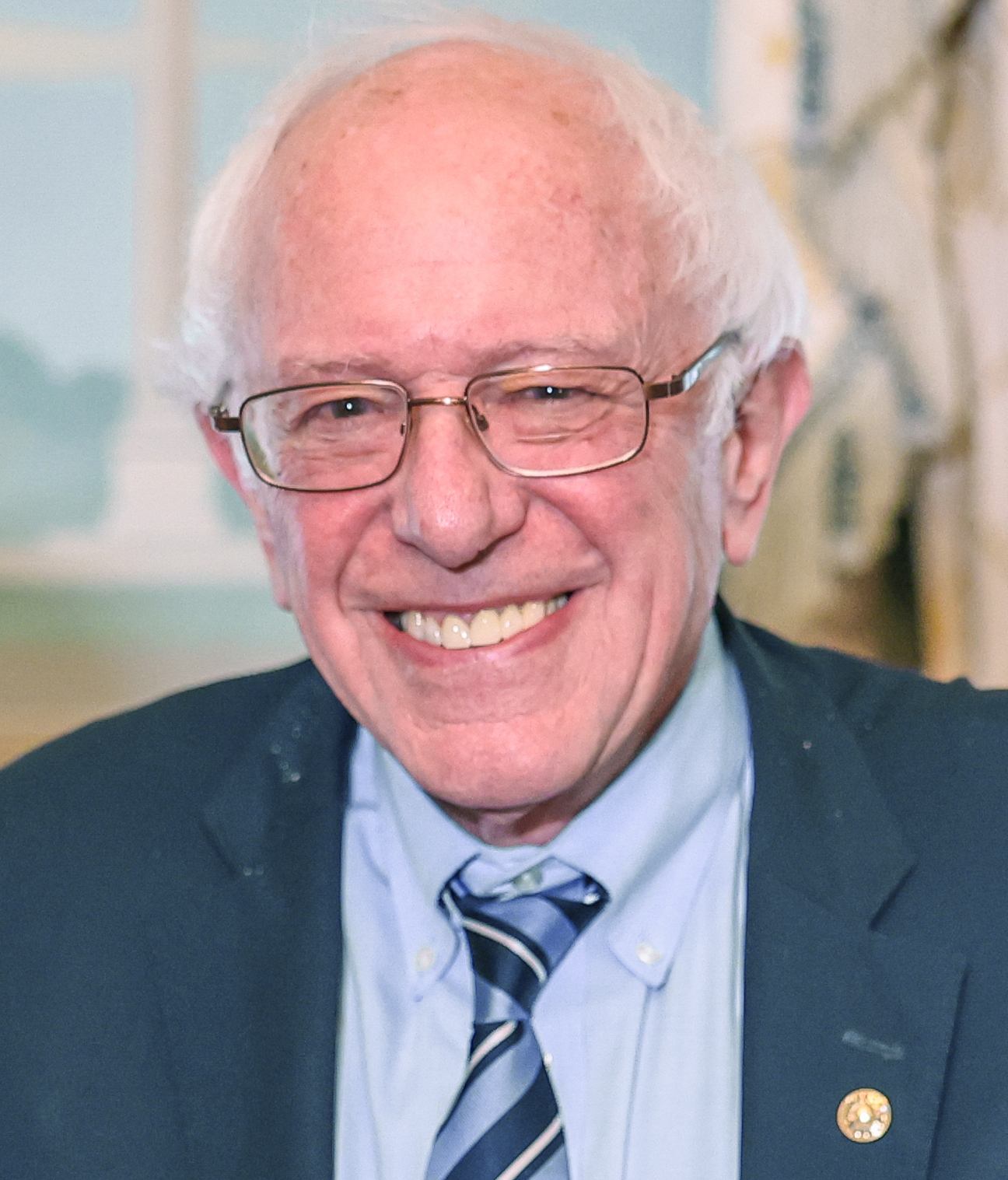
Bernie Sanders (I)

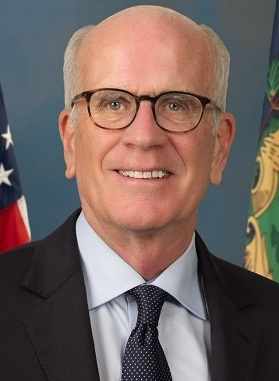
Peter Welch (D)

(ordered by seniority)

Vermont was admitted to the Union on March 4, 1791. From the 1850s until well into the 20th century, Vermont was always represented by members of the Republican Party. Democrat Patrick Leahy (served 1975–2023) was Vermont's longest serving U.S. senator. Its current U.S. senators are independent Bernie Sanders (since 2007) and Democrat Peter Welch (since 2023). Both senators served in the United States House of Representatives immediately prior, where they represented Vermont's only House district.

== List of senators ==
Class 1 Class 1 senators belong to the electoral cycle that most recently had regular elections in 2006, 2012, 2018, and 2024. The next election will be in 2030.						C	Class 3 Class 3 senators belong to the electoral cycle that most recently had regular elections in 2004, 2010, 2016, and 2022. The next election will be in 2028.					
#	Senator	Party	Dates in office	Electoral history	T	C	T	Electoral history	Dates in office	Party	Senator	#
Vacant			Mar 4, 1791 – Oct 17, 1791	Vermont elected its senators several months after statehood.	1	2nd	1	Vermont elected its senators several months after statehood.	Mar 4, 1791 – Oct 17, 1791	Vacant		
1	Moses Robinson (Bennington)	Anti- Admin.	Oct 17, 1791 – Oct 15, 1796	Elected in 1791. Resigned.	1	2nd	1	Elected in 1791. Lost re-election.	Oct 17, 1791 – Mar 3, 1795	Anti- Admin.	Stephen R. Bradley (Westminster)	1
1	Moses Robinson (Bennington)	Anti- Admin.	Oct 17, 1791 – Oct 15, 1796	Elected in 1791. Resigned.	1	3rd	1	Elected in 1791. Lost re-election.	Oct 17, 1791 – Mar 3, 1795	Anti- Admin.	Stephen R. Bradley (Westminster)	1
1	Moses Robinson (Bennington)	Democratic- Republican	Oct 17, 1791 – Oct 15, 1796	Elected in 1791. Resigned.	1	4th	2	Elected in 1794.	Mar 4, 1795 – Sep 1, 1801	Federalist	Elijah Paine (Williamstown)	2
Vacant			Oct 15, 1796 – Oct 18, 1796		1	4th	2	Elected in 1794.	Mar 4, 1795 – Sep 1, 1801	Federalist	Elijah Paine (Williamstown)	2
2	Isaac Tichenor (Bennington)	Federalist	Oct 18, 1796 – Oct 17, 1797	Elected in 1796 to finish Robinson's term.	1	4th	2	Elected in 1794.	Mar 4, 1795 – Sep 1, 1801	Federalist	Elijah Paine (Williamstown)	2
2	Isaac Tichenor (Bennington)	Federalist	Oct 18, 1796 – Oct 17, 1797	Elected in 1796 to full term. Resigned to become Governor of Vermont.	2	5th	2	Elected in 1794.	Mar 4, 1795 – Sep 1, 1801	Federalist	Elijah Paine (Williamstown)	2
3	Nathaniel Chipman (Tinmouth)	Federalist	Oct 17, 1797 – Mar 3, 1803	Elected in 1797 to finish Tichenor's term. Lost re-election.	2	5th	2	Elected in 1794.	Mar 4, 1795 – Sep 1, 1801	Federalist	Elijah Paine (Williamstown)	2
3	Nathaniel Chipman (Tinmouth)	Federalist	Oct 17, 1797 – Mar 3, 1803	Elected in 1797 to finish Tichenor's term. Lost re-election.	2	6th	2	Elected in 1794.	Mar 4, 1795 – Sep 1, 1801	Federalist	Elijah Paine (Williamstown)	2
3	Nathaniel Chipman (Tinmouth)	Federalist	Oct 17, 1797 – Mar 3, 1803	Elected in 1797 to finish Tichenor's term. Lost re-election.	2	7th	3	Re-elected in 1800. Resigned.	Mar 4, 1795 – Sep 1, 1801	Federalist	Elijah Paine (Williamstown)	2
3	Nathaniel Chipman (Tinmouth)	Federalist	Oct 17, 1797 – Mar 3, 1803	Elected in 1797 to finish Tichenor's term. Lost re-election.	2	7th	3		Sep 1, 1801 – Oct 15, 1801	Vacant		
3	Nathaniel Chipman (Tinmouth)	Federalist	Oct 17, 1797 – Mar 3, 1803	Elected in 1797 to finish Tichenor's term. Lost re-election.	2	7th	3	Elected to finish Paine's term.	Oct 15, 1801 – Mar 3, 1813	Democratic- Republican	Stephen R. Bradley (Westminster)	3
4	Israel Smith (Rutland)	Democratic- Republican	Mar 4, 1803 – Oct 1, 1807	Elected in 1802. Resigned.	3	8th	3	Elected to finish Paine's term.	Oct 15, 1801 – Mar 3, 1813	Democratic- Republican	Stephen R. Bradley (Westminster)	3
4	Israel Smith (Rutland)	Democratic- Republican	Mar 4, 1803 – Oct 1, 1807	Elected in 1802. Resigned.	3	9th	3	Elected to finish Paine's term.	Oct 15, 1801 – Mar 3, 1813	Democratic- Republican	Stephen R. Bradley (Westminster)	3
4	Israel Smith (Rutland)	Democratic- Republican	Mar 4, 1803 – Oct 1, 1807	Elected in 1802. Resigned.	3	10th	4	Re-elected in 1806. Retired.	Oct 15, 1801 – Mar 3, 1813	Democratic- Republican	Stephen R. Bradley (Westminster)	3
Vacant			Oct 1, 1807 – Oct 10, 1807		3	10th	4	Re-elected in 1806. Retired.	Oct 15, 1801 – Mar 3, 1813	Democratic- Republican	Stephen R. Bradley (Westminster)	3
5	Jonathan Robinson (Bennington)	Democratic- Republican	Oct 10, 1807 – Mar 3, 1815	Elected to finish Smith's term.	3	10th	4	Re-elected in 1806. Retired.	Oct 15, 1801 – Mar 3, 1813	Democratic- Republican	Stephen R. Bradley (Westminster)	3
5	Jonathan Robinson (Bennington)	Democratic- Republican	Oct 10, 1807 – Mar 3, 1815	Re-elected in 1808. Retired.	4	11th	4	Re-elected in 1806. Retired.	Oct 15, 1801 – Mar 3, 1813	Democratic- Republican	Stephen R. Bradley (Westminster)	3
5	Jonathan Robinson (Bennington)	Democratic- Republican	Oct 10, 1807 – Mar 3, 1815	Re-elected in 1808. Retired.	4	12th	4	Re-elected in 1806. Retired.	Oct 15, 1801 – Mar 3, 1813	Democratic- Republican	Stephen R. Bradley (Westminster)	3
5	Jonathan Robinson (Bennington)	Democratic- Republican	Oct 10, 1807 – Mar 3, 1815	Re-elected in 1808. Retired.	4	13th	5	Elected in 1812. Resigned.	Mar 4, 1813 – Nov 3, 1817	Democratic- Republican	Dudley Chase (Randolph)	4
6	Isaac Tichenor (Bennington)	Federalist	Mar 4, 1815 – Mar 3, 1821	Elected in 1814. Retired.	5	14th	5	Elected in 1812. Resigned.	Mar 4, 1813 – Nov 3, 1817	Democratic- Republican	Dudley Chase (Randolph)	4
6	Isaac Tichenor (Bennington)	Federalist	Mar 4, 1815 – Mar 3, 1821	Elected in 1814. Retired.	5	15th	5	Elected in 1812. Resigned.	Mar 4, 1813 – Nov 3, 1817	Democratic- Republican	Dudley Chase (Randolph)	4
6	Isaac Tichenor (Bennington)	Federalist	Mar 4, 1815 – Mar 3, 1821	Elected in 1814. Retired.	5	15th	5	Elected to finish Chase's term. Resigned to serve as collector of customs for the district of Vermont.	Nov 4, 1817 – Jan 8, 1818	Democratic- Republican	James Fisk (Barre)	5
6	Isaac Tichenor (Bennington)	Federalist	Mar 4, 1815 – Mar 3, 1821	Elected in 1814. Retired.	5	15th	5		Jan 8, 1818 – Oct 20, 1818	Vacant		
6	Isaac Tichenor (Bennington)	Federalist	Mar 4, 1815 – Mar 3, 1821	Elected in 1814. Retired.	5	15th	5	Elected to finish Chase's term.	Oct 20, 1818 – Mar 3, 1825	Democratic- Republican	William A. Palmer (Danville)	6
6	Isaac Tichenor (Bennington)	Federalist	Mar 4, 1815 – Mar 3, 1821	Elected in 1814. Retired.	5	16th	6	Elected in 1818 to the following term. Retired.	Oct 20, 1818 – Mar 3, 1825	Democratic- Republican	William A. Palmer (Danville)	6
7	Horatio Seymour (Middlebury)	Democratic- Republican	Mar 4, 1821 – Mar 3, 1833	Elected in 1821.	6	17th	6	Elected in 1818 to the following term. Retired.	Oct 20, 1818 – Mar 3, 1825	Democratic- Republican	William A. Palmer (Danville)	6
7	Horatio Seymour (Middlebury)	Democratic- Republican	Mar 4, 1821 – Mar 3, 1833	Elected in 1821.	6	18th	6	Elected in 1818 to the following term. Retired.	Oct 20, 1818 – Mar 3, 1825	Democratic- Republican	William A. Palmer (Danville)	6
7	Horatio Seymour (Middlebury)	National; Republican	Mar 4, 1821 – Mar 3, 1833	Elected in 1821.	6	19th	7	Elected in 1825. Declined to run for reelection.	Mar 4, 1825 – Mar 3, 1831	National; Republican	Dudley Chase (Randolph)	7
7	Horatio Seymour (Middlebury)	National; Republican	Mar 4, 1821 – Mar 3, 1833	Re-elected in 1827. Retired to run for Governor of Vermont	7	20th	7	Elected in 1825. Declined to run for reelection.	Mar 4, 1825 – Mar 3, 1831	National; Republican	Dudley Chase (Randolph)	7
7	Horatio Seymour (Middlebury)	National; Republican	Mar 4, 1821 – Mar 3, 1833	Re-elected in 1827. Retired to run for Governor of Vermont	7	21st	7	Elected in 1825. Declined to run for reelection.	Mar 4, 1825 – Mar 3, 1831	National; Republican	Dudley Chase (Randolph)	7
7	Horatio Seymour (Middlebury)	National; Republican	Mar 4, 1821 – Mar 3, 1833	Re-elected in 1827. Retired to run for Governor of Vermont	7	22nd	8	Elected in 1831.	Mar 4, 1831 – Apr 11, 1842	National; Republican	Samuel Prentiss (Montpelier)	8
8	Benjamin Swift (St. Albans)	National; Republican	Mar 4, 1833 – Mar 3, 1839	Elected in 1833. Retired.	8	23rd	8	Elected in 1831.	Mar 4, 1831 – Apr 11, 1842	National; Republican	Samuel Prentiss (Montpelier)	8
8	Benjamin Swift (St. Albans)	National; Republican	Mar 4, 1833 – Mar 3, 1839	Elected in 1833. Retired.	8	24th	8	Elected in 1831.	Mar 4, 1831 – Apr 11, 1842	National; Republican	Samuel Prentiss (Montpelier)	8
8	Benjamin Swift (St. Albans)	Whig	Mar 4, 1833 – Mar 3, 1839	Elected in 1833. Retired.	8	25th	9	Re-elected in 1837. Resigned.	Mar 4, 1831 – Apr 11, 1842	Whig	Samuel Prentiss (Montpelier)	8
9	Samuel S. Phelps (Middlebury)	Whig	Mar 4, 1839 – Mar 3, 1851	Elected in 1839.	9	26th	9	Re-elected in 1837. Resigned.	Mar 4, 1831 – Apr 11, 1842	Whig	Samuel Prentiss (Montpelier)	8
9	Samuel S. Phelps (Middlebury)	Whig	Mar 4, 1839 – Mar 3, 1851	Elected in 1839.	9	27th	9	Re-elected in 1837. Resigned.	Mar 4, 1831 – Apr 11, 1842	Whig	Samuel Prentiss (Montpelier)	8
9	Samuel S. Phelps (Middlebury)	Whig	Mar 4, 1839 – Mar 3, 1851	Elected in 1839.	9	27th	9		Apr 11, 1842 – Apr 23, 1842	Vacant		
9	Samuel S. Phelps (Middlebury)	Whig	Mar 4, 1839 – Mar 3, 1851	Elected in 1839.	9	27th	9	Appointed to continue Prentiss's term. Elected in 1842 to finish Prentiss's term. Retired.	Apr 23, 1842 – Mar 3, 1843	Whig	Samuel C. Crafts (Craftsbury)	9
9	Samuel S. Phelps (Middlebury)	Whig	Mar 4, 1839 – Mar 3, 1851	Elected in 1839.	9	28th	10	Elected in 1843.	Mar 4, 1843 – Jan 14, 1853	Whig	William Upham (Montpelier)	10
9	Samuel S. Phelps (Middlebury)	Whig	Mar 4, 1839 – Mar 3, 1851	Re-elected in 1845. Lost re-election.	10	29th	10	Elected in 1843.	Mar 4, 1843 – Jan 14, 1853	Whig	William Upham (Montpelier)	10
9	Samuel S. Phelps (Middlebury)	Whig	Mar 4, 1839 – Mar 3, 1851	Re-elected in 1845. Lost re-election.	10	30th	10	Elected in 1843.	Mar 4, 1843 – Jan 14, 1853	Whig	William Upham (Montpelier)	10
9	Samuel S. Phelps (Middlebury)	Whig	Mar 4, 1839 – Mar 3, 1851	Re-elected in 1845. Lost re-election.	10	31st	11	Re-elected in 1848. Died.	Mar 4, 1843 – Jan 14, 1853	Whig	William Upham (Montpelier)	10
10	Solomon Foot (Rutland)	Whig	Mar 4, 1851 – Mar 28, 1866	Elected in 1850.	11	32nd	11	Re-elected in 1848. Died.	Mar 4, 1843 – Jan 14, 1853	Whig	William Upham (Montpelier)	10
10	Solomon Foot (Rutland)	Whig	Mar 4, 1851 – Mar 28, 1866	Elected in 1850.	11	32nd	11		Jan 14, 1853 – Jan 17, 1853	Vacant		
10	Solomon Foot (Rutland)	Whig	Mar 4, 1851 – Mar 28, 1866	Elected in 1850.	11	32nd	11	Appointed to continue Upham's term. Lost entitlement to sit. (Note: Samuel S. Phelps was appointed by the governor during a recess of the state legislature, and the legislature later convened and adjourned a session without electing a senator to replace fill the vacancy. The Senate ruled that Phelps had lost his entitlement to sit when the legislature adjourned.)	Jan 17, 1853 – Mar 16, 1854	Whig	Samuel S. Phelps (Middlebury)	11
10	Solomon Foot (Rutland)	Whig	Mar 4, 1851 – Mar 28, 1866	Elected in 1850.	11	33rd	11	Appointed to continue Upham's term. Lost entitlement to sit.	Jan 17, 1853 – Mar 16, 1854	Whig	Samuel S. Phelps (Middlebury)	11
10	Solomon Foot (Rutland)	Whig	Mar 4, 1851 – Mar 28, 1866	Elected in 1850.	11	33rd	11		Mar 16, 1854 – Oct 14, 1854	Vacant		
10	Solomon Foot (Rutland)	Whig	Mar 4, 1851 – Mar 28, 1866	Elected in 1850.	11	33rd	11	Elected to finish Upham's term. Retired.	Oct 14, 1854 – Mar 3, 1855	Free Soil	Lawrence Brainerd (St. Albans)	12
10	Solomon Foot (Rutland)	Republican	Mar 4, 1851 – Mar 28, 1866	Elected in 1850.	11	34th	12	Elected in 1855.	Mar 4, 1855 – Nov 9, 1865	Republican	Jacob Collamer (Woodstock)	13
10	Solomon Foot (Rutland)	Republican	Mar 4, 1851 – Mar 28, 1866	Re-elected in 1856.	12	35th	12	Elected in 1855.	Mar 4, 1855 – Nov 9, 1865	Republican	Jacob Collamer (Woodstock)	13
10	Solomon Foot (Rutland)	Republican	Mar 4, 1851 – Mar 28, 1866	Re-elected in 1856.	12	36th	12	Elected in 1855.	Mar 4, 1855 – Nov 9, 1865	Republican	Jacob Collamer (Woodstock)	13
10	Solomon Foot (Rutland)	Republican	Mar 4, 1851 – Mar 28, 1866	Re-elected in 1856.	12	37th	13	Re-elected in 1860. Died.	Mar 4, 1855 – Nov 9, 1865	Republican	Jacob Collamer (Woodstock)	13
10	Solomon Foot (Rutland)	Republican	Mar 4, 1851 – Mar 28, 1866	Re-elected in 1862. Died.	13	38th	13	Re-elected in 1860. Died.	Mar 4, 1855 – Nov 9, 1865	Republican	Jacob Collamer (Woodstock)	13
10	Solomon Foot (Rutland)	Republican	Mar 4, 1851 – Mar 28, 1866	Re-elected in 1862. Died.	13	39th	13	Re-elected in 1860. Died.	Mar 4, 1855 – Nov 9, 1865	Republican	Jacob Collamer (Woodstock)	13
10	Solomon Foot (Rutland)	Republican	Mar 4, 1851 – Mar 28, 1866	Re-elected in 1862. Died.	13	39th	13		Nov 9, 1865 – Nov 21, 1865	Vacant		
10	Solomon Foot (Rutland)	Republican	Mar 4, 1851 – Mar 28, 1866	Re-elected in 1862. Died.	13	39th	13	Appointed to continue Collamer's term. Elected in 1866 to finish Collamer's term. Lost re-election.	Nov 21, 1865 – Mar 3, 1867	Republican	Luke P. Poland (St. Johnsbury)	14
Vacant			Mar 28, 1866 – Apr 3, 1866		13	39th	13	Appointed to continue Collamer's term. Elected in 1866 to finish Collamer's term. Lost re-election.	Nov 21, 1865 – Mar 3, 1867	Republican	Luke P. Poland (St. Johnsbury)	14
11	George F. Edmunds (Burlington)	Republican	Apr 3, 1866 – Nov 1, 1891	Appointed to continue Foot's term. Elected in 1866 to finish Foot's term.	13	39th	13	Appointed to continue Collamer's term. Elected in 1866 to finish Collamer's term. Lost re-election.	Nov 21, 1865 – Mar 3, 1867	Republican	Luke P. Poland (St. Johnsbury)	14
11	George F. Edmunds (Burlington)	Republican	Apr 3, 1866 – Nov 1, 1891	Appointed to continue Foot's term. Elected in 1866 to finish Foot's term.	13	40th	14	Elected in 1866.	Mar 4, 1867 – Dec 28, 1898	Republican	Justin S. Morrill (Strafford)	15
11	George F. Edmunds (Burlington)	Republican	Apr 3, 1866 – Nov 1, 1891	Re-elected in 1868.	14	41st	14	Elected in 1866.	Mar 4, 1867 – Dec 28, 1898	Republican	Justin S. Morrill (Strafford)	15
11	George F. Edmunds (Burlington)	Republican	Apr 3, 1866 – Nov 1, 1891	Re-elected in 1868.	14	42nd	14	Elected in 1866.	Mar 4, 1867 – Dec 28, 1898	Republican	Justin S. Morrill (Strafford)	15
11	George F. Edmunds (Burlington)	Republican	Apr 3, 1866 – Nov 1, 1891	Re-elected in 1868.	14	43rd	15	Re-elected in 1872.	Mar 4, 1867 – Dec 28, 1898	Republican	Justin S. Morrill (Strafford)	15
11	George F. Edmunds (Burlington)	Republican	Apr 3, 1866 – Nov 1, 1891	Re-elected in 1874.	15	44th	15	Re-elected in 1872.	Mar 4, 1867 – Dec 28, 1898	Republican	Justin S. Morrill (Strafford)	15
11	George F. Edmunds (Burlington)	Republican	Apr 3, 1866 – Nov 1, 1891	Re-elected in 1874.	15	45th	15	Re-elected in 1872.	Mar 4, 1867 – Dec 28, 1898	Republican	Justin S. Morrill (Strafford)	15
11	George F. Edmunds (Burlington)	Republican	Apr 3, 1866 – Nov 1, 1891	Re-elected in 1874.	15	46th	16	Re-elected in 1878.	Mar 4, 1867 – Dec 28, 1898	Republican	Justin S. Morrill (Strafford)	15
11	George F. Edmunds (Burlington)	Republican	Apr 3, 1866 – Nov 1, 1891	Re-elected in 1880.	16	47th	16	Re-elected in 1878.	Mar 4, 1867 – Dec 28, 1898	Republican	Justin S. Morrill (Strafford)	15
11	George F. Edmunds (Burlington)	Republican	Apr 3, 1866 – Nov 1, 1891	Re-elected in 1880.	16	48th	16	Re-elected in 1878.	Mar 4, 1867 – Dec 28, 1898	Republican	Justin S. Morrill (Strafford)	15
11	George F. Edmunds (Burlington)	Republican	Apr 3, 1866 – Nov 1, 1891	Re-elected in 1880.	16	49th	17	Re-elected in 1884.	Mar 4, 1867 – Dec 28, 1898	Republican	Justin S. Morrill (Strafford)	15
11	George F. Edmunds (Burlington)	Republican	Apr 3, 1866 – Nov 1, 1891	Re-elected in 1886. Resigned to start a law practice.	17	50th	17	Re-elected in 1884.	Mar 4, 1867 – Dec 28, 1898	Republican	Justin S. Morrill (Strafford)	15
11	George F. Edmunds (Burlington)	Republican	Apr 3, 1866 – Nov 1, 1891	Re-elected in 1886. Resigned to start a law practice.	17	51st	17	Re-elected in 1884.	Mar 4, 1867 – Dec 28, 1898	Republican	Justin S. Morrill (Strafford)	15
11	George F. Edmunds (Burlington)	Republican	Apr 3, 1866 – Nov 1, 1891	Re-elected in 1886. Resigned to start a law practice.	17	52nd	18	Re-elected in 1890.	Mar 4, 1867 – Dec 28, 1898	Republican	Justin S. Morrill (Strafford)	15
12	Redfield Proctor (Proctor)	Republican	Nov 2, 1891 – Mar 4, 1908	Appointed to continue Edmunds's term. Elected in 1892 to finish Edmunds's term.	17	52nd	18	Re-elected in 1890.	Mar 4, 1867 – Dec 28, 1898	Republican	Justin S. Morrill (Strafford)	15
12	Redfield Proctor (Proctor)	Republican	Nov 2, 1891 – Mar 4, 1908	Re-elected in 1892.	18	53rd	18	Re-elected in 1890.	Mar 4, 1867 – Dec 28, 1898	Republican	Justin S. Morrill (Strafford)	15
12	Redfield Proctor (Proctor)	Republican	Nov 2, 1891 – Mar 4, 1908	Re-elected in 1892.	18	54th	18	Re-elected in 1890.	Mar 4, 1867 – Dec 28, 1898	Republican	Justin S. Morrill (Strafford)	15
12	Redfield Proctor (Proctor)	Republican	Nov 2, 1891 – Mar 4, 1908	Re-elected in 1892.	18	55th	19	Re-elected in 1896. Died.	Mar 4, 1867 – Dec 28, 1898	Republican	Justin S. Morrill (Strafford)	15
12	Redfield Proctor (Proctor)	Republican	Nov 2, 1891 – Mar 4, 1908	Re-elected in 1892.	18	55th	19		Dec 28, 1898 – Jan 11, 1899	Vacant		
12	Redfield Proctor (Proctor)	Republican	Nov 2, 1891 – Mar 4, 1908	Re-elected in 1892.	18	55th	19	Appointed to continue Morrill's term. Retired when successor elected.	Jan 11, 1899 – Oct 18, 1900	Republican	Jonathan Ross (St. Johnsbury)	16
12	Redfield Proctor (Proctor)	Republican	Nov 2, 1891 – Mar 4, 1908	Re-elected in 1898.	19	56th	19	Appointed to continue Morrill's term. Retired when successor elected.	Jan 11, 1899 – Oct 18, 1900	Republican	Jonathan Ross (St. Johnsbury)	16
12	Redfield Proctor (Proctor)	Republican	Nov 2, 1891 – Mar 4, 1908	Re-elected in 1898.	19	56th	19	Elected to finish Morrill's term.	Oct 18, 1900 – Jul 12, 1923	Republican	William P. Dillingham (Montpelier)	17
12	Redfield Proctor (Proctor)	Republican	Nov 2, 1891 – Mar 4, 1908	Re-elected in 1898.	19	57th	19	Elected to finish Morrill's term.	Oct 18, 1900 – Jul 12, 1923	Republican	William P. Dillingham (Montpelier)	17
12	Redfield Proctor (Proctor)	Republican	Nov 2, 1891 – Mar 4, 1908	Re-elected in 1898.	19	58th	20	Re-elected in 1902.	Oct 18, 1900 – Jul 12, 1923	Republican	William P. Dillingham (Montpelier)	17
12	Redfield Proctor (Proctor)	Republican	Nov 2, 1891 – Mar 4, 1908	Re-elected in 1904. Died.	20	59th	20	Re-elected in 1902.	Oct 18, 1900 – Jul 12, 1923	Republican	William P. Dillingham (Montpelier)	17
12	Redfield Proctor (Proctor)	Republican	Nov 2, 1891 – Mar 4, 1908	Re-elected in 1904. Died.	20	60th	20	Re-elected in 1902.	Oct 18, 1900 – Jul 12, 1923	Republican	William P. Dillingham (Montpelier)	17
Vacant			Mar 4, 1908 – Mar 24, 1908		20	60th	20	Re-elected in 1902.	Oct 18, 1900 – Jul 12, 1923	Republican	William P. Dillingham (Montpelier)	17
13	John W. Stewart (Middlebury)	Republican	Mar 24, 1908 – Oct 21, 1908	Appointed to continue Proctor's term. Retired.	20	60th	20	Re-elected in 1902.	Oct 18, 1900 – Jul 12, 1923	Republican	William P. Dillingham (Montpelier)	17
14	Carroll S. Page (Hyde Park)	Republican	Oct 21, 1908 – Mar 3, 1923	Elected to finish Proctor's term.	20	60th	20	Re-elected in 1902.	Oct 18, 1900 – Jul 12, 1923	Republican	William P. Dillingham (Montpelier)	17
14	Carroll S. Page (Hyde Park)	Republican	Oct 21, 1908 – Mar 3, 1923	Elected to finish Proctor's term.	20	61st	21	Re-elected in 1908.	Oct 18, 1900 – Jul 12, 1923	Republican	William P. Dillingham (Montpelier)	17
14	Carroll S. Page (Hyde Park)	Republican	Oct 21, 1908 – Mar 3, 1923	Re-elected in 1910.	21	62nd	21	Re-elected in 1908.	Oct 18, 1900 – Jul 12, 1923	Republican	William P. Dillingham (Montpelier)	17
14	Carroll S. Page (Hyde Park)	Republican	Oct 21, 1908 – Mar 3, 1923	Re-elected in 1910.	21	63rd	21	Re-elected in 1908.	Oct 18, 1900 – Jul 12, 1923	Republican	William P. Dillingham (Montpelier)	17
14	Carroll S. Page (Hyde Park)	Republican	Oct 21, 1908 – Mar 3, 1923	Re-elected in 1910.	21	64th	22	Re-elected in 1914.	Oct 18, 1900 – Jul 12, 1923	Republican	William P. Dillingham (Montpelier)	17
14	Carroll S. Page (Hyde Park)	Republican	Oct 21, 1908 – Mar 3, 1923	Re-elected in 1916. Retired.	22	65th	22	Re-elected in 1914.	Oct 18, 1900 – Jul 12, 1923	Republican	William P. Dillingham (Montpelier)	17
14	Carroll S. Page (Hyde Park)	Republican	Oct 21, 1908 – Mar 3, 1923	Re-elected in 1916. Retired.	22	66th	22	Re-elected in 1914.	Oct 18, 1900 – Jul 12, 1923	Republican	William P. Dillingham (Montpelier)	17
14	Carroll S. Page (Hyde Park)	Republican	Oct 21, 1908 – Mar 3, 1923	Re-elected in 1916. Retired.	22	67th	23	Re-elected in 1920. Died.	Oct 18, 1900 – Jul 12, 1923	Republican	William P. Dillingham (Montpelier)	17
15	Frank L. Greene (St. Albans)	Republican	Mar 4, 1923 – Dec 17, 1930	Elected in 1922.	23	68th	23	Re-elected in 1920. Died.	Oct 18, 1900 – Jul 12, 1923	Republican	William P. Dillingham (Montpelier)	17
15	Frank L. Greene (St. Albans)	Republican	Mar 4, 1923 – Dec 17, 1930	Elected in 1922.	23	68th	23		Jul 12, 1923 – Nov 7, 1923	Vacant		
15	Frank L. Greene (St. Albans)	Republican	Mar 4, 1923 – Dec 17, 1930	Elected in 1922.	23	68th	23	Elected to finish Dillingham's term.	Nov 7, 1923 – Oct 6, 1933	Republican	Porter H. Dale (Island Pond)	18
15	Frank L. Greene (St. Albans)	Republican	Mar 4, 1923 – Dec 17, 1930	Elected in 1922.	23	69th	23	Elected to finish Dillingham's term.	Nov 7, 1923 – Oct 6, 1933	Republican	Porter H. Dale (Island Pond)	18
15	Frank L. Greene (St. Albans)	Republican	Mar 4, 1923 – Dec 17, 1930	Elected in 1922.	23	70th	24	Re-elected in 1926.	Nov 7, 1923 – Oct 6, 1933	Republican	Porter H. Dale (Island Pond)	18
15	Frank L. Greene (St. Albans)	Republican	Mar 4, 1923 – Dec 17, 1930	Re-elected in 1928. Died.	24	71st	24	Re-elected in 1926.	Nov 7, 1923 – Oct 6, 1933	Republican	Porter H. Dale (Island Pond)	18
Vacant			Dec 17, 1930 – Dec 23, 1930		24	71st	24	Re-elected in 1926.	Nov 7, 1923 – Oct 6, 1933	Republican	Porter H. Dale (Island Pond)	18
16	Frank C. Partridge (Proctor)	Republican	Dec 23, 1930 – Mar 31, 1931	Appointed to continue Greene's term. Lost nomination to finish Greene's term.	24	71st	24	Re-elected in 1926.	Nov 7, 1923 – Oct 6, 1933	Republican	Porter H. Dale (Island Pond)	18
16	Frank C. Partridge (Proctor)	Republican	Dec 23, 1930 – Mar 31, 1931	Appointed to continue Greene's term. Lost nomination to finish Greene's term.	24	72nd	24	Re-elected in 1926.	Nov 7, 1923 – Oct 6, 1933	Republican	Porter H. Dale (Island Pond)	18
17	Warren Austin (Burlington)	Republican	Apr 1, 1931 – Aug 2, 1946	Elected to finish Greene's term.	24	72nd	24	Re-elected in 1926.	Nov 7, 1923 – Oct 6, 1933	Republican	Porter H. Dale (Island Pond)	18
17	Warren Austin (Burlington)	Republican	Apr 1, 1931 – Aug 2, 1946	Elected to finish Greene's term.	24	73rd	25	Re-elected in 1932. Died.	Nov 7, 1923 – Oct 6, 1933	Republican	Porter H. Dale (Island Pond)	18
17	Warren Austin (Burlington)	Republican	Apr 1, 1931 – Aug 2, 1946	Elected to finish Greene's term.	24	73rd	25		Oct 6, 1933 – Nov 21, 1933	Vacant		
17	Warren Austin (Burlington)	Republican	Apr 1, 1931 – Aug 2, 1946	Elected to finish Greene's term.	24	73rd	25	Appointed to continue Dale's term. Elected in 1934 to finish Dale's term.	Nov 21, 1933 – Jun 20, 1940	Republican	Ernest W. Gibson (Brattleboro)	19
17	Warren Austin (Burlington)	Republican	Apr 1, 1931 – Aug 2, 1946	Re-elected in 1934.	25	74th	25	Appointed to continue Dale's term. Elected in 1934 to finish Dale's term.	Nov 21, 1933 – Jun 20, 1940	Republican	Ernest W. Gibson (Brattleboro)	19
17	Warren Austin (Burlington)	Republican	Apr 1, 1931 – Aug 2, 1946	Re-elected in 1934.	25	75th	25	Appointed to continue Dale's term. Elected in 1934 to finish Dale's term.	Nov 21, 1933 – Jun 20, 1940	Republican	Ernest W. Gibson (Brattleboro)	19
17	Warren Austin (Burlington)	Republican	Apr 1, 1931 – Aug 2, 1946	Re-elected in 1934.	25	76th	26	Re-elected in 1938. Died.	Nov 21, 1933 – Jun 20, 1940	Republican	Ernest W. Gibson (Brattleboro)	19
17	Warren Austin (Burlington)	Republican	Apr 1, 1931 – Aug 2, 1946	Re-elected in 1934.	25	76th	26		Jun 20, 1940 – Jun 24, 1940	Vacant		
17	Warren Austin (Burlington)	Republican	Apr 1, 1931 – Aug 2, 1946	Re-elected in 1934.	25	76th	26	Appointed to continue his father's term. Retired.	Jun 24, 1940 – Jan 3, 1941	Republican	Ernest Gibson Jr. (Brattleboro)	20
17	Warren Austin (Burlington)	Republican	Apr 1, 1931 – Aug 2, 1946	Re-elected in 1940. Resigned to become U.S. Ambassador to the United Nations	26	77th	26	Elected in 1940 to finish Gibson's term. Didn't take seat until Jan 10, 1941, in order to remain Governor of Vermont.	Jan 3, 1941 – Jan 3, 1975	Republican	George Aiken (Putney)	21
17	Warren Austin (Burlington)	Republican	Apr 1, 1931 – Aug 2, 1946	Re-elected in 1940. Resigned to become U.S. Ambassador to the United Nations	26	78th	26	Elected in 1940 to finish Gibson's term. Didn't take seat until Jan 10, 1941, in order to remain Governor of Vermont.	Jan 3, 1941 – Jan 3, 1975	Republican	George Aiken (Putney)	21
17	Warren Austin (Burlington)	Republican	Apr 1, 1931 – Aug 2, 1946	Re-elected in 1940. Resigned to become U.S. Ambassador to the United Nations	26	79th	27	Re-elected in 1944.	Jan 3, 1941 – Jan 3, 1975	Republican	George Aiken (Putney)	21
Vacant			Aug 2, 1946 – Nov 1, 1946		26	79th	27	Re-elected in 1944.	Jan 3, 1941 – Jan 3, 1975	Republican	George Aiken (Putney)	21
18	Ralph Flanders (Springfield)	Republican	Nov 1, 1946 – Jan 3, 1959	Appointed to finish Austin's term.	26	79th	27	Re-elected in 1944.	Jan 3, 1941 – Jan 3, 1975	Republican	George Aiken (Putney)	21
18	Ralph Flanders (Springfield)	Republican	Nov 1, 1946 – Jan 3, 1959	Elected in 1946.	27	80th	27	Re-elected in 1944.	Jan 3, 1941 – Jan 3, 1975	Republican	George Aiken (Putney)	21
18	Ralph Flanders (Springfield)	Republican	Nov 1, 1946 – Jan 3, 1959	Elected in 1946.	27	81st	27	Re-elected in 1944.	Jan 3, 1941 – Jan 3, 1975	Republican	George Aiken (Putney)	21
18	Ralph Flanders (Springfield)	Republican	Nov 1, 1946 – Jan 3, 1959	Elected in 1946.	27	82nd	28	Re-elected in 1950.	Jan 3, 1941 – Jan 3, 1975	Republican	George Aiken (Putney)	21
18	Ralph Flanders (Springfield)	Republican	Nov 1, 1946 – Jan 3, 1959	Re-elected in 1952. Retired.	28	83rd	28	Re-elected in 1950.	Jan 3, 1941 – Jan 3, 1975	Republican	George Aiken (Putney)	21
18	Ralph Flanders (Springfield)	Republican	Nov 1, 1946 – Jan 3, 1959	Re-elected in 1952. Retired.	28	84th	28	Re-elected in 1950.	Jan 3, 1941 – Jan 3, 1975	Republican	George Aiken (Putney)	21
18	Ralph Flanders (Springfield)	Republican	Nov 1, 1946 – Jan 3, 1959	Re-elected in 1952. Retired.	28	85th	29	Re-elected in 1956.	Jan 3, 1941 – Jan 3, 1975	Republican	George Aiken (Putney)	21
19	Winston L. Prouty (Newport)	Republican	Jan 3, 1959 – Sep 10, 1971	Elected in 1958.	29	86th	29	Re-elected in 1956.	Jan 3, 1941 – Jan 3, 1975	Republican	George Aiken (Putney)	21
19	Winston L. Prouty (Newport)	Republican	Jan 3, 1959 – Sep 10, 1971	Elected in 1958.	29	87th	29	Re-elected in 1956.	Jan 3, 1941 – Jan 3, 1975	Republican	George Aiken (Putney)	21
19	Winston L. Prouty (Newport)	Republican	Jan 3, 1959 – Sep 10, 1971	Elected in 1958.	29	88th	30	Re-elected in 1962.	Jan 3, 1941 – Jan 3, 1975	Republican	George Aiken (Putney)	21
19	Winston L. Prouty (Newport)	Republican	Jan 3, 1959 – Sep 10, 1971	Re-elected in 1964.	30	89th	30	Re-elected in 1962.	Jan 3, 1941 – Jan 3, 1975	Republican	George Aiken (Putney)	21
19	Winston L. Prouty (Newport)	Republican	Jan 3, 1959 – Sep 10, 1971	Re-elected in 1964.	30	90th	30	Re-elected in 1962.	Jan 3, 1941 – Jan 3, 1975	Republican	George Aiken (Putney)	21
19	Winston L. Prouty (Newport)	Republican	Jan 3, 1959 – Sep 10, 1971	Re-elected in 1964.	30	91st	31	Re-elected in 1968. Retired.	Jan 3, 1941 – Jan 3, 1975	Republican	George Aiken (Putney)	21
19	Winston L. Prouty (Newport)	Republican	Jan 3, 1959 – Sep 10, 1971	Re-elected in 1970. Died.	31	92nd	31	Re-elected in 1968. Retired.	Jan 3, 1941 – Jan 3, 1975	Republican	George Aiken (Putney)	21
Vacant			Sep 10, 1971 – Sep 16, 1971		31	92nd	31	Re-elected in 1968. Retired.	Jan 3, 1941 – Jan 3, 1975	Republican	George Aiken (Putney)	21
20	Robert Stafford (Rutland)	Republican	Sep 16, 1971 – Jan 3, 1989	Appointed to continue Prouty's term. Elected in 1972 to finish Prouty's term.	31	92nd	31	Re-elected in 1968. Retired.	Jan 3, 1941 – Jan 3, 1975	Republican	George Aiken (Putney)	21
20	Robert Stafford (Rutland)	Republican	Sep 16, 1971 – Jan 3, 1989	Appointed to continue Prouty's term. Elected in 1972 to finish Prouty's term.	31	93rd	31	Re-elected in 1968. Retired.	Jan 3, 1941 – Jan 3, 1975	Republican	George Aiken (Putney)	21
20	Robert Stafford (Rutland)	Republican	Sep 16, 1971 – Jan 3, 1989	Appointed to continue Prouty's term. Elected in 1972 to finish Prouty's term.	31	94th	32	Elected in 1974.	Jan 3, 1975 – Jan 3, 2023	Democratic	Patrick Leahy (Middlesex)	22
20	Robert Stafford (Rutland)	Republican	Sep 16, 1971 – Jan 3, 1989	Re-elected in 1976.	32	95th	32	Elected in 1974.	Jan 3, 1975 – Jan 3, 2023	Democratic	Patrick Leahy (Middlesex)	22
20	Robert Stafford (Rutland)	Republican	Sep 16, 1971 – Jan 3, 1989	Re-elected in 1976.	32	96th	32	Elected in 1974.	Jan 3, 1975 – Jan 3, 2023	Democratic	Patrick Leahy (Middlesex)	22
20	Robert Stafford (Rutland)	Republican	Sep 16, 1971 – Jan 3, 1989	Re-elected in 1976.	32	97th	33	Re-elected in 1980.	Jan 3, 1975 – Jan 3, 2023	Democratic	Patrick Leahy (Middlesex)	22
20	Robert Stafford (Rutland)	Republican	Sep 16, 1971 – Jan 3, 1989	Re-elected in 1982. Retired.	33	98th	33	Re-elected in 1980.	Jan 3, 1975 – Jan 3, 2023	Democratic	Patrick Leahy (Middlesex)	22
20	Robert Stafford (Rutland)	Republican	Sep 16, 1971 – Jan 3, 1989	Re-elected in 1982. Retired.	33	99th	33	Re-elected in 1980.	Jan 3, 1975 – Jan 3, 2023	Democratic	Patrick Leahy (Middlesex)	22
20	Robert Stafford (Rutland)	Republican	Sep 16, 1971 – Jan 3, 1989	Re-elected in 1982. Retired.	33	100th	34	Re-elected in 1986.	Jan 3, 1975 – Jan 3, 2023	Democratic	Patrick Leahy (Middlesex)	22
21	Jim Jeffords (Shrewsbury)	Republican	Jan 3, 1989 – Jan 3, 2007	Elected in 1988.	34	101st	34	Re-elected in 1986.	Jan 3, 1975 – Jan 3, 2023	Democratic	Patrick Leahy (Middlesex)	22
21	Jim Jeffords (Shrewsbury)	Republican	Jan 3, 1989 – Jan 3, 2007	Elected in 1988.	34	102nd	34	Re-elected in 1986.	Jan 3, 1975 – Jan 3, 2023	Democratic	Patrick Leahy (Middlesex)	22
21	Jim Jeffords (Shrewsbury)	Republican	Jan 3, 1989 – Jan 3, 2007	Elected in 1988.	34	103rd	35	Re-elected in 1992.	Jan 3, 1975 – Jan 3, 2023	Democratic	Patrick Leahy (Middlesex)	22
21	Jim Jeffords (Shrewsbury)	Republican	Jan 3, 1989 – Jan 3, 2007	Re-elected in 1994.	35	104th	35	Re-elected in 1992.	Jan 3, 1975 – Jan 3, 2023	Democratic	Patrick Leahy (Middlesex)	22
21	Jim Jeffords (Shrewsbury)	Republican	Jan 3, 1989 – Jan 3, 2007	Re-elected in 1994.	35	105th	35	Re-elected in 1992.	Jan 3, 1975 – Jan 3, 2023	Democratic	Patrick Leahy (Middlesex)	22
21	Jim Jeffords (Shrewsbury)	Republican	Jan 3, 1989 – Jan 3, 2007	Re-elected in 1994.	35	106th	36	Re-elected in 1998.	Jan 3, 1975 – Jan 3, 2023	Democratic	Patrick Leahy (Middlesex)	22
21	Jim Jeffords (Shrewsbury)	Republican	Jan 3, 1989 – Jan 3, 2007	Re-elected in 2000. Left the Republican Party on May 24, 2001. Retired.	36	107th	36	Re-elected in 1998.	Jan 3, 1975 – Jan 3, 2023	Democratic	Patrick Leahy (Middlesex)	22
21	Jim Jeffords (Shrewsbury)	Independent	Jan 3, 1989 – Jan 3, 2007	Re-elected in 2000. Left the Republican Party on May 24, 2001. Retired.	36	107th	36	Re-elected in 1998.	Jan 3, 1975 – Jan 3, 2023	Democratic	Patrick Leahy (Middlesex)	22
21	Jim Jeffords (Shrewsbury)	Independent	Jan 3, 1989 – Jan 3, 2007	Re-elected in 2000. Left the Republican Party on May 24, 2001. Retired.	36	108th	36	Re-elected in 1998.	Jan 3, 1975 – Jan 3, 2023	Democratic	Patrick Leahy (Middlesex)	22
21	Jim Jeffords (Shrewsbury)	Independent	Jan 3, 1989 – Jan 3, 2007	Re-elected in 2000. Left the Republican Party on May 24, 2001. Retired.	36	109th	37	Re-elected in 2004.	Jan 3, 1975 – Jan 3, 2023	Democratic	Patrick Leahy (Middlesex)	22
22	Bernie Sanders (Burlington)	Independent (Note: There has never been a Democratic Senator for Vermont's Class 1 Senate seat. Although Bernie Sanders ran for the Democratic nomination in 2016 and 2020, he has not joined the Democratic Party on his own Senate webpages.)	Jan 3, 2007 – present	Elected in 2006.	37	110th	37	Re-elected in 2004.	Jan 3, 1975 – Jan 3, 2023	Democratic	Patrick Leahy (Middlesex)	22
22	Bernie Sanders (Burlington)	Independent	Jan 3, 2007 – present	Elected in 2006.	37	111th	37	Re-elected in 2004.	Jan 3, 1975 – Jan 3, 2023	Democratic	Patrick Leahy (Middlesex)	22
22	Bernie Sanders (Burlington)	Independent	Jan 3, 2007 – present	Elected in 2006.	37	112th	38	Re-elected in 2010.	Jan 3, 1975 – Jan 3, 2023	Democratic	Patrick Leahy (Middlesex)	22
22	Bernie Sanders (Burlington)	Independent	Jan 3, 2007 – present	Re-elected in 2012.	38	113th	38	Re-elected in 2010.	Jan 3, 1975 – Jan 3, 2023	Democratic	Patrick Leahy (Middlesex)	22
22	Bernie Sanders (Burlington)	Independent	Jan 3, 2007 – present	Re-elected in 2012.	38	114th	38	Re-elected in 2010.	Jan 3, 1975 – Jan 3, 2023	Democratic	Patrick Leahy (Middlesex)	22
22	Bernie Sanders (Burlington)	Independent	Jan 3, 2007 – present	Re-elected in 2012.	38	115th	39	Re-elected in 2016. Retired.	Jan 3, 1975 – Jan 3, 2023	Democratic	Patrick Leahy (Middlesex)	22
22	Bernie Sanders (Burlington)	Independent	Jan 3, 2007 – present	Re-elected in 2018.	39	116th	39	Re-elected in 2016. Retired.	Jan 3, 1975 – Jan 3, 2023	Democratic	Patrick Leahy (Middlesex)	22
22	Bernie Sanders (Burlington)	Independent	Jan 3, 2007 – present	Re-elected in 2018.	39	117th	39	Re-elected in 2016. Retired.	Jan 3, 1975 – Jan 3, 2023	Democratic	Patrick Leahy (Middlesex)	22
22	Bernie Sanders (Burlington)	Independent	Jan 3, 2007 – present	Re-elected in 2018.	39	118th	40	Elected in 2022.	Jan 3, 2023 – present	Democratic	Peter Welch (Norwich)	23
22	Bernie Sanders (Burlington)	Independent	Jan 3, 2007 – present	Re-elected in 2024.	40	119th	40	Elected in 2022.	Jan 3, 2023 – present	Democratic	Peter Welch (Norwich)	23
22	Bernie Sanders (Burlington)	Independent	Jan 3, 2007 – present	Re-elected in 2024.	40	120th	40	Elected in 2022.	Jan 3, 2023 – present	Democratic	Peter Welch (Norwich)	23
22	Bernie Sanders (Burlington)	Independent	Jan 3, 2007 – present	Re-elected in 2024.	40	121st	41	To be determined in the 2028 election.				
To be determined in the 2030 election.					41	122nd	41	To be determined in the 2028 election.				

== See also ==
- Elections in Vermont
- List of United States representatives from Vermont
- Vermont's congressional delegations

== Sources ==
- Byrd, Robert C. (October 1, 1993). Wolff, Wendy (ed.). The Senate, 1789-1989: Historical Statistics, 1789-1992. United States Senate Historical Office (volume 4 Bicentennial ed.). Washington, D.C.: U.S. Government Printing Office. ISBN 9780160632563.
- "U.S. Senators, Terms of Service" (PDF). Vermont Archives and Records Administration. Montpelier, VT: Vermont Secretary of State. 2017.
