= 1944 United States Senate election in Vermont =

- November 7, 1944
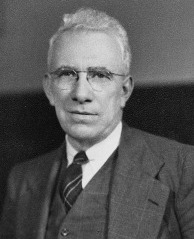

Nominee	George Aiken	Harry Witters
Party	Republican	Democratic
Popular vote	81,094	42,136
Percentage	65.81%	34.19%
- Aiken: 50–60% 60–70% 70–80% 80–90% >90% Witters: 50–60% 60–70% 80–90%
U.S. senator before election
George Aiken
Republican
Elected U.S. Senator
George Aiken
Republican

The 1944 United States Senate election in Vermont took place on November 7, 1944. Incumbent Republican George Aiken ran successfully for re-election to another term in the United States Senate, defeating Democratic nominee Harry W. Witters.

== Republican primary ==
=== Results ===
Republican primary results
Party	Candidate	Votes	%	±%
Republican	George Aiken (inc.)	33,660	99.7%	
Republican	Other	91	0.3%	
Total votes		33,751	100.0%	

== Democratic primary ==
=== Results ===
Democratic primary results
Party	Candidate	Votes	%	±%
Democratic	Harry W. Witters	2,227	99.6%	
Democratic	Other	9	0.4%	
Total votes		2,236	100.0%	

== General election ==
=== Candidates ===
- George Aiken, incumbent U.S. Senator
- Harry W. Witters, lawyer and former WPA Administrator

=== Endorsements ===
George Aiken

Labor unions

- CIO-PAC

=== Results ===
United States Senate election in Vermont, 1944
Party	Candidate	Votes	%	±%
Republican	George Aiken (inc.)	81,094	65.81%	+4.18%
Democratic	Harry W. Witters	42,136	34.19%	−4.18%
Total votes		123,230	100.00%	
