= 1926 United States Senate election in Vermont =

United States Senate election in Vermont, 1926
- November 2, 1926
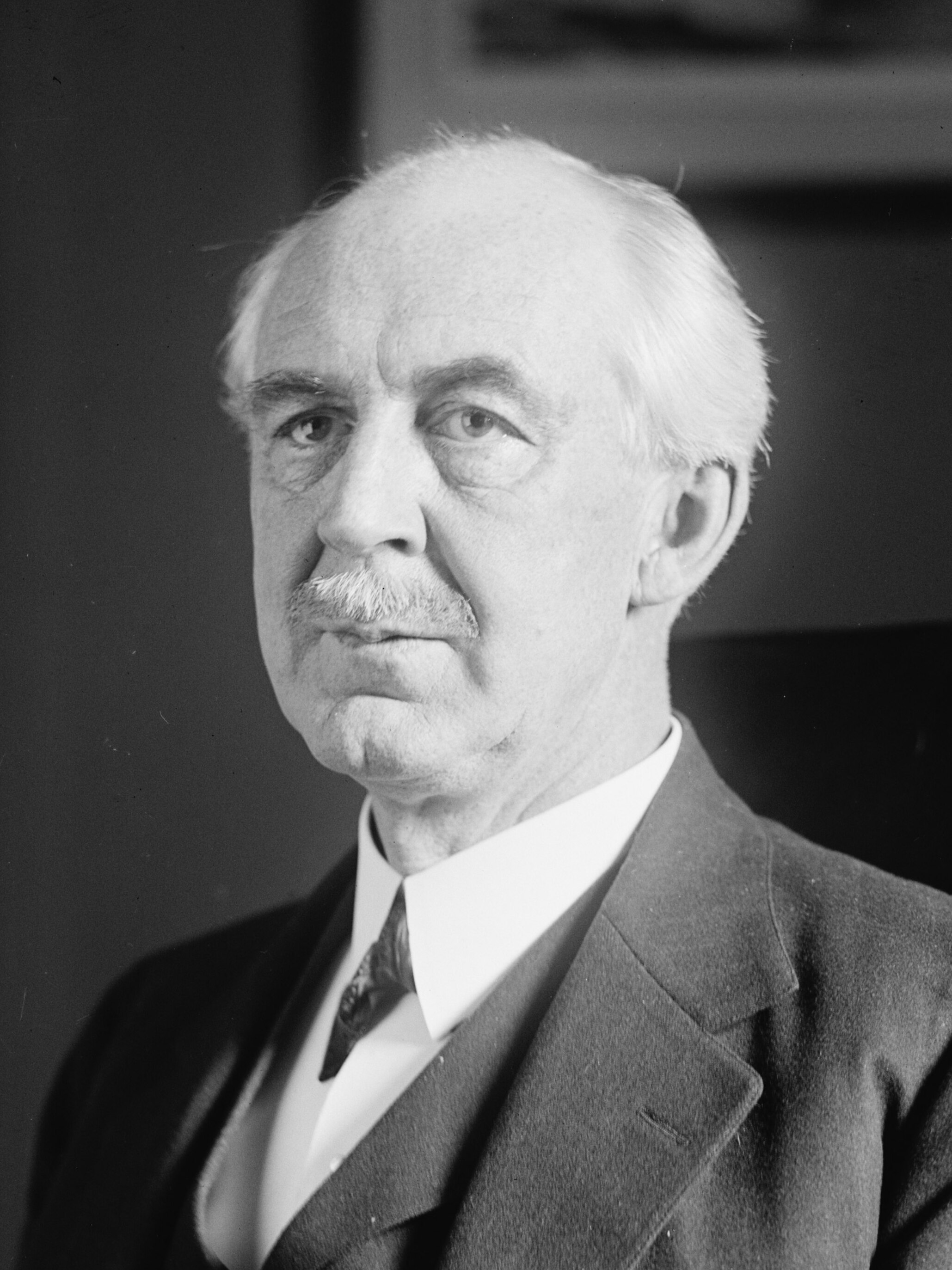

Nominee	Porter H. Dale	James Kennedy
Party	Republican	Democratic
Popular vote	52,286	18,890
Percentage	73.46%	26.54%
U.S. senator before election
Porter H. Dale
Republican
Elected U.S. Senator
Porter H. Dale
Republican

The 1926 United States Senate election in Vermont took place on November 2, 1926. Republican Porter H. Dale successfully ran for re-election to a full term in the United States Senate, defeating Democratic candidate James E. Kennedy.

== Republican primary ==
=== Results ===
Republican primary results
Party	Candidate	Votes	%	±%
Republican	Porter H. Dale (inc.)	44,300	99.4%	
Republican	Other	288	0.6%	
Total votes		44,588	100.0%	

== Democratic primary ==
=== Results ===
Democratic primary results
Party	Candidate	Votes	%	±%
Democratic	James E. Kennedy	2,101	99.4%	
Democratic	Other	12	0.6%	
Total votes		2,113	100.0%	

== General election ==
=== Results ===
United States Senate election in Vermont, 1926
Party	Candidate	Votes	%	±%
Republican	Porter H. Dale	50,364	70.76%	+5.11%
Prohibition	Porter H. Dale	1,922	2.70%	N/A
Total	Porter H. Dale (inc.)	52,286	73.46%	N/A
Democratic	James E. Kennedy	18,878	26.52%	−7.14%
Republican	James E. Kennedy	12	0.02%	N/A
Total	James E. Kennedy	18,890	26.54%	N/A
Total votes		71,176	100.00%	
