= 1950 United States Senate election in Vermont =

- November 7, 1950
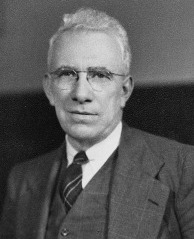

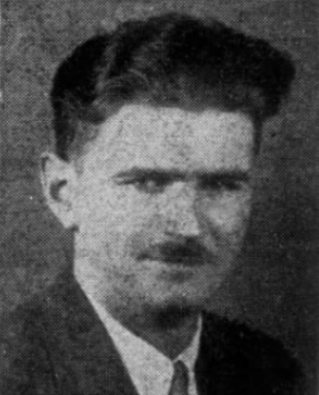
Nominee	George Aiken	James Bigelow
Party	Republican	Democratic
Popular vote	69,543	19,608
Percentage	78.01%	21.99%
- Aiken: 50–60% 60–70% 70–80% 80–90% >90% Bigelow: 50–60% 60–70% No vote No data
U.S. senator before election
George Aiken
Republican
Elected U.S. Senator
George Aiken
Republican

The 1950 United States Senate election in Vermont took place on November 7, 1950. Incumbent Republican George Aiken ran successfully for re-election to another term in the United States Senate, defeating Democratic challenger James E. Bigelow.

== Republican primary ==
=== Results ===
Republican primary results
Party	Candidate	Votes	%	±%
Republican	George Aiken (inc.)	69,483	99.9%	
Republican	Other	51	0.1%	
Total votes		69,534	100.0%	

== Democratic primary ==
=== Results ===
Democratic primary results
Party	Candidate	Votes	%	±%
Democratic	James E. Bigelow	3,290	98.9%	
Democratic	Other	35	1.1%	
Total votes		3,325	100.0%	

== General election ==
=== Candidates ===
- George Aiken (Republican), incumbent U.S. Senator
- James E. Bigelow (Democratic), former State Attorney for Windham County

=== Results ===
United States Senate election in Vermont, 1950
Party	Candidate	Votes	%	±%
Republican	George Aiken (inc.)	69,543	78.01%	+12.20%
Democratic	James E. Bigelow	19,608	21.99%	−12.20%
Total votes		89,151	100.00%	
