= 1934 United States Senate special election in Vermont =

- January 16, 1934
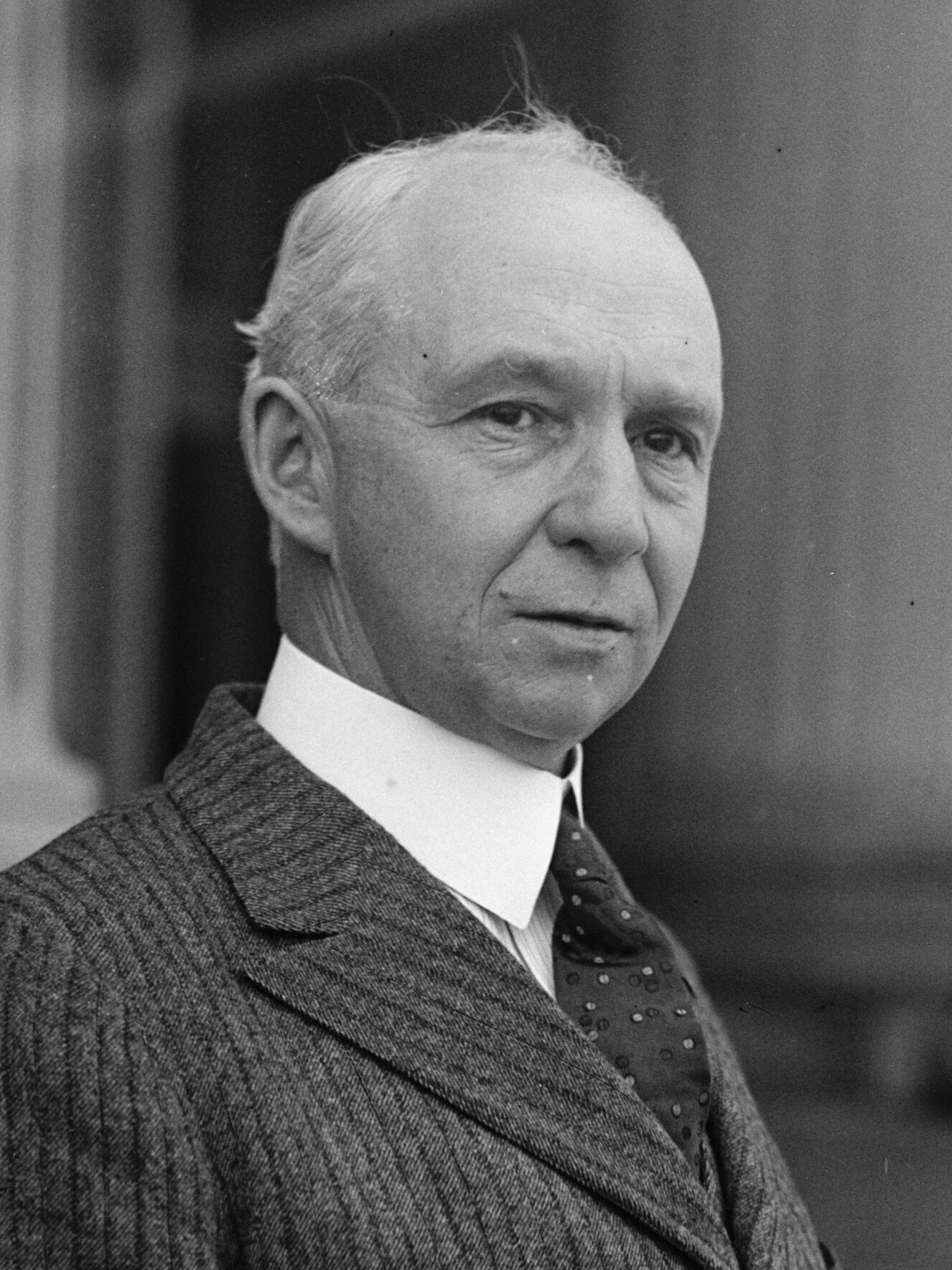

| Nominee | Ernest Willard Gibson | Harry Witters |
| Party | Republican | Democratic |
| Popular vote | 28,436 | 20,382 |
| Percentage | 58.23% | 41.74% |
- Gibson: 50–60% 60–70% 70–80% 80–90% >90% Witters: 50–60% 60–70% 70–80% 80–90% >90% Tie: 50%
U.S. senator before election
Porter H. Dale
Republican
Elected U.S. Senator
Ernest W. Gibson, Sr.
Republican

The 1934 United States Senate special election in Vermont took place on January 16, 1934. Republican Ernest W. Gibson Sr. was elected to the United States Senate to serve the remainder of the deceased Porter H. Dale's term, defeating Democratic candidate Harry W. Witters.

== General election ==
=== Candidates ===
- Ernest Willard Gibson, former U.S. Representative from VT-AL
- Harry W. Witters, lawyer

=== Results ===
United States Senate special election in Vermont, 1934
| Party | Candidate | Votes | % | ±% |
|---|---|---|---|---|
| Republican | Ernest W. Gibson, Sr. | 28,436 | 58.23% | +3.09% |
| Democratic | Harry W. Witters | 20,382 | 41.74% | −3.12% |
| N/A | Other | 12 | 0.02% | N/A |
| Total votes | | 48,830 | 100.00% | |
