= 1956 United States Senate election in Vermont =

- November 6, 1956
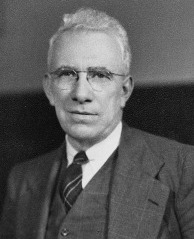

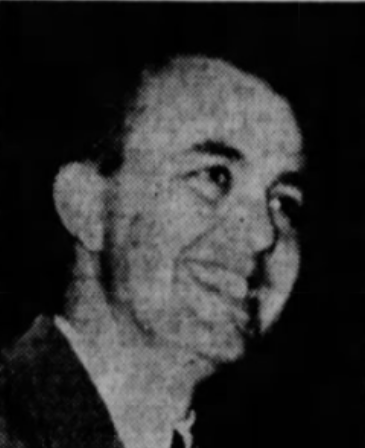
Nominee	George Aiken	Bernard O'Shea
Party	Republican	Democratic
Popular vote	103,101	52,184
Percentage	66.39%	33.61%
- Aiken: 50–60% 60–70% 70–80% 80–90% >90% O'Shea: 50–60% 60–70% 70–80%
U.S. senator before election
George Aiken
Republican
Elected U.S. Senator
George Aiken
Republican

The 1956 United States Senate election in Vermont took place on November 6, 1956. Incumbent Republican George Aiken ran successfully for re-election to another term in the United States Senate, defeating Democratic nominee Bernard O'Shea, editor of the Swanton Courier.

== Republican primary ==
=== Results ===
Republican primary results
Party	Candidate	Votes	%	±%
Republican	George Aiken (inc.)	49,454	99.9%	
Republican	Other	27	0.1%	
Total votes		49,481	100.0%	

== Democratic primary ==
=== Results ===
Democratic primary results
Party	Candidate	Votes	%	±%
Democratic	Bernard G. O'Shea	7,997	99.8%	
Democratic	Other	19	0.2%	
Total votes		8,016	100.0%	

== General election ==
=== Candidates ===
- George Aiken (R), incumbent U.S. Senator
- Bernard O'Shea (D), publisher of the Swanton Courier

=== Results ===
United States Senate election in Vermont, 1956
Party	Candidate	Votes	%	±%
Republican	George Aiken (inc.)	103,101	66.39%	−11.62%
Democratic	Bernard G. O'Shea	52,184	33.61%	+11.62%
Total votes		155,289	100.00%	

== See also ==
- 1956 United States Senate elections
