= 1940 United States Senate special election in Vermont =

- November 5, 1940
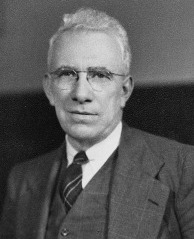

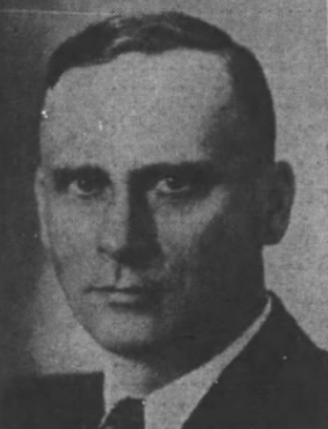
Nominee	George Aiken	Herbert B. Comings
Party	Republican	Democratic
Popular vote	87,150	54,263
Percentage	61.63%	38.37%
- Aiken: 50–60% 60–70% 70–80% 80–90% >90% Comings: 50–60% 60–70% 70–80% 80–90%
U.S. senator before election
Ernest W. Gibson, Jr.
Republican
Elected U.S. Senator
George Aiken
Republican

The 1940 United States Senate special election in Vermont took place on November 5, 1940. Republican George Aiken was elected to the United States Senate to serve the remainder of the deceased Ernest W. Gibson, Sr.'s term, defeating Democratic candidate Herbert B. Comings. Aiken replaced Gibson's son, Ernest W. Gibson, Jr., who was appointed to fill the seat until a special election could be held.

== Republican primary ==
=== Results ===
Republican primary results
Party	Candidate	Votes	%	±%
Republican	George Aiken	36,237	55.4%	
Republican	Ralph Flanders	29,216	44.6%	
Republican	Other	7	0.0%	
Total votes		65,453	100.0%	

== Democratic primary ==
=== Results ===
Democratic primary results
Party	Candidate	Votes	%	±%
Democratic	Herbert B. Comings	5,621	99.2%	
Democratic	Other	48	0.8%	
Total votes		5,669	100.0%	

== General election ==
=== Candidates ===
- George Aiken, Governor of Vermont
- Herbert B. Comings, state senator

=== Results ===
United States Senate special election in Vermont, 1940
Party	Candidate	Votes	%	±%
Republican	George Aiken	87,150	61.63%	−4.04%
Democratic	Herbert B. Comings	54,263	38.37%	+4.04%
Total votes		141,413	100.00%	

== See also ==
- United States Senate elections, 1940 and 1941
