= Ernest W. Gibson =

American politician (1871–1940)

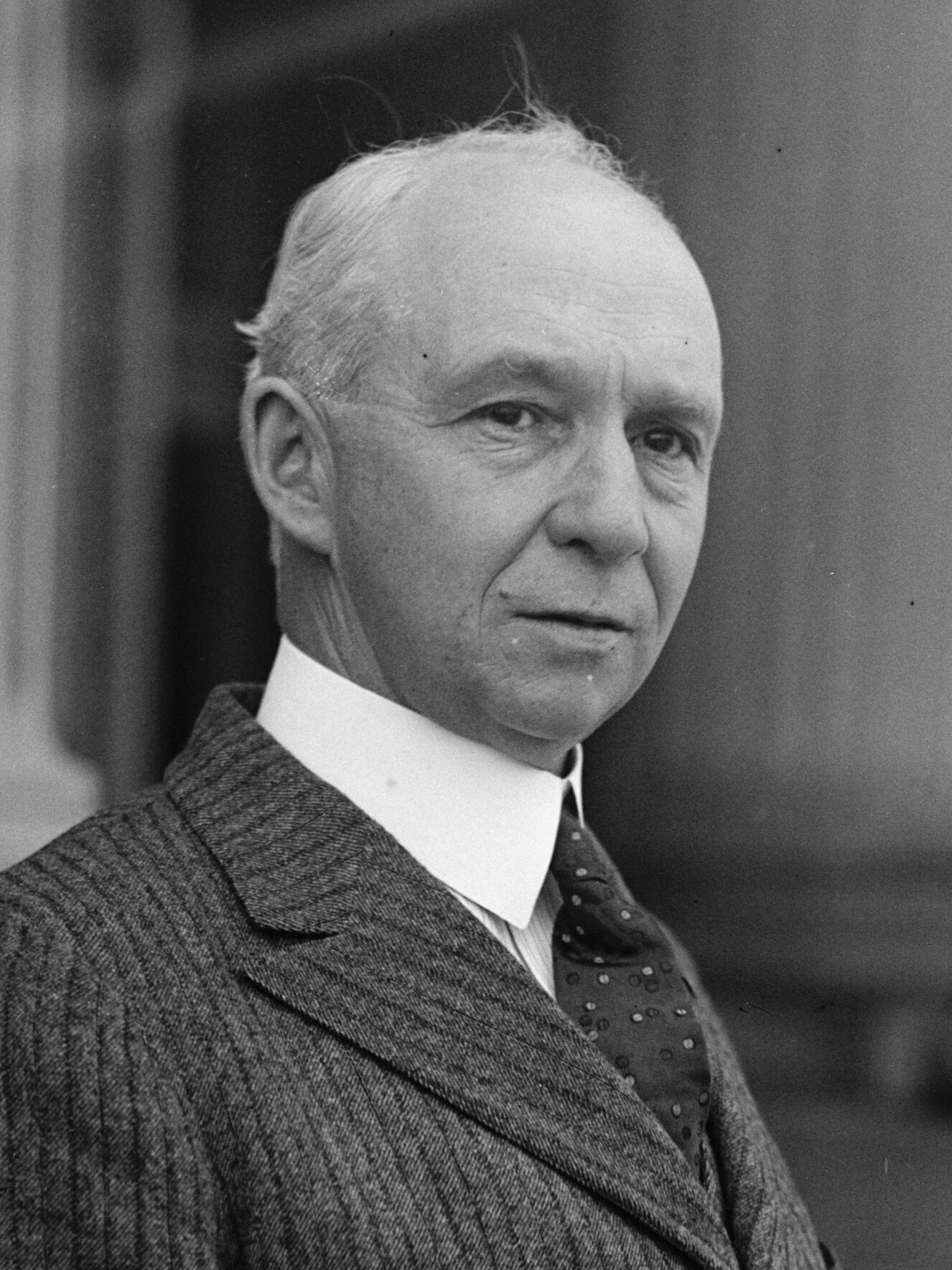

United States Senator from Vermont
- In office November 21, 1933 – June 20, 1940
- Preceded by: Porter H. Dale
- Succeeded by: Ernest W. Gibson Jr.

Member of the U.S. House of Representatives from Vermont
- In office November 6, 1923 – October 19, 1933
- Preceded by: Porter H. Dale
- Succeeded by: Charles A. Plumley
- Constituency: 2nd district (1923–1933); At-large district (1933)

President pro tempore of the Vermont Senate
- In office 1908–1910
- Preceded by: William J. Van Patten
- Succeeded by: Max L. Powell

Member of the Vermont Senate from Windham County
- In office 1908–1910 Serving with George H. Gorham
- Preceded by: Charles S. Chase, Brigham T. Phelps
- Succeeded by: Edwin P. Adams, Edgar M. Butler

Judge of the Brattleboro, Vermont Municipal Court
- In office December 20, 1906 – December 1, 1910
- Preceded by: None (position created)
- Succeeded by: Kittredge Haskins

Member of the Vermont House of Representatives from Brattleboro
- In office 1906–1908
- Preceded by: Clarke C. Fitts
- Succeeded by: Herbert G. Barber

Personal details
- Born: Ernest Willard Gibson; December 29, 1871 Londonderry, Vermont, U.S.
- Died: June 20, 1940 (aged 68) Washington, D.C., U.S.
- Party: Republican
- Spouse: Grace Fullerton Hadley
- Children: 4, including Ernest Jr.
- Education: Norwich University (B.S., M.A.); University of Michigan Law School
- Profession: Lawyer

Military service
- Allegiance: United States
- Branch/service: Vermont National Guard; United States Army
- Years of service: 1899–1908; 1915–1923
- Rank: Colonel
- Battles/wars: Pancho Villa Expedition; World War I

Ernest Willard Gibson (December 29, 1871 – June 20, 1940) was an American politician and lawyer from Vermont. A Republican, he served in both the United States House of Representatives (1923–1933) and United States Senate (1933–1940).

A native of Londonderry, Vermont, Gibson graduated from Black River Academy (1891) and Norwich University (BS, 1894, MA, 1896). From 1894 to 1898, Gibson was principal of the high school in Chester, Vermont. While working as a principal, Gibson studied law with Eleazer L. Waterman and James Loren Martin attended the University of Michigan Law School. He was admitted to the bar in 1899 and began to practice in Brattleboro.

Gibson gained his initial political experience as a Chester Village Trustee (1895 to 1898). While practicing law, he served as Windham County Register of Probate and Deputy Clerk of Vermont's United States District Court. He subsequently won terms in the Vermont House of Representatives (1906) and Vermont Senate (1908). During his State Senate term, Gibson was the body's President pro tempore. Gibson served as judge of Brattleboro's Municipal Court from 1906 to 1910.

From 1899 to 1908 Gibson served in the Vermont National Guard. Enlisting as a private, he received his commission as an officer in 1901. From 1906 to 1908 he served on the staff of Governor Fletcher D. Proctor with the rank of colonel. He served again from 1915 to 1923 and took part in the Pancho Villa Expedition after Joining the 1st Vermont Infantry Regiment as a captain. During World War I, Gibson was commander of Company I, 1st Vermont Infantry, which was later federalized as the 57th Pioneer Infantry Regiment. Gibson remained in the National Guard after the war, and retired as a colonel after he won a seat in the U.S. House.

In 1912, Gibson became a leader of the Progressive movement in Vermont, but remained loyal to the Republican Party, which enabled him to serve as a bridge between the two groups. He served as Windham County State's Attorney from 1919 until 1921 and was Secretary of Civil and Military Affairs (chief assistant) at the start of Governor James Hartness's term in 1921. In November 1923, Gibson was elected to the United States House of Representatives from Vermont's 2nd district. He continued to win reelection until 1932 when the 2nd District was eliminated and Vermont became one at-large district, Gibson was elected to represent it. After the 1933 death of Senator Porter H. Dale, Gibson was appointed to fill the vacancy. He was elected in 1934 to complete Dale's term, and in 1938 won election to a full six-year term. Gibson served in the Senate until his death. Gibson was buried at Morningside Cemetery in Brattleboro.

== Early life ==
Gibson was born in Londonderry, Vermont, on December 29, 1871, the son of Saville (Stowell) and William L. Gibson. He attended local schools, and was a graduate of Black River Academy, where his classmates included Calvin Coolidge. He graduated from Norwich University with a Bachelor of Science degree in 1894, and was a member of the Theta Chi fraternity. He received his Master of Arts degree from Norwich in 1896. He studied law with Eleazer L. Waterman and James Loren Martin, attended the University of Michigan Law School, and was admitted to the bar in 1899.

== Early career ==
Gibson was a high school principal in Chester from 1894 until 1898. He served as a Chester Village Trustee from 1895 to 1898.

He was a trustee of Norwich University from 1899 to 1909 and again from 1919 to 1935 and served as vice president of the board of trustees. Gibson received an honorary LL.D. from Norwich in 1926.

A Republican, after becoming an attorney he practiced in Brattleboro, where he also served as the Windham County Register of Probate and Deputy Clerk of Vermont's United States District Court. From 1904 to 1911 he was a lecturer on constitutional law at Norwich University.

In 1906 he was elected to the Vermont House of Representatives. In 1908 he was elected to the Vermont State Senate, and served as President pro tempore.

From 1906 to 1910 Gibson served as Brattleboro's Municipal Court Judge. In 1910 he ran unsuccessfully for the Republican nomination for lieutenant governor.

Gibson became a leader of the Progressive movement in Vermont, which ultimately led to creation of a recognized faction within the Vermont Republican Party, the Aiken-Gibson Wing. The Aiken-Gibson Wing was more liberal than the party establishment, which had been led for years by conservative business interests including the Smith family of St. Albans, the Fairbanks family of St. Johnsbury, and the Proctor family of Proctor.

Despite his Progressive views, Gibson remained loyal to the Republicans and worked to keep Vermonters with similar views in the party. To that end, in 1912 he was a delegate to the Republican National Convention.

Gibson served as Windham County State's Attorney from 1919 until 1921, and was Secretary of Civil and Military Affairs (chief assistant) to Governor James Hartness in 1921.

== Military service ==
From 1899 to 1908 Gibson served in the Vermont National Guard. Enlisting as a private, he was commissioned in 1901. From 1906 to 1908 he served on the staff of Governor Fletcher D. Proctor as a colonel.

He served again from 1915 to 1923. Joining the 1st Vermont Infantry Regiment as a captain, he served in the Pancho Villa Expedition in 1915 and 1916.

Gibson also served in World War I. As captain and commander of Company I, 1st Vermont Infantry (later federalized as the 57th Pioneer Infantry Regiment), Gibson served at Camp Bartlett, Camp Greene, and Camp Wadsworth, South Carolina before departing for France in September 1918. The 57th Pioneer Infantry provided replacement troops for the 83rd Division, with Gibson and a handful of soldiers left to reorganize the regiment and prepare it for a scheduled for deployment to the front lines. The Armistice occurred before the unit moved, and Gibson returned to the United States. At the end of the war he was stationed at Camp Devens, where he received his discharge in March 1919. Gibson remained in the National Guard, and retired as a colonel upon winning election to Congress.

== United States Representative ==
In November 1923, Gibson was elected to the United States House of Representatives (Sixty-eighth United States Congress), filling the vacancy caused when Porter H. Dale resigned Vermont's 2nd district seat to become a United States Senator. He was reelected to the Sixty-ninth, and the four succeeding Congresses, serving from November 6, 1923, until his resignation on October 19, 1933.

Vermont lost a House district as a result of the 1930 census, and in 1932 Gibson was elected as Vermont's at-large Congressman, defeating Loren R. Pierce in the primary, and going on to win the general election. Governor John E. Weeks had run for the 1st district seat in 1930 and indicated that if elected it would be the capstone of his career and he would not run in 1932, thus avoiding the possibility that two incumbents would run against each other for the at-large seat.

During his House tenure, Gibson was chairman of the Committee on Expenditures in the Department of the Treasury (Sixty-ninth Congress) and the Committee on Territories (Seventy-first Congress).

== United States Senate ==
In November 1933, Gibson was appointed to the United States Senate, filling the vacancy created by the death of Porter H. Dale. He was elected in 1934 to complete Dale's term, and elected to a full term in 1938. Gibson served in the Senate from November 21, 1933, until his death on June 20, 1940. He died in Washington, D.C., and was interred at Morningside Cemetery in Brattleboro.

== Family ==
Gibson married Grace Fullerton Hadley on November 25, 1896. They had four children, Frank Hadley Gibson (1899–1922), Ernest William Gibson Jr. (1901–1969), Doris Gibson (1903–1947) and Preston Fullerton Gibson (1908–1955). Preston F. Gibson was a lawyer who was active in Republican politics and served as judge of Brattleboro's municipal court.

Ernest W. Gibson Jr. succeeded his father temporarily in the Senate and later served as Governor of Vermont and Judge of the United States District Court for the District of Vermont.

The younger Ernest Gibson's children included Ernest W. Gibson III, an associate justice of the Vermont Supreme Court.

== See also ==
- List of members of the United States Congress who died in office (1900–1949)

Party political offices
Preceded by Porter H. Dale	Republican nominee for U.S. Senator from Vermont (Class 3); 1934, 1938	Succeeded by George Aiken
U.S. House of Representatives
Preceded by Porter H. Dale	Member of the U.S. House of Representatives from Vermont's 2nd congressional district 1923 – 1933	District eliminated
Preceded by District created	Member of the U.S. House of Representatives from Vermont's at-large congressional district 1933	Succeeded by Charles A. Plumley
U.S. Senate
Preceded by Porter H. Dale	U.S. senator (Class 3) from Vermont; 1933 – 1940; Served alongside: Warren Austin	Succeeded by Ernest W. Gibson Jr.
