= 1968 United States Senate election in Vermont =

- November 5, 1968
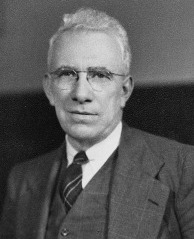
Nominee	George Aiken
Party	Republican
Alliance	Democratic
Popular vote	157,197
Percentage	99.89%
- Aiken: 90–100%
U.S. senator before election
George Aiken
Republican
Elected U.S. Senator
George Aiken
Republican

The 1968 United States Senate election in Vermont took place on November 5, 1968. Incumbent Republican George Aiken ran successfully for re-election to another term in the United States Senate; he was unopposed. As of 2025, this is the last time the Republicans won the Class 3 Senate seat in Vermont.

Aiken spent $17.09 (equivalent to $158 in 2025) during the campaign.

== Republican primary ==
=== Candidates ===
- George Aiken, incumbent U.S. Senator
- William K. Tufts, teacher

=== Results ===
Republican primary results
Party	Candidate	Votes	%	±%
Republican	George Aiken (Incumbent)	42,248	72.8%	
Republican	William K. Tufts	15,786	27.2%	
Republican	Other	28	0.0%	
Total votes		58,062	100.0%	

== Democratic primary ==
=== Candidates ===
- Philip H. Hoff, incumbent Governor of Vermont

=== Results ===
Democratic primary results
Party	Candidate	Votes	%	±%
Write-In	George Aiken (Incumbent)	1,534	61.8%	
Write-In	Philip H. Hoff	400	18.2%	
Democratic	Other	438	20.0%	
Total votes		2,192	100.0%	

== General election ==
=== Results ===
United States Senate election in Vermont, 1968
Party	Candidate	Votes	%	±%
Republican	George Aiken (Incumbent)	94,738	60.20%	−6.63%
Democratic	George Aiken (Incumbent)	62,416	39.66%	+6.49%
No party	George Aiken (Incumbent)	43	0.03%	N/A
Total	George Aiken (Incumbent)	157,197	99.89%	N/A
N/A	Other	178	0.11%	N/A
Total votes		157,375	100.00%	

== See also ==
- 1968 United States Senate elections
