= Ernest E. Moore =

American politician (1881–1962)

Ernest E. Moore (February 10, 1881 – May 16, 1962) was a Vermont attorney and politician who served as Speaker of the Vermont House of Representatives.

== Biography ==
Ernest Ephraim Moore was born in Plymouth, Vermont on February 10, 1881 and his family was related to the family of Calvin Coolidge through Coolidge's mother Victoria Moore (or Moor) Coolidge.

Moore graduated from Williams College in 1906 and the University of Pittsburgh School of Law in 1908. He was admitted to the bar and established a practice in Ludlow.

A Republican, Moore was elected to the Vermont House of Representatives in 1914 and served two terms, 1915 to 1919. During his second term he was Chairman of the House Ways and Means Committee.

In 1919 Moore took office as Windsor County State's Attorney. In 1921 he became county Probate Judge, an office in which he served until his death.

In 1934 Moore was again elected to the Vermont House. He served one term, during which he was Speaker.

Moore also agreed in 1934 to lead an effort to place a national memorial to Coolidge in Plymouth.

In 1936 he was an unsuccessful candidate for governor, losing the Republican primary to George Aiken, who went on to win the general election.

Moore died in Ludlow on May 16, 1962. He was buried at Pleasant View Cemetery in Ludlow.

Political offices
Preceded by George Aiken	Speaker of the Vermont House of Representatives; 1935–1937	Succeeded by Mortimer R. Proctor
