= St. Albans, Vermont =

St. Albans, Vermont may refer to:

- St. Albans (town), Vermont, established 1763, a town in Franklin County, Vermont, U.S.
- St. Albans (city), Vermont, established 1902, a city in Franklin County, Vermont, U.S.

== See also ==
- St. Albans Bay, Vermont, an unincorporated village in the town of St. Albans, Vermont, U.S.
- St. Albans Raid, the northernmost land action of the American Civil War, 1864
- St. Albans station (Vermont), the northern terminus of the Vermonter train service
