= Porter H. Dale =

American politician (1867–1933)

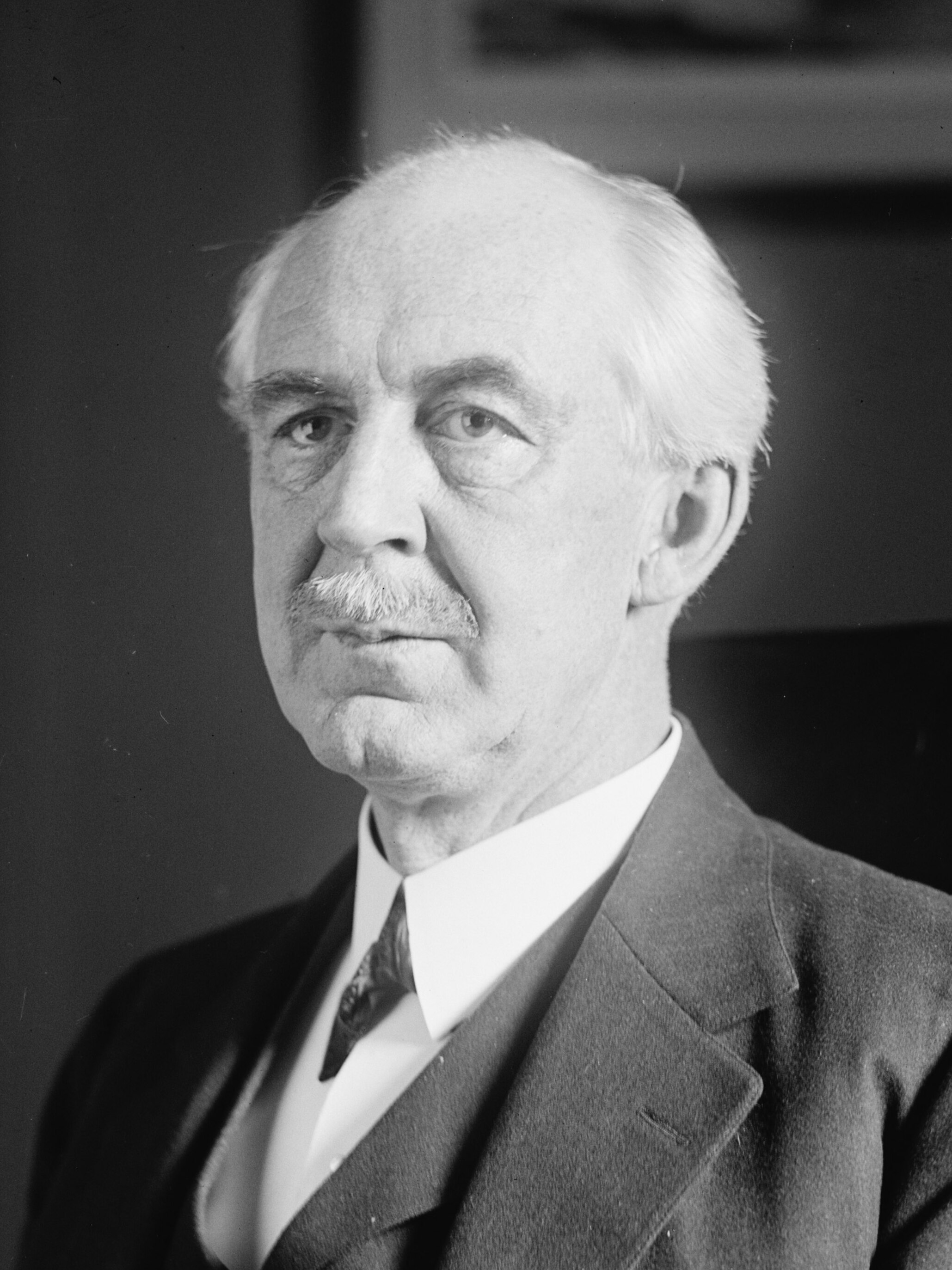

United States Senator from Vermont
- In office November 7, 1923 – October 6, 1933
- Preceded by: William P. Dillingham
- Succeeded by: Ernest W. Gibson

Member of the United States House of Representatives from Vermont's 2nd district
- In office March 4, 1915 – August 11, 1923
- Preceded by: Frank Plumley
- Succeeded by: Ernest W. Gibson

Member of the Vermont Senate from Essex County
- In office 1910–1914
- Preceded by: Martin Van Buren Vance
- Succeeded by: Elmer Reed

Judge of the Brighton, Vermont Municipal Court
- In office 1910–1911
- Preceded by: Herbert W. Blake
- Succeeded by: E. J. Parsons

Personal details
- Born: Porter Hinman Dale; March 1, 1867 Island Pond, Vermont
- Died: October 6, 1933 (aged 66) Westmore, Vermont
- Resting place: Lakeside Cemetery, Island Pond, Vermont
- Party: Republican
- Spouse(s): Amy K. Bartlett (m. 1891–1907, her death); Augusta M. Wood (m. 1910–1933, his death)
- Relations: George N. Dale (father)
- Children: 4
- Education: Eastman Business College
- Profession: Attorney

Military service
- Allegiance: Vermont
- Branch/service: Vermont Militia
- Years of service: 1896–1898
- Rank: Colonel
- Unit: Staff of Governor Josiah Grout
- Battles/wars: Spanish–American War

Porter Hinman Dale (March 1, 1867 – October 6, 1933) was an American educator, lawyer, and politician who served as a member of both the United States House of Representatives from 1915 to 1923, and the United States Senate from Vermont from 1923 to 1933.

== Early life and career ==
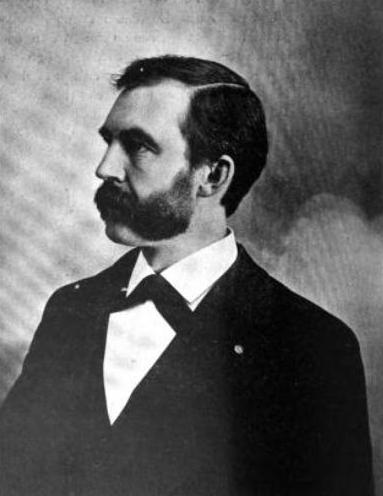
Porter H. Dale as candidate for Congress, 1898

The son of Lieutenant Governor George N. Dale and Helen (Hinman) Dale, Porter Dale was born in Island Pond, Vermont on March 1, 1867.

Dale attended public schools in his hometown and went on to study at Eastman Business College. Later he studied in Philadelphia and Boston, and he spent two years studying elocution and oratory with James Edward Murdoch, a Shakespearean scholar and actor.

Upon completion of his education, he taught school at the Green Mountain Seminary in Waterbury, Vermont, and at Bates College in Lewiston, Maine. Dale then studied law with his father, was admitted to the bar in 1896, and practiced in Island Pond. After the death of his father, Dale practiced in partnership with Harry B. Amey.

Dale served as chief deputy collector of customs at Island Pond from 1897 to 1910, when he resigned and was appointed judge of the Brighton municipal court. He also served in the state militia as colonel on the staff of Governor Josiah Grout, and he was also involved in the lumber, electric, and banking businesses.

In 1900 he was an unsuccessful candidate for the Republican nomination in the election for Vermont's Second District seat in the U.S. House. Dale was elected to the Vermont State Senate in 1910 and served two two-year terms.

== House of Representatives ==
In 1914, Dale was a candidate for the Republican U.S. House nomination in Vermont's 2nd District. He defeated Alexander Dunnett on the 21st ballot at the state party convention, and went on to win the general election. He served from March 4, 1915, to August 11, 1923, when he resigned to become a candidate for the United States Senate. Dale served as chairman of the Committee on Expenditures in the Department of the Treasury during the Sixty-Sixth and Sixty-Seventh Congresses.

=== First inauguration of Calvin Coolidge ===
Dale was campaigning for the Senate on the night of August 2, 1923, when he heard of the death of President Warren G. Harding. Calvin Coolidge was staying at the home of his father John Calvin Coolidge Sr. in Plymouth, Vermont, and Dale traveled to the Coolidge home to ensure that Coolidge was informed and to offer his assistance. By most accounts, it was Dale who suggested persistently that Coolidge be sworn in immediately to ensure continuity in the presidency, and Dale witnessed Coolidge receiving the oath of office from John Coolidge early on the morning of August 3. Dale drafted and revised a written account of this event, which his grandson Porter H. Dale II and great-grandson Christopher Dale later discovered and published in the Journal of Vermont History in 1994.

== U.S. Senate ==
Dale was elected to the United States Senate on November 6, 1923, for the remainder of the term ending March 3, 1927, which had been made vacant by the death of William P. Dillingham. Dale was reelected in 1926 and 1932, and served from November 7, 1923, until his death. He was chairman of the Committee on Civil Service (Sixty-ninth through Seventy-second Congresses).

== Death and burial ==
Dale died at his summer home on Lake Willoughby in Westmore, Vermont on October 6, 1933. He was buried in Lakeside Cemetery in Island Pond.

== Family ==
In 1891, Dale married Amy K. Bartlett (b. 1861) of Island Pond. She died on August 1, 1907, and in 1910 he married Augusta M. Wood (1876–1961) of Boston. With his first wife, Dale was the father of Marian (1892–1975), Timothy (1894–1977), Amy (1895–1938), and George (1898–1962).

== See also ==
- List of members of the United States Congress who died in office (1900–1949)

Party political offices
Preceded by William P. Dillingham	Republican nominee for U.S. Senator from Vermont (Class 3); 1923, 1926, 1932	Succeeded by Ernest Willard Gibson
U.S. House of Representatives
Preceded by Frank Plumley	United States Representative from Vermont (2nd); 1915-1923	Succeeded by Ernest Willard Gibson
U.S. Senate
Preceded by William P. Dillingham	United States Senator (Class 3) from Vermont; 1923-1933	Succeeded by Ernest Willard Gibson
