= 1934 United States Senate election in Vermont =

- January 16, 1934
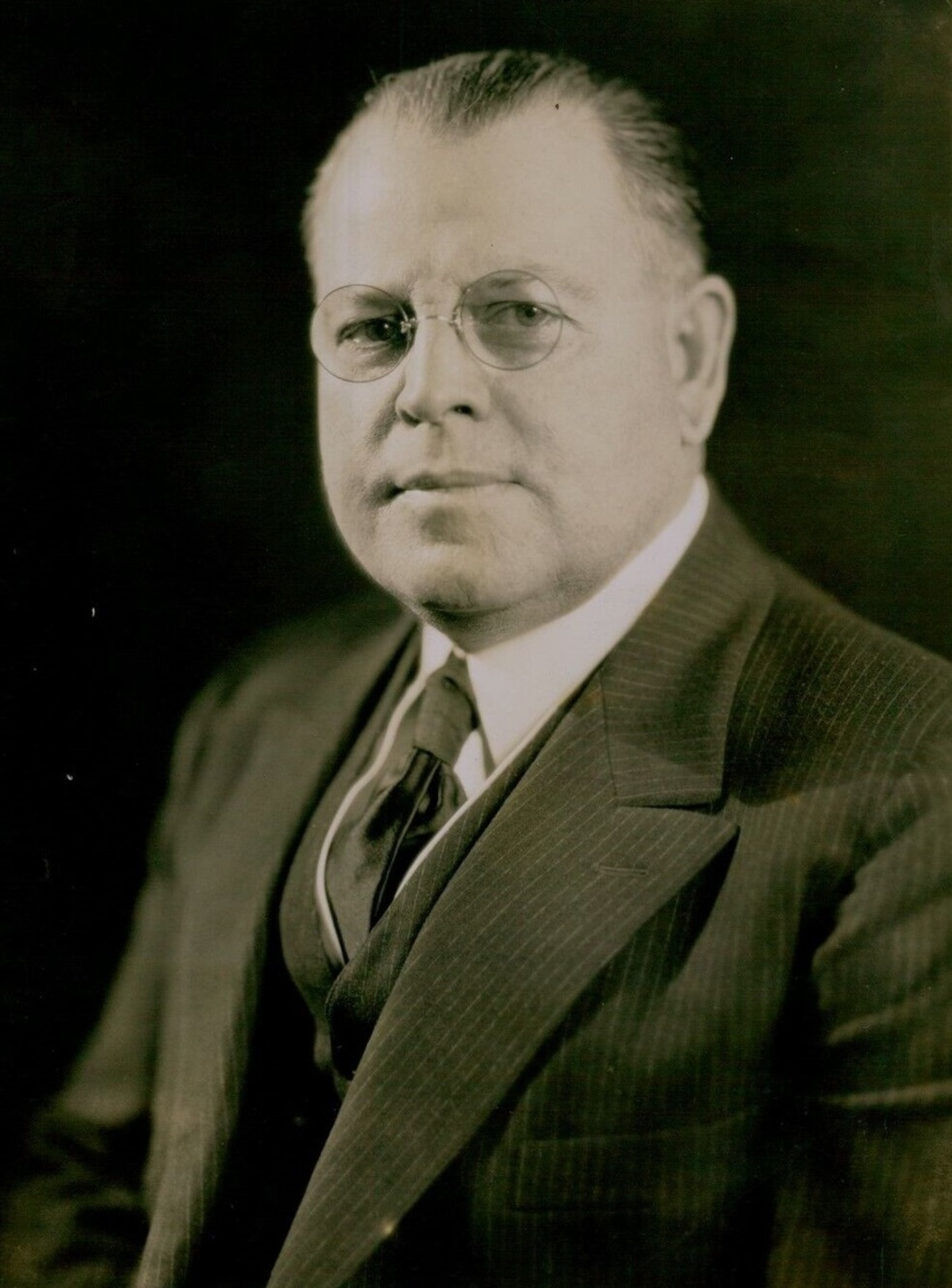

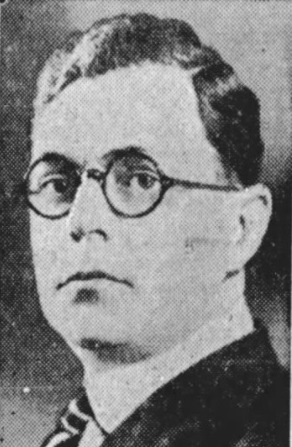
Nominee	Warren Austin	Fred C. Martin
Party	Republican	Democratic
Popular vote	67,146	63,632
Percentage	51.0%	48.4%
- County results Austin: 50–60% 60–70% 70–80% Martin: 50–60%
U.S. senator before election
Warren Austin
Republican
Elected U.S. Senator
Warren Austin
Republican

The 1934 United States Senate election in Vermont took place on November 6, 1934. Incumbent Republican Warren Austin successfully ran for re-election to a full term in the United States Senate, defeating Democratic candidate Fred C. Martin. Austin was elected in a 1931 special election to replace Frank C. Partridge, who was appointed to fill the vacancy created by the death of Frank L. Greene. To date, Martin's 48.37% vote share remains the largest a Democrat has ever received for Vermont's Class I Senate seat.

== Republican primary ==
=== Candidates ===
- Harry B. Amey, former United States Attorney for the District of Vermont and State Senator from Island Pond
- Warren Austin, incumbent Senator since 1931

=== Campaign ===
Senator Austin undertook an extensive advertising and letter-writing campaign but did not directly address his opponent, who was not considered a strong threat.

=== Results ===
1934 Republican Senate primary
Party	Candidate	Votes	%
Republican	Warren Austin (incumbent)	44,507	75.06%
Republican	Harry B. Amey	14,731	24.84%
Write-in		57	0.01%
Total votes		59,295	100.00%

== Democratic primary ==
=== Candidates ===
- Fred C. Martin, Collector of Internal Revenue for Vermont and nominee for Senate in 1928

=== Results ===
1934 Democratic Senate primary
Party	Candidate	Votes	%
Democratic	Fred C. Martin	7,870	99.80%
Write-in		16	0.20%
Total votes		7,886	100.00%

== General election ==
=== Results ===
1934 U.S. Senate election in Vermont
Party	Candidate	Votes	%	±%
Republican	Warren Austin (incumbent)	67,146	51.04%	▼12.98
Democratic	Fred C. Martin	63,632	48.37%	▲12.82
Write-in		3	0.00%	▼0.42
Total votes		131,552	100.00%	
