= 1928 United States Senate election in Vermont =

- November 6, 1928
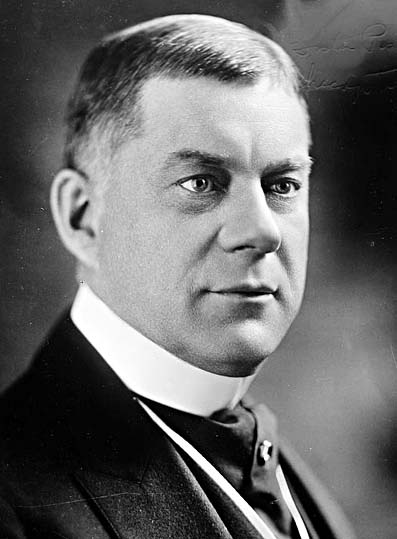

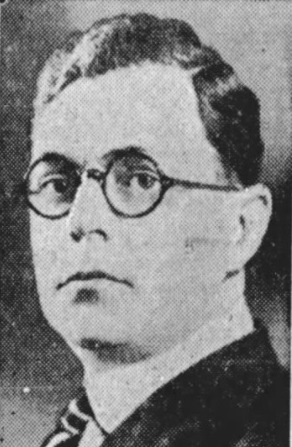
Nominee	Frank L. Greene	Fred C. Martin
Party	Republican	Democratic
Popular vote	93,136	37,030
Percentage	71.55%	28.45%
- Greene: 50–60% 60–70% 70–80% 80–90% >90% Martin: 50–60% 60–70% 80–90%
U.S. senator before election
Frank L. Greene
Republican
Elected U.S. Senator
Frank L. Greene
Republican

The 1928 United States Senate election in Vermont took place on November 6, 1928. Incumbent Republican Frank L. Greene successfully ran for re-election to another term in the United States Senate, defeating Democratic candidate Fred C. Martin. Greene died in December 1930 and Frank C. Partridge was appointed to fill the seat until a special election could be held in March 1931.

== Republican primary ==
=== Results ===
Republican primary results
Party	Candidate	Votes	%	±%
Republican	Frank L. Greene (inc.)	53,879	99.9	
Republican	Other	29	0.1	
Total votes		53,908	100.0	

== Democratic primary ==
=== Results ===
Democratic primary results
Party	Candidate	Votes	%	±%
Democratic	Fred C. Martin	3,060	99.5	
Democratic	Other	14	0.5	
Total votes		3,074	100.0	

== General election ==
=== Results ===
United States Senate election in Vermont, 1928
Party	Candidate	Votes	%	±%
Republican	Frank L. Greene (inc.)	93,136	71.55%	+6.02%
Democratic	Fred C. Martin	37,030	28.45%	−2.50%
Total votes		130,166	100.00%	

== See also ==
- United States Senate elections, 1928
