= Harry B. Amey =

American attorney and politician (1868-1949)

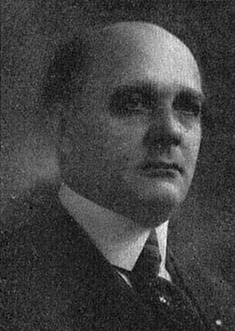

United States Attorney for the District of Vermont
- In office 1923–1933
- President: Calvin Coolidge; Herbert Hoover
- Preceded by: Vernon A. Bullard
- Succeeded by: Joseph A. McNamara

Member of the Vermont Senate from Essex County
- In office 1919–1921
- Preceded by: George A. Hubbard
- Succeeded by: Luther A. Cobb

Member of the Vermont House of Representatives from Brighton
- In office 1908–1910
- Preceded by: Oscar T. Davis
- Succeeded by: Don Carlos Foss Jr.

State's Attorney of Essex County, Vermont
- In office 1904–1908
- Preceded by: Henry W. Lund
- Succeeded by: George L. Hunt
- In office 1910–1912
- Preceded by: George L. Hunt
- Succeeded by: Claire R. Powell

Personal details
- Born: December 21, 1868 Pittsburg, New Hampshire
- Died: December 6, 1949 (aged 80) Island Pond, Vermont
- Resting place: Indian Stream Cemetery, Pittsburg, New Hampshire
- Party: Republican
- Spouse(s): Grace A. Norton (1876–1931) (m. 1897); Harriet May Hardy (1881-1968) (m. 1932)
- Children: 2
- Education: Dartmouth College
- Profession: Attorney

Harry B. Amey (December 21, 1868 – December 6, 1949) was a Vermont attorney and public official. He is notable for his service as state's attorney of Essex County, a member of the Vermont House of Representatives and Vermont Senate, and as United States Attorney for the District of Vermont from 1923 to 1932.

A native of Pittsburg, New Hampshire, Amey graduated from Dartmouth College in 1894, studied law with an attorney in Milton, New Hampshire, and attained admission to the bar in 1898. He relocated to the Brighton, Vermont, village of Island Pond in 1902, where he continued to practice law. A Republican, he served as Essex County State's Attorney (1904–1908, 1910–1912), member of the Vermont House from Brighton (1910–1912), and member of the State Senate from Essex County (1919–1923).

In 1923, Amey was appointed Vermont's U.S. Attorney, and he served until 1933. In 1934, he was an unsuccessful candidate for U.S. Senator, losing the Republican primary to incumbent Warren Austin. He died in Island Pond on December 6, 1949, and was buried at Indian Stream Cemetery in Pittsburg, New Hampshire.

== Early life ==
Harry Burton Amey was born in Pittsburg, New Hampshire, on December 21, 1868, the son of John Tillotson and Emily (Haynes) Amey. he attended the local schools and received his Bachelor of Arts degree from Dartmouth College in 1894. He was a school teacher and principal while he studied law with an attorney in Milton, New Hampshire. Amey attained admission to the bar in 1898, and began to practice in Milton.

== Continued career ==
Amey moved to Island Pond, Vermont, in 1902 and practiced law in partnership with Porter H. Dale. The partnership proved a success, and Amey's clients included the Central Vermont Railway. He became active in politics as a Republican, and served as state's attorney of Essex County from 1904 to 1908, and again from 1910 to 1912.

From 1910 to 1912, Amey represented the town of Brighton in the Vermont House of Representatives, succeeding Oscar T. Davis and being succeeded by Don Carlos Foss Jr. In 1918 he was elected to represent Essex County in the Vermont Senate, succeeding George A. Hubbard. He served 1919 to 1921, and was succeeded by Luther A. Cobb.

== U.S. Attorney ==
In 1923, Amey was appointed United States Attorney for the District of Vermont, succeeding Vernon A. Bullard. He served until 1933, and was succeeded by Joseph A. McNamara.

== Later career ==
After resigning as U.S. Attorney, Amey continued to practice law in partnership with Porter Dale's son George. In 1934, he made a quixotic run for U.S. Senator and was handily defeated in the Republican primary by incumbent Warren Austin.

== Death and burial ==
Amey died in Island Pond on December 6, 1949. He was buried in his family's plot at Indian Stream Cemetery in Pittsburg, New Hampshire.

== Family ==
Amey's first wife was Grace (or Gracia) A. Norton (1876–1931), with whom he had two children, son Henry Tillotson Amey (1897–1975) and daughter Alpha Norton Amey (1899–1977), the wife of Benjamin Franklin Heath (1900–1973). His second wife was Harriet May Hardy (1881–1968).

== Sources ==
=== Newspapers.com ===
- "Wedding Announcement, Gracia A. Norton and Harry B. Amey". Orleans County Monitor. Barton, VT. May 17, 1897 – via Newspapers.com.
- "Personal: Harry B. Amey". Essex County Herald. Island Pond, VT. August 5, 1898 – via Newspapers.com.
- "Amey Succeeds Bullard". Newport Express and Standard. Newport, VT. June 8, 1923 – via Newspapers.com.
- "New U.S. District Attorney Takes Office Today". Burlington Free Press. Burlington, VT. July 1, 1933 – via Newspapers.com.
- "Harry Amey, 80, Dies; Former U.S. District Attorney". Burlington Free Press. Burlington, VT. December 7, 1949 – via Newspapers.com.

=== Books ===
- Bailey, Guy W. (1908). Manual of the Legislature of Vermont (1908). Montpelier, VT: Vermont Secretary of State.
- Bailey, Guy W. (1910). Vermont Legislative Directory and State Manual (1910). Montpelier, VT: Vermont Secretary of State.
- Bailey, Guy W. (1912). Vermont Legislative Directory and State Manual (1912). Montpelier, VT: Vermont Secretary of State.
- Bailey, Guy W. (1917). Vermont Legislative Directory and State Manual (1917). Montpelier, VT: Vermont Secretary of State.
- Bailey, Guy W. (1919). Vermont Legislative Directory and State Manual (1919). Montpelier, VT: Vermont Secretary of State.
- Black, Harry A. (1921). Vermont Legislative Directory and State Manual (1921). Montpelier, VT: Vermont Secretary of State.
- Distinguished Successful Americans of Our Day. Chicago, IL: Successful Americans. 1912.
- Spencer, Thomas E. (1998). Where They're Buried. Baltimore, MD: Clearfield Company. ISBN 978-0-8063-4823-0.

=== Internet ===
- Vermont State Archives (June 9, 2006). "Primary Election Results, 1934" (PDF). sec.state.vt.us. Montpelier, VT: Vermont Secretary of State.
