= Joseph A. McNamara =

American judge

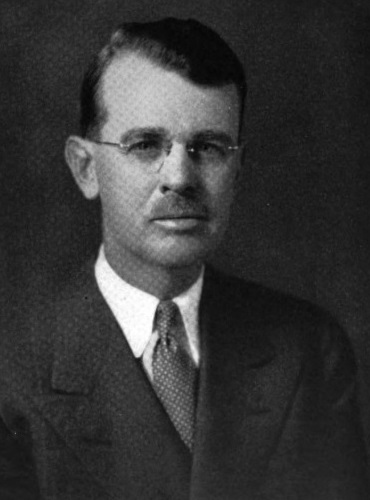
- From Volume 3 of 1940's The Lake Champlain and Lake George Valleys

United States Attorney for Vermont
- In office 1933–1953
- Appointed by: Franklin D. Roosevelt
- Preceded by: Harry B. Amey
- Succeeded by: Louis G. Whitcomb

President of the Vermont Bar Association
- In office 1941–1942
- Preceded by: Horace H. Powers
- Succeeded by: Deane C. Davis

Judge of the Burlington, Vermont Municipal Court
- In office 1921–1923
- Preceded by: Henry B. Shaw
- Succeeded by: Clarence P. Cowles

Personal details
- Born: August 4, 1891 Fair Haven, Vermont, U.S.
- Died: March 25, 1972 (aged 79) Burlington, Vermont, U.S.
- Resting place: Resurrection Park Cemetery, South Burlington, Vermont
- Spouse: Mary P. Magner (m. 1922)
- Children: 4
- Education: College of the Holy Cross (BA); Harvard University (LLB)
- Occupation: Attorney; Public official

Military service
- Allegiance: United States
- Branch/service: United States Army
- Years of service: 1918–1919
- Rank: Sergeant
- Unit: Company D, 312th Supply Train, 87th Division
- Battles/wars: World War I

Joseph A. McNamara (August 4, 1892 - March 25, 1972) was a Vermont attorney and politician. A Democrat, he was most notable for his service as United States Attorney for Vermont from 1933 to 1953.

McNamara was a native of Fair Haven, Vermont, and attended the schools of Fair Haven. He graduated from College of the Holy Cross in 1915, studied law with a Vermont attorney, and attended Harvard Law School. Leaving law school early to enter the military for World War I, McNamara served in the United States Army and attained the rank of sergeant as a member of the 87th Division.

After leaving the Army, McNamara was admitted to the bar and began to practice law in Burlington, Vermont. He became active in politics as a Democrat, and served as Burlington's municipal court judge from 1921 to 1923. After unsuccessful runs for Vermont Attorney General and the U.S. House, in 1933 McNamara was named US Attorney for Vermont. He held the post through the administrations of Democrats Franklin Roosevelt and Harry Truman, and resigned after Republican Dwight Eisenhower became president.

After leaving the US Attorney's position, McNamara continued to practice law in Burlington. He died in Burlington on March 25, 1972, and was buried at Resurrection Park Cemetery in South Burlington, Vermont.

== Early life and education ==
Joseph Augustin McNamara (sometimes spelled Augustine) was born in Fair Haven, Vermont, on August 4, 1892, the son of Catherine Foy and James McNamara, who was active in the slate manufacturing business. He attended the schools of Fair Haven, graduated from Fair Haven High School in 1910, and attended Saint Michael's College from 1910 to 1911. He then graduated from the College of the Holy Cross with his Bachelor of Arts degree in 1915.

McNamara studied law with attorney Thomas W. Moloney of Rutland and attended Harvard Law School. In 1918, he graduated from Harvard with a Bachelor of Laws—he received the school's "war diploma", which was awarded to students near to graduation who left early to enter military service. He was undergoing his initial military training at the University of Vermont in Burlington in July 1918 when he was permitted to take a special bar exam. The exam was available to recently qualified applicants who were serving in the military, and McNamara passed.

== Military service ==
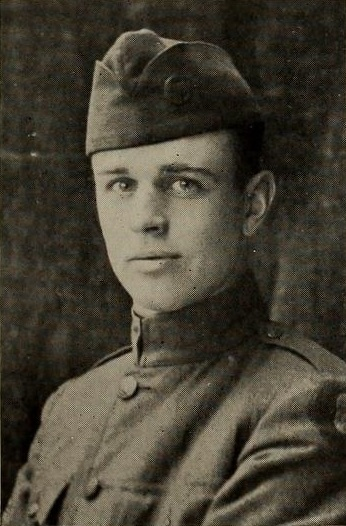
McNamara in his World War I uniform. From 1920's Holy Cross Service Record, War of 1917.

McNamara joined the United States Army in May 1918. After his initial training at the University of Vermont he was assigned to Company D, 312th Supply Train, a unit of the 87th Division.

McNamara completed his induction and training in the summer of 1918 and sailed for France, arriving on September 11. The 87th Division had not completed its final pre-combat training before the war ended in November, so its members were used as replacements for soldiers in other units who had been killed or wounded, and to construct roads, bases and other facilities. McNamara attained the rank of sergeant, and was discharged from the military in June 1919.

== Start of career ==
After leaving the Army, McNamara was admitted to the bar and began to practice in Burlington. In 1919, he was appointed assistant supervisor of the 1920 federal census in Vermont. McNamara was a Democrat during the era when the Republicans dominated Vermont politics and government, and served as an election inspector, chairman of the Burlington and Chittenden County Democratic Committees, and a delegate to several state and national party conventions.

Despite his party affiliation, the judge of Burlington's municipal court, Henry B. Shaw, recommended McNamara as his replacement in 1921 when Shaw resigned to become Secretary of Civil and Military Affairs (chief assistant) to Governor James Hartness. Hartness concurred and appointed McNamara, who served until 1923.

In 1924, 1926 and 1928, McNamara was the unsuccessful Democratic nominee for Vermont Attorney General. In 1930, he was the Democratic nominee in Vermont's 1st congressional district, and received 42 percent of the vote in his unsuccessful race against Republican John E. Weeks, who was the incumbent governor. Vermont's 1st and 2nd Districts were eliminated following the 1930 Census, and in 1932 McNamara was the Democratic nominee in Vermont's new at-large district. He lost to incumbent 2nd District Republican Ernest Willard Gibson by 64 percent to 36.

== United States Attorney ==
Franklin Roosevelt won the presidency in 1932, enabling him to make appointments of US Attorneys once his term commenced in March 1933. In June 1933, he appointed McNamara to succeed Harry B. Amey as the United States Attorney for Vermont. McNamara was confirmed later that month, and was sworn in on July 1, 1933.

Because the U.S. Attorney's caseload did not require a full time prosecutor, McNamara continued to practice law. In 1940, he began to practice in partnership with Robert W. Larrow as McNamara & Larrow. This firm is still in existence, and is now known as McCormick, Fitzpatrick, Kasper & Burchard, P.C.

In 1948, most Vermont political observers expected McNamara to be appointed as Vermont's U.S. District Court Judge following the death of James P. Leamy, but incumbent Republican Governor Ernest W. Gibson Jr. expressed his interest in the position to President Harry S. Truman. Truman, who had known Gibson's father Ernest Willard Gibson when they served in the United States Senate, and the younger Gibson when he served briefly as his father's appointed replacement, admired the younger Gibson's World War II military career and the progressive political record he built as governor. Despite the difference in their party affiliations, these factors caused Truman to nominate Gibson for the judgeship.

McNamara resigned as US Attorney in October 1953, after the election of Republican Dwight D. Eisenhower to the presidency, enabling Eisenhower to name a Republican to the position. Eisenhower appointed Louis G. Whitcomb, who served until 1961.

== Later career ==
After leaving office, McNamara continued to practice law in Burlington. Among his notable cases was his defense in 1966 and 1967 of State Senator and Vermont Democratic Party chairman Frederick J. Fayette, who was accused of accepting a bribe to influence the appointment of the postmaster in St. Johnsbury. Fayette was convicted and fined $300, and his conviction was affirmed on appeal.

== Civic and professional memberships ==
From 1941 to 1942, McNamara served as president of the Vermont Bar Association.

McNamara was a member of the Burlington Country Club, Ethan Allen Club, Elks, American Legion, and Veterans of Foreign Wars. He was an associate trustee of Saint Michael's College, and a fourth degree member of the Knights of Columbus.

== Death and burial ==
McNamara died in Burlington on March 25, 1972. He was buried at Resurrection Park Cemetery in South Burlington, Vermont.

== Honors ==
In 1925, Holy Cross awarded McNamara the honorary degree of Master of Arts, and he received an honorary LL.D. from Holy Cross in 1953.

== Family ==
In 1922, McNamara married Mary P. Magner. They were the parents of son James J. and daughters Maureen, Nancy (Mrs. Clifton Harris) and Martha (Mrs. Russell Mahoney).

== Sources ==
=== Newspapers ===
- "To Train for Special Service". Poultney Journal. Poultney, VT. May 17, 1918 – via Newspapers.com.
- "Soldiers Pass Their Bar Examinations". Burlington Free Press. Burlington, VT. July 4, 1918 – via Newspapers.com.
- "Assistant Supervisor: Census Appointment Falls to J.A. McNamara of This City". Burlington Free Press. Burlington, VT. November 3, 1919 – via Newspapers.com.
- "City News: Joseph A. McNamara". Burlington Free Press. Burlington, VT. October 1, 1921 – via Newspapers.com.
- "City and Municipal Judges Are Named". Vermont Standard. Woodstock, VT. February 1, 1923 – via Newspapers.com.
- "Honorary Degrees This Month". Fitchburg Sentinel. Fitchburg, MA. Associated Press. June 2, 1925 – via Newspapers.com.
- "New U.S. District Attorney Takes Office Today". Burlington Free Press. Burlington, VT. July 1, 1933 – via Newspapers.com.
- "State's Functions Are Curtailed, Judge Harrie Chase Tells State Bar". Burlington Free Press. Burlington, VT. October 9, 1941 – via Newspapers.com.
- "Deane C. Davis of Barre Inducted as President of the Bar Association". Burlington Free Press. Burlington, VT. October 8, 1942 – via Newspapers.com.
- "Joseph McNamara Will Get Honorary Holy Cross Degree". Burlington Free Press. Burlington, VT. May 22, 1953 – via Newspapers.com.
- "L. Whitcomb Appointed U.S. Attorney for Vt". Burlington Free Press. Burlington, VT. October 1, 1953 – via Newspapers.com.
- "Fayette Appeals Influence Case". Burlington Free Press. Burlington, VT. January 20, 1967 – via Newspapers.com.
- "Joseph McNamara, Noted Lawyer, Dies". Burlington Free Press. Burlington, VT. March 27, 1972 – via Newspapers.com.

=== Books ===
- Crockett, Walter Hill (1923). Vermont, The Green Mountain State. Vol. 5. New York, NY: Century History Company.
- Dinneen, Joseph S. (1920). Holy Cross Service Record, War of 1917. Worcester, MA: Holy Cross College.
- Lamb, Wallace E. (1940). The Lake Champlain and Lake George Valleys. Vol. 3. New York, NY: The American Historical Company, Inc.
- Rinaldi, Richard A. (2005). The Us Army In World War I: Orders Of Battle. Takoma Park, MD: General Data LLC. ISBN 978-0-9720296-4-3.
- Directory and Decennial Record of Alumni. Worcester, MA: Holy Cross College. 1920.

=== Internet ===
- Campbell, Ralph P. (August 25, 1918). "Outgoing Passenger List, SS Waimana". Ancestry.com. Hoboken, NJ: U.S. Army Transport Service, Hoboken Port of Embarkation.
- "About Us: Firm History". mc-fitz.com. Burlington, VT: McCormick, Fitzpatrick, Kasper & Burchard, P.C.
- "United States of America, Appellee, v. Frederick J. Fayette, Appellant, 388 F.2d 728 (2d Cir. 1968)". Law.justia.com. Mountain View, CA: Justia.
- "Candidate View: Joseph A. McNamara". Vermont Elections Database. Montpelier, VT: Vermont Secretary of State. Archived from the original on December 24, 2018.
