= 1931 United States Senate special election in Vermont =

- March 31, 1931
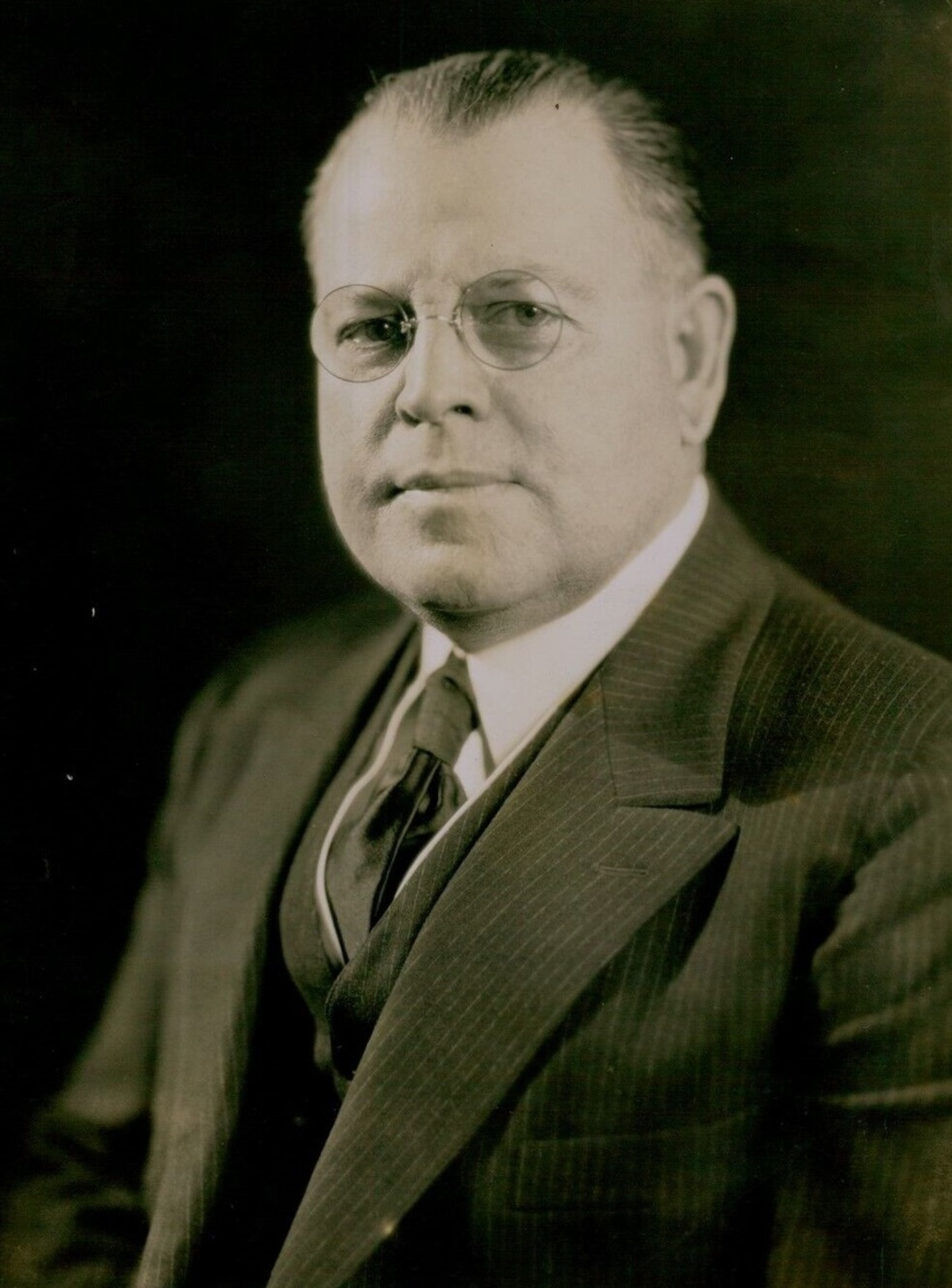

Nominee	Warren Austin	Stephen Driscoll
Party	Republican	Democratic
Popular vote	27,661	15,360
Percentage	64.02%	35.55%
- Austin: 50–60% 60–70% 70–80% 80–90% >90% Driscoll: 50–60% 60–70% 70–80%
U.S. senator before election
Frank C. Partridge
Republican
Elected U.S. Senator
Warren Austin
Republican

The 1931 United States Senate special election in Vermont took place on March 31, 1931. Republican Warren Austin was elected to the United States Senate to serve the remainder of the deceased Frank L. Greene's term, defeating Democratic candidate Stephen M. Driscoll. Austin replaced Frank C. Partridge, who was appointed to fill the seat until a special election could be held and was defeated in the special primary.

== Background ==
Frank L. Greene was elected to represent Vermont in the United States Senate in 1922 and re-elected in 1928. On December 17, 1930, Senator Greene died from complications during hernia surgery.

On December 23, Governor John E. Weeks appointed Frank C. Partridge to fill the vacant seat until a successor could be duly elected. A special election to complete the remainder of Greene's unexpired term (until March 1935) was scheduled for March 31, 1931.

== Republican primary ==
=== Candidates ===
- Warren Austin, Burlington attorney and former mayor of St. Albans City
- Frank C. Partridge, attorney, diplomat, and interim U.S. Senator

=== Results ===
Republican primary results
Party	Candidate	Votes	%	±%
Republican	Warren Austin	43,457	55.1	
Republican	Frank C. Partridge (incumbent)	35,416	44.9	
Republican	Other	21	0.0	
Total votes		78,894	100.0	

== Democratic primary ==
=== Results ===
Democratic primary results
Party	Candidate	Votes	%	±%
Democratic	Stephen M. Driscoll	1,836	98.9	
Democratic	Other	21	1.1	
Total votes		1,857	100.0	

== General election ==
=== Results ===
United States Senate special election in Vermont, 1931
Party	Candidate	Votes	%	±%
Republican	Warren Austin	27,661	64.02%	−7.53%
Democratic	Stephen M. Driscoll	15,360	35.55%	+7.10%
N/A	Other	183	0.42%	N/A
Total votes		43,204	100.00%	

== See also ==
- 72nd United States Congress
