= Warren Austin =

American politician and diplomat (1877–1962)

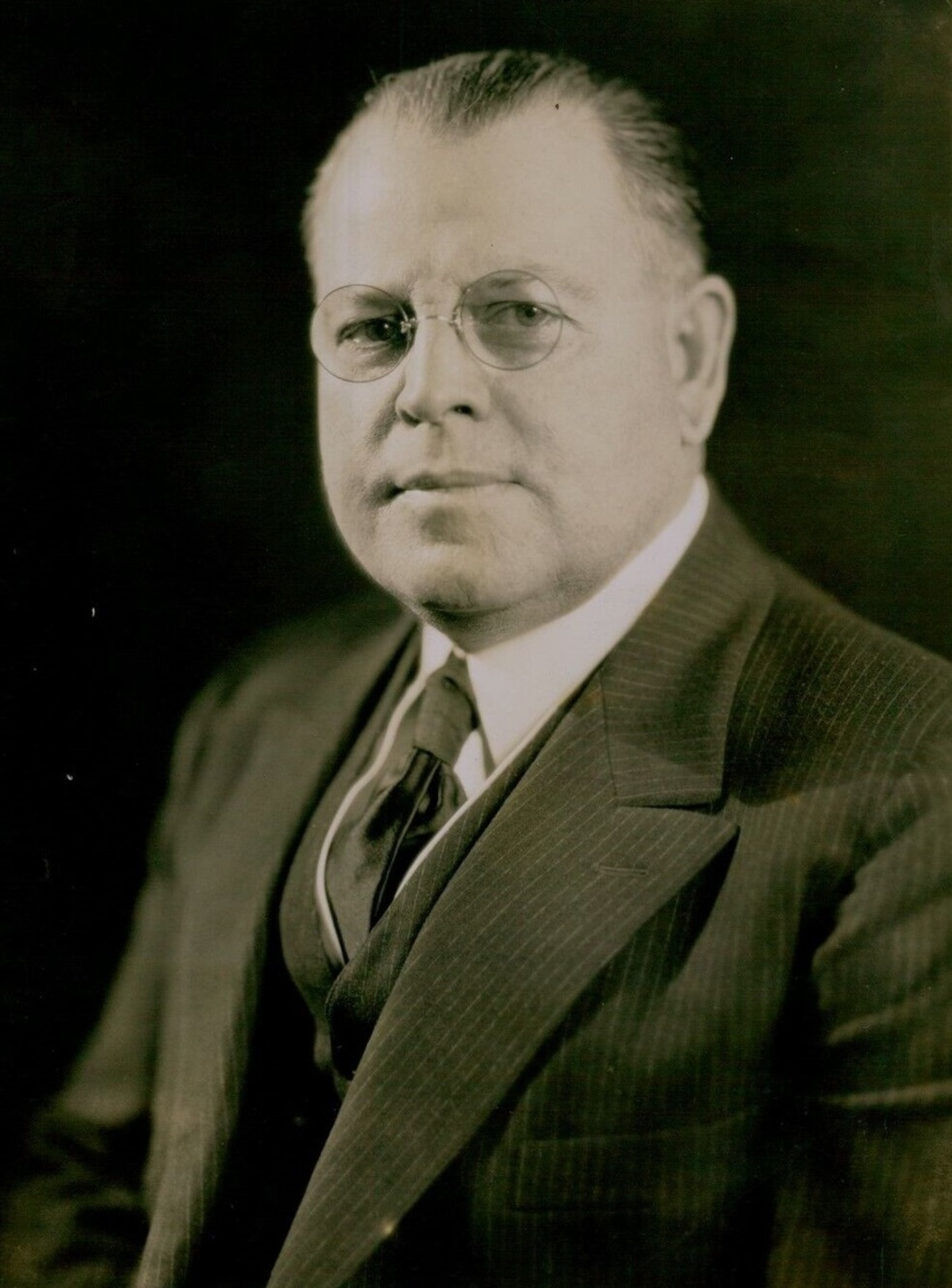
- Austin in 1931

2nd United States Ambassador to the United Nations
- In office January 14, 1947 – January 22, 1953
- President: Harry S. Truman; Dwight D. Eisenhower
- Preceded by: Herschel Johnson (acting)
- Succeeded by: Henry Cabot Lodge Jr.

Senate Minority Leader
- Acting
- In office January 3, 1940 – January 3, 1941
- Preceded by: Charles L. McNary
- Succeeded by: Charles L. McNary

United States Senator from Vermont
- In office April 1, 1931 – August 2, 1946
- Preceded by: Frank C. Partridge
- Succeeded by: Ralph Flanders

Mayor of St. Albans, Vermont
- In office March 3, 1909 – March 2, 1910
- Preceded by: Norman Atwood
- Succeeded by: Selden Greene

State's Attorney of Franklin County, Vermont
- In office December 1, 1904 – November 30, 1906
- Preceded by: Wallace Locklin
- Succeeded by: Frederick Tupper

Personal details
- Born: Warren Robinson Austin; November 12, 1877 Highgate, Vermont, U.S.
- Died: December 25, 1962 (aged 85) Burlington, Vermont, U.S.
- Resting place: Lakeview Cemetery
- Party: Republican
- Spouse: Mildred Lucas (m. 1901)
- Relatives: Roswell M. Austin (brother)
- Education: University of Vermont (PhB)

Warren Robinson Austin (November 12, 1877 – December 25, 1962) was an American politician and diplomat who served as United States Senator from Vermont and U.S. Ambassador to the United Nations.

A native of Highgate Center, Vermont, Austin was educated in Highgate and Bakersfield, and also studied in Quebec to learn French. He graduated from the University of Vermont in 1899, studied law with his father, was admitted to the bar in 1902, and practiced in partnership with his father.

Austin settled in St. Albans, became active in politics as a Republican, and served in several local offices, including Grand Juror, Chairman of the city Republican committee, and State's Attorney of Franklin County (1904–1906). In 1908, he was chairman of the state Republican convention, and he served as Mayor of St. Albans from 1909 to 1910. From 1907 to 1915, Austin was a Commissioner for the United States Court of Appeals for the Second Circuit. In 1917, he moved to Burlington, where he continued to practice law. Austin's prominence continued to grow, and he served as a University of Vermont trustee from 1914 to 1941, and an attorney practicing before the United States Court for China from 1916 to 1917. Austin served as a special counsel for the state of Vermont from 1925 to 1927 during the process of setting the official boundary between Vermont and New Hampshire.

In 1931, Austin was elected to the U.S. Senate in a special election, defeating Frank C. Partridge, who had been appointed to fill the vacancy after the death of Frank L. Greene. From 1939 to 1942, Austin was the Senate's Assistant Minority Leader (Minority Whip). In 1946 he resigned to accept president Harry S. Truman's appointment as U.S. Ambassador to the United Nations. He took office in January, 1947, and was the first official holder of this post. Austin served until January 1953, when the Eisenhower administration took office. He resided in Burlington during his retirement, and died there in 1962. Austin was buried at Lakeview Cemetery in Burlington.

== Early life and education ==
Austin was born in Highgate, Vermont on November 12, 1877, one of six children born to Chauncey Goodrich Austin and Ann Mathilda Robinson. He attended local schools and Bakersfield's Brigham Academy and also studied in Quebec to obtain fluency in French. He graduated from the University of Vermont in 1899. He then studied law with his father, attained admission to the bar, and entered practice in 1902 in partnership with his father.

== Early career ==
A Republican, he held local offices in St. Albans, including Grand Juror and Chairman of the Republican committee. (In Vermont, Grand Jurors used to serve as city and town prosecutors. After revisions of the court system, it is now a vestige or legacy office.) In 1904 he was elected State's Attorney of Franklin County, a position he held for two years.

Austin was chairman of the Vermont Republican State Convention in 1908, and Mayor of St. Albans from 1909 to 1910.

He served as a Commissioner for the United States Court of Appeals for the Second Circuit from 1907 to 1915. In 1912, he served on the Assay Commission for the United States Mint, which reviewed Mint operations by examining and testing coins for weight and fineness.

In 1914 he was appointed a trustee of the University of Vermont, a position that he retained until 1941.

From 1916 to 1917, he practiced before the United States Court for China as the representative of the American International Corporation and the Siems-Carey Railway & Canal Company.

In 1917 Austin moved to Burlington, where he continued to practice law.

From 1925 to 1937, Austin served as a special counsel for Vermont during the process of setting the official boundary between Vermont and New Hampshire, working with John G. Sargent.

In the early 1930s, Austin employed Harold J. Arthur as a stenographer. Arthur studied law with Austin, attained admission to the bar, and later served as Governor of Vermont.

== United States Senator ==
He was elected to the Senate on March 31, 1931, defeating appointed Senator Frank C. Partridge in the special election to complete the term of the deceased Frank L. Greene. Austin took his seat the next day, and won re-election in 1934 and 1940.

In the Senate, Austin opposed the New Deal but championed internationalist causes, standing with President Franklin D. Roosevelt on issues such as Lend-Lease. He became Assistant Minority Leader (Minority Whip) in 1939, served until 1942, and acted as Minority Leader during incumbent Charles L. McNary's run for Vice President in 1940. In 1943 he became a member of the Foreign Relations Committee.

Due to a desire for partisan balance and his support for Truman's foreign policy goals, Austin was widely considered as a possible Truman nominee for the Supreme Court seat vacated by Owen Roberts in 1945. Carl Hatch pushed strongly the case for Austin. However, due to his age and Truman's lack of acquaintance with him, Austin lost out to Harold Hitz Burton. Austin resigned his Senate seat on August 2, 1946, to become the US Ambassador to the United Nations. In November, he was succeeded by Ralph E. Flanders.

== United Nations Ambassador ==
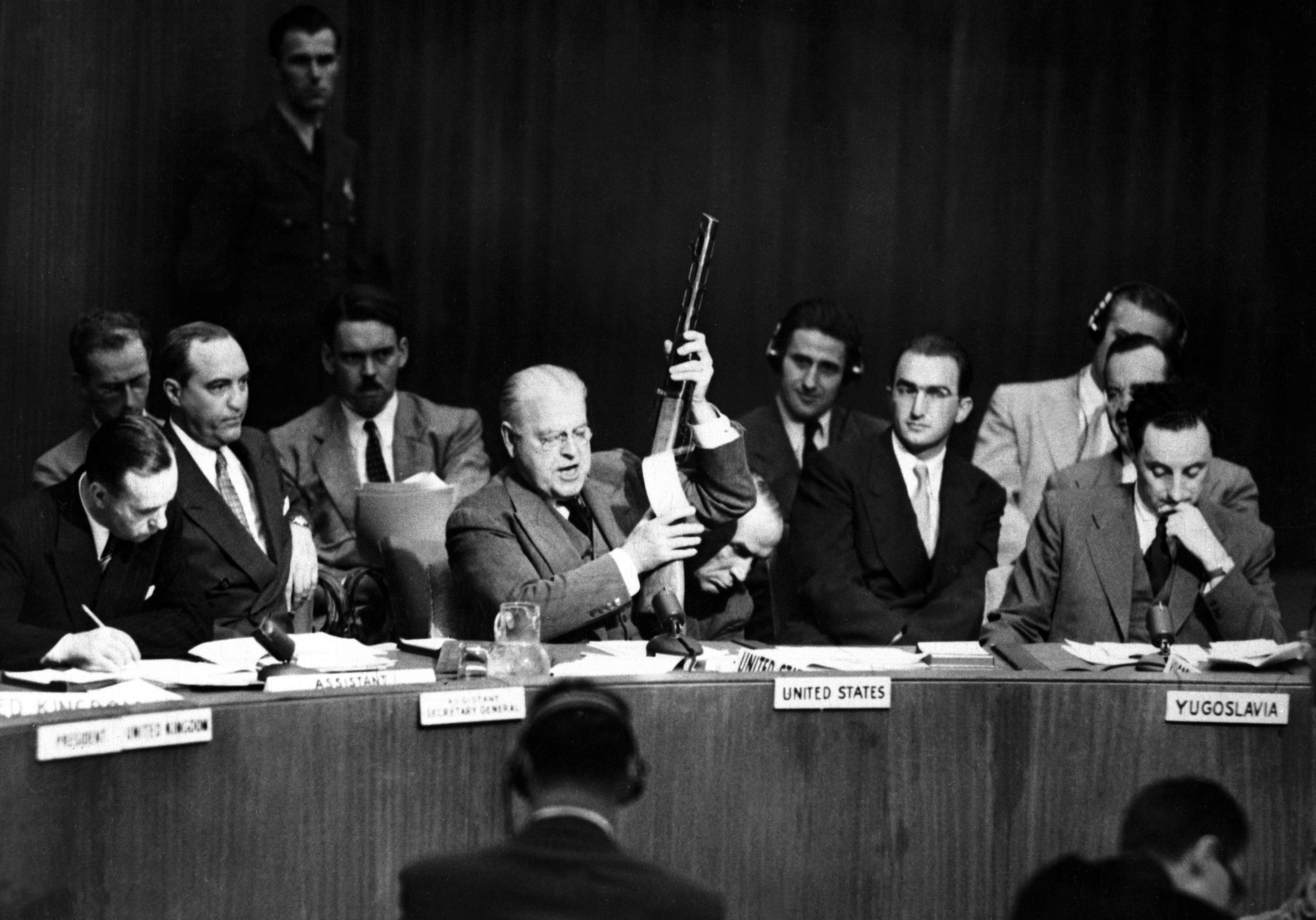
Austin demonstrates a captured Soviet-made submachine gun to the United Nations Security Council in 1951, to demonstrate Soviet support for North Korea during the Korean War.

In June 1946, President Harry S. Truman nominated Austin to be Ambassador to the United Nations. Because of the provision in the US Constitution prohibiting members of Congress from accepting an office created during their terms, he could not assume the post until January, 1947. As a result, Truman appointed Austin Special Representative to the President and advisor to UN Ambassador Herschel Johnson.

When he did take office in January, 1947 Austin was the first official U.S. Ambassador to the UN. (Edward Stettinius, Jr. and Johnson had been representatives to the United Nations Conference on International Organization, the body that established the full United Nations.)

He was a key figure at the start of the Cold War. During his term, the UN was involved in the creation of Israel and was also involved when India and Pakistan fought the Indo-Pakistani War of 1947 and were partitioned. In 1948, there was a Communist coup in Czechoslovakia, the Soviets blockaded Berlin and precipitated the Berlin Airlift, and Congress passed the Marshall Plan to rebuild Europe. In 1949, the North Atlantic Treaty Organization was created, and Mao Tse-tung established the People's Republic of China. In 1950, China annexed Tibet and North Korea invaded South Korea. The UN debated, considered responses and took action on all of these issues, and Austin became known internationally for his advocacy of Western Bloc positions.

Austin's term at the UN is also remembered for a supposed quote that is likely not completely accurate. In discussing the conflict between the Muslim Palestinian people and the Jewish people of Israel at Israel's founding, Austin supposedly said, "I hope Arabs and Jews will settle their differences in a truly Christian spirit." According to his deputy, the language of that supposed quote was inexact when it was reported by the media, and Austin was attempting to communicate that as a Christian, he would not show partiality to either Muslims or Jews in the dispute over the creation of Israel.

He retired after being succeeded by Henry Cabot Lodge Jr., in January 1953, at the start of the Eisenhower administration.

== Memberships ==
He was a member of the American Bar Association, Vermont Bar Association (president, 1923–24), American Judicature Society, Loyal Legion, Sons of the American Revolution, Society of the Cincinnati (honorary), Freemasons, Shriners, Elks, Owls, Odd Fellows, Rotary Club, and the Kappa Sigma fraternity.

== Later life ==
An amateur orchardist, Austin tended to his trees and pursued other hobbies while living in retirement in Burlington. In October 1956 he suffered a stroke that caused him to curtail many of his activities. Austin died in Burlington on December 25, 1962. He is buried at Lakeview Cemetery in Burlington.

== Honors ==
Austin received honorary degrees from Columbia University, Norwich University, Bates College, Princeton University, Lafayette College, the University of Vermont, Dartmouth College, Boston University, American University, the University of the State of New York, and the University of Santo Domingo.

He is memorialized in the Vermont State House Hall of Inscriptions.

== Family ==
In 1901 Austin married Mildred Marie Lucas. Their children included attorney Warren R. Austin Jr. (1902–1979), and career United States Army officer Edward Lucas Austin (1910–1980).

Warren Austin's brother Roswell M. Austin served as Speaker of the Vermont House of Representatives from 1925 to 1927.

Party political offices
Preceded by Frank L. Greene	Republican nominee for U.S. Senator from Vermont (Class 1); 1931, 1934, 1940	Succeeded by Ralph Flanders
Preceded by Charles L. McNary	Senate Republican Leader; Acting; 1940–1941	Succeeded by Charles L. McNary
U.S. Senate
Preceded by Frank C. Partridge	United States Senator (Class 1) from Vermont; 1931–1946; Served alongside: Porter H. Dale, Ernest Gibson (I), Ernest Gibson (II), George Aiken	Succeeded by Ralph Flanders
Preceded by Charles L. McNary	Senate Minority Leader; Acting; 1940–1941	Succeeded by Charles L. McNary
Diplomatic posts
Preceded by Herschel Johnson; Acting	United States Ambassador to the United Nations; 1947–1953	Succeeded by Henry Cabot Lodge Jr.
