= David J. Foster =

American politician (1857–1912)

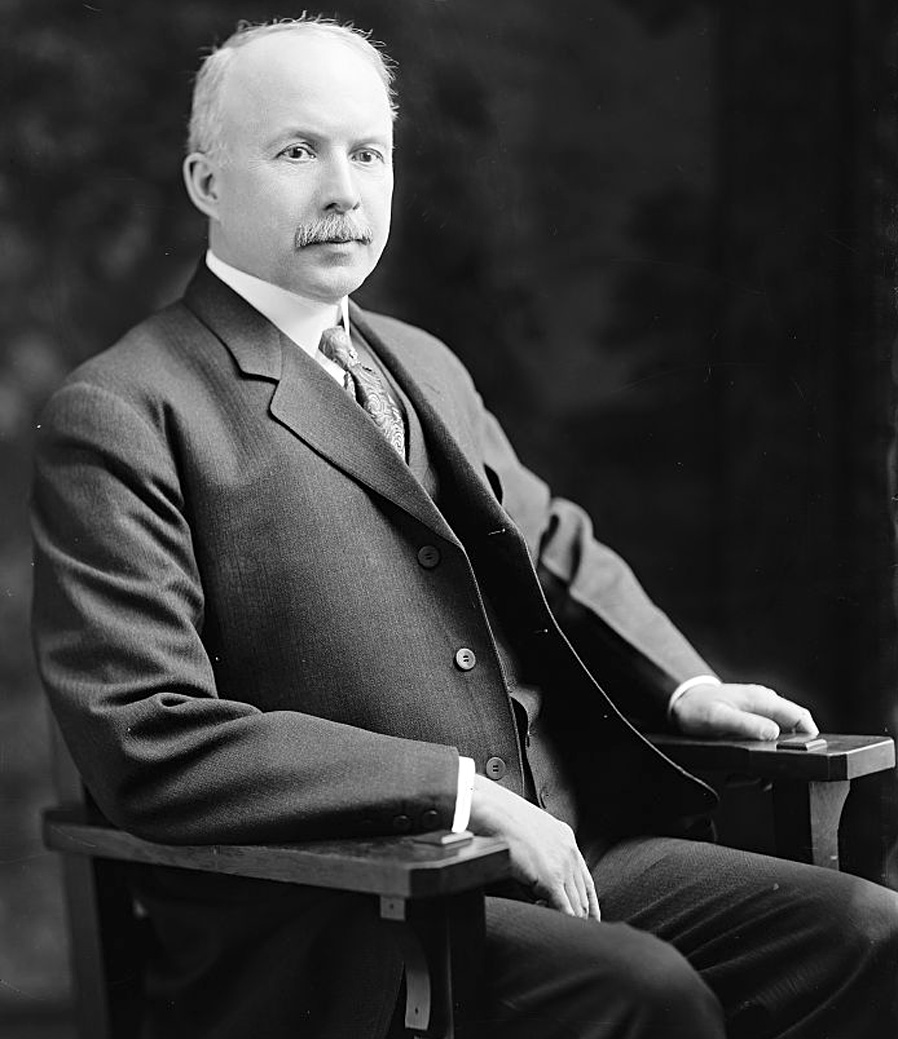

Member of the United States House of Representatives from Vermont's 1st district
- In office March 4, 1901 – March 21, 1912
- Preceded by: H. Henry Powers
- Succeeded by: Frank L. Greene

Member of the Vermont Senate
- In office October 5, 1892 – October 3, 1894 Serving with Samuel A. Brownell, Henry C. Gleason
- Preceded by: Robert Roberts, Henry H. Rankin, Isaiah Dow
- Succeeded by: Elias Lyman, Solomon H. Macomber, Robert J. White
- Constituency: Chittenden County

State's Attorney of Chittenden County, Vermont
- In office December 1, 1886 – November 30, 1890
- Preceded by: Chauncey W. Brownell
- Succeeded by: Judson E. Cushman

Personal details
- Born: June 27, 1857 Barnet, Vermont, U.S.
- Died: March 21, 1912 (aged 54) Washington, D.C., U.S.
- Party: Republican
- Spouse: Mabel M. Allen Foster
- Children: 3
- Education: Dartmouth College
- Profession: Lawyer

David Johnson Foster (June 27, 1857 – March 21, 1912) was an American lawyer and politician. He served as a U.S. representative from Vermont.

== Biography ==
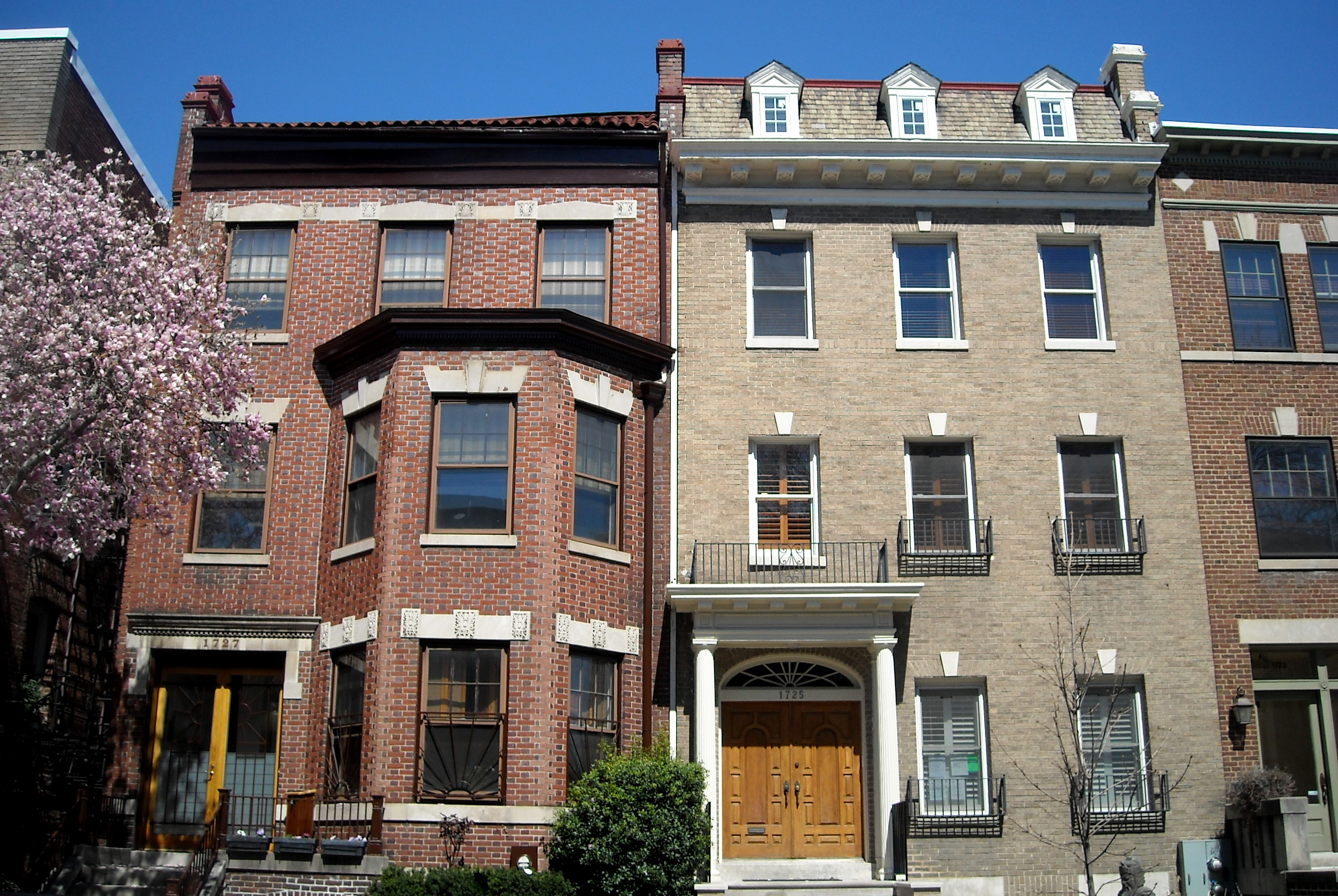
Former Washington, D.C., residence (left) of David J. Foster

Foster was born in Barnet, Vermont, a son of Jacob Prentiss Foster and Matilda (Cahoon) Foster. He attended the public schools in Barnet and graduated from St. Johnsbury Academy in 1876 and Dartmouth College in Hanover, New Hampshire, in 1880.

He studied law and was admitted to the bar in 1883. He began the practice of law in Burlington, Vermont. Foster served as Chittenden County State's Attorney from 1886 until 1890. He served as a member of the Vermont State Senate from 1892 until 1894. Foster was the first president of the Young Men's Republican Club of Vermont, which was organized in 1894. He was state tax commissioner from 1894 until 1898.

He served as chairman of the board of railroad commissioners from 1898 until 1900, and as chairman of the commission representing the United States at the first Centennial of the Independence of Mexico at Mexico City in 1910. Foster was the chairman of the United States delegation to the general assembly of the International Institute of Agriculture at Rome in May 1911.

Foster was elected as a Republican candidate to the Fifty-seventh and to the five succeeding Congresses, serving from March 4, 1901, until his death in Washington, D.C., on March 21, 1912. He served as chairman of the Committee on Expenditures in the Department of Commerce and Labor during the Fifty-ninth, Sixtieth and Sixty-first Congresses. He served as the chairman on the Committee on Foreign Affairs in the Sixty-first Congress.

Foster was interred in Lakeview Cemetery in Burlington, Vermont.

== Personal life ==
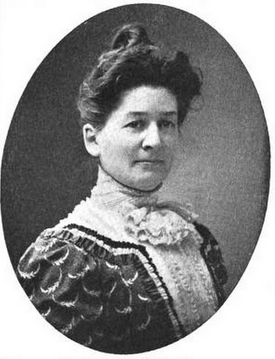
Mabel Allen Foster

Foster married Mabel M. Allen Foster in 1883. They had three children together, Mabel Foster, Mathilde Foster and Mildred Foster.

== See also ==
- List of members of the United States Congress who died in office (1900–1949)

U.S. House of Representatives
Preceded by H. Henry Powers	Member of the U.S. House of Representatives from Vermont's 1st congressional district March 4, 1901 – March 21, 1912	Succeeded by Frank L. Greene
