= Vernon A. Bullard =

American politician (1858–1928)

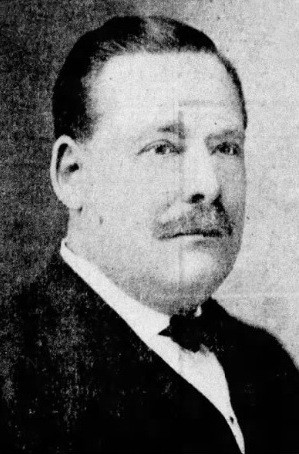
- The Milton Rays (Milton, Vermont), July 5, 1906

United States Attorney for the District of Vermont
- In office 1915–1923
- President: Woodrow Wilson; Warren Harding
- Preceded by: Alexander Dunnett
- Succeeded by: Harry B. Amey

Member of the Vermont House of Representatives from Burlington
- In office 1904–1905
- Preceded by: Walter S. Vincent
- Succeeded by: Claude Dewing Graton

Member of the Vermont House of Representatives from Underhill
- In office 1890–1891
- Preceded by: George W. Woodworth
- Succeeded by: George E. Terrill

Personal details
- Born: October 14, 1858 Hyde Park, Vermont
- Died: September 8, 1928 (aged 69) Burlington, Vermont
- Resting place: Riverbank Cemetery, Stowe, Vermont
- Party: Democratic
- Spouse(s): Fluella R. Stowe; Anniebel Stowe
- Children: 2
- Education: Vermont Normal School; University of Michigan Law School
- Profession: Attorney

Vernon A. Bullard (October 14, 1858 – September 8, 1928) was a Vermont attorney and public official. He served as United States Attorney for the District of Vermont from 1915 to 1923.

Bullard was a native of Hyde Park, Vermont, and taught school while completing his education at Vermont Normal School and the University of Michigan Law School. He practiced law beginning in 1884, first in Underhill and later in Burlington.

A Democrat, Bullard served terms in the Vermont House of Representatives, and ran unsuccessfully for offices including Vermont Attorney General. From 1915 to 1923, Bullard served as Vermont's U.S. Attorney.

Bullard died in Burlington and was buried at Riverbank Cemetery, Stowe, Vermont.

== Early life ==
Vernon Alvord Bullard was born in Hyde Park, Vermont on October 14, 1858, the eldest son of Edwin and Olive (Harrington) Bullard. He was educated in Hyde Park, and began to teach school in 1878. While teaching, Bullard attended the Vermont Normal School, from which he graduated in 1880.

Bullard continued to teach while taking courses at the University of Michigan Law School, from which he received his LL.B. in 1884. He was admitted to the bar later that year and commenced practice in Underhill.

== Early career ==
After practicing in Underhill for ten years, Bullard relocated to Burlington, where he continued to practice. Bullard successfully handled several prominent criminal trials and earned a reputation as a skilled lawyer in civil cases, winning several judgments for medical malpractice.

Bullard was active in politics as a Democrat during an era when Republicans won all statewide elections in Vermont and most local and county elections as well. Despite his party affiliation, he was well-enough regarded that he was elected to represent Underhill in the Vermont House of Representatives from 1890 to 1891, and served for many years as moderator of the Underhill town meeting and a Justice of the Peace. From 1892 to 1896, Bullard was a special inspector of customs for the United States Department of the Treasury.

== Continued career ==
For several years, Bullard was chairman of the Chittenden County Democratic Committee, and he served as a delegate to numerous state party conventions. He was also an unsuccessful candidate for Member of Congress from Vermont's 1st District (1894) and Chittenden County State's Attorney.

Bullard represented Burlington in the Vermont House from 1904 to 1905, and was credited with securing the appropriation that made possible the construction of Morrill Hall at the University of Vermont. He was a delegate to the 1904 Democratic National Convention, and in 1906 he was the unsuccessful Democratic nominee for Vermont Attorney General. Bullard served as Burlington's city attorney for several years, and from 1905 to 1913 he was a member of the city school board, including serving as chairman from 1909 to 1913. In 1908, he was the Democratic nominee for United States Senator against incumbent Republican William P. Dillingham, and the Vermont General Assembly chose Dillingham by a vote of 230 to 38.

== United States Attorney ==
In 1915, Bullard was appointed United States Attorney for the District of Vermont, succeeding Alexander Dunnett. He served until 1923, and was succeeded by Harry B. Amey.

During Bullard's tenure, crimes that fell under federal jurisdiction were on the rise as the result of societal changes including increased urbanization, as well an increase in illegal activities connected to criminalizing the sale of opiates and cocaine, World War I, and passage of Prohibition in the United States. As a result, Bullard's office handled as many as four times the cases of his predecessors, including draft evaders, drug dealers, and bootleggers.

== Death and burial ==
Bullard died in Burlington on September 8, 1928. He was buried in plot 5G-31 at Riverbank Cemetery in Stowe, Vermont.

== Family ==
In 1885, Bullard married Fluella R. Stowe (1858–1894) of Morrisville. She died in 1894, and they were the parents of two children, son Haven Stowe and daughter Augusta Ruth, the wife of Earle Benjamin of Plymouth, New Hampshire. His second wife was Anniebel Stowe (1865–1925), a sister of his first wife.

== Sources ==
=== Books ===
- Carleton, Hiram (1903). Genealogical and Family History of the State of Vermont. Vol. 1. New York, NY: Lewis Publishing Company. ISBN 9780806347943.

=== Newspapers ===
- "The Legislature: A Summary of the Principal Business Done During the Past Week". Middlebury Register. Middlebury, VT. October 19, 1894 – via Newspapers.com.
- "The City's Water Supply: V. A. Bullard". Burlington Free Press. Burlington, VT. November 3, 1906 – via Newspapers.com.
- "Page and Dillingham Named to Represent Vermont in the United States Senate". The Enterprise and Vermonter. Vergennes, Vermont. October 22, 1908 – via Newspapers.com.
- "H. B. Amey Is Now District Attorney". Burlington Free Press. Burlington, VT. July 2, 1923 – via Newspapers.com.
- "Obituary, Vernon A. Bullard". Burlington Free Press. Burlington, VT. September 10, 1928 – via Newspapers.com.

=== Internet ===
- Boyko, Janice (2014). "Riverbank Cemetery, Stowe, Lamoille County, Vermont". nekg-vt.com. Simsbury, CT: Northeast Kingdom Genealogy (NEKG).
- Vermont State Archives and Records Administration (2016). "General Election Results: Attorney General, 1906-2016" (PDF). sec.state.vt.us. Vermont Secretary of State. Archived from the original (PDF) on 2018-09-23.

Party political offices
First	Democratic nominee for Vermont Attorney General; 1906	Succeeded by John J. Enright
