= 1940 United States Senate election in Vermont =

- November 5, 1940
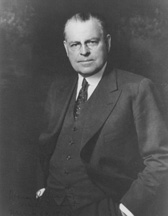

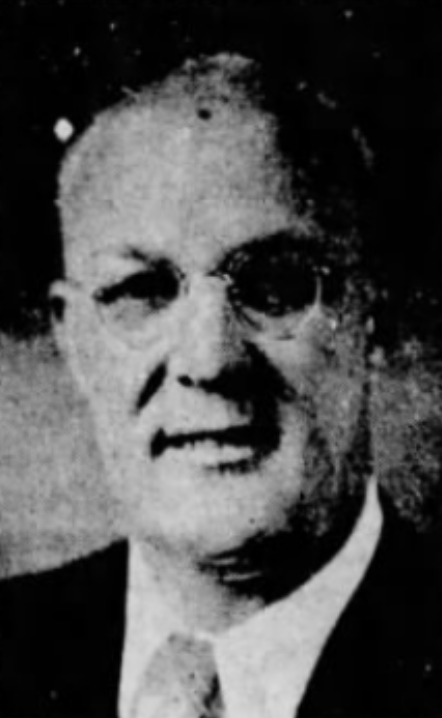
Nominee	Warren Austin	Ona Searles
Party	Republican	Democratic
Popular vote	93,283	47,101
Percentage	66.45%	33.55%
- Austin: 50–60% 60–70% 70–80% 80–90% >90% Searles: 50–60% 60–70% 80–90%
U.S. senator before election
Warren Austin
Republican
Elected U.S. Senator
Warren Austin
Republican

The 1940 United States Senate election in Vermont took place on November 5, 1940. Incumbent Republican Warren Austin successfully ran for re-election to another term in the United States Senate, defeating Democratic candidate Ona S. Searles. Austin would resign in August 1946 to become United States Ambassador to the United Nations; Ralph Flanders was appointed to replace him and went on to win election to a full term in 1946.

== Republican primary ==
=== Candidates ===
- Warren Austin, incumbent Senator since 1931

=== Results ===
1940 Republican Senate primary
Party	Candidate	Votes	%
Republican	Warren Austin (incumbent)	60,603	99.89%
Write-in		65	0.11%
Total votes		60,668	100.00%

== Democratic primary ==
=== Candidates ===
- Ona S. Searles, State Representative from Newport City

=== Results ===
1940 Democratic Senate primary
Party	Candidate	Votes	%
Democratic	Ona S. Searles	5,340	99.39%
Write-in		33	0.61%
Total votes		5,373	100.00%

== General election ==
=== Results ===
United States Senate election in Vermont, 1940
Party	Candidate	Votes	%	±%
Republican	Warren Austin (inc.)	93,283	66.45%	▲15.41
Democratic	Ona S. Searles	47,101	33.55%	▼15.41
Total votes		140,384	100.00%	

== See also ==
- United States Senate elections, 1940 and 1941
