= Fred C. Martin =

Vermont politician and US government official

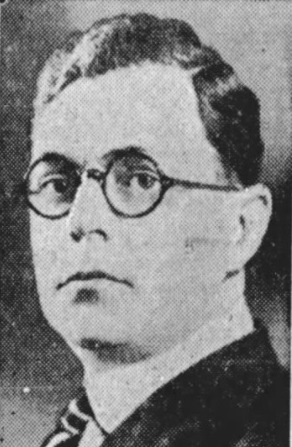
- Martin in 1936

United States Internal Revenue Collector for the District of Vermont
- In office 1 July 1933 – 10 April 1945
- Preceded by: Robert W. McCuen
- Succeeded by: Samuel E. Richardson

Member of the Vermont House of Representatives
- In office 2 October 1912 – 6 January 1915
- Preceded by: Frank E. Howe
- Succeeded by: Arthur E. Hollister
- Constituency: Bennington

Personal details
- Born: Frederick Collins Martin; 9 June 1882 Bennington, Vermont, US
- Died: 10 April 1945 (aged 62) Bennington, Vermont, US
- Resting place: Centre Cemetery, Bennington, Vermont, US
- Party: Democratic
- Spouse: Hildred Hannah Burnham (m. 1939–1945)
- Occupation: Businessman

Fred C. Martin (9 June 1882 – 10 April 1945) was a Vermont businessman, politician, and government official. A Democrat during the period when Republicans won every statewide election in Vermont, Martin was the party's nominee on several occasions for governor and US senator. He served in the Vermont House of Representatives from 1912 to 1915 and was Vermont's US internal revenue collector from 1933 until his death.

A native and lifelong resident of Bennington, Vermont, Martin was educated in Bennington and was a longtime employee of the Holden-Leonard Company, Bennington-based manufacturers of wool goods. Beginning as an office boy after high school, Martin worked his way through the company's ranks to become its office manager. He was also involved in other business enterprises, including service on the board of directors for two Bennington-area banks. Long involved in local government and civic causes, he was the longtime secretary of the Bennington library board and served as village president from 1909 to 1912 and 1922 to 1935. From 1912 to 1915, Martin represented Bennington in the Vermont House.

Martin was a delegate to numerous Democratic national conventions and was the party's nominee for governor in 1920, 1924, and 1938 and US senator in 1928, 1932, and 1934. In 1933, Martin was appointed US internal revenue collector for Vermont, and he served in this position until his death. Martin died in Bennington on 10 April 1945 and was buried at Bennington Centre Cemetery.

== Early life ==
Fred C. Martin was born in Bennington, Vermont on 9 June 1882, a son of William Martin and Georgianna (Collins) Martin. He was raised and educated in Bennington and graduated from Bennington's high school in 1900. After high school, he joined Bennington's Holden-Leonard Company, makers of woolen goods, as an office boy. Company executives recognized his talents for management and administration, and by 1912 he had advanced to office manager. Martin was also a director of Bennington's County National Bank and the Bennington Cooperative Savings and Loan Association. Martin was eventually appointed executive vice president of County National, then its president. He was also a longtime board member for Bennington's library, and was the board's secretary for over 20 years.

A Democrat in politics during the 100-plus years when Republicans won every statewide election, Bennington's voters chose Martin for local office despite his party affiliation; he served as village president from 1909 to 1912 and again from 1922 to 1935. Martin's civic and fraternal affiliations included Freemasonry; he was a member of Bennington's Mount Anthony lodge for most of his life. In addition, he served as high priest of Bennington's Temple Chapter of the Royal Arch Masons, a member of the Knights Templar, and the Cairo Temple of the Shriners. Martin also belonged to the Bennington Country Club, the Elks, and the Bennington Club. He was also a trustee of Green Mountain Junior College in Poultney.

== Continued career ==
In 1912, Martin was elected to represent Bennington in the Vermont House of Representatives; during his term the beginning end ending dates for state offices was changed from October to January, so Martin's two-year term was extended from October 1914 to January 1915. He was a delegate to the Democratic national conventions of 1912, 1920, 1924, 1928, 1932, and 1936. During the protracted nomination battle for president in 1924, Martin made headlines when he received one Vermont delegate's vote for president on the 29th ballot. Martin was the Democratic nominee for governor in 1920, 1924, and 1938. In 1928, 1932 and 1934, he received the Democratic nomination for US senator.

When Democrat Franklin D. Roosevelt was elected president in 1932, Martin received his appointment as Vermont's US Internal Revenue Collector. He continued to receive successive reappointments during Roosevelt's administration and served in this position from July 1933 until his death. He died in Bennington on 10 April 1945 and was buried at Centre Cemetery in Bennington.
