= 1938 Vermont gubernatorial election =

- November 8, 1938
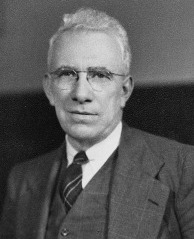

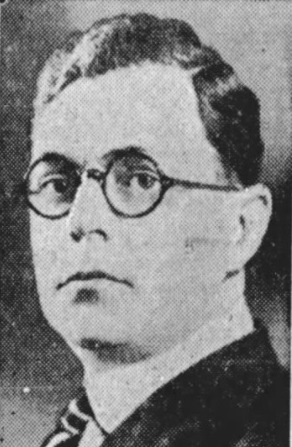
Nominee	George Aiken	Fred C. Martin
Party	Republican	Democratic
Popular vote	75,098	37,404
Percentage	66.75%	33.25%
- Aiken: 50–60% 60–70% 70–80% 80–90% 90-100% Martin: 50–60% 60–70% 70–80% 90–100% Tie: 50% No Vote/Data
Governor before election
George Aiken
Republican
Elected Governor
George Aiken
Republican

The 1938 Vermont gubernatorial election took place on November 8, 1938. Incumbent Republican George Aiken ran successfully for re-election to a second term as Governor of Vermont, defeating Democratic candidate Fred C. Martin.

== Republican primary ==
=== Results ===
Republican primary results
Party	Candidate	Votes	%	±%
Republican	George Aiken (inc.)	42,953	89.3	
Republican	Elisha N. Goodsell	5,121	10.7	
Republican	Others	3	0.0	
Total votes		48,077	100.0	

== Democratic primary ==
=== Results ===
Democratic primary results
Party	Candidate	Votes	%	±%
Democratic	Fred C. Martin	4,978	99.7	
Democratic	Other	16	0.3	
Total votes		4,994	100.0	

== General election ==
=== Results ===
1938 Vermont gubernatorial election
Party	Candidate	Votes	%	±%
Republican	George Aiken (inc.)	75,098	66.75	
Democratic	Fred C. Martin	37,404	33.25	
Total votes		112,502	100.0	
