= Frank L. Greene =

American politician

Frank Lester Greene
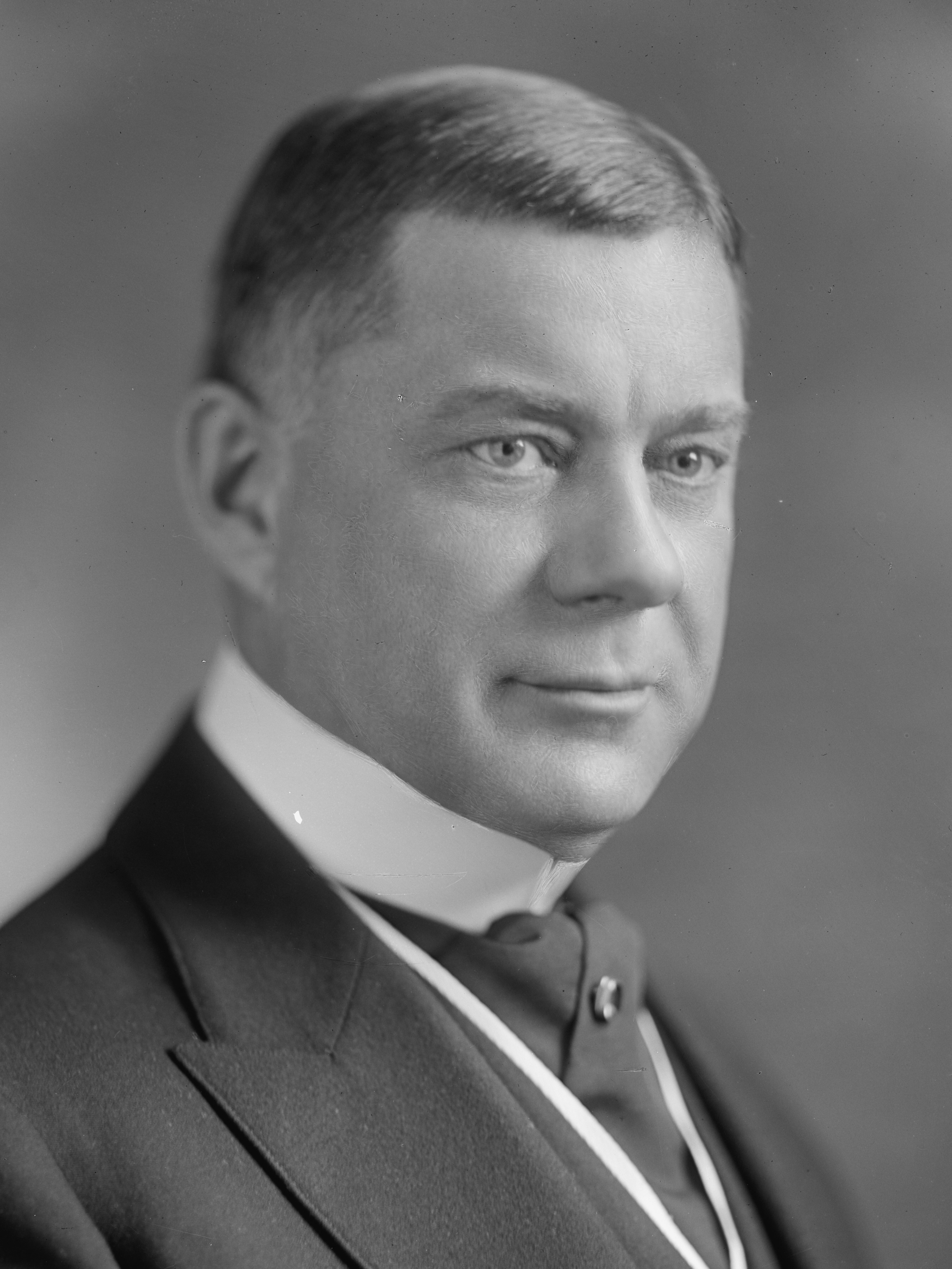

United States Senator from Vermont
- In office March 4, 1923 – December 17, 1930
- Preceded by: Carroll S. Page
- Succeeded by: Frank C. Partridge

Member of the U.S. House of Representatives from Vermont's 1st district
- In office July 30, 1912 – March 3, 1923
- Preceded by: David J. Foster
- Succeeded by: Frederick G. Fleetwood

Personal details
- Born: February 10, 1870 St. Albans, Vermont
- Died: December 17, 1930 (aged 60) St. Albans, Vermont
- Resting place: Greenwood Cemetery, St. Albans, Vermont
- Party: Republican
- Spouse: Jessie Emma Richardson (m. 1895-1930, his death)
- Children: 3
- Occupation: Newspaper editor Militia officer Legislator

Military service
- Allegiance: United States
- Branch/service: Vermont Militia; United States Army
- Years of service: 1888–1900 (Militia); 1898 (United States Army)
- Rank: Colonel
- Unit: Vermont Militia; 3rd Brigade, First Division, Third Army Corps
- Battles/wars: Spanish–American War

Frank Lester Greene (February 10, 1870 – December 17, 1930) was a Vermont newspaper editor and militia officer. He is most notable for his service as a United States representative and senator.

A native of St. Albans, Vermont, he was educated in St. Albans and Cleveland, Ohio, and began working as a teenager to help support his family after his father became disabled. He became a clerk for the Central Vermont Railway, and later became a journalist and editor of the St. Albans Messenger newspaper. Greene also served in the militia; enlisting as a private, by the time of the Spanish–American War he was a company commander with the rank of captain. He later served on the military staff of Governor Edward Curtis Smith, with the rank of colonel; Smith had been his employer at the Central Vermont Railway and St. Albans Messenger.

Long active in politics and government as a Republican, in 1912 he won a special election to complete the term of Congressman David J. Foster, who had died. He was reelected to a full term in November 1912, and won reelection to four more terms. In 1922, Greene was elected to the United States Senate. He was reelected in 1928, and served until his death. In 1924, Greene was wounded when Prohibition agents attempting to apprehend the owners of a Washington, D.C., moonshine still accidentally shot him in the head. Greene never fully recovered, and was left partly paralyzed. He died as the result of surgical complications while being treated for a hernia, and was buried in St. Albans.

== Early life ==
Frank Greene was born in St. Albans, Vermont, on February 10, 1870, the son of Lester Bruce Greene and Mary Elizabeth (Hoadley) Greene. He attended the public schools in St. Albans and Cleveland, Ohio. The Greene family had relocated to Cleveland because Lester Greene had become Secretary/Treasurer of the Brotherhood of Locomotive Engineers. When Frank Greene was 13 his father became ill and could no longer work. The family returned to Vermont and Frank quit school to help support his family by taking a job as a messenger with the Central Vermont Railway. He remained with the railroad until 1891, learning shorthand and stenography and advancing to the position of chief clerk in the general freight department. Having worked part-time as a correspondent for The Boston Globe and other newspapers beginning in 1888, in 1891 Greene made journalism his full-time career, first as a reporter for and later as editor of the St. Albans Messenger. He was president of the Vermont Press Association from 1904 to 1905.

== Military service ==
Greene served in the Vermont National Guard from 1888 to 1900. Enlisting as a private, during the Spanish–American War he commanded an infantry company as a captain. Greene later served as adjutant of 3rd Brigade, First Division, Third Army Corps, with duty at Camp Thomas, Georgia and Anniston, Alabama. After the war Greene was commissioned a colonel on the staff of Edward Curtis Smith, the Governor of Vermont, and Greene's former employer on the Central Vermont Railroad and the St. Albans Messenger.

== Beginning of political career ==
A Republican, Greene was Chairman of Vermont's Young Men's Republican Club in the 1890s. He was Chairman of the St. Albans Republican Committee, and a Delegate to several county and state conventions. He was an Alternate to the 1904 Republican National Convention and a Delegate to the one in 1908.

In 1906 Greene was appointed to head a commission that examined the state normal schools, and in 1908 he was a member of the commission that proposed amendments to the Vermont Constitution.

== Congressional career ==
Greene was elected as a Republican to the House of Representatives during the 62nd Congress to fill the vacancy caused by the death of David J. Foster. He was reelected every two years from 1912 to 1920, and served from July 30, 1912, to March 3, 1923. In 1914 he was chairman of the Vermont State Republican Convention. He was a Regent of the Smithsonian Institution from 1917 to 1923.

In 1922 Greene was elected to the U.S. Senate. While in the Senate, he was Chairman of the Committee on Enrolled Bills (69th through the portion of the 71st Congresses as preceded his death in 1930). Greene was reelected in 1928 and served from March 4, 1923, until his death.

== Gunshot wound ==
On the evening of February 15, 1924, Greene was walking with his wife near an alley on Capitol Hill when Prohibition agents were about to arrest several men unloading a still from their car. The bootleggers ran, the agents fired their guns, and Greene was struck in the head by a stray bullet. Greene was in critical condition for several weeks, and never fully recovered. His right arm was paralyzed, and his legs were severely weakened.

== Death and burial ==
Greene died in St. Albans on December 17, 1930, from complications during surgery for a hernia. He was interred at Greenwood Cemetery in St. Albans.

== Civic and fraternal memberships ==
Greene was a member of several veterans organizations, including the Sons of Union Veterans of the Civil War, Military Order of Foreign Wars, and United Spanish War Veterans. He was also a member of several civic and fraternal organizations, including the Vermont Historical Society, Masons, Knights Templar, Shriners, Elks, Grange, Owls, National Press Club and Army and Navy Club.

== Honors ==
Greene received an honorary Master of Arts degree from Norwich University in 1908. He received an honorary LL.D. from Norwich in 1915.

== Family ==
In 1895 Greene married Jessie Emma Richardson (1873–1949). They were the parents of three children: Richardson Lester Greene (March 27, 1896 – May 28, 1980); Dorothy Greene Alexander (November 18, 1897 – December 5, 1991); and Stuart Hoadley Greene (December 2, 1901 – December 15, 1973).

== See also ==
- List of members of the United States Congress who died in office (1900–1949)

Party political offices
Preceded by Carroll S. Page	Republican nominee for U.S. Senator from Vermont (Class 1); 1922, 1928	Succeeded by Warren Austin
U.S. House of Representatives
Preceded by David J. Foster	Member of the U.S. House of Representatives from Vermont's 1st congressional district 1912 – 1923	Succeeded by Frederick G. Fleetwood
U.S. Senate
Preceded by Carroll S. Page	U.S. senator (Class 1) from Vermont; 1923 – 1930; Served alongside: William P. Dillingham, Porter H. Dale	Succeeded by Frank C. Partridge
