= Order of Owls =

American secret fraternal order

The Order of Owls is a secret fraternal order founded in 1904 in South Bend, Indiana, USA, by John W. Talbot. According to its literature, the purposes of the society is "to assist each other in business, to help each other in obtaining employment, to assist the widows and orphans of our brothers, to give aid to our brother in any way that they may need, and assemble for mutual pleasure and entertainment." Its "catechism" said "Owls do good, speak kindly, shake hands warmly, and respect and honor their women."

== History ==
The order originated among a group of men who engaged in different businesses and periodically met for mutual assistance. This group included John W. Talbot, Joseph E. Talbot, George D. Beroth, J. Lott Losey, John J. Johnson, John D. Burke, William Weaver and Frank Dunbar. They got around to discussing the teachings and methods of different fraternal orders and decided to create a new one, named after the owl. After several months of planning by "the best constitutional lawyers in the Middle West," the constitution was adopted and the order was founded at the law offices of Talbot and Talbot on Nov. 20, 1904, in South Bend, Indiana.

== Organization ==
The local units of the Order are called "Nests" and include officers such an "Invocator" who served as chaplain. The central organization was evidently the "Home Nest" in the early twentieth century, but it was reportedly called the "Supreme Nest" in 1979. The head of the organization was the Supreme President.

The headquarters are called the "Supreme Offices" as late as the 1920s, but had moved to Hartford, Connecticut by the 1930s.

== Membership ==
Membership was open to men regardless of their religion. At least as late as 1979, though, membership was limited to white males.

In 1911 the Order claimed over 300,000 members in the US, Canada, Mexico, Cuba, Puerto Rico, Australia, South Africa and elsewhere. In 1924 the Order had 643,748 members in 2,148 lodges. It had approximately 100,000 members and 1,500 Nests in 1951, In 1957 the Order claimed a membership of 202,000. In 1970 it had 40,000 members and 5,000 in 1989.

== Ritual ==
The Order of Owls worked four degrees and had a secret ritual, signs, grips and passwords. The initiate was required to recite a lengthy obligation, before he could join the order. An Owls circular in the early 1920s stated that "We have a beautiful ritual, but no religious observances. Nothing in the ritual is offensive to any man's religion or irreligion."

In 1912, it was reported that the Owls' motto, penned by Frank Dunbar at the initial 1904 meeting, was:

There's so much bad in the best of us
And so much good in the worst of us
It hardly behooves any of us
To speak ill of the rest of us.

The same article goes on to state:

The Owls in their mottoes have gone the Hoo-Hoos one better in the rescue of a good old but sadly abused Latin derivative. Out of deference to non-members we will use the customary dash in the one quoted, which is offered in evidence of fact that the Owls, while going about in a serious way to sandpaper the splinters of the helter-skelter of life, are firm believers in the play spirit. The motto is DON'T TAKE YOURSELVES TOO — SERIOUSLY.

== Religious controversies ==
The ritual of the Order of the Owls stated, "We advocate no creed. We know there are so many gods, so many creeds, so many paths that wind and wind. We believe that the art of kindness is all this old world needs." They elsewhere stated that their Order was "a secret society of good fellows, who believe in love, laughter and the Kingdom of Heaven ON EARTH. It does not believe in postponing ones enjoyments until after death" Other Owls literature stated claimed they were "the only great secret fraternity which does not claim in any manner to be a religious body."

After being attacked by the Catholic weekly Newark Monitor in 1907, Supreme President Talbot replied that the order was founded by "sober men of Catholic education" and reported that 4 of its supreme officers were Catholics, 2 others were married to Catholics in the church and four out of seven of the trustees were Catholics. Furthermore, he claimed that the Owls was the only secret order in which there was nothing objectionable to Catholics other than the Ancient Order of Hibernians which Talbot claimed he had joined twenty years prior.

Later, when a Catholic pastor had warned his congregation against the Owls, Talbot wrote him back on Dec. 13, 1910 saying that it had come to his attention that he had a copy of the ritual and was making parts of it known; Talbot protested that the ritual was property of the Home Nest, which was the supreme organization of the order, and "amply protected in a legal manner" and threatened legal action, but nothing came of the matter. p. 358-9

The Order of Owls refused to respond from inquires from the Lutheran Church–Missouri Synod's Commission on Fraternal Orders in 1947, 1957, 1960, or 1961.

== Afro-American Order of Owls ==
A group called the "Afro-American Order of Owls" was founded in Maryland in 1911. They were sued by the Order of the Owls over the use of the name. In 1914 the Maryland Court of Appeals issued a split decision allowing the Afro-American Order of Owls to continue using the name, but not the initials "A.A.O.O.O." symbol, as it was too close to the white organizations "O.O.O." symbol.

== More controversy and splits ==
On August 9, 1912, the Grand Rapids "Local Nest" seceded to form the Order of Ancient Oaks, saying, "The Order of Owls is governed by one John W. Talbot and four associates, at South Bend, Ind. who run things to suit themselves and give no account of the moneys received. The Order has no legal standing anywhere in the U.S. and is careless in admitting new members." This had all come out in an investigation by the Grand Rapids Nest and several other dissatisfied Nests. According to the Grand Rapids Herald the Owls had suffered no less than 40 secessions, the revolters taking various names. On May 27, 1921, the St. Louis Post-Dispatch reported that 200 members had left the Order of the Owls to form the Supreme Order of the White Rabbits. Lodges of the White Rabbits were located in Missouri, Kansas, Illinois and Ohio.

A Loyal American League was founded circa 1912 in Des Moines, Iowa by William. B. Jarvis, a former organizer of the Owls to "combat Puritan intolerance." The group didn't seem to last long.

In 1921, Supreme President John W. Talbot was convicted under the Mann Act. He was sentenced to five years in Leavenworth Federal Penitentiary and a $5,000 fine. This was his second offense.

Some supposed Nests operated into the early 21st century in such places as Duluth, Minnesota, Perkasie, Pennsylvania and Parkersburg, West Virginia. One alleged Nest in Baltimore, Maryland was raided in 2005 as "an illegal poker tournament." Duluth's "Owls Club" continues to exist as an independent continuation of the Order of Owls.
