= Frank C. Partridge =

American politician (1861–1943)

Frank Charles Partridge
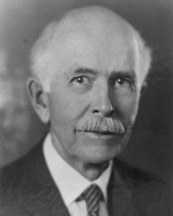

United States Senator from Vermont
- In office December 23, 1930 – March 31, 1931
- Appointed by: John E. Weeks
- Preceded by: Frank L. Greene
- Succeeded by: Warren Austin

Member of the Vermont Senate from Rutland County
- In office 1898–1900 Serving with Frederick S. Platt; Silas L. Griffith; Jesse E. Thomson
- Preceded by: Frederick H. Farrington; Hiram L. Manchester; George T. Chaffee; Rodney M. Lewis
- Succeeded by: James H. Aiken; Philip R. Leavenworth; Percival W. Clement; Elwin O. Aldrich

U.S. Consul in Tangier, Morocco
- In office 1897–1898
- Preceded by: David N. Burke
- Succeeded by: Samuel R. Gummere

United States Minister to Venezuela
- In office March 4, 1893 – January 9, 1894
- Preceded by: William L. Scruggs
- Succeeded by: Seneca Haselton

Personal details
- Born: May 7, 1861 East Middlebury, Vermont, U.S.
- Died: March 2, 1943 (aged 81) Proctor, Vermont, U.S.
- Resting place: South Street Cemetery, Proctor, Vermont
- Party: Republican
- Spouse: Sarah Sanborn (m. May 7, 1907)
- Children: 5
- Education: Amherst College; Columbia Law School
- Profession: Lawyer; Business executive

Frank C. Partridge (May 7, 1861 – March 2, 1943) was an American attorney, diplomat, and business executive from Vermont. A Republican, he served briefly in the United States Senate, appointed to fill the vacancy left by the death of Frank L. Greene.

A native of East Middlebury, Vermont, Partridge was educated in Middlebury, attended Middlebury College, and graduated from Amherst College (1882) and Columbia Law School (1884). Partridge practiced law in Rutland before becoming active in the Vermont Marble Company and associated politically with the company's owners, the Redfield Proctor family. Partridge advanced up Vermont Marble's ranks beginning in the mid-1880s, and served successively as treasurer, vice president, president, and chairman of the board. In addition, he was affiliated with other Proctor businesses, including the Proctor Trust Company and the Clarendon and Pittsford Railroad.

Partridge held local offices in Proctor, including town clerk and school board member. When Redfield Proctor served as Secretary of War from 1889 to 1890, Partridge served as his private secretary. Partridge's connection to a powerful cabinet member who later served in the U.S. Senate led to several appointments, including Solicitor of the Department of State from 1890 to 1893, United States Ambassador to Venezuela from 1893 to 1894, and U.S. Consul in Tangier, Morocco from 1897 to 1898. From 1898 to 1900, Partridge served in the Vermont Senate.

As a prominent business leader and former diplomat, Partridge developed "senior statesman" status that led to service on various boards and commissions, in the 1910s and 1920s, including the state public safety committee that managed Vermont's participation in World War I and the public corporation that aided in Vermont's recovery following the Great Flood of 1927. In December 1930, Governor John E. Weeks appointed Partridge to the U.S. Senate to fill the vacancy created by the death of Frank Greene. Partridge lost the Republican nomination to Warren Austin in the March 1931 primary, and in overwhelmingly Republican Vermont, Austin easily defeated Democrat Stephen M. Driscoll in the general election. Partridge retired in 1935, and resided in Proctor. He died there on March 2, 1943, and was interred at South Street Cemetery in Proctor.

== Early life and start of career ==
Frank Charles Partridge was born in East Middlebury, Vermont on May 7, 1861, the son of Charles Frank Partridge and Sarah Ann (Rice) Partridge. He graduated from Middlebury High School in 1878, and as a teenager worked as a messenger for Redfield Proctor during Proctor's term as Governor of Vermont. He attended Middlebury College, graduated from Amherst College in 1882 (with classmate Fletcher Dutton Proctor), and received his law degree from Columbia Law School in 1884.

Partridge worked as a lawyer in Rutland and then began a career with the Vermont Marble Company in Proctor, Vermont. Vermont Marble was owned by Redfield Proctor, and Partridge's decision to join Vermont Marble continued his lifelong association with the Proctor family. He served as Vermont Marble's treasurer (1886); vice president (1891); and president (1912) and chairman of the board of directors.

He was also president of the Proctor Trust Company and the Clarendon and Pittsford Railroad, as well as a member of National Life Insurance Company's board of directors.

Partridge was a trustee of Middlebury College, and received an honorary LL.D. degree from Middlebury in 1909.

== Political career ==
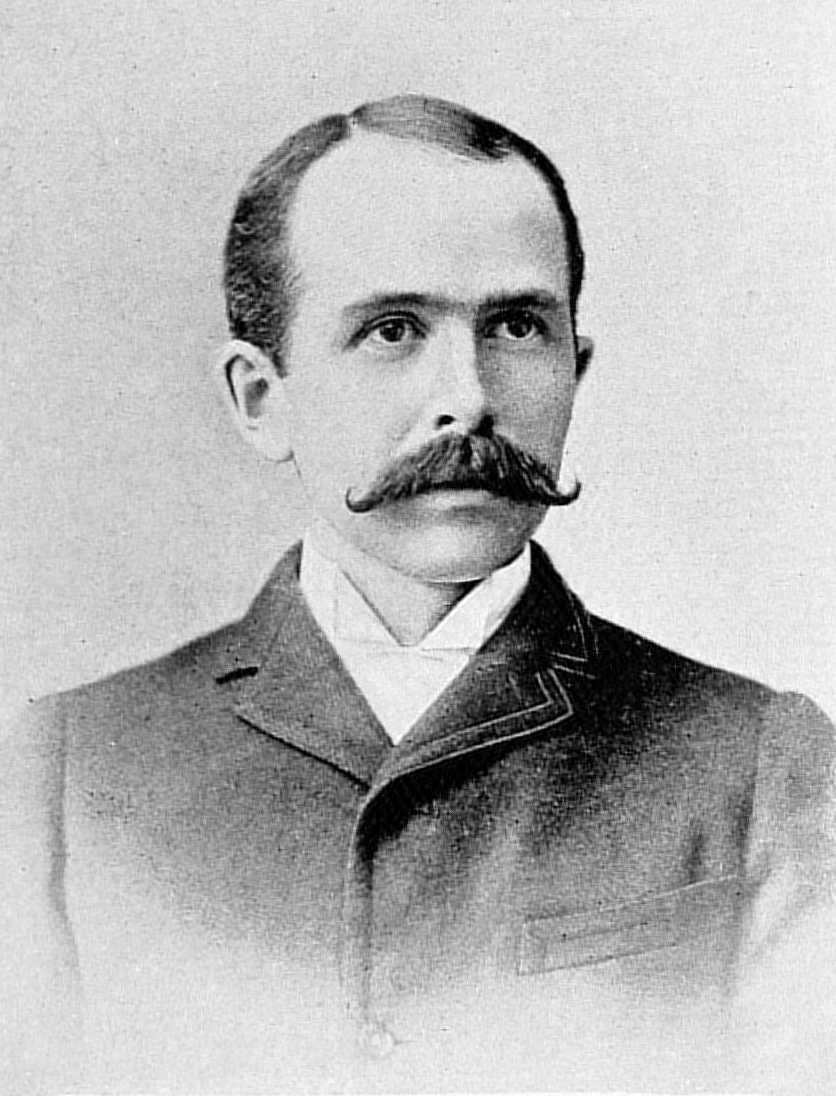
Frank C. Partridge in 1894

A Republican, he held several positions in local, state and national government, including: Proctor Town Clerk (1887–1889); school board member (1888–1889); Private Secretary to Secretary of War Redfield Proctor (1889–1890); Solicitor of the Department of State (1890–1893); United States Ambassador to Venezuela (1893–1894); U.S. Consul in Tangier, Morocco (1897–1898); Vermont State Senator (1898–1900); Member of Vermont's World War I Committee of Public Safety (1917–1919); member of the American Society of International Law's executive council (1906–1923); chairman of the commission to propose amendments to the Constitution of Vermont (1909); delegate to the Fifth Pan-American Conference in Santiago, Chile (1923); member of the New England Council (1925–1927); and president of the Vermont Flood Credit Corporation (following the Flood of 1927).

== United States Senator ==
In December, 1930 Partridge was appointed by Governor John E. Weeks to fill the Senate vacancy caused by the death of Frank L. Greene. Partridge ran unsuccessfully for the Republican nomination in the special election to finish Greene's term, losing to Warren R. Austin, who won the general election and succeeded Partridge. Partridge served in the Senate from December 23, 1930, to March 31, 1931, and during his brief term he was chairman of the Senate's Committee on Enrolled Bills.

== Retirement and death ==
Partridge retired from Vermont Marble in 1935, and died in Proctor on March 2, 1943. He was interred at South Street Cemetery in Proctor.

== Family ==
In 1907, Partridge married Sarah L. Sanborn of Illinois. They were the parents of five children—Frances Partridge Coulter (1909–2007), Charles F. (1911–2001), Sanborn (1915–2013), Ruth (1917–2022), and David (b. 1925–2025).

=== Rice family and relations ===
Partridge was a descendant of Edmund Rice, an English immigrant to Massachusetts Bay Colony, as follows:

- Frank Charles Partridge, son of
  - Sarah Ann Rice (1835 – 1919), daughter of

  - Luther Rice (1799 – 1876), son of
  - Eliakim Rice (1756 – 1834), son of
  - Zebulon Rice (1725 – 1799), son of

      - Elisha Rice (1679 – 1761), son of
      - Thomas Rice (1626 – 1681), son of

      - Edmund Rice (1594 – 1663)

U.S. Senate
Preceded by Frank L. Greene	U.S. senator (Class 1) from Vermont; December 23, 1930–March 31, 1931; Served alongside: Porter H. Dale	Succeeded by Warren Austin
Diplomatic posts
Preceded by William L. Scruggs	United States Minister to Venezuela; March 4, 1893 – January 9, 1894	Succeeded by Seneca Haselton
