= List of United States senators from Arizona =

Current delegation

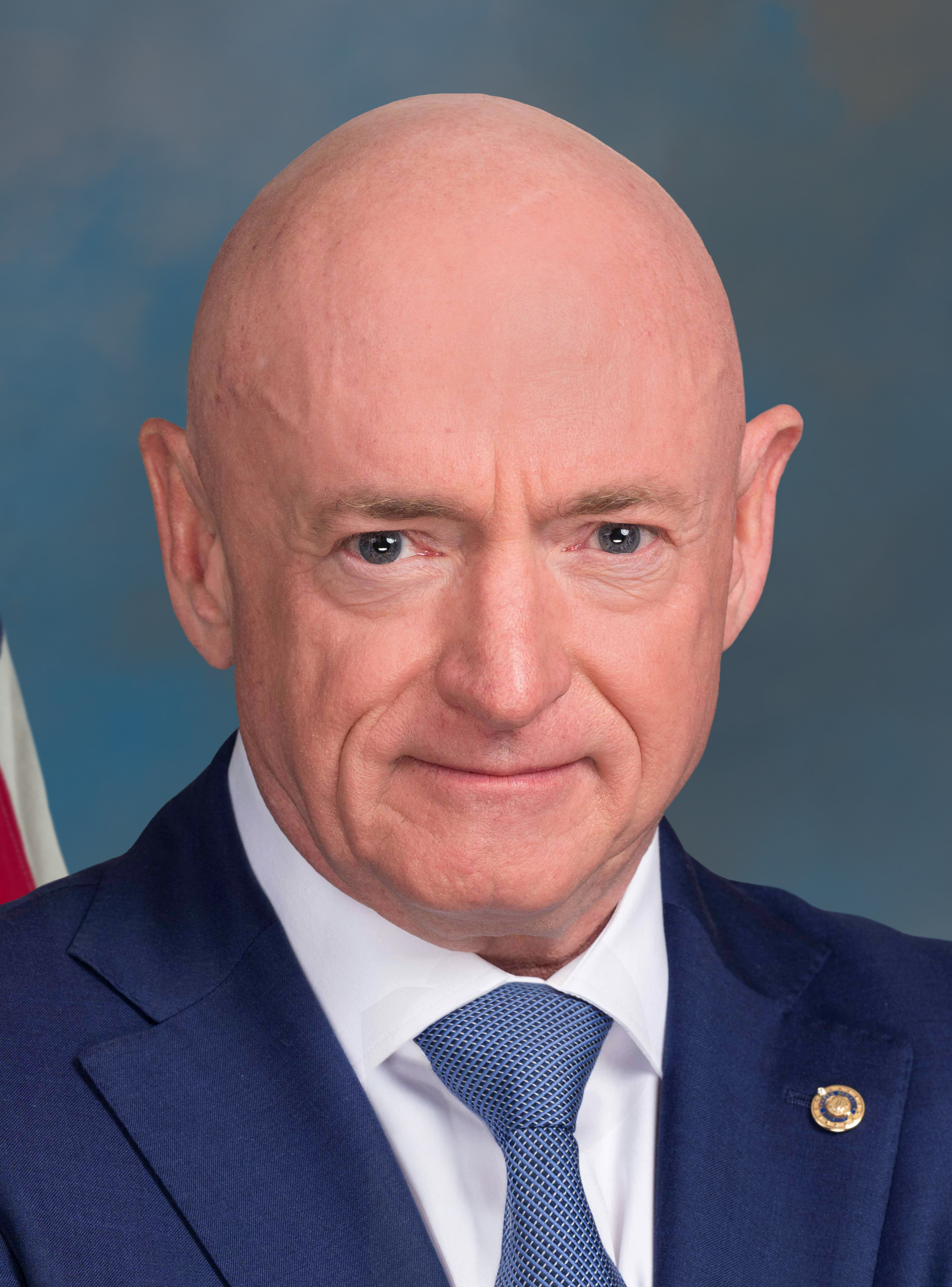
Mark Kelly (D)

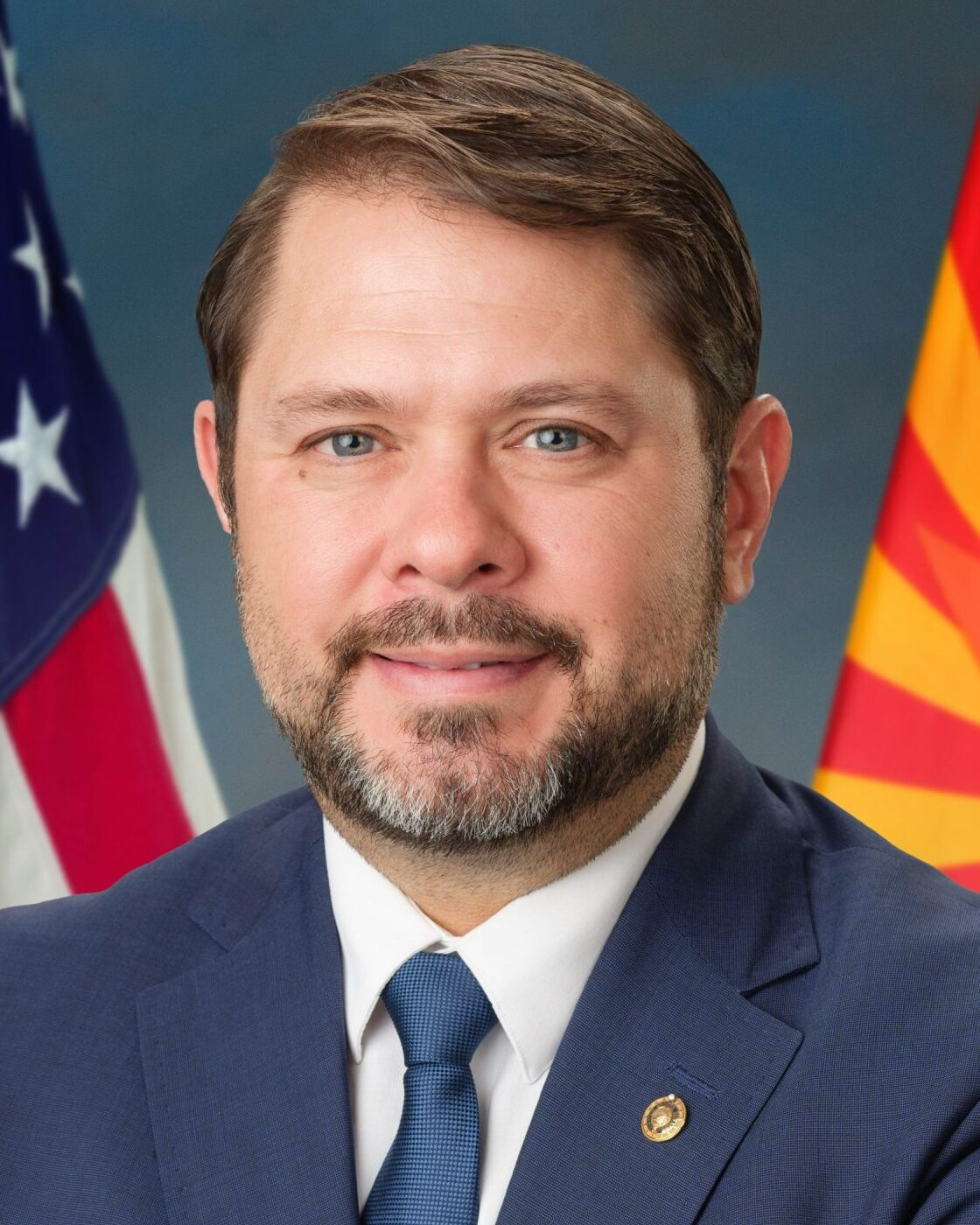
Ruben Gallego (D)

(ordered by seniority)

Arizona was admitted to the Union on February 14, 1912. U.S. senators from Arizona belong to class 1 and class 3 and are popularly elected for a six-year term beginning January 3. Elections are held the first Tuesday after the first Monday in November. The state's current U.S. senators are Democrats Mark Kelly, serving since 2020, and Ruben Gallego, serving since 2025. Carl Hayden was the longest serving senator, having served from 1927 to 1969. In total, only 15 individuals have ever served as a Senator from Arizona.

== List of senators ==
Class 1 Class 1 senators belong to the electoral cycle that most recently had regular elections in 2006, 2012, 2018, and 2024. The next election will be in 2030.						C	Class 3 Class 3 senators belong to the electoral cycle that most recently had regular elections in 2004, 2010, 2016, and 2022. The next election will be in 2028.					
#	Senator	Party	Dates in office	Electoral history	T	C	T	Electoral history	Dates in office	Party	Senator	#
Vacant			Feb 14, 1912 – Mar 27, 1912	Arizona became a state February 14, 1912, but did not elect its U.S. senators until March 27.	1	62nd	1	Arizona became a state February 14, 1912, but did not elect its U.S. senators until March 27.	Feb 14, 1912 – Mar 27, 1912	Vacant		
1	Henry F. Ashurst (Prescott)	Democratic	Mar 27, 1912 – Jan 3, 1941	Elected in 1912.	1	62nd	1	Elected in 1912.	Mar 27, 1912 – Mar 3, 1921	Democratic	Marcus A. Smith (Tucson)	1
1	Henry F. Ashurst (Prescott)	Democratic	Mar 27, 1912 – Jan 3, 1941	Elected in 1912.	1	63rd	1	Elected in 1912.	Mar 27, 1912 – Mar 3, 1921	Democratic	Marcus A. Smith (Tucson)	1
1	Henry F. Ashurst (Prescott)	Democratic	Mar 27, 1912 – Jan 3, 1941	Elected in 1912.	1	64th	2	Re-elected in 1914. Lost re-election.	Mar 27, 1912 – Mar 3, 1921	Democratic	Marcus A. Smith (Tucson)	1
1	Henry F. Ashurst (Prescott)	Democratic	Mar 27, 1912 – Jan 3, 1941	Re-elected in 1916.	2	65th	2	Re-elected in 1914. Lost re-election.	Mar 27, 1912 – Mar 3, 1921	Democratic	Marcus A. Smith (Tucson)	1
1	Henry F. Ashurst (Prescott)	Democratic	Mar 27, 1912 – Jan 3, 1941	Re-elected in 1916.	2	66th	2	Re-elected in 1914. Lost re-election.	Mar 27, 1912 – Mar 3, 1921	Democratic	Marcus A. Smith (Tucson)	1
1	Henry F. Ashurst (Prescott)	Democratic	Mar 27, 1912 – Jan 3, 1941	Re-elected in 1916.	2	67th	3	Elected in 1920. Lost re-election.	Mar 4, 1921 – Mar 3, 1927	Republican	Ralph H. Cameron (Phoenix)	2
1	Henry F. Ashurst (Prescott)	Democratic	Mar 27, 1912 – Jan 3, 1941	Re-elected in 1922.	3	68th	3	Elected in 1920. Lost re-election.	Mar 4, 1921 – Mar 3, 1927	Republican	Ralph H. Cameron (Phoenix)	2
1	Henry F. Ashurst (Prescott)	Democratic	Mar 27, 1912 – Jan 3, 1941	Re-elected in 1922.	3	69th	3	Elected in 1920. Lost re-election.	Mar 4, 1921 – Mar 3, 1927	Republican	Ralph H. Cameron (Phoenix)	2
1	Henry F. Ashurst (Prescott)	Democratic	Mar 27, 1912 – Jan 3, 1941	Re-elected in 1922.	3	70th	4	Elected in 1926.	Mar 4, 1927 – Jan 3, 1969	Democratic	Carl Hayden (Phoenix)	3
1	Henry F. Ashurst (Prescott)	Democratic	Mar 27, 1912 – Jan 3, 1941	Re-elected in 1928.	4	71st	4	Elected in 1926.	Mar 4, 1927 – Jan 3, 1969	Democratic	Carl Hayden (Phoenix)	3
1	Henry F. Ashurst (Prescott)	Democratic	Mar 27, 1912 – Jan 3, 1941	Re-elected in 1928.	4	72nd	4	Elected in 1926.	Mar 4, 1927 – Jan 3, 1969	Democratic	Carl Hayden (Phoenix)	3
1	Henry F. Ashurst (Prescott)	Democratic	Mar 27, 1912 – Jan 3, 1941	Re-elected in 1928.	4	73rd	5	Re-elected in 1932.	Mar 4, 1927 – Jan 3, 1969	Democratic	Carl Hayden (Phoenix)	3
1	Henry F. Ashurst (Prescott)	Democratic	Mar 27, 1912 – Jan 3, 1941	Re-elected in 1934. Lost renomination.	5	74th	5	Re-elected in 1932.	Mar 4, 1927 – Jan 3, 1969	Democratic	Carl Hayden (Phoenix)	3
1	Henry F. Ashurst (Prescott)	Democratic	Mar 27, 1912 – Jan 3, 1941	Re-elected in 1934. Lost renomination.	5	75th	5	Re-elected in 1932.	Mar 4, 1927 – Jan 3, 1969	Democratic	Carl Hayden (Phoenix)	3
1	Henry F. Ashurst (Prescott)	Democratic	Mar 27, 1912 – Jan 3, 1941	Re-elected in 1934. Lost renomination.	5	76th	6	Re-elected in 1938.	Mar 4, 1927 – Jan 3, 1969	Democratic	Carl Hayden (Phoenix)	3
2	Ernest McFarland (Florence)	Democratic	Jan 3, 1941 – Jan 3, 1953	Elected in 1940.	6	77th	6	Re-elected in 1938.	Mar 4, 1927 – Jan 3, 1969	Democratic	Carl Hayden (Phoenix)	3
2	Ernest McFarland (Florence)	Democratic	Jan 3, 1941 – Jan 3, 1953	Elected in 1940.	6	78th	6	Re-elected in 1938.	Mar 4, 1927 – Jan 3, 1969	Democratic	Carl Hayden (Phoenix)	3
2	Ernest McFarland (Florence)	Democratic	Jan 3, 1941 – Jan 3, 1953	Elected in 1940.	6	79th	7	Re-elected in 1944.	Mar 4, 1927 – Jan 3, 1969	Democratic	Carl Hayden (Phoenix)	3
2	Ernest McFarland (Florence)	Democratic	Jan 3, 1941 – Jan 3, 1953	Re-elected in 1946. Lost re-election.	7	80th	7	Re-elected in 1944.	Mar 4, 1927 – Jan 3, 1969	Democratic	Carl Hayden (Phoenix)	3
2	Ernest McFarland (Florence)	Democratic	Jan 3, 1941 – Jan 3, 1953	Re-elected in 1946. Lost re-election.	7	81st	7	Re-elected in 1944.	Mar 4, 1927 – Jan 3, 1969	Democratic	Carl Hayden (Phoenix)	3
2	Ernest McFarland (Florence)	Democratic	Jan 3, 1941 – Jan 3, 1953	Re-elected in 1946. Lost re-election.	7	82nd	8	Re-elected in 1950.	Mar 4, 1927 – Jan 3, 1969	Democratic	Carl Hayden (Phoenix)	3
3	Barry Goldwater (Phoenix)	Republican	Jan 3, 1953 – Jan 3, 1965	Elected in 1952.	8	83rd	8	Re-elected in 1950.	Mar 4, 1927 – Jan 3, 1969	Democratic	Carl Hayden (Phoenix)	3
3	Barry Goldwater (Phoenix)	Republican	Jan 3, 1953 – Jan 3, 1965	Elected in 1952.	8	84th	8	Re-elected in 1950.	Mar 4, 1927 – Jan 3, 1969	Democratic	Carl Hayden (Phoenix)	3
3	Barry Goldwater (Phoenix)	Republican	Jan 3, 1953 – Jan 3, 1965	Elected in 1952.	8	85th	9	Re-elected in 1956.	Mar 4, 1927 – Jan 3, 1969	Democratic	Carl Hayden (Phoenix)	3
3	Barry Goldwater (Phoenix)	Republican	Jan 3, 1953 – Jan 3, 1965	Re-elected in 1958. Retired to run for U.S. President.	9	86th	9	Re-elected in 1956.	Mar 4, 1927 – Jan 3, 1969	Democratic	Carl Hayden (Phoenix)	3
3	Barry Goldwater (Phoenix)	Republican	Jan 3, 1953 – Jan 3, 1965	Re-elected in 1958. Retired to run for U.S. President.	9	87th	9	Re-elected in 1956.	Mar 4, 1927 – Jan 3, 1969	Democratic	Carl Hayden (Phoenix)	3
3	Barry Goldwater (Phoenix)	Republican	Jan 3, 1953 – Jan 3, 1965	Re-elected in 1958. Retired to run for U.S. President.	9	88th	10	Re-elected in 1962. Retired.	Mar 4, 1927 – Jan 3, 1969	Democratic	Carl Hayden (Phoenix)	3
4	Paul Fannin (Phoenix)	Republican	Jan 3, 1965 – Jan 3, 1977	Elected in 1964.	10	89th	10	Re-elected in 1962. Retired.	Mar 4, 1927 – Jan 3, 1969	Democratic	Carl Hayden (Phoenix)	3
4	Paul Fannin (Phoenix)	Republican	Jan 3, 1965 – Jan 3, 1977	Elected in 1964.	10	90th	10	Re-elected in 1962. Retired.	Mar 4, 1927 – Jan 3, 1969	Democratic	Carl Hayden (Phoenix)	3
4	Paul Fannin (Phoenix)	Republican	Jan 3, 1965 – Jan 3, 1977	Elected in 1964.	10	91st	11	Elected in 1968.	Jan 3, 1969 – Jan 3, 1987	Republican	Barry Goldwater (Scottsdale)	4
4	Paul Fannin (Phoenix)	Republican	Jan 3, 1965 – Jan 3, 1977	Re-elected in 1970. Retired.	11	92nd	11	Elected in 1968.	Jan 3, 1969 – Jan 3, 1987	Republican	Barry Goldwater (Scottsdale)	4
4	Paul Fannin (Phoenix)	Republican	Jan 3, 1965 – Jan 3, 1977	Re-elected in 1970. Retired.	11	93rd	11	Elected in 1968.	Jan 3, 1969 – Jan 3, 1987	Republican	Barry Goldwater (Scottsdale)	4
4	Paul Fannin (Phoenix)	Republican	Jan 3, 1965 – Jan 3, 1977	Re-elected in 1970. Retired.	11	94th	12	Re-elected in 1974.	Jan 3, 1969 – Jan 3, 1987	Republican	Barry Goldwater (Scottsdale)	4
5	Dennis DeConcini (Tucson)	Democratic	Jan 3, 1977 – Jan 3, 1995	Elected in 1976.	12	95th	12	Re-elected in 1974.	Jan 3, 1969 – Jan 3, 1987	Republican	Barry Goldwater (Scottsdale)	4
5	Dennis DeConcini (Tucson)	Democratic	Jan 3, 1977 – Jan 3, 1995	Elected in 1976.	12	96th	12	Re-elected in 1974.	Jan 3, 1969 – Jan 3, 1987	Republican	Barry Goldwater (Scottsdale)	4
5	Dennis DeConcini (Tucson)	Democratic	Jan 3, 1977 – Jan 3, 1995	Elected in 1976.	12	97th	13	Re-elected in 1980. Retired.	Jan 3, 1969 – Jan 3, 1987	Republican	Barry Goldwater (Scottsdale)	4
5	Dennis DeConcini (Tucson)	Democratic	Jan 3, 1977 – Jan 3, 1995	Re-elected in 1982.	13	98th	13	Re-elected in 1980. Retired.	Jan 3, 1969 – Jan 3, 1987	Republican	Barry Goldwater (Scottsdale)	4
5	Dennis DeConcini (Tucson)	Democratic	Jan 3, 1977 – Jan 3, 1995	Re-elected in 1982.	13	99th	13	Re-elected in 1980. Retired.	Jan 3, 1969 – Jan 3, 1987	Republican	Barry Goldwater (Scottsdale)	4
5	Dennis DeConcini (Tucson)	Democratic	Jan 3, 1977 – Jan 3, 1995	Re-elected in 1982.	13	100th	14	Elected in 1986.	Jan 3, 1987 – Aug 25, 2018	Republican	John McCain (Phoenix)	5
5	Dennis DeConcini (Tucson)	Democratic	Jan 3, 1977 – Jan 3, 1995	Re-elected in 1988. Retired.	14	101st	14	Elected in 1986.	Jan 3, 1987 – Aug 25, 2018	Republican	John McCain (Phoenix)	5
5	Dennis DeConcini (Tucson)	Democratic	Jan 3, 1977 – Jan 3, 1995	Re-elected in 1988. Retired.	14	102nd	14	Elected in 1986.	Jan 3, 1987 – Aug 25, 2018	Republican	John McCain (Phoenix)	5
5	Dennis DeConcini (Tucson)	Democratic	Jan 3, 1977 – Jan 3, 1995	Re-elected in 1988. Retired.	14	103rd	15	Re-elected in 1992.	Jan 3, 1987 – Aug 25, 2018	Republican	John McCain (Phoenix)	5
6	Jon Kyl (Phoenix)	Republican	Jan 3, 1995 – Jan 3, 2013	Elected in 1994.	15	104th	15	Re-elected in 1992.	Jan 3, 1987 – Aug 25, 2018	Republican	John McCain (Phoenix)	5
6	Jon Kyl (Phoenix)	Republican	Jan 3, 1995 – Jan 3, 2013	Elected in 1994.	15	105th	15	Re-elected in 1992.	Jan 3, 1987 – Aug 25, 2018	Republican	John McCain (Phoenix)	5
6	Jon Kyl (Phoenix)	Republican	Jan 3, 1995 – Jan 3, 2013	Elected in 1994.	15	106th	16	Re-elected in 1998.	Jan 3, 1987 – Aug 25, 2018	Republican	John McCain (Phoenix)	5
6	Jon Kyl (Phoenix)	Republican	Jan 3, 1995 – Jan 3, 2013	Re-elected in 2000.	16	107th	16	Re-elected in 1998.	Jan 3, 1987 – Aug 25, 2018	Republican	John McCain (Phoenix)	5
6	Jon Kyl (Phoenix)	Republican	Jan 3, 1995 – Jan 3, 2013	Re-elected in 2000.	16	108th	16	Re-elected in 1998.	Jan 3, 1987 – Aug 25, 2018	Republican	John McCain (Phoenix)	5
6	Jon Kyl (Phoenix)	Republican	Jan 3, 1995 – Jan 3, 2013	Re-elected in 2000.	16	109th	17	Re-elected in 2004.	Jan 3, 1987 – Aug 25, 2018	Republican	John McCain (Phoenix)	5
6	Jon Kyl (Phoenix)	Republican	Jan 3, 1995 – Jan 3, 2013	Re-elected in 2006. Retired.	17	110th	17	Re-elected in 2004.	Jan 3, 1987 – Aug 25, 2018	Republican	John McCain (Phoenix)	5
6	Jon Kyl (Phoenix)	Republican	Jan 3, 1995 – Jan 3, 2013	Re-elected in 2006. Retired.	17	111th	17	Re-elected in 2004.	Jan 3, 1987 – Aug 25, 2018	Republican	John McCain (Phoenix)	5
6	Jon Kyl (Phoenix)	Republican	Jan 3, 1995 – Jan 3, 2013	Re-elected in 2006. Retired.	17	112th	18	Re-elected in 2010.	Jan 3, 1987 – Aug 25, 2018	Republican	John McCain (Phoenix)	5
7	Jeff Flake (Mesa)	Republican	Jan 3, 2013 – Jan 3, 2019	Elected in 2012. Retired.	18	113th	18	Re-elected in 2010.	Jan 3, 1987 – Aug 25, 2018	Republican	John McCain (Phoenix)	5
7	Jeff Flake (Mesa)	Republican	Jan 3, 2013 – Jan 3, 2019	Elected in 2012. Retired.	18	114th	18	Re-elected in 2010.	Jan 3, 1987 – Aug 25, 2018	Republican	John McCain (Phoenix)	5
7	Jeff Flake (Mesa)	Republican	Jan 3, 2013 – Jan 3, 2019	Elected in 2012. Retired.	18	115th	19	Re-elected in 2016. Died.	Jan 3, 1987 – Aug 25, 2018	Republican	John McCain (Phoenix)	5
7	Jeff Flake (Mesa)	Republican	Jan 3, 2013 – Jan 3, 2019	Elected in 2012. Retired.	18	115th	19		Aug 25, 2018 – Sep 4, 2018	Vacant		
7	Jeff Flake (Mesa)	Republican	Jan 3, 2013 – Jan 3, 2019	Elected in 2012. Retired.	18	115th	19	Appointed to continue McCain's term. Resigned.	Sep 4, 2018 – Dec 31, 2018	Republican	Jon Kyl (Phoenix)	6
7	Jeff Flake (Mesa)	Republican	Jan 3, 2013 – Jan 3, 2019	Elected in 2012. Retired.	18	115th	19		Dec 31, 2018 – Jan 3, 2019	Vacant		
8	Kyrsten Sinema (Phoenix)	Democratic	Jan 3, 2019 – Jan 3, 2025	Elected in 2018. Left the Democratic Party on December 9, 2022. Retired.	19	116th	19	Appointed to continue McCain's term. Lost election to finish McCain's term.	Jan 3, 2019 – Dec 2, 2020	Republican	Martha McSally (Tucson)	7
8	Kyrsten Sinema (Phoenix)	Democratic	Jan 3, 2019 – Jan 3, 2025	Elected in 2018. Left the Democratic Party on December 9, 2022. Retired.	19	116th	19	Elected in 2020 to finish McCain's term.	Dec 2, 2020 – present	Democratic	Mark Kelly (Tucson)	8
8	Kyrsten Sinema (Phoenix)	Democratic	Jan 3, 2019 – Jan 3, 2025	Elected in 2018. Left the Democratic Party on December 9, 2022. Retired.	19	117th	19	Elected in 2020 to finish McCain's term.	Dec 2, 2020 – present	Democratic	Mark Kelly (Tucson)	8
8	Kyrsten Sinema (Phoenix)	Independent	Jan 3, 2019 – Jan 3, 2025	Elected in 2018. Left the Democratic Party on December 9, 2022. Retired.	19	117th	19	Elected in 2020 to finish McCain's term.	Dec 2, 2020 – present	Democratic	Mark Kelly (Tucson)	8
8	Kyrsten Sinema (Phoenix)	Independent	Jan 3, 2019 – Jan 3, 2025	Elected in 2018. Left the Democratic Party on December 9, 2022. Retired.	19	118th	20	Re-elected in 2022.	Dec 2, 2020 – present	Democratic	Mark Kelly (Tucson)	8
9	Ruben Gallego (Phoenix)	Democratic	Jan 3, 2025 – present	Elected in 2024.	20	119th	20	Re-elected in 2022.	Dec 2, 2020 – present	Democratic	Mark Kelly (Tucson)	8
9	Ruben Gallego (Phoenix)	Democratic	Jan 3, 2025 – present	Elected in 2024.	20	120th	20	Re-elected in 2022.	Dec 2, 2020 – present	Democratic	Mark Kelly (Tucson)	8
9	Ruben Gallego (Phoenix)	Democratic	Jan 3, 2025 – present	Elected in 2024.	20	121st	21	To be determined in the 2028 election.				
To be determined in the 2030 election.					21	122nd	21	To be determined in the 2028 election.				

== See also ==
- Arizona's congressional delegations
- Elections in Arizona
- List of United States representatives from Arizona
