= 1932 United States Senate election in Arizona =

- November 8, 1932
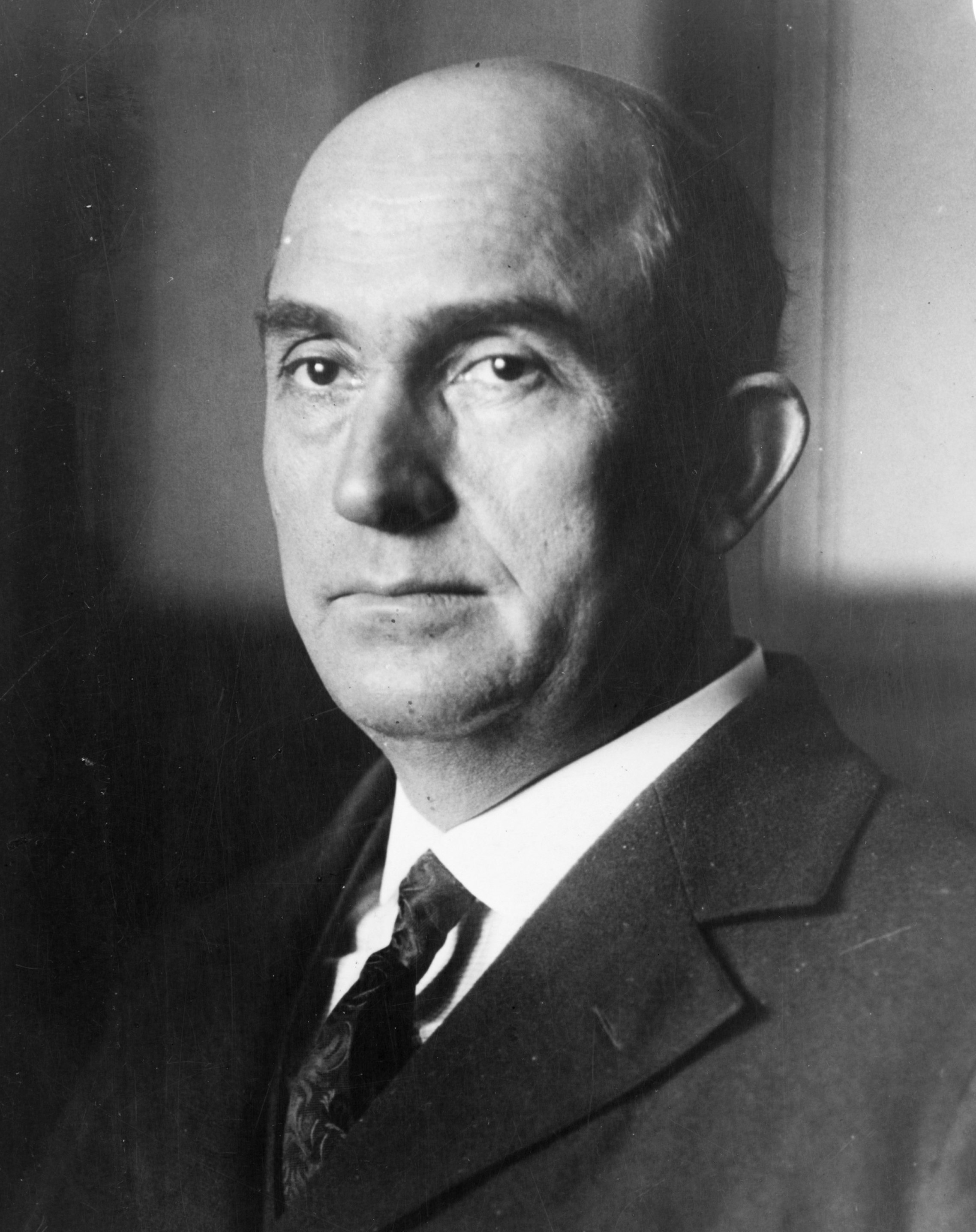

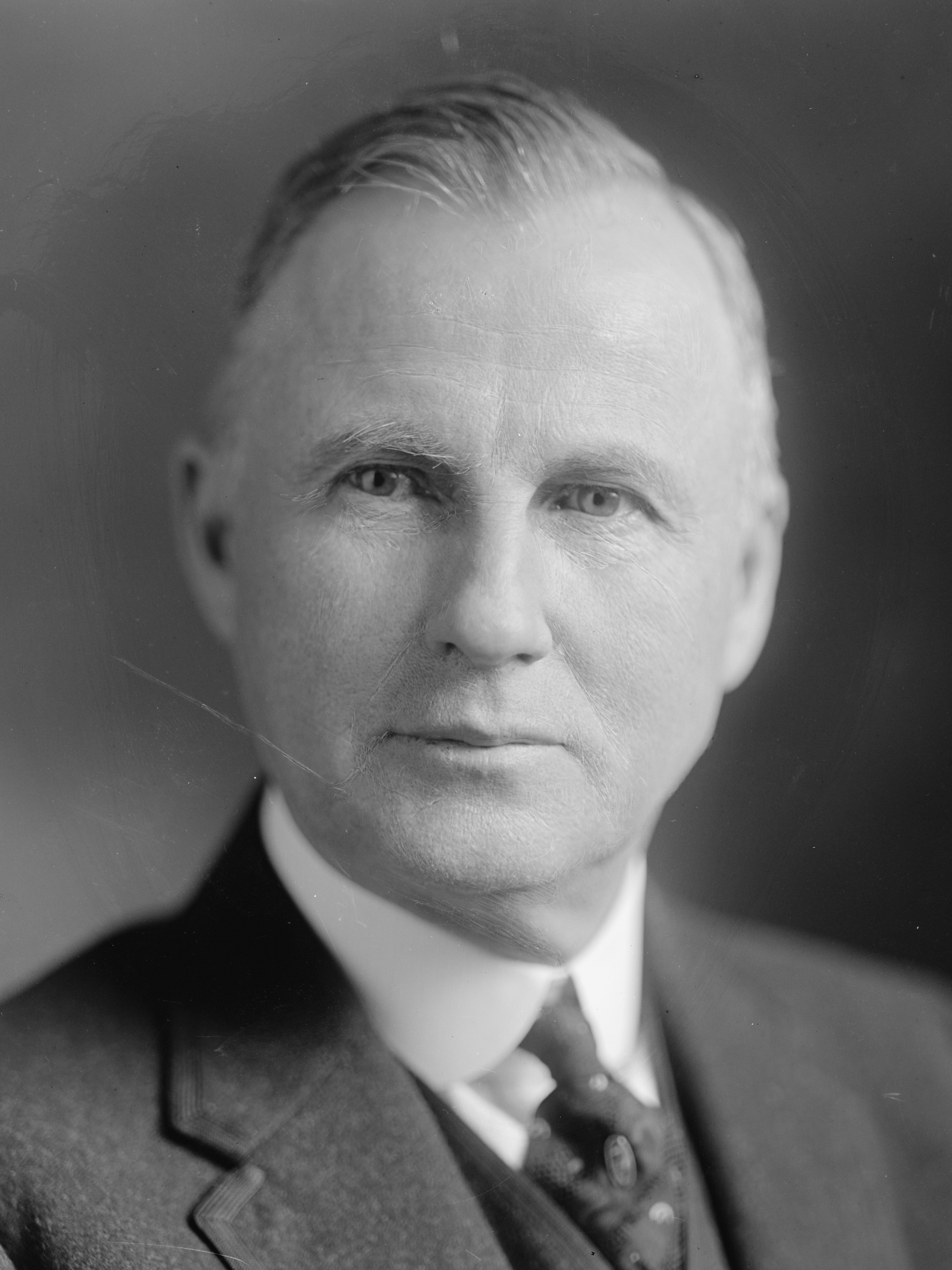
Nominee	Carl Hayden	Ralph H. Cameron
Party	Democratic	Republican
Popular vote	74,310	35,737
Percentage	66.67%	32.06%
- County results Hayden: 60–70% 70–80% 80–90%
U.S. senator before election
Carl Hayden
Democratic
Elected U.S. Senator
Carl Hayden
Democratic

The 1932 United States Senate elections in Arizona took place on November 8, 1932. Incumbent Democratic U.S. Senator Carl Hayden ran for reelection to a second term, again defeating his 1926 challenger former U.S. Senator Ralph H. Cameron in the general election.

Hayden, then U.S. Congressman for Arizona's at-large Congressional district, was elected to his first term in 1926 when he defeated the incumbent Cameron, and would be reelected to his second term in a rematch in 1932, by a wide margin. Candidates from the Socialist and Communist Parties also ran in the election, but did not garner much support, barely registering at 1% or less. This would be Cameron's final attempt at returning to the U.S. Senate, leaving Arizona soon after, and living for a time in both Philadelphia and Los Angeles.

== Democratic primary ==
The Democratic primary was held on September 8, 1932. Incumbent U.S. Senator Carl T. Hayden received significant opposition in the primary from Harlow W. Akers, an attorney. Hayden went on to win his party's nomination, however.

=== Candidates ===
- Carl T. Hayden, incumbent U.S. Senator
- Harlow W. Akers, attorney
- William J. Fellows
- Walter H. Colyar, Salt River valley miner

=== Results ===
Democratic primary results
Party	Candidate	Votes	%
Democratic	Carl T. Hayden (incumbent)	38,924	48.5%
Democratic	Harlow W. Akers	30,802	38.3%
Democratic	William J. Fellows	6,449	8.0%
Democratic	Walter H. Colyar	4,161	5.2%
Total votes		80,336	100.0

== Republican primary ==
=== Candidates ===
- Ralph H. Cameron, former U.S. Senator
- Hoval A. Smith, nominee for U.S. Senate in 1912 (Class 3)

=== Results ===
Republican primary results
Party	Candidate	Votes	%
Republican	Ralph H. Cameron	10,350	59.3%
Republican	Hoval A. Smith	7,105	40.7%
Total votes		17,455	100.0

== General election ==
United States Senate election in Arizona, 1932
Party	Candidate	Votes	%	±%
Democratic	Carl T. Hayden (incumbent)	74,310	66.67%	+8.33%
Republican	Ralph H. Cameron	35,737	32.06%	−9.60%
Socialist	Lester B. Woolever	1,110	1.00%	
Communist	Edward Haustgen	306	0.27%	
Majority		38,573	34.61%	+17.93%
Turnout		111,463		
Democratic hold		Swing		

== See also ==
- United States Senate elections, 1932
