= 1962 United States Senate election in Arizona =

- November 6, 1962
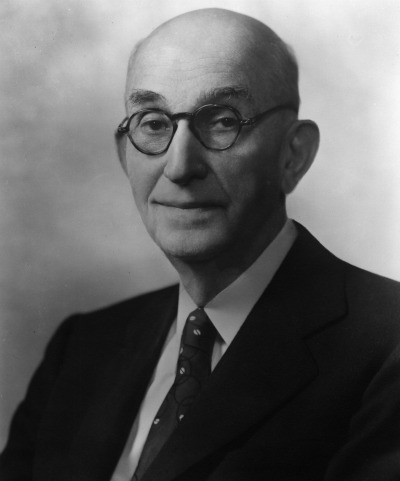

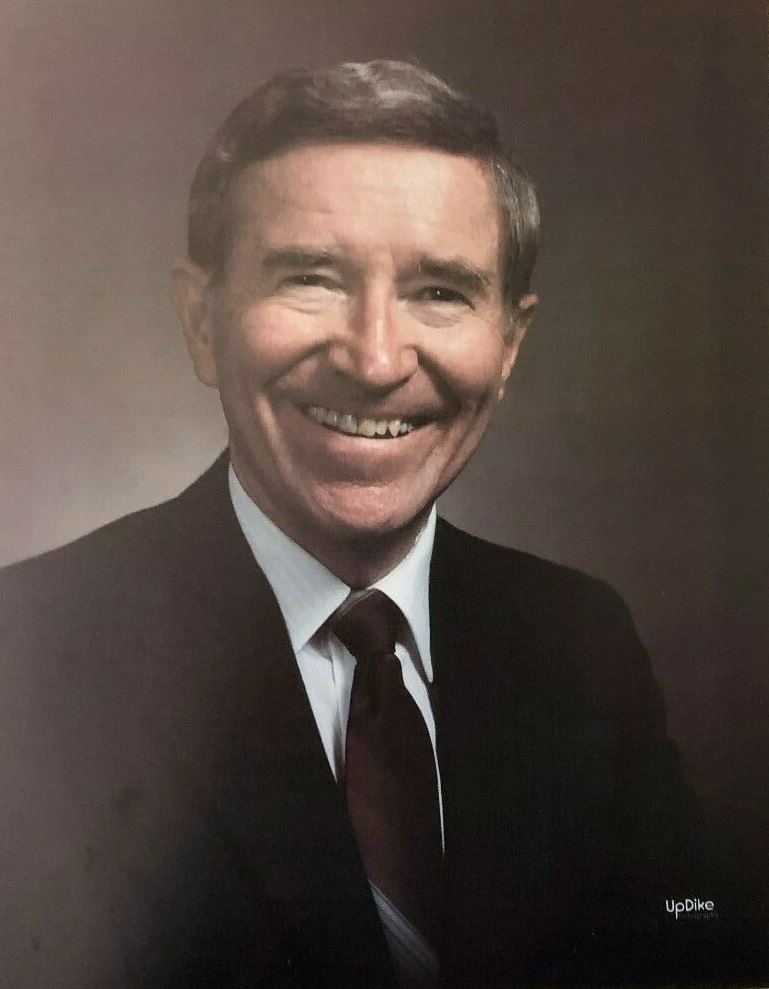
| Nominee | Carl Hayden | Evan Mecham |
| Party | Democratic | Republican |
| Popular vote | 199,217 | 163,338 |
| Percentage | 54.94% | 45.06% |
- County results Hayden: 50–60% 60–70% 70–80% Mecham: 50–60%
U.S. senator before election
Carl Hayden
Democratic
Elected U.S. Senator
Carl Hayden
Democratic

The 1962 United States Senate election in Arizona took place on November 6, 1962. Incumbent Democratic U.S. senator Carl Hayden ran for reelection to a seventh term, defeating Republican State senator Evan Mecham in the general election. Mecham became Governor of Arizona more than two decades later, and was subsequently impeached and removed from office.

This would be Hayden's final run for U.S. Senate, as he would be succeeded in office by Barry Goldwater in 1968. This was the last time Democrats won the Class 3 Senate seat from Arizona until Mark Kelly's victory in the 2020 special election, and the last time until 2022, when Kelly was reelected, that Democrats won a full term in this seat.

== Democratic primary ==
=== Candidates ===
- Carl T. Hayden, incumbent U.S. Senator
- W. Lee McLane

=== Results ===
Democratic primary results
| Party | Candidate | Votes | % |
|---|---|---|---|
| Democratic | Carl T. Hayden (incumbent) | 117,688 | 76.5% |
| Democratic | W. Lee McLane | 36,158 | 23.5% |
| Total votes | | 153,846 | 100.0% |

== Republican primary ==
State senator Evan Mecham ran for U.S. Senate, and was challenged by political operative and strategist Stephen Shadegg. Shadegg, who had served as campaign manager for both Republican and Democratic candidates, had run at the urging of Senator Barry Goldwater, but Goldwater failed to officially endorse any candidate in the Republican primary. Shadegg later said that he was "terribly let down" by Goldwater's position of neutrality in the primary after Goldwater had urged Shadegg to seek the seat.

=== Candidates ===
- Evan Mecham, State Senator & future Governor of Arizona
- Stephen Shadegg, political strategist

=== Results ===
Republican primary results
| Party | Candidate | Votes | % |
|---|---|---|---|
| Republican | Evan Mecham | 40,300 | 59.0% |
| Republican | Stephen Shadegg | 27,965 | 41.0% |
| Total votes | | 68,265 | 100.0% |

== General election ==
United States Senate election in Arizona, 1962
| Party | Candidate | Votes | % | ±% |
|---|---|---|---|---|
| Democratic | Carl T. Hayden (incumbent) | 199,217 | 54.94% | −6.45% |
| Republican | Evan Mecham | 163,388 | 45.06% | +6.45% |
| Majority | | 35,829 | 9.88% | −12.89% |
| Turnout | | 362,605 | | |
| Democratic hold | | Swing | | |

== See also ==
- 1962 United States Senate elections
