= 1950 United States Senate election in Arizona =

- November 7, 1950
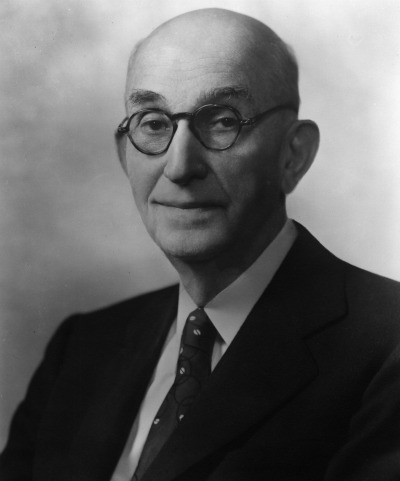

Nominee	Carl Hayden	Bruce Brockett
Party	Democratic	Republican
Popular vote	116,246	68,846
Percentage	62.80%	37.20%
- County results Hayden: 50–60% 60–70% 70–80% 80–90%
U.S. senator before election
Carl Hayden
Democratic
Elected U.S. Senator
Carl Hayden
Democratic

The 1950 United States Senate elections in Arizona took place on November 7, 1950. Incumbent Democratic U.S. Senator Carl Hayden ran for reelection to a fifth term, defeating Republican nominee Bruce Brockett in the general election. Brockett was formerly the Republican nominee for governor in both 1946 and 1948.

== Democratic primary ==
=== Candidates ===
- Carl T. Hayden, incumbent U.S. Senator
- Cecil H. Miller, Arizona Farm Bureau
- Robert E. Miller, candidate for U.S. Senate in 1938, 1940

=== Results ===
Democratic primary results
Party	Candidate	Votes	%
Democratic	Carl T. Hayden (incumbent)	95,544	71.0%
Democratic	Cecil H. Miller	24,340	18.1%
Democratic	Robert E. Miller	14,752	11.0%
Total votes		134,636	100.0

== Republican primary ==
=== Candidates ===
- Bruce Brockett, Republican nominee for governor in 1946, 1948

== General election ==
United States Senate election in Arizona, 1950
Party	Candidate	Votes	%	±%
Democratic	Carl T. Hayden (incumbent)	116,246	62.80%	−6.57%
Republican	Bruce Brockett	68,846	37.20%	+6.57%
Majority		47,400	25.61%	−13.13%
Turnout		185,092		
Democratic hold		Swing		

== See also ==
- United States Senate elections, 1950
