= Carl Hayden =

American politician (1877–1972)

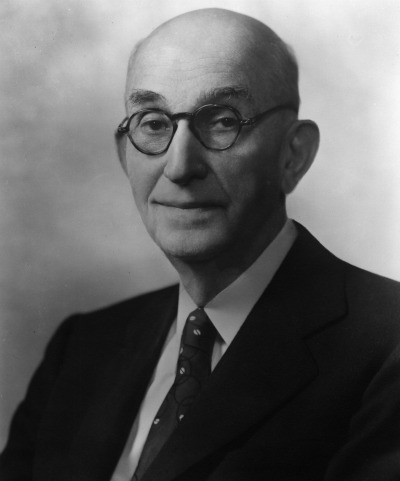

President pro tempore of the United States Senate
- In office January 3, 1957 – January 3, 1969 (Note: Lee Metcalf served as permanent acting president pro tempore after June 15, 1963, due to Hayden's routine sickness.)
- Preceded by: Walter F. George
- Succeeded by: Richard Russell Jr.

United States Senator from Arizona
- In office March 4, 1927 – January 3, 1969
- Preceded by: Ralph Henry Cameron
- Succeeded by: Barry Goldwater
Senate positions
Dean of the United States Senate
In office January 3, 1957 – January 3, 1969
Preceded by	Walter F. George
Succeeded by	Richard Russell Jr.
Chair of the Senate Appropriations Committee
In office January 3, 1955 – January 3, 1969
Preceded by	Styles Bridges
Succeeded by	Richard Russell Jr.
Ranking Member of the Senate Appropriations Committee
In office January 3, 1953 – January 3, 1955
Preceded by	Styles Bridges
Succeeded by	Styles Bridges
Chair of the Senate Rules Committee
In office January 3, 1949 – January 3, 1953
Preceded by	C. Wayland Brooks
Succeeded by	William E. Jenner
Ranking Member of the Senate Rules Committee
In office January 3, 1953 – January 3, 1955
Preceded by	Henry Cabot Lodge Jr.
Succeeded by	William E. Jenner
In office January 3, 1947 – January 3, 1949
Preceded by	Arthur Vandenberg
Succeeded by	Kenneth S. Wherry

Member of the U.S. House of Representatives from Arizona's at-large district
- In office February 19, 1912 – March 3, 1927
- Preceded by: Ralph Cameron (Delegate)
- Succeeded by: Lewis W. Douglas

17th Sheriff of Maricopa County
- In office 1907–1912
- Preceded by: William Cunningham (acting)
- Succeeded by: Jefferson Adams

Personal details
- Born: Carl Trumbull Hayden; October 2, 1877 Hayden's Ferry (now Tempe), Arizona Territory
- Died: January 25, 1972 (aged 94) Mesa, Arizona, U.S.
- Party: Democratic
- Spouse: Nan Downing (died 1961)
- Education: Arizona State University, Tempe; Stanford University

Military service
- Allegiance: United States
- Branch/service: United States Army; National Guard
- Rank: Major
- Unit: 9th Battalion, 166th Depot Brigade
- Battles/wars: World War I

Carl Trumbull Hayden (October 2, 1877 – January 25, 1972) was an American statesman. Representing Arizona in the United States Senate from 1927 to 1969, he was the first U.S. senator to serve seven terms. Serving as the state's first representative for eight terms before entering the Senate, Hayden set the record as the longest-serving member of the United States Congress more than a decade before his retirement from politics. He was Dean of the United States Senate and served as its president pro tempore and chairman of both its Rules and Administration and Appropriations committees. He was a member of the Democratic Party. Hayden was also the last remaining member of Congress to have served during the presidencies of William Howard Taft and Woodrow Wilson, as he retired in 1969.

Having earned a reputation as a reclamation expert early in his congressional career, Hayden consistently backed legislation dealing with public lands, mining, reclamation, and other projects affecting the Western United States. In addition, he played a key role in creating the funding formula for the federal highway system. President John F. Kennedy said of Hayden, "Every Federal program which has contributed to the development of the West—irrigation, power, reclamation—bears his mark, and the great Federal highway program which binds this country together, which permits this State to be competitive east and west, north and south, this in large measure is his creation."

Known as the "Silent Senator", Hayden rarely spoke on the Senate floor. Instead his influence came from committee meetings and Senate cloakroom discussions, where his comments were "given a respect comparable to canon law". A colleague said of him, "No man in Senate history has wielded more influence with less oratory," while the Los Angeles Times wrote that Hayden had "assisted so many projects for so many senators that when old Carl wants something for his beloved Arizona, his fellow senators fall all over themselves giving him a hand. They'd probably vote landlocked Arizona a navy if he asked for it."

== Background ==
Hayden was born to Charles Trumbull Hayden and Sallie Calvert Davis on October 2, 1877, in Hayden's Ferry, Arizona Territory (renamed Tempe in 1878). Charles Hayden was a Connecticut-born merchant and freight operator who had moved west due to a lung ailment and homesteaded a claim on the south bank of the Salt River. Charles Hayden had also served as a probate judge and, following Grover Cleveland's 1884 election, had been considered for the territorial governorship. Sallie Davis was an Arkansas-born schoolteacher who served as vice president of the Arizona Territorial Suffrage Association during the 1890s.

Following the birth of their son, Charles and Sallie Hayden had three daughters: Sarah (called Sallie), Anna, and Mary (called Mapes). Anna died unexpectedly at two-and-one-half years of age. The Hayden family operated a variety of business interests including a ferry service, a gristmill, a general store, and agricultural interests.

While he was growing up, Hayden's family took several trips, including journeys to Washington, D.C., and the 1893 Chicago World's Fair. To these, Hayden added several solo trips, including a horseback trip to the Grand Canyon and a trip to Mexico City when he was fourteen.

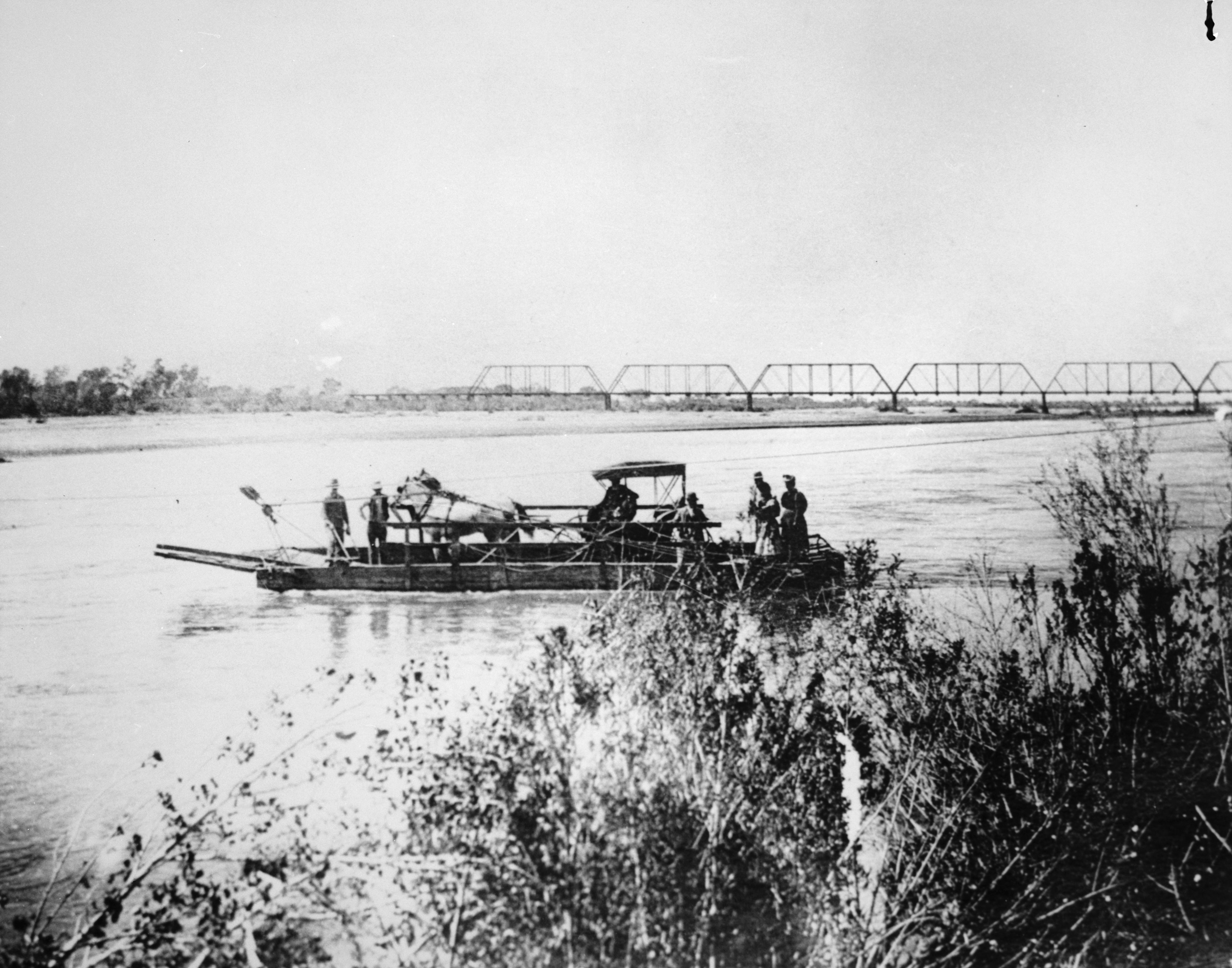
Hayden's Ferry crossing the Salt river, c. 1900

Hayden attended Tempe's Eighth Street School and Arizona Territorial Normal School (now Arizona State University). After his graduation from normal school in June 1896 he was enrolled at Stanford University where he studied economics, history, language, and philosophy with an interest in attending law school after graduation. While at Stanford, he was sophomore class president and participated in debate, fiction writing, football, and track. During his junior year, Hayden suffered his only election defeat when he narrowly lost the race for student body president. He attributed his loss to overconfidence and learned to "always run scared" in future elections. Hayden met his future wife, Nan Downing, while at Stanford. The couple married on February 14, 1908, and produced no children.

One semester from graduation, in December 1899, Hayden was forced to drop out of school when his father became ill. Charles Hayden died on February 5, 1900, leaving his son with responsibility for the family and control of the family business interests. Hayden sold the mercantile business to pay off outstanding debts and then rented most of the family's properties to provide an income that allowed him to move his mother and sisters to Palo Alto, California, where his sisters could attend college. In the fall of 1903, he enlisted in the Arizona Territorial National Guard and was elected captain within two months.

== Early political career ==
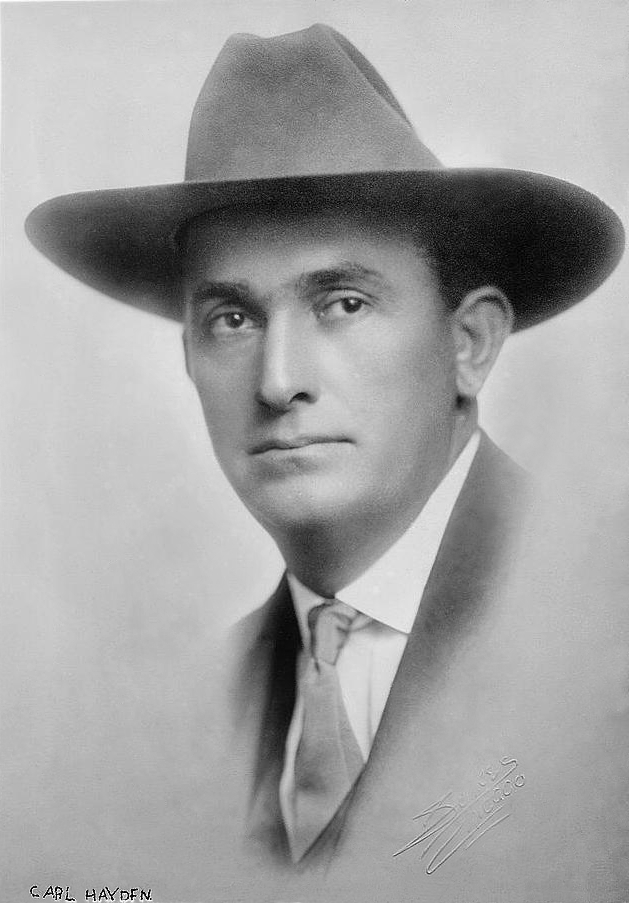
Hayden while as a sheriff

Soon after his return from Stanford, Hayden became active in Democratic Party politics. In September 1900 he represented Tempe as a delegate at a county level convention and became chairman of the Maricopa County Democratic Central Committee in 1902. Hayden was also elected to a two-year term on the Tempe town council. Following passage of the National Reclamation Act of 1902 he was sent to Washington, D.C. by interests in Tempe to lobby for funding of the Salt River Project.

Hayden led the Arizona Territory delegation to the 1904 Democratic National Convention in St. Louis. Later in 1904 he was elected Maricopa County treasurer. Hayden's two years as treasurer provided him practical experience with public finance and budgetary processes. After one term as county treasurer, he chose to pursue the more lucrative office of sheriff—the position providing a travel budget and a percentage of collected fees. The November 1906 election saw Hayden defeat his Republican and Prohibition party challengers by the largest margin of victory in any of the county races.

By the time Hayden became sheriff, Maricopa County had transformed from a Wild West frontier into a quiet agricultural settlement. Based in Phoenix, which had grown to a population of 10,000 people, he performed duties such as maintaining order, collecting fees from saloons and gambling halls, transportation of prisoners to other parts of the territory, and enforcing local ordinances such as a Phoenix law requiring local Indians to wear pants instead of a breechcloth when visiting town. During his time as sheriff, Hayden did not have to fire his firearm, although he did use an Apperson Jack Rabbit to pursue and capture two train robbers.

== House of Representatives ==
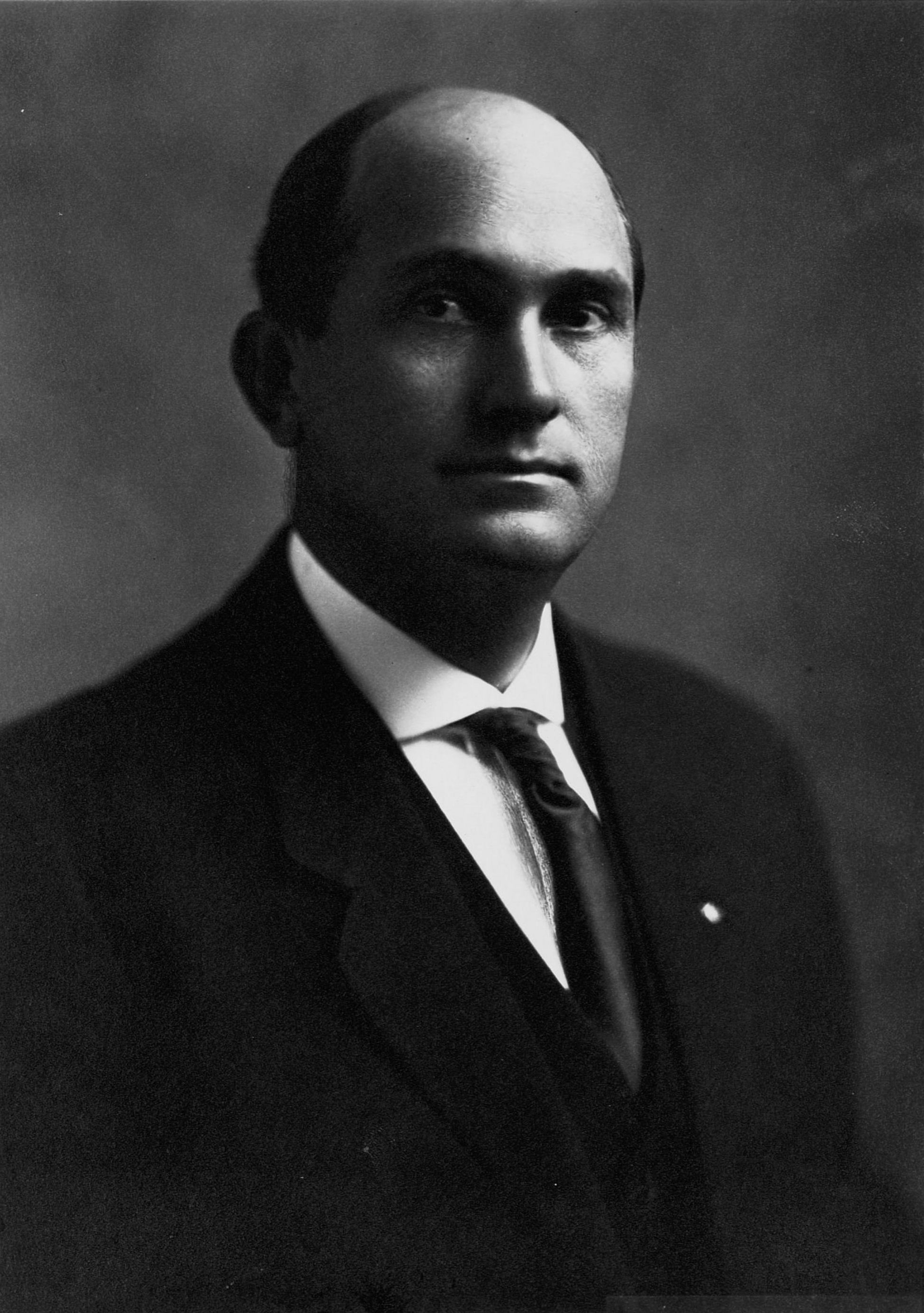
Hayden in 1912

Hayden's first run for Congress came during a 1911 special election called in anticipation of Arizona statehood. With the Democratic Party's influence in territorial politics, winning the party primary was tantamount to winning the general election. Hayden was considered an underdog to two other Democratic challengers and received an endorsement from only one Arizona newspaper. Due to his duties as sheriff along with his Arizona Territorial National Guard service, Hayden had become known to political leaders throughout the territory. These acquaintances, combined with the influence of his father's good reputation, allowed Hayden a surprise win in the Democratic primary which was followed by his election to the United States House of Representatives.

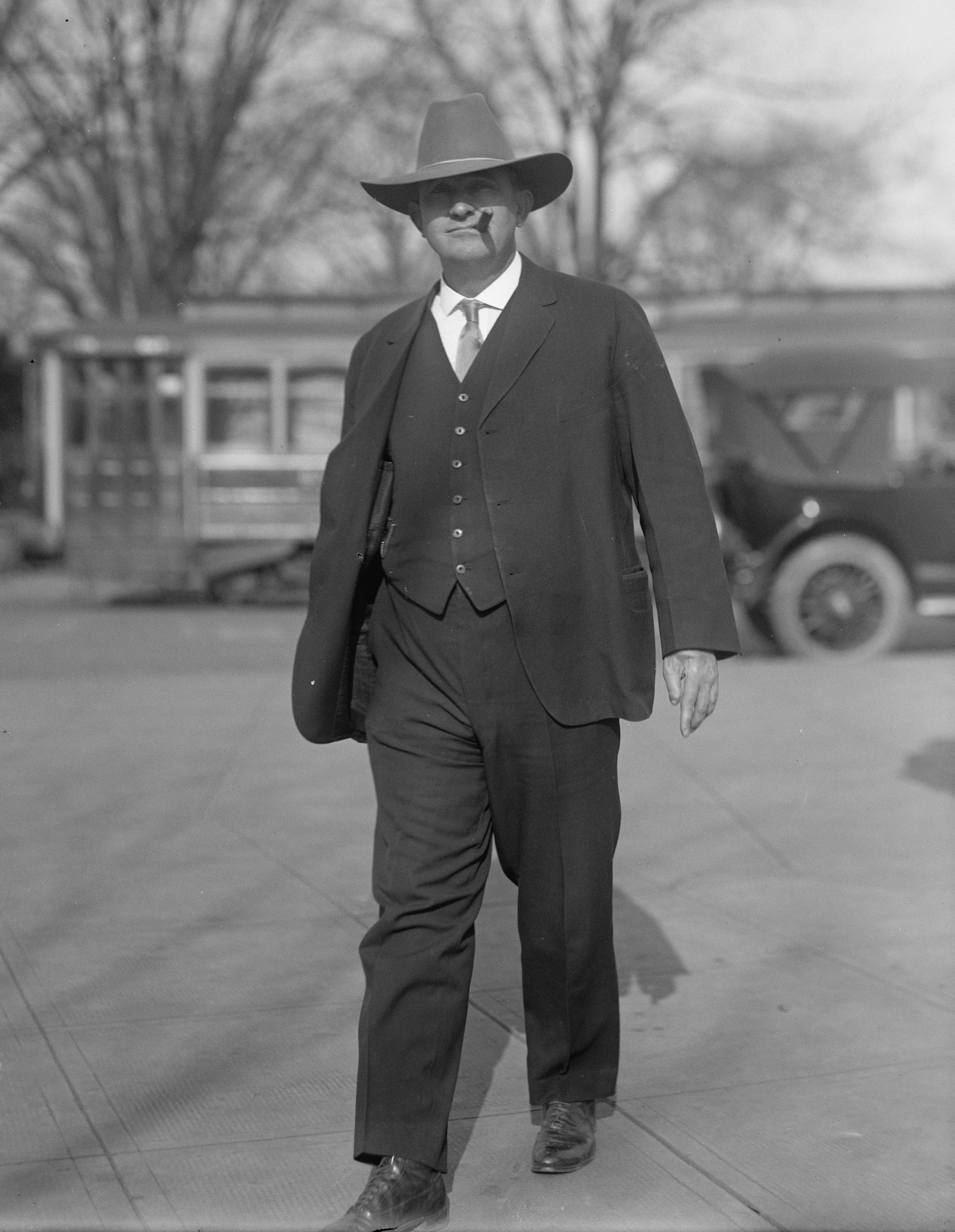
Carl Hayden (c. 1916)

The 1911 election set a number of precedents that would characterize Hayden's later political campaigns. The first was his tradition of never mentioning his opponent's name in public. He also began a practice of caravaning around the state with other members of his party, a pattern that continued until war-time rationing of the 1940s ended the custom. He also kept a lookout for candidates with a potential to run against him, occasionally sending letters encouraging the rumored candidates to run. With good home service of his constituents, Hayden rarely faced a strong challenge for his office.

Hayden gave the jail house keys to Deputy Jeff Adams and, with his wife, began the trip to Washington, D.C. the same day President William H. Taft signed the legislation granting Arizona statehood. Bearing credentials from Territorial Governor Richard Elihu Sloan, Hayden was sworn into the 62nd United States Congress on February 19, 1912. His goal while in Congress was to help his fledgling state develop its natural resources and infrastructure while growing the state's population. Due to the federal government controlling the majority of the state's land, Hayden also wished to involve the federal government in this process. Hayden's first bill, authorizing a railroad right-of-way to Fort Huachuca, was introduced on March 1, 1912.

With the 1913 start to his first full term, Hayden supported Woodrow Wilson's policies by voting for the Clayton Anti-Trust Act, Federal Reserve Act, Underwood Tariff Act, and creation of the Federal Trade Commission. He sponsored the Grand Canyon National Park Act, and, in honor of his mother, he introduced a joint resolution calling for women's suffrage. In 1914, Hayden secured an extension of repayment times for loans made under the National Reclamation Act of 1902 from ten to twenty years. The extension included greater flexibility in the payment amounts during the early repayment period. An additional change in the way that reclamation projects were funded came in 1922 with passage of Hayden's legislation authorizing revenues from sale of hydroelectric power to be credited to repayment of project debts. Favoring local control of reclamation projects, in 1917 Hayden wrote legislation transferring financial obligations and operations of the Salt River Project from the Bureau of Reclamation to a local government entity. The Bureau transferring control to local government agencies would become the model for future reclamation projects in The West. Other early efforts by Hayden included sponsoring the creation of the Grand Canyon National Park and the 1919 legislation resulting in the Nineteenth Amendment to the United States Constitution.

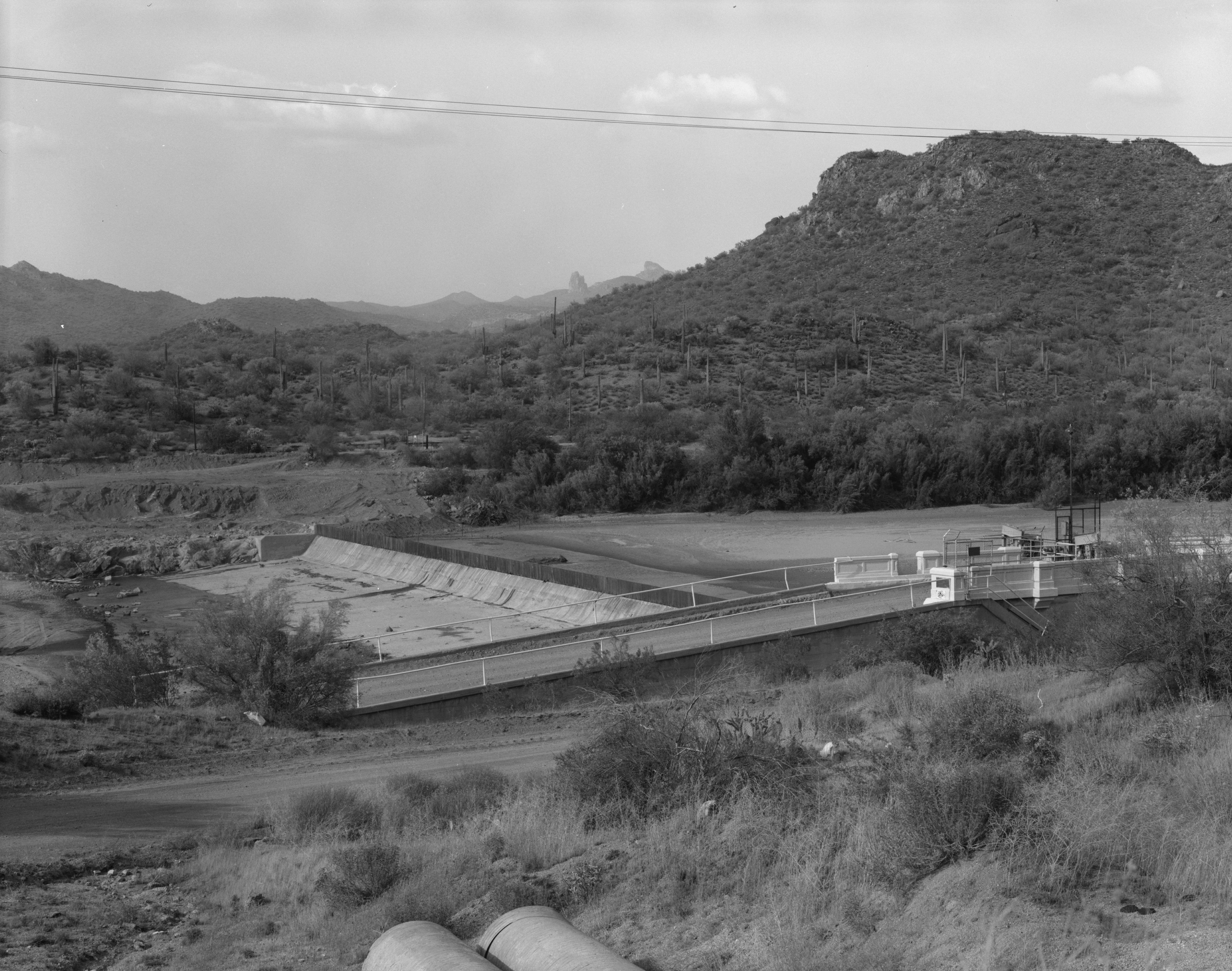
Ashurst-Hayden diversion dam, part of the San Carlos Irrigation Project.

Beginning with an appropriation during his first term for the United States Army Corps of Engineers to perform a study accessing the feasibility of building a flood control dam, Hayden sought to bring a reclamation project to the Gila River. Following a favorable feasibility report on the project, Hayden introduced legislation authorizing the San Carlos Project in 1914. Bill opponents claimed that Arizona had already received an overly large share of federal reclamation funds and the legislation was defeated.

Using the fact that the Pima Indians would be one of the primary beneficiaries of the project, Hayden switched tactics and, in 1916, began inserting a series of appropriations into the annual Indian Appropriations Act that paid for the construction of a diversion dam downstream of the planned reservoir. By 1922, the diversion dam was completed and named after Hayden and Arizona Senator Henry Fountain Ashurst. Final passage of the San Carlos project came in 1924 when Senator Ralph H. Cameron, Arizona's sole Republican in the Republican-controlled 68th Congress, reintroduced the San Carlos bill. Calvin Coolidge signed the bill into law after the name "Coolidge Dam" was selected for the primary dam.

Hayden voted for American entry into World War I and then successfully added an amendment to a military manpower bill that prohibited conscripted personnel from avoiding military service by buying their way out and requiring all draftees to remain in the military until the end of the war. He also favored humane treatment of conscientious objectors. In the summer of 1917 Hayden proposed to President Wilson that the Industrial Workers of the World labor union be declared an outlaw organization so that vigilantes could take care of them. As an officer in the Arizona National Guard prior to the war, Major Hayden volunteered to join his unit and served as commander of the 9th battalion, 166th Depot Brigade at Camp Lewis, Washington helping prepare his division for active duty. The war ended before his unit was transferred to Europe.

While still in the House of Representatives, Hayden became involved in a decades-long dispute over water rights for the Colorado River. California interests at the time wanted to construct a water storage dam along with an All-American Canal to allow irrigation of the Imperial Valley without routing the water through Mexico. Apportionment of the river's waters was a contentious issue and Arizona refused to approve the Colorado River Compact designed to determine allocation of water to each of the states in Colorado's watershed.

As a result of this disagreement when Representative Phil Swing and Senator Hiram Johnson, both from California, introduced legislation authorizing the Boulder Canyon Project, Hayden became a leader of the opposition. To this end, Hayden engaged in a variety of parliamentary procedures that prevented the Swing-Johnston bill reaching the House floor for a vote until after he had left the House of Representatives for the Senate.

== Senate ==
During Hayden's first run for the Senate in 1926, he based his campaign on his record of defending Arizona's interests in the water rights dispute with California. To this effort his campaign poster was composed of editorial headlines from California newspapers decrying Hayden's effectiveness at preventing passage of the Swing-Johnson Bill authorizing construction of Boulder Dam. The campaign saw allegations of misconduct raised with incumbent Ralph H. Cameron claiming Hayden had used a slush fund received from out-of-state interests. An inquiry led by Senator William H. King was begun several days before the election and found no evidence of wrongdoing. "Senator Cameron's 'slush fund' charges proved to be a boomerang which added considerably to my majority" observed Hayden after the election.

Upon Hayden's election to the Senate, he received what Senator Thomas J. Walsh called "choice committee assignments", including a seat on the Appropriations Committee. As a result of his seat on the Appropriations Committee, much of Hayden's efforts in the Senate were shifted away from policy making functions and toward control, allocation, and oversight of the financial funds used to implement legislated policy. Other committee assignments that would help shape his Senate career included Interior and Insular Affairs, Post Office and Post Roads, Rules and Administration, and the United States Congress Joint Committee on Printing.

=== 1920s ===
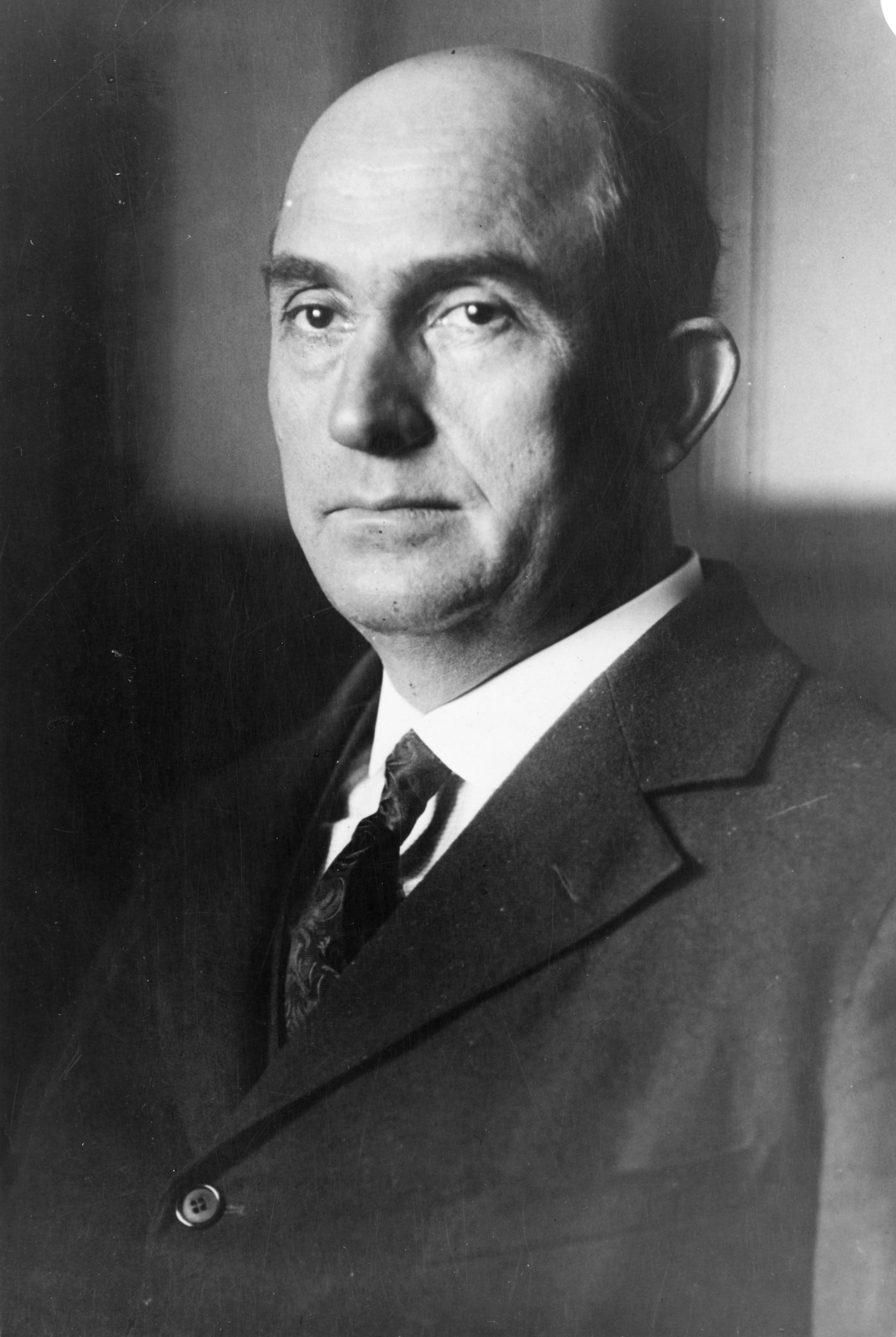
Hayden (sometime between 1920 and 1932), in the middle of his congressional career

Upon moving to the Senate in March 1927, Hayden continued his opposition to the Boulder Canyon Project. With growing national support for the project, however, it became obvious to Hayden that passage of the bill was inevitable. Seeking time to gain terms more favorable to Arizona, he continued his opposition with the aid of two filibusters from Arizona's other Senator, Henry F. Ashurst, and was able to delay a vote of the full Senate on the measure until the end of the 70th Congress' first session. When the Swing-Johnston bill came up for a vote on May 28, 1928, Hayden made his first speech from the floor of the Senate, a filibuster in which he spoke for nine hours during an all-night session before allowing Ashurst to take over for another twelve hours.

Passage of the Boulder Canyon Project came shortly after Congress reconvened in December 1928. Politically unpopular in Arizona, the final bill did contain several important concessions for Arizona. An amendment by Nevada Senator Key Pittman was added to the bill and set water allotments from the Colorado to 300,000 acre-feet (0.37 km^{3}) per year to Nevada, 4,400,000 acre-feet (5.4 km^{3}) per year to California and 2,800,000 acre-feet (3.5 km^{3}) per year to Arizona with exclusive rights to all waters from the Gila River also going to Arizona. The final bill also included authorization to pay both Arizona and Nevada an amount comparable to the tax revenues that would be generated if the dam had been built by private enterprise. Following passage of the bill, Hayden switched his form of opposition by working to deny funds for the Boulder Canyon Project.

=== 1930s ===
Hayden's 1932 campaign saw him coming close to defeat. Votes against early payment of the World War I veterans' bonus and for prohibition, the Senate vote for repeal of prohibition not coming until 1933, caused him to lose support from his Depression-era constituents and he only won a plurality during the primary. Hayden later speculated that if he had faced only one opponent, he might not have won.

With President Franklin D. Roosevelt 1932 election and the start of the New Deal, Hayden dropped opposition of the Boulder Canyon Project and began lobbying for additional irrigation and hydroelectric projects. He actively supported the Central Valley Project and acted as floor manager for the Grand Coulee Dam's appropriation legislation. Due to Hayden's efforts, Senator Warren Magnuson of Washington would later call him "the father of the Grand Coulee Dam". When demands for new projects during the 1930s drained the Reclamation Fund faster than repayments could replenish it, Hayden worked with Senator Joseph C. O'Mahoney of Wyoming to secure new funding by allocating revenue from offshore oil reserves to the Reclamation Fund.

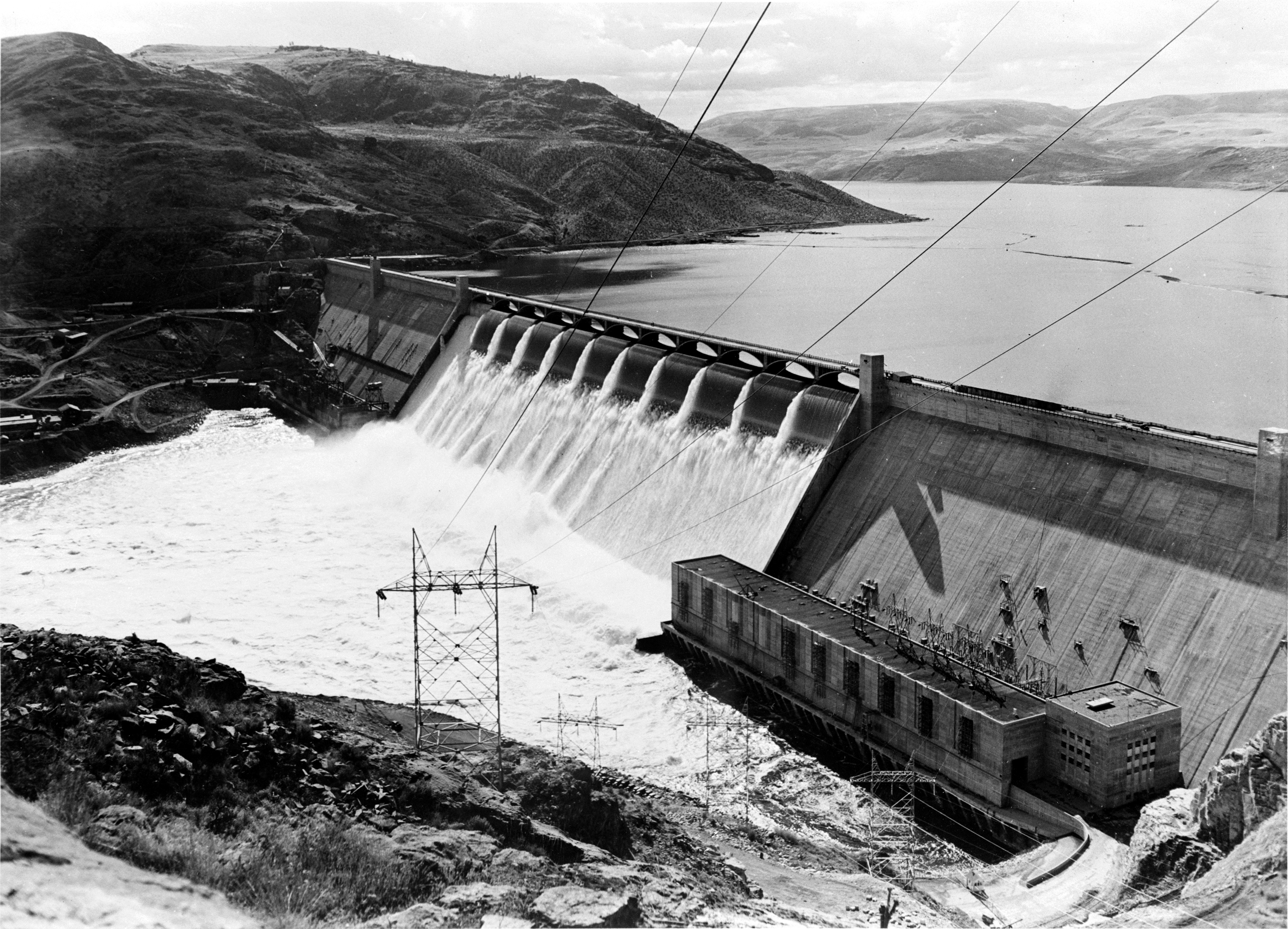
Hayden was called "the father of the Grand Coulee Dam".

Due to Hayden's seat on the Senate Committee on Post Office and Post Roads, he worked on a number of legislative initiatives promoting highway transportation. His interest in the subject was such that President Roosevelt asked why he always wished to talk about roads, to which Hayden replied, "Because Arizona has two things people will drive thousands of miles to see—Grand Canyon and the Petrified Forest. They can't get there without roads." The first piece of legislation came in 1933 with US$400 million in federal matching funds targeted at highway construction included in the National Industrial Recovery Act. This was followed the next year when Hayden and Oklahoma Representative Wilburn Cartwright introduced the Hayden-Cartwright Act.

This act was the first that allowed for funds to be used for advanced planning of future roads. It also allowed federal funds to be used for roads in urban areas, instead of just rural routes, and created disincentives to prevent states from diverting highway funds to other projects. A second Hayden-Cartwright Act authorized use of federal funds to build roads on Indian reservations and national parks and forests. In addition to road construction, Hayden also had an interest in promoting highway safety, joining with first-term Missouri Senator Harry S. Truman in 1939 to propose legislation cutting federal funds by a third for states that failed to enact licensing requirements along with other portions of the Uniform Vehicle Code.

In addition to his support of reclamation and highway projects, Hayden was also involved in other efforts to promote economic growth during the Great Depression. A proposal made in 1932 would have allowed repayment of war debts to the United States to be made in silver at a discounted rate. The plan was intended to raise the price of silver, increasing the value of US silver holdings and silver coinage worldwide. Effects of the depression however prevented repayment of most war debts and rendered the plan moot. Hayden also sponsored legislation creating the Farmers Home Administration, authorizing government-insured loans to farmers.

=== 1940s ===
With the 1940s and the coming of World War II, Hayden's focus shifted from public works to war-time needs. He lobbied a variety of Arizona groups to make land available and touting the favorable year-round flying weather, he assisted with the creation of a number of military bases throughout his home state, including the Luke and Williams training bases. An Army Desert Training Center built in southwestern Arizona and southeastern California was also used by American troops preparing for the North African campaign. As the United States prepared for possible war, Hayden in August 1940 advocated the use of volunteers instead of conscription to obtain needed manpower. He also introduced amendments prohibiting payment of money to avoid military service, draftees procuring substitutes, and securing of enlistments by the paying of bounties.

In 1945, Hayden suffered a personal tragedy when his wife, Nan, had a stroke. As a result, she was able to stand but could no longer walk and required the assistance of a nurse. Her need for assistance would continue until her death on June 25, 1961.

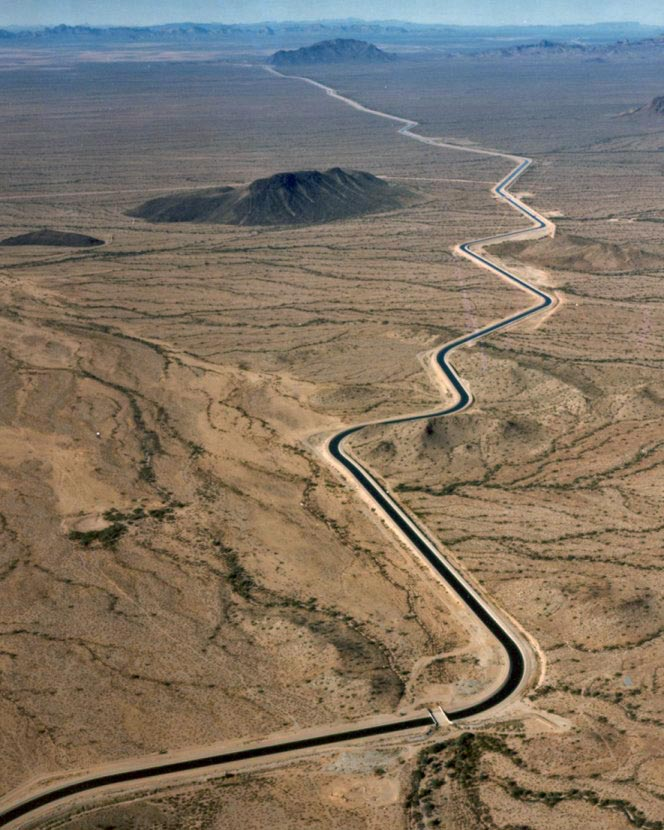
The Central Arizona Project, called "the most significant accomplishment of my career" by Hayden.

Following a 1944 treaty with Mexico granting the nation 1,500,000 acre-feet (1.9 km^{3}) per year of Colorado River water, Hayden began direct efforts to bring water from the river to Phoenix, Tucson, and the irrigable Arizona farmlands between the cities. To this end, he and Arizona's other senator, Ernest McFarland, introduced legislation in 1946 to build the Central Arizona Project. Unsuccessful in their first attempt, they reintroduced the legislation in 1947 where it passed the Senate but was defeated in the House by opposition from the California delegation.

The 1940s started an era of key committee chairmanships for Hayden. Due to the declining health of Kenneth McKellar, Hayden periodically served as acting chairman of the Appropriations committee during the 1940s and the 1950s. This activity included a significant amount of behind the scenes work with the committee's ranking Republican, Senator Styles Bridges, and enhanced Hayden's reputation for operating in Senate cloakrooms. Starting with the 81st Congress, Hayden became chairman of the Senate Rules Committee.

=== 1950s ===
Hayden's efforts to gain approval for the Central Arizona Project continued into the 1950s. Hayden and McFarland reintroduced their previous legislation in 1951 but it was again defeated in the House, this time due to concerns that full appropriation of Colorado waters had not occurred. The legislative setback prompted Arizona to file suit in the United States Supreme Court seeking adjudication of the water rights issue. The case, Arizona v. California, was accepted by the court on January 19, 1953, and would take over a decade to decide. In other reclamation efforts Hayden cosponsored the Colorado River Storage Act of 1956, authorizing construction of the Glen Canyon Dam and three other water storage dams.

The stable political environment in Arizona that Hayden had enjoyed during most of his career began to change by the 1950s. Following World War II, large numbers of Midwestern expatriates moved to Arizona and bolstered the growth of the Republican Party within the state. While he was still popular with long-term Arizona residents, many of the new arrivals were unfamiliar with Hayden's congressional record. As a result, during the 1956 election Hayden's campaign produced a number of television and radio appearances designed to inform voters of the Senator's accomplishments and dispel rumors of failing health and senility. The campaign also took advantage of a New York Times Magazine article that provided a complimentary portrait of Hayden's service in the Senate.

In 1956, Hayden was involved in a legal dispute when a United States district court judge issued a restraining order blocking the publication of a Senate pamphlet. Hayden, who was then the chairman of the Joint Committee on Printing, charged the order was unconstitutional and stated, "If a court can enjoin Congress from issuing a report it will only be a matter of time before our remarks on the floor of the Senate or the House of Representatives would be subject to a judicial review and a complete breakdown of the constitutional principal of separation of powers would ensue." Following a Printing Committee vote to ignore the order, Hayden directed the Government Printing Office to "disregard as unconstitutional the processes of any court in this case." The court ruling was later set aside by another federal judge stating the order had "constituted an unwarranted and unauthorized action by the judiciary" that interfered with the government's legislative function.

At the beginning of the 84th Congress, Hayden gave up his chairmanship of the Senate Rules Committee in order to become chairman of the Senate Appropriations Committee. The year 1955 saw him become a member of the newly formed Senate Democratic Policy Committee. Hayden also set several records for length of service, breaking Adolph Sabath's record for continuous service in Congress on October 21, 1957, and Joseph G. Cannon's record for total length of service in Congress on February 19, 1958. Hayden's record for longest service was not broken until November 18, 2009, by Robert Byrd.

=== 1960s ===
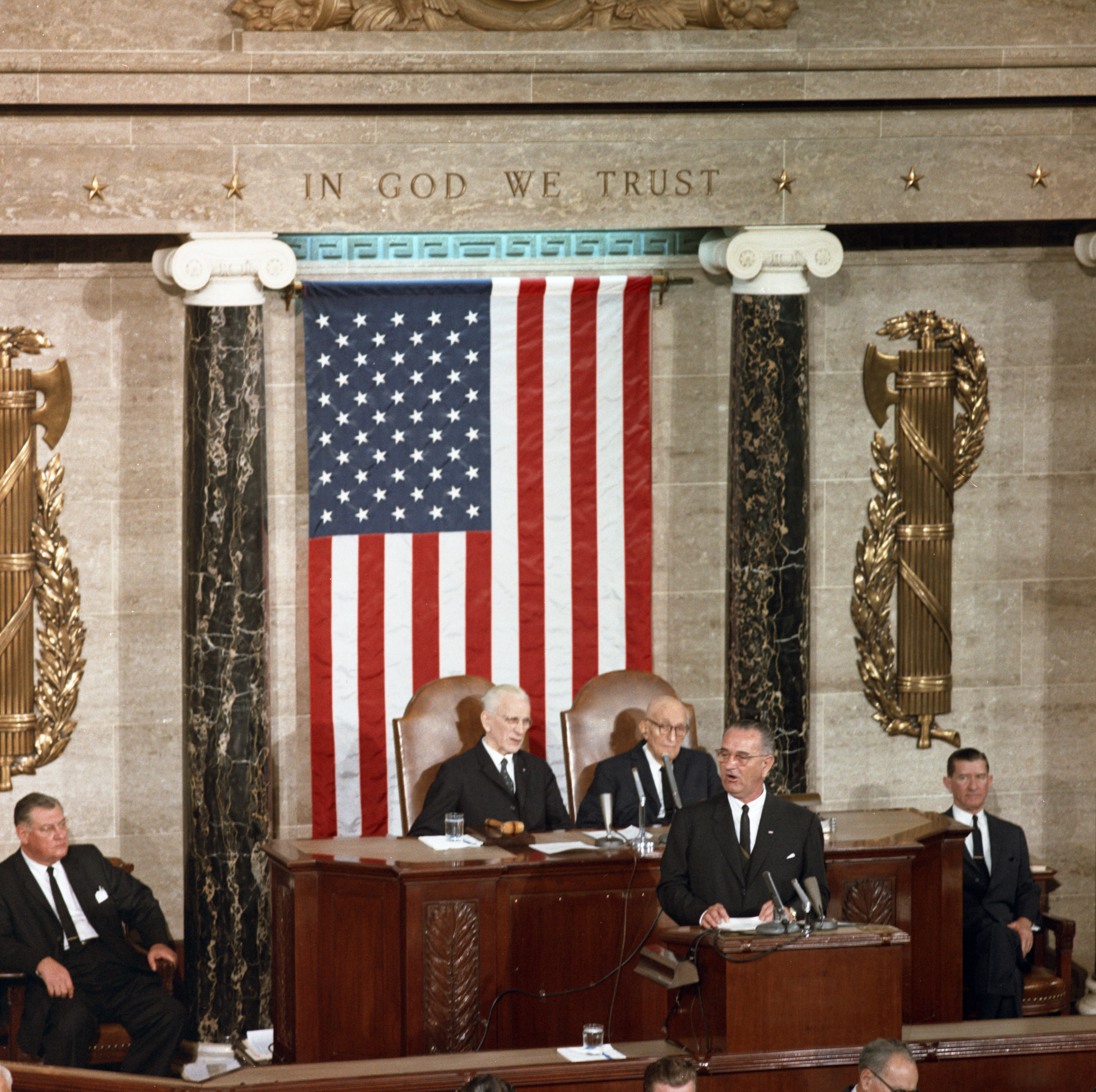
Hayden (center) with House Speaker John W. McCormack (left) during a 1963 address by President Lyndon B. Johnson (right)

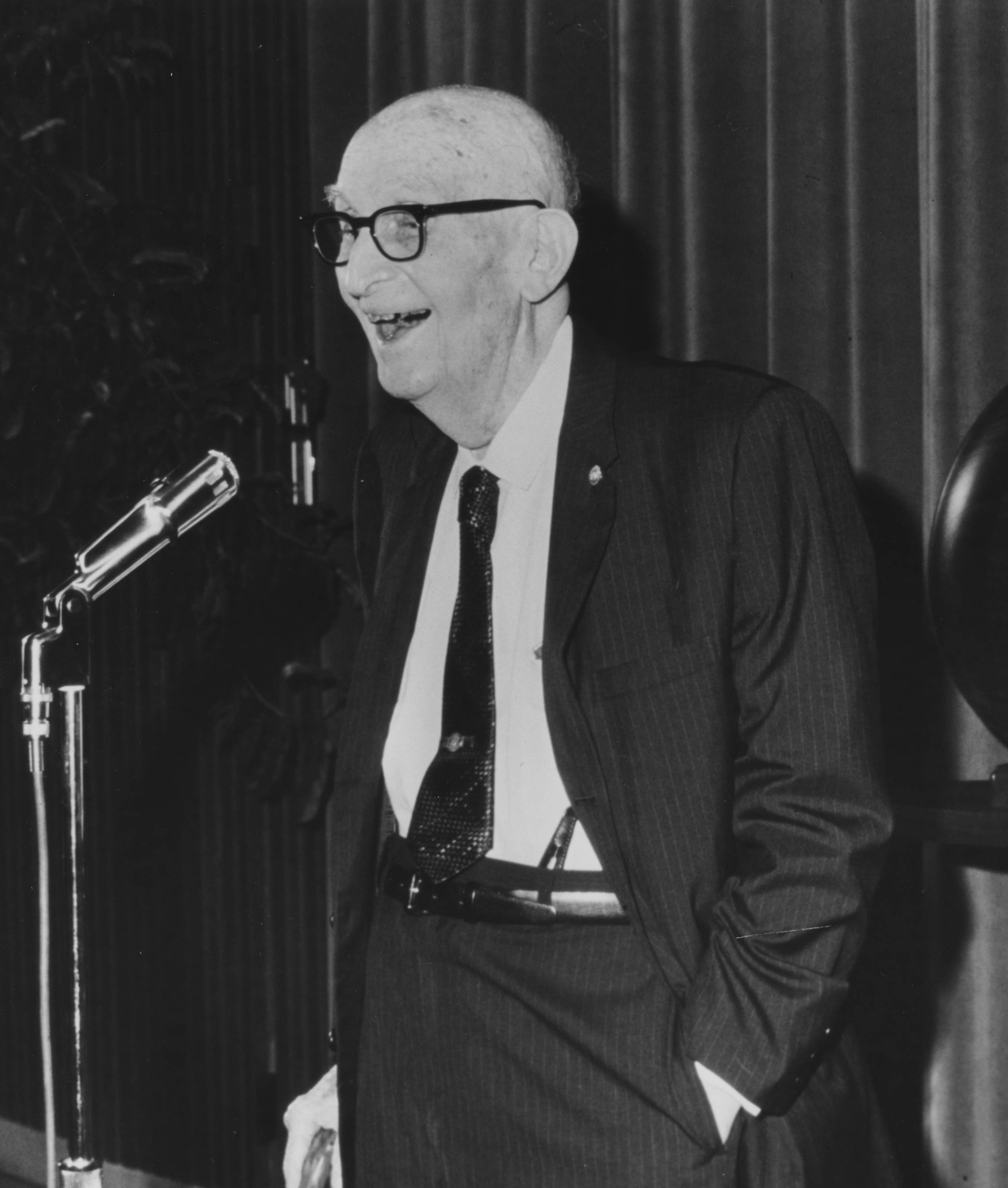
Hayden speaking

During 1962, Hayden came to national attention due to a dispute over procedural issues between the Senate Appropriations Committee and House Appropriations Committee. Billed in the press as a feud between two octogenarian chairmen, Hayden and Representative Clarence Cannon, the dispute began over the issue of where conference committees to resolve appropriation issues would meet. The Constitution required that all appropriations bills must originate in the House while long-standing tradition of the time held that conference committee meetings occurred on the Senate side of the United States Capitol with a senator chairing the committee. The dispute began in January 1962 when members of the House appropriations committee passed a resolution calling for the meeting location of the conference committee to be evenly split between the House and Senate side of the Capitol building. In response to this, the Senate appropriations committee passed a resolution calling for half of all appropriations bills to originate in the Senate. By April, Hayden had arranged for a meeting room located midway between the two chambers but House members refused to discuss the issue face-to-face until July, when US$55 billion in unapproved appropriations threatened to force a government shutdown.

During Hayden's final campaign in 1962, the Central Arizona Project was the central issue. State leaders saw his seniority as being key in gaining approval for the project. To aid his re-election, campaign staff arranged for a series of events to celebrate Hayden's fiftieth anniversary in Congress and raise awareness of his achievements. A series of viral infections suffered by the senator over the course of the year prompted rumors that the 85-year-old senator had died. To refute these rumors, Hayden held a press conference at Bethesda Naval Hospital three days before the election. Despite a growing Republican trend in Arizona, Hayden's Republican challenger, state representative and future governor Evan Mecham, only got lukewarm support from the state party. Arizona's Republican establishment felt Hayden's seniority was crucial for ensuring the project would pass. Ultimately, Hayden won a record seventh term, but only tallied 54.9 percent of the vote—easily the closest race of his Senate career, and his closest since his first bid for a full term in the House half a century earlier.

The events of the decade resulted in Hayden twice advancing to second place on the presidential line of succession. The first occurrence came on November 16, 1961, with the death of House Speaker Sam Rayburn when Hayden followed Vice President Lyndon B. Johnson and lasted until a new Speaker was elected. The second occurrence began with the November 22, 1963 assassination of President John F. Kennedy and continued until Hubert Humphrey became vice president on January 20, 1965. When asked of his plans if he had succeeded to the presidency, Hayden replied "I'd call Congress together, have the House elect a new speaker, and then I'd resign and let him become president."

Hayden's final legislative success was authorization of the Central Arizona Project. On June 4, 1963, one day after the Supreme Court issued a decision in Arizona v. California favorable to Arizona, Hayden joined with the rest of his state's congressional delegation in reintroducing legislation authorizing the water project. As in the bill's previous efforts, Hayden's influence was able to secure passage of the legislation in the Senate while passage in the House proved difficult. Initial opposition from the California delegation subsided by early 1965 after Governor Pat Brown declared, "California will not attempt to win by obstruction what it has not won by litigation", only to be replaced by opposition from Colorado Representative Wayne Aspinall. Aspinall, chairman of the House Interior Committee, refused to hold hearings on Hayden's bill. In response to the delays, Hayden waited until Aspinall returned home for vacation and then added his proposed bill as a rider to pork barrel bill containing patronage for a large number of Congressmen. In response to Hayden's maneuver, Aspinall returned from vacation to hold hearings on the Central Arizona Project. Final approval for the Central Arizona Project came on September 30, 1968, a day declared by President Johnson as "Carl Hayden Day". Hayden remarked on the occasion, "My efforts in behalf of the Central Arizona Project, began while I was still a Congressman and I consider it ... the most significant accomplishment of my career."

== Professional disposition ==
Hayden kept a considerably lower national profile than conventional wisdom would suggest for someone who spent more than half a century in Washington, including 42 years in the Senate. This came in part due to a conversation he had with Maryland Congressman Fred Talbott soon after he arrived in Washington in 1912. Talbott told him, "Son, there are two kinds of Congressmen—show horses and work horses. If you want to get your name in the papers, be a show horse. But if you want to gain the respect of your colleagues, don't do it. Be a work horse." Hayden quickly earned a reputation as a "service congressman" who faithfully responded to constituent mail, inserting vegetable or flower seed packets in his replies. Hayden believed that partisanship should end on election day, and his constituent service was performed in a nonpartisan manner.

During his time in office, Hayden avoided publicity and speech making. Following his filibuster of Boulder Dam, Hayden did not make another speech from the Senate floor for 20 years. By his later years, many of his congressional colleagues had not heard him make a full speech. His avoidance of public speaking did not impair Hayden in his duties, with then Senator Lyndon B. Johnson saying "He is living proof that effectiveness and statesmanship are not necessarily coupled with talkativeness" and Arthur Edson of the Associated Press writing, "He has kept his mouth shut while astutely pushing out invisible tentacles of power".

== After office ==
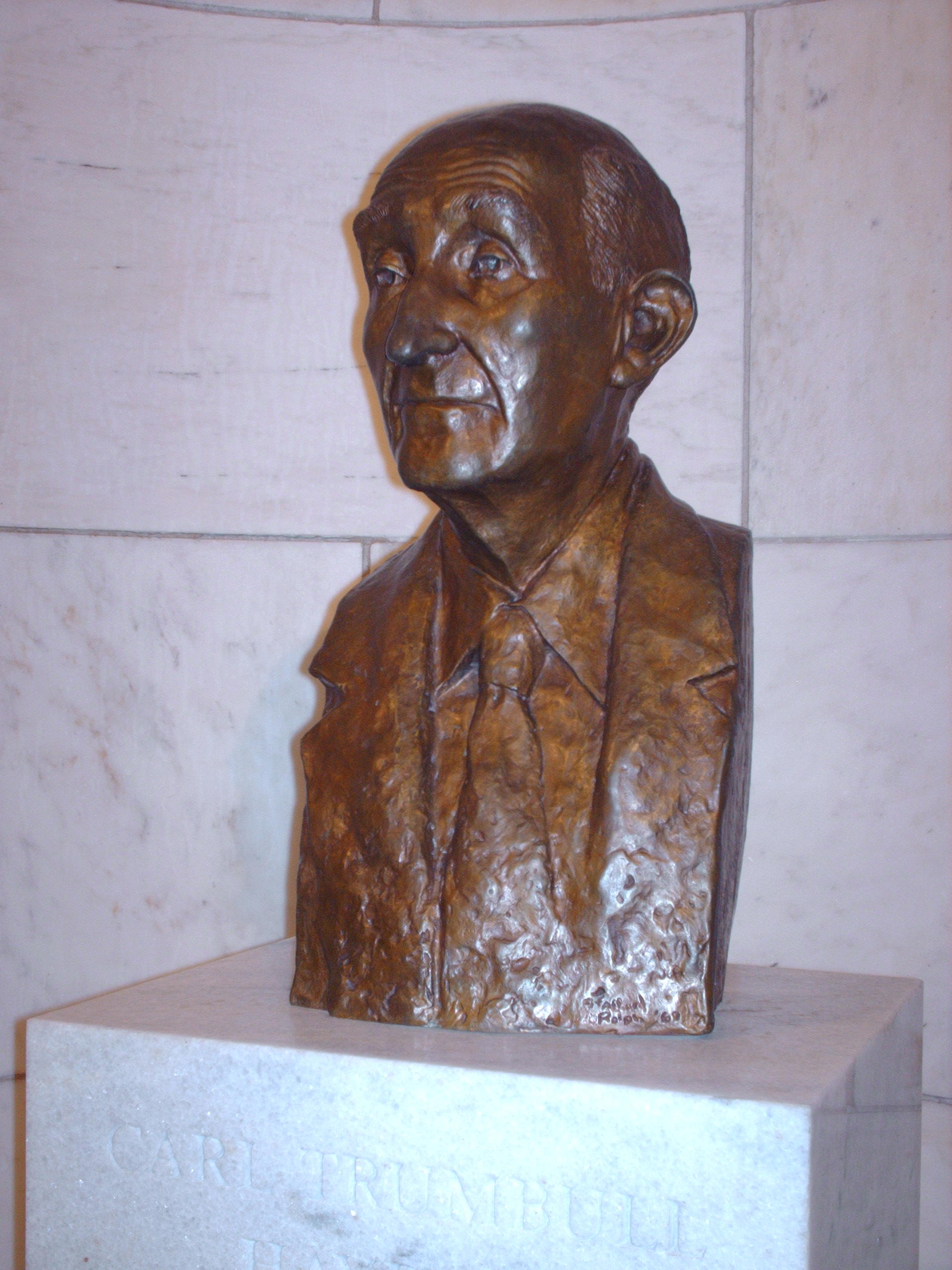
Bust of Hayden in the Russell Senate Office Building

Hayden announced his retirement on May 6, 1968, saying "Among other things that fifty-six years in Congress have taught me is that contemporary events need contemporary men. Time actually makes specialists of us all. When a house is built there is a moment for the foundation, another for the walls, the roof and so on. Arizona's foundation includes fast highways, adequate electric power, and abundant water, and these foundations have been laid. It is time for a new building crew to report, so I have decided to retire from office at the close of my term this year." Hayden recommended long-term aide Roy Elson to succeed him. Elson lost his election bid to former Senator Barry Goldwater.

Following his retirement from Congress, Hayden returned to Tempe and set up an office in Arizona State University's Charles Trumbull Hayden library. In addition to organizing the papers he collected during his career, he also wrote a biography of his father and worked on a project documenting the lives of Arizona's pioneers. He became ill in the middle of January 1972 and died on January 25, 1972. He was buried in Tempe's Double Butte Cemetery. Speakers at Hayden's memorial service included Goldwater and former President Lyndon B. Johnson.

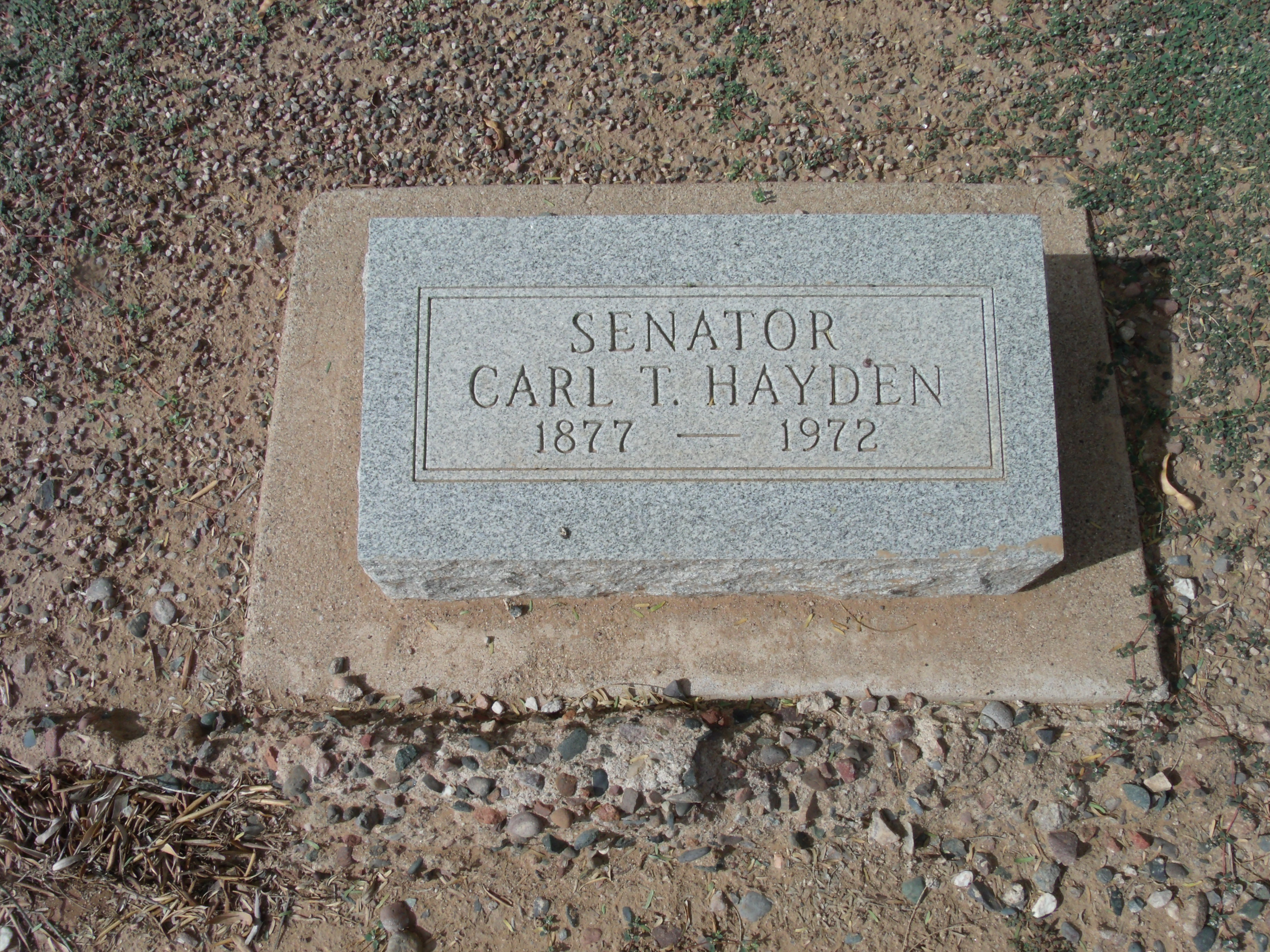
The grave site of Carl T. Hayden; Sec. B-53 in Double Butte Cemetery.

In response to his long tenure in Congress, multiple projects have been named after him. On September 29, 1957, Phoenix Union High School District dedicated Carl Hayden High School. This was followed by the Maricopa County Democratic Committee lobbying for Glen Canyon Dam to be named Hayden Dam, a move that Hayden personally opposed. In 1969, the visitor center overlooking Glen Canyon Dam was named after the long-term senator. Naming efforts even continued after Hayden's death with the US Department of Agriculture's Carl Hayden Bee Research Center being named in 1978 followed by the U.S. Department of Veterans Affairs' Carl T. Hayden VA Medical Center in 1987. The Hayden-Rhodes aqueduct was named after Carl Hayden upon its completion in 1985 due to his involvement in the legislation that created it. A bust of Hayden was added to the Senate sculpture collection and placed in the Russell Senate Office Building in 1986. A bust of Hayden also sits outside just north of the Arizona State Capitol.

== Congressional elections results ==
1911 Election for U.S. Representative of Arizona's at-large district
Party	Candidate	Votes	%
Democratic	Carl Hayden	11,556	54.05
Republican	John S. Williams	8,485	39.69
Socialist	John Halberg	1,252	5.86

1912 Election for U.S. Representative of Arizona's at-large district
Party	Candidate	Votes	%
Democratic	Carl Hayden (incumbent)	11,389	48.37
Progressive	Robert S. Fisher	5,819	24.71
Republican	Thomas Edward Campbell	3,110	13.21

1914 Election for U.S. Representative of Arizona's at-large district
Party	Candidate	Votes	%
Democratic	Carl Hayden (incumbent)	33,306	74.57
Republican	Henry L. Eads	7,586	16.98

1916 Election for U.S. Representative of Arizona's at-large district
Party	Candidate	Votes	%
Democratic	Carl Hayden	34,377	69.75
Republican	Thomas Maddock	14,907	30.25

1918 Election for U.S. Representative of Arizona's at-large district
Party	Candidate	Votes	%
Democratic	Carl Hayden (incumbent)	26,805	61.43
Republican	John S. Williams	16,827	38.57

1920 Election for U.S. Representative of Arizona's at-large district
Party	Candidate	Votes	%
Democratic	Carl Hayden (incumbent)	35,397	57.8
Republican	James A. Dunseath	25,841	42.2

1922 Election for U.S. Representative of Arizona's at-large district
Party	Candidate	Votes	%
Democratic	Carl Hayden (incumbent)	45,121	75.6
Republican	Emma M. Guild	14,601	24.4

1924 Election for U.S. Representative of Arizona's at-large district
Party	Candidate	Votes	%
Democratic	Carl Hayden (incumbent)	40,329	82.3
Republican	W. J. Galbraith	8,628	17.6

1926 U.S. Senate election in Arizona
Primary election
Party	Candidate	Votes	%
Democratic	Carl Hayden	36,745	80.33
Democratic	Charles H. Rutherford	8,995	19.67
Total votes		45,740	100.00
General election
Democratic	Carl Hayden	44,591	58.34
Republican	Ralph H. Cameron (incumbent)	31,845	41.66
Total votes		76,436	100.00
Democratic gain from Republican			

1932 U.S. Senate election in Arizona
Primary election
Party	Candidate	Votes	%
Democratic	Carl Hayden (incumbent)	38,924	48.45
Democratic	Harlow W. Akers	30,802	38.34
Democratic	William J. Fellows	6,449	8.03
Democratic	Walter H. Colyar	4,161	5.18
Total votes		80,336	100.00
General election
Democratic	Carl Hayden (incumbent)	74,310	66.67
Republican	Ralph H. Cameron	35,737	32.06
Socialist	Lester B. Woolever	1,110	1.00
Communist	Edward Haustgen	306	0.27
Total votes		111,463	100.00
Democratic hold			

1938 U.S. Senate election in Arizona
Primary election
Party	Candidate	Votes	%
Democratic	Carl Hayden (incumbent)	68,328	65.48
Democratic	Robert E. Miller	22,154	21.23
Democratic	Whit I. Hughes	13,867	13.29
Total votes		104,349	100.00
General election
Democratic	Carl Hayden (incumbent)	82,714	76.52
Republican	Burt H. Clingan	25,378	23.48
Total votes		108,092	100.00
Democratic hold			

1944 U.S. Senate election in Arizona
Primary election
Party	Candidate	Votes	%
Democratic	Carl Hayden (incumbent)	48,812	64.54
Democratic	Joe Conway	22,764	30.1
Democratic	Henderson Stockton	4,059	5.37
Total votes		75,635	100.00
General election
Democratic	Carl Hayden (incumbent)	90,335	63.97
Republican	Fred Wildon Fickett Jr.	39,891	30.63
Total votes		130,226	100.00
Democratic hold			

1950 U.S. Senate election in Arizona
Primary election
Party	Candidate	Votes	%
Democratic	Carl Hayden (incumbent)	95,544	70.97
Democratic	Cecil H. Miller	24,340	18.08
Democratic	Robert E. Miller	14,752	10.96
Total votes		134,636	100.00
General election
Democratic	Carl Hayden (incumbent)	116,246	62.80
Republican	Bruce Brockett	68,846	37.20
Total votes		185,092	100.00
Democratic hold			

1956 U.S. Senate election in Arizona
Primary election
Party	Candidate	Votes	%
Democratic	Carl Hayden (incumbent)	99,859	82.4
Democratic	Robert E. Miller	21,370	17.6
Total votes		121,229	100.00
General election
Democratic	Carl Hayden (incumbent)	170,816	61.39
Republican	Ross F. Jones	107,447	38.61
Total votes		278,263	100.00
Democratic hold			

1962 U.S. Senate election in Arizona
Primary election
Party	Candidate	Votes	%
Democratic	Carl Hayden (incumbent)	117,688	76.5
Democratic	W. Lee McLane	36,158	23.5
Total votes		153,846	100.00
General election
Democratic	Carl Hayden (incumbent)	199,217	54.94
Republican	Evan Mecham	163,388	45.06
Total votes		362,605	100.00
Democratic hold			

== Works cited ==
- August, Jack L. Jr. (1999). Vision in the Desert: Carl Hayden and Hydropolitics in the American Southwest, introduction by Bruce Babbitt, Fort Worth: Texas Christian University Press. ISBN 0875653103.
- Johnson, James W. (2002). Arizona Politicians: The Noble and the Notorious, illustrations by David 'Fitz' Fitzsimmons, Tucson: University of Arizona Press. ISBN 0816522030.
- Rice, Ross R. (1994). Carl Hayden: Builder of the American West. Lanham, MD: University Press of America. ISBN 0819193992.

U.S. House of Representatives
Preceded by Ralph H. Cameron as U.S. Delegate from the Arizona Territory	Member of the U.S. House of Representatives from Arizona's at-large congressional district 1912–1927	Succeeded by Lewis W. Douglas
Party political offices
Preceded by Marcus A. Smith	Democratic nominee for U.S. Senator from Arizona (Class 3); 1926, 1932, 1938, 1944, 1950, 1956, 1962	Succeeded by Roy Elson
U.S. Senate
Preceded by Ralph H. Cameron	U.S. Senator (Class 3) from Arizona; 1927–1969; Served alongside: Henry F. Ashurst, Ernest McFarland, Barry Goldwater, Paul Fannin	Succeeded by Barry Goldwater
Preceded by George H. Moses	Chair of the Senate Printing Committee; 1933–1947	Position abolished
Preceded by C. Wayland Brooks	Ranking Member of the Senate Rules Committee; 1947–1949	Succeeded by William E. Jenner
Preceded by C. Wayland Brooks	Chair of the Senate Rules Committee; 1949–1953	Succeeded by William E. Jenner
Preceded by Alben W. Barkley	Chair of the Joint Inaugural Ceremonies Committee; 1949–1953	Succeeded by Styles Bridges
Preceded by Styles Bridges	Ranking Member of the Senate Appropriations Committee; 1953–1955	Succeeded by Styles Bridges
Preceded by Styles Bridges	Chair of the Senate Appropriations Committee; 1955–1969	Succeeded by Richard Russell Jr.
Preceded by Walter F. George	President pro tempore of the U.S. Senate; 1957–1969; On leave: 1963–1969	Succeeded by Richard Russell Jr.
Honorary titles
Preceded by Walter F. George	Dean of the U.S. Senate; 1957–1969	Succeeded by Richard Russell Jr.
Preceded by Walter F. George	Most senior Democrat in the U.S. Senate; 1957–1969	Succeeded by Richard Russell Jr.
