= 1944 United States Senate election in Arizona =

- November 7, 1944
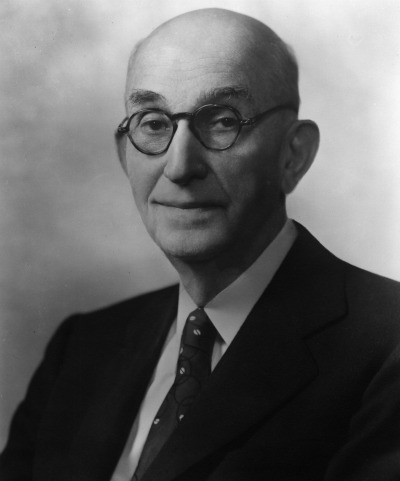

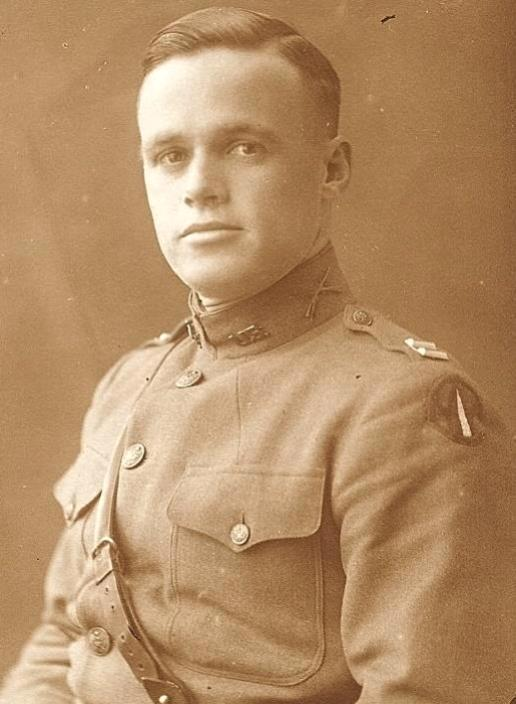
Nominee	Carl Hayden	Fred Wildon Fickett Jr.
Party	Democratic	Republican
Popular vote	90,335	39,891
Percentage	69.37%	30.63%
- County results Hayden: 60–70% 70–80% 80–90%
U.S. senator before election
Carl Hayden
Democratic
Elected U.S. Senator
Carl Hayden
Democratic

The 1944 United States Senate election in Arizona took place on November 7, 1944. Incumbent Democratic U.S. Senator Carl Hayden ran for reelection to a fourth term, defeating Republican nominee Fred Wildon Fickett Jr., in the general election.

== Democratic primary ==
=== Candidates ===
- Carl T. Hayden, incumbent U.S. Senator
- Joe Conway, Attorney General of Arizona
- Henderson Stockton, candidate for U.S. Senate in 1940

=== Results ===
Democratic primary results
Party	Candidate	Votes	%
Democratic	Carl T. Hayden (incumbent)	48,812	64.54%
Democratic	Joe Conway	22,764	30.10%
Democratic	Henderson Stockton	4,059	5.37%
Total votes		75,635	100.00

== Republican primary ==
=== Candidates ===
- Fred Wildon Fickett Jr.

== General election ==
United States Senate election in Arizona, 1944
Party	Candidate	Votes	%	±%
Democratic	Carl T. Hayden (incumbent)	90,335	69.37%	−7.15%
Republican	Fred Wildon Fickett Jr.	39,891	30.63%	+7.15%
Majority		50,444	38.74%	−14.30%
Turnout		130,226		
Democratic hold		Swing		

== See also ==
- United States Senate elections, 1944
