= 1938 United States Senate election in Arizona =

- November 3, 1938
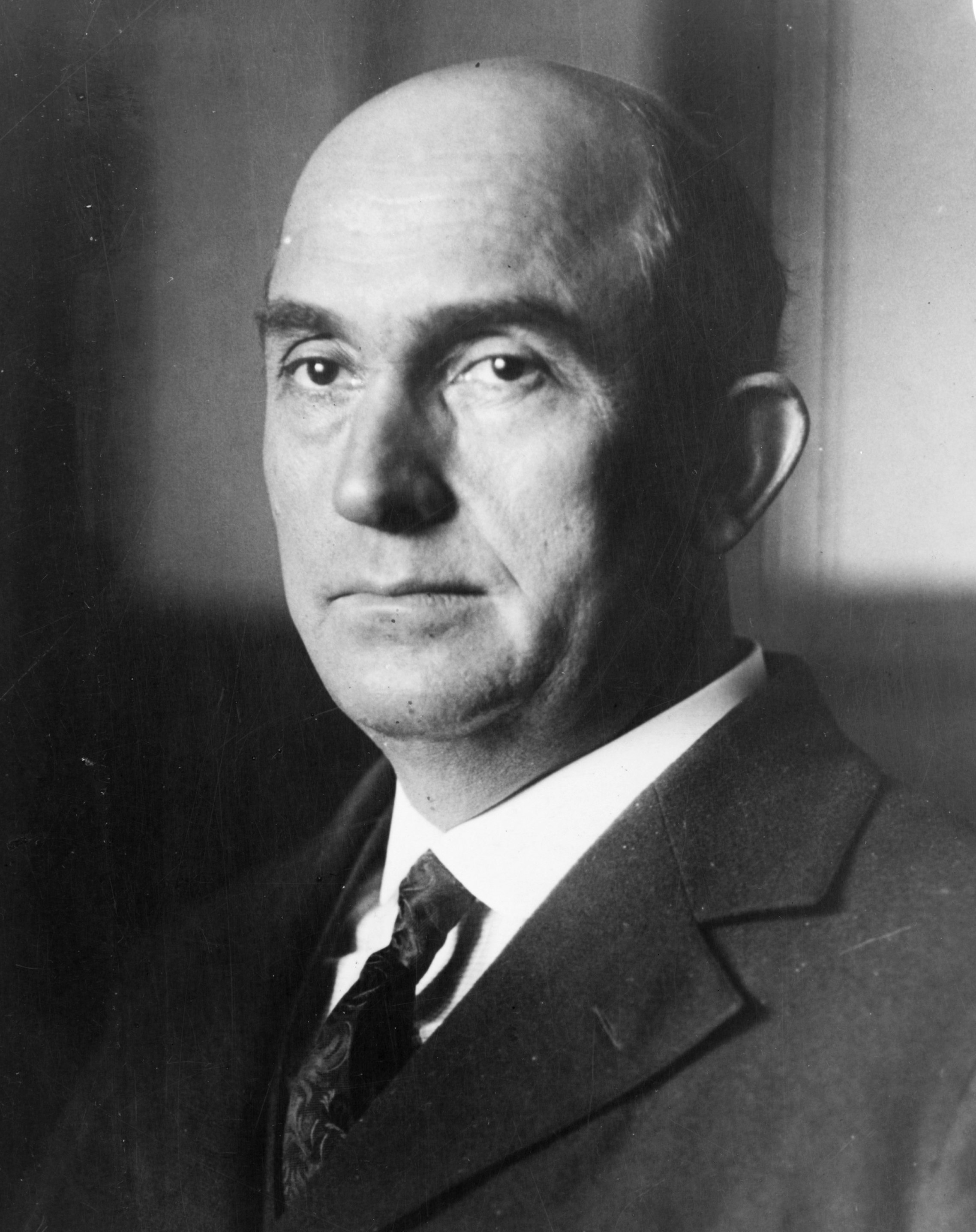

Nominee	Carl Hayden	Burt H. Clingan
Party	Democratic	Republican
Popular vote	82,714	25,378
Percentage	76.52%	23.48%
- County results Hayden: 70–80% 80–90% >90%
U.S. senator before election
Carl Hayden
Democratic
Elected U.S. Senator
Carl Hayden
Democratic

The 1938 United States Senate elections in Arizona took place on November 3, 1938. Incumbent Democratic U.S. Senator Carl Hayden ran for reelection to a third term, defeating Republican nominee Burt H. Clingan in the general election.

In contrast to previous elections, Hayden was easily reelected, receiving only token opposition from a relatively unknown Republican challenger.

== Democratic primary ==
=== Candidates ===
- Carl T. Hayden, incumbent U.S. Senator
- Robert E. Miller
- Whit I. Hughes

=== Results ===
Democratic primary results
Party	Candidate	Votes	%
Democratic	Carl T. Hayden (incumbent)	68,328	65.48%
Democratic	Robert E. Miller	22,154	21.23%
Democratic	Whit I. Hughes	13,867	13.29%
Total votes		104,349	100.00

== Republican primary ==
=== Candidates ===
- Burt H. Clingan, chairman of the Arizona Industrial Commission

== General election ==
United States Senate election in Arizona, 1938
Party	Candidate	Votes	%	±%
Democratic	Carl T. Hayden (incumbent)	82,714	76.52%	+9.85%
Republican	Burt H. Clingan	25,378	23.48%	−8.58%
Majority		57,336	53.04%	+18.43%
Turnout		108,092		
Democratic hold		Swing		

== See also ==
- United States Senate elections, 1938
