= 1911 United States House of Representatives election in Arizona =

1911 United States House of Representatives elections in Arizona
- December 12, 1911
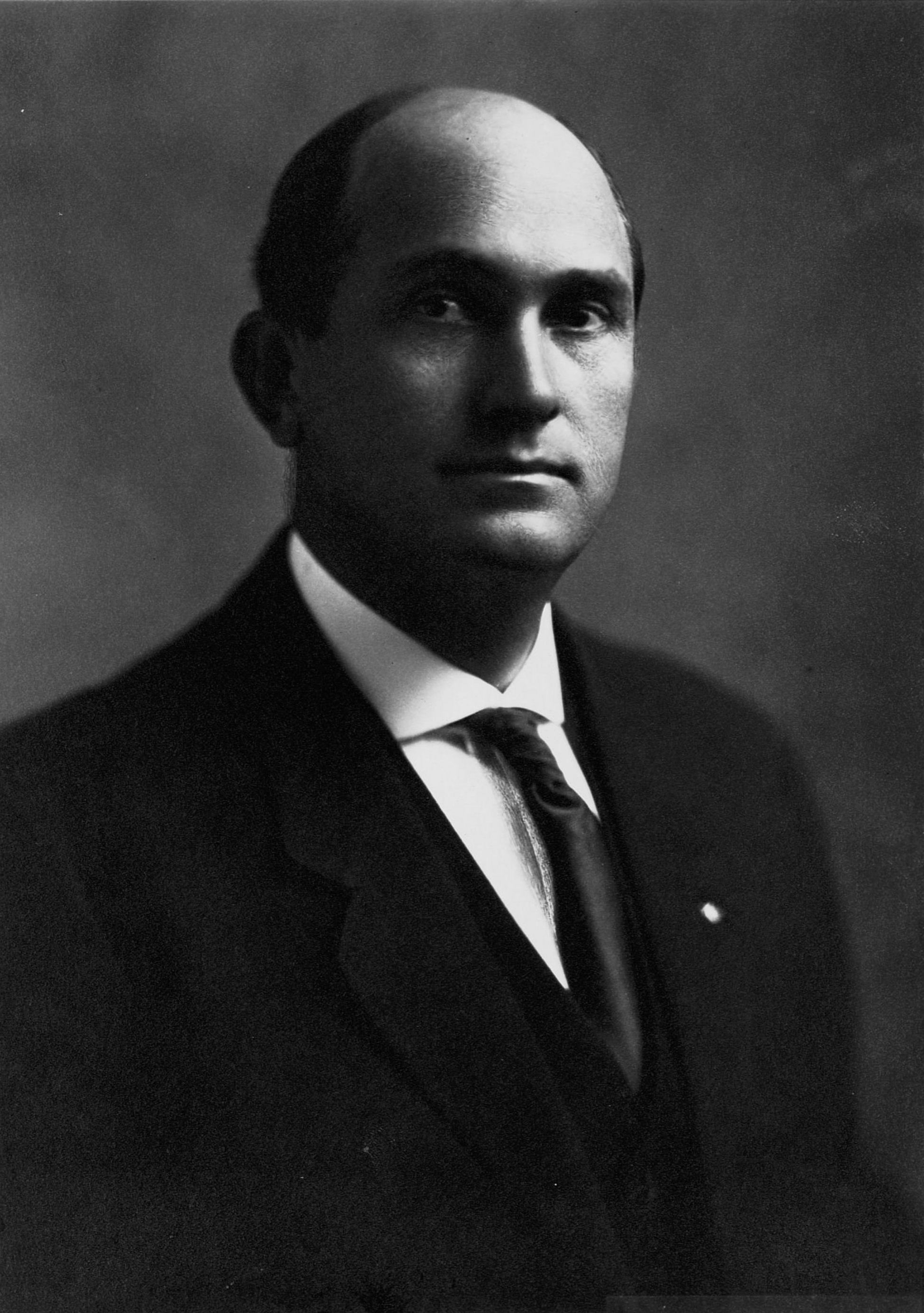

| Nominee | Carl Hayden | John S. Williams | John Halberg |
| Party | Democratic | Republican | Socialist |
| Popular vote | 11,556 | 8,485 | 1,252 |
| Percentage | 54.05% | 39.69% | 5.86% |
- County results Hayden: 50–60% 60–70% Williams: 40–50% 50–60%
Elected Representative
At-large
Carl Hayden
Democratic

The 1911 United States House of Representatives elections in Arizona was held on Tuesday December 12, 1911 to elect the states at-large representative. Representative of Arizona's non-voting delegate Ralph H. Cameron decided not to run.

Democratic nominee Carl Hayden won his party's primary on October 4, 1911, by 1,552 votes. He won the general election over Republican John S. Williams and socialist candidate John Halberg with 54.05% of the vote.

== Democratic primary ==
Democratic primary results
| Party | Candidate | Votes | % |
|---|---|---|---|
| Democratic | Carl Hayden | 4,237 | 44.21% |
| Democratic | Hulford Winsor | 2,685 | 28.02% |
| Democratic | Lamar Cobb | 2,662 | 27.77% |
| Total votes | | 9,584 | 100.00 |

== Republican primary ==
Republican primary results
| Party | Candidate | Votes | % |
|---|---|---|---|
| Republican | John S. Williams | 4,578 | 100.00% |
| Total votes | | 4,578 | 100.00 |

== General Election ==
Arizona At-large congressional district election, 1911
| Party | Candidate | Votes | % |
|---|---|---|---|
| Democratic | Carl Hayden | 11,556 | 54.05% |
| Republican | John S. Williams | 8,485 | 39.69% |
| Socialist | John Halberg | 1,252 | 5.86% |
| Prohibition | Eugene W. Chafin | 88 | 0.41% |
| Total votes | | 21,381 | 100.00 |
