= 1912 United States Senate elections in Arizona =

The 1912 United States Senate elections in Arizona took place in the Arizona State Legislature on March 27, 1912, confirming the selection of Marcus A. Smith and Henry F. Ashurst as the state's first U.S. Senators. Their results were predetermined on the basis on the results of a popular vote taken on December 12, 1911.

This marked the first U.S. Senate elections held in the state after it was admitted to the union as the 48th state on February 14, 1912. The two men were sworn in on April 2.

The Seventeenth Amendment to the United States Constitution established the direct election of United States senators in each state. The amendment supersedes Article I, §3, Clauses 1 and 2 of the Constitution, under which senators were elected by state legislatures. The amendment was proposed by the 62nd Congress in 1912 and became part of the Constitution on April 8, 1913, on ratification by three-quarters (36) of the state legislatures.

== Class 1 ==
1912 United States Senate election in Arizona (Class 1)
- December 12, 1911
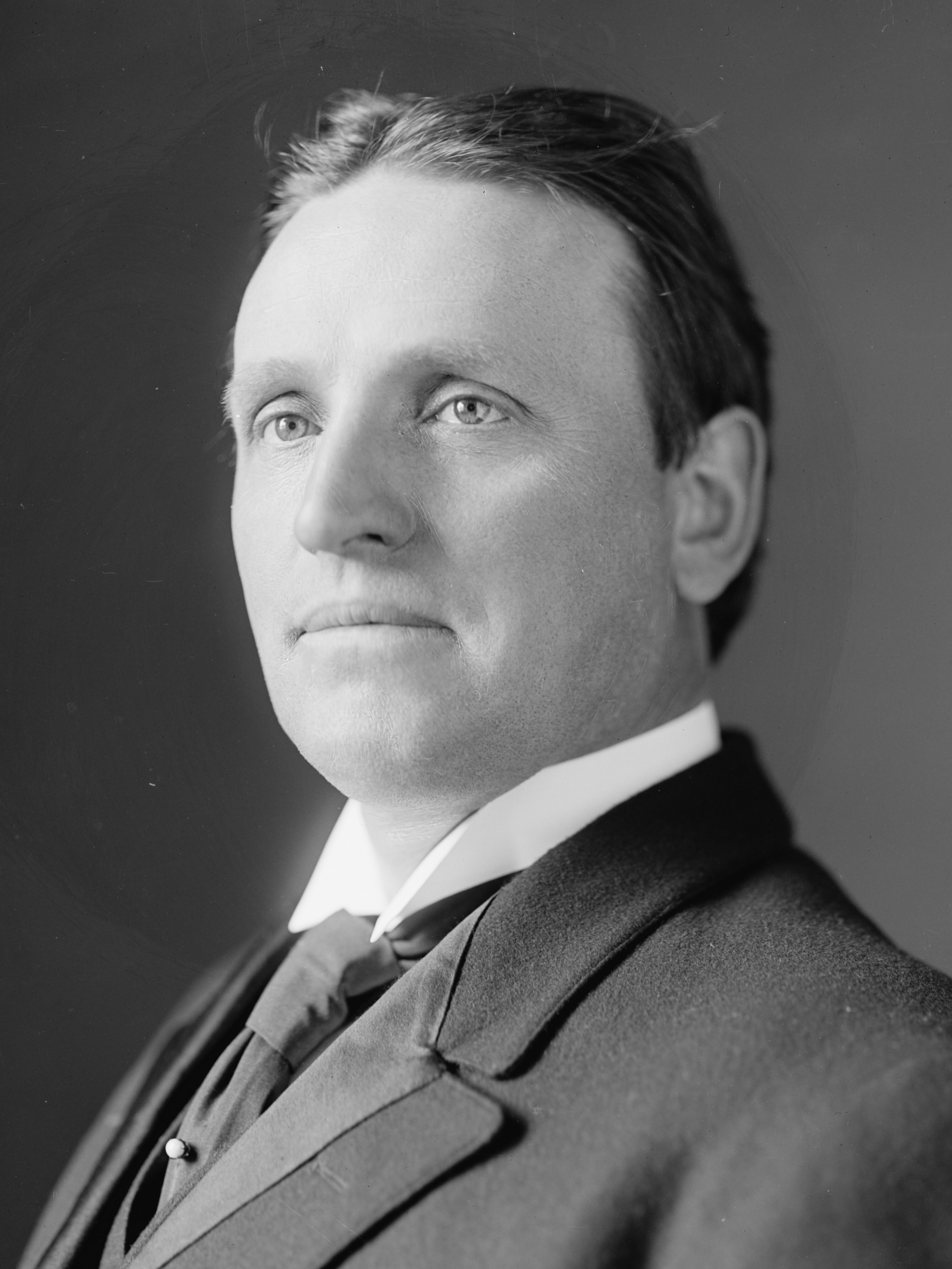

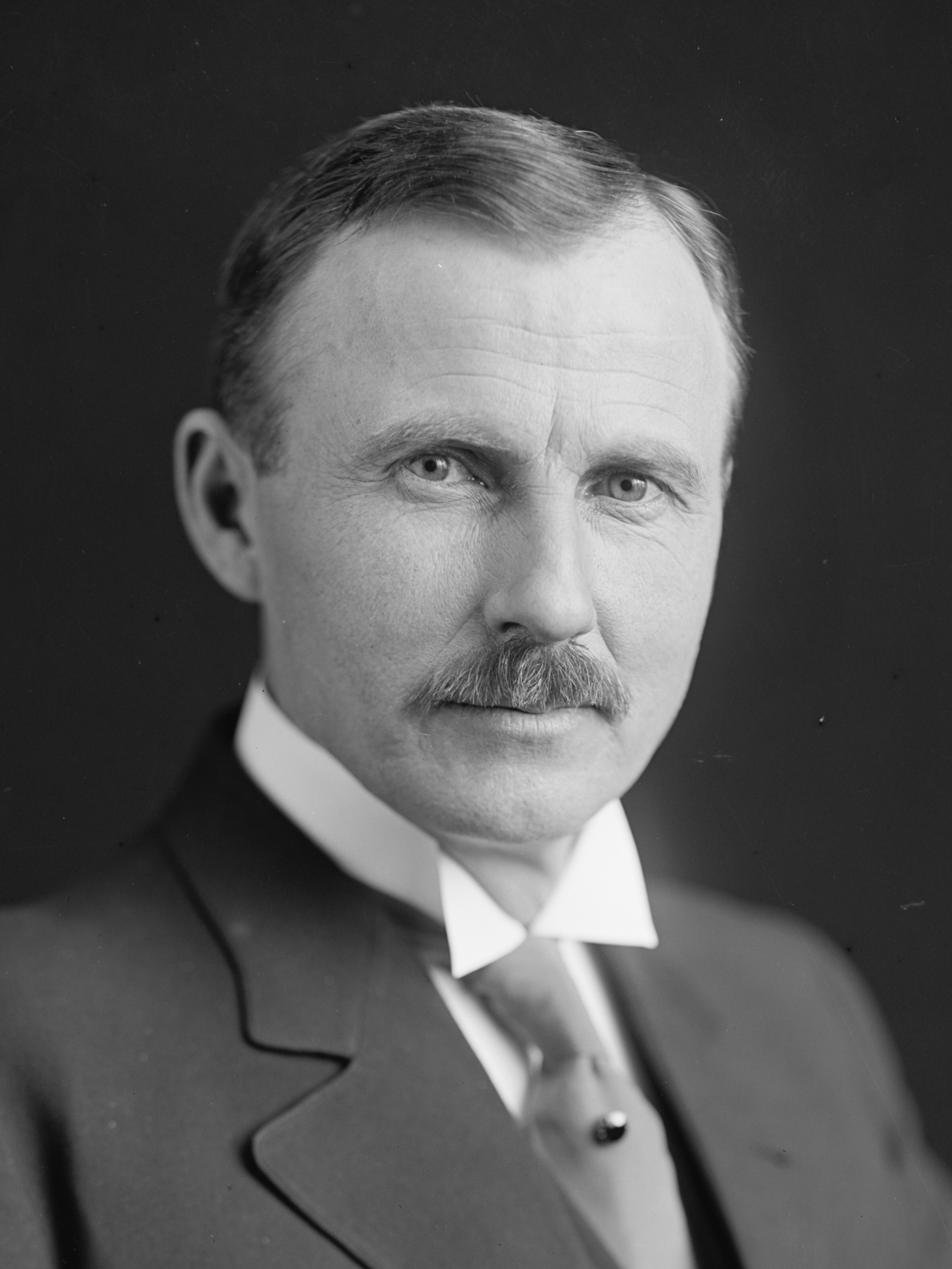

Nominee	Henry F. Ashurst	Ralph H. Cameron	E. Johnson
Party	Democratic	Republican	Socialist
Electoral vote	54	0	0
Popular vote	10,872	9,640	1,234
Percentage	49.99%	44.33%	5.68%
- Election results by county Ashurst: 40–50% 50–60% Cameron: 50–60% 60–70%
Elected U.S. Senator
Henry F. Ashurst
Democratic

Henry F. Ashurst was elected to the Territorial House of Representatives in 1897. He was re-elected in 1899, and became the territory's youngest speaker. In 1902, he was elected to the Territorial Senate. In 1911, Ashurst presided over Arizona's constitutional convention. During the convention, he positioned himself for a U.S. Senate seat by avoiding the political fighting over various clauses in the constitution which damaged his rivals.

1912 United States Senate election in Arizona (Class 1)
Party	Candidate	Votes	%
Democratic	Henry F. Ashurst	10,872	49.99%
Republican	Ralph H. Cameron	9,640	44.33%
Socialist	E. Johnson	1,234	5.68%
Majority		1,232	5.66%
Turnout		21,746	
Democratic win (new seat)			

== Class 3 ==
1912 United States Senate election in Arizona (Class 3)
- December 12, 1911
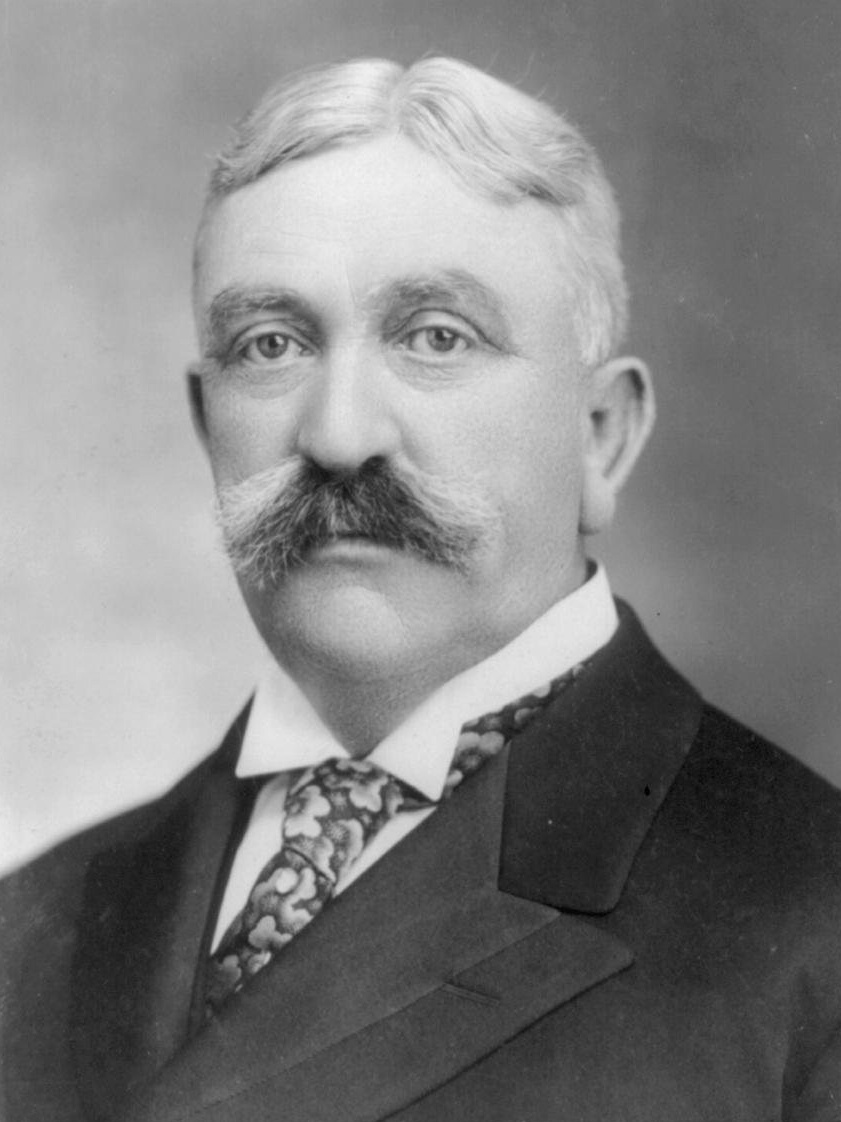

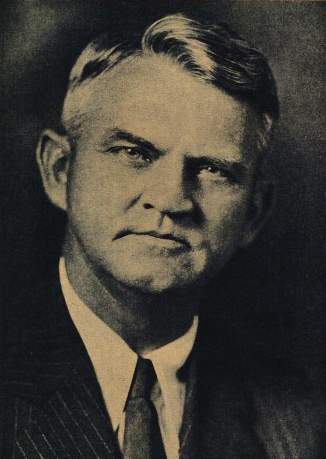

Nominee	Marcus A. Smith	Hoval A. Smith	E. B. Simonton
Party	Democratic	Republican	Socialist
Electoral vote	54	0	0
Popular vote	10,598	9,228	1,221
Percentage	50.35%	43.85%	5.80%
- Election results by county Smith: 40–50% 50–60% Smith: 40–50% 50–60%
Elected U.S. Senator
Marcus A. Smith
Democratic

Marcus A. Smith announced his candidacy for one of Arizona's two senate seats on September 24, 1911. As the campaign began, Smith abandoned his long standing conservative stand and declared himself a "Progressive".

1912 United States Senate election in Arizona (Class 3)
Party	Candidate	Votes	%
Democratic	Marcus A. Smith	10,598	50.35%
Republican	Hoval A. Smith	9,228	43.85%
Socialist	E. B. Simonton	1,221	5.80%
Majority		1,370	6.50%
Turnout		21,047	
Democratic win (new seat)			

== See also ==
- 1911 United States House of Representatives election in Arizona
- 1912–13 United States Senate elections

== Sources ==
- Fazio, Steven A. (Spring 1970). "Marcus Aurelius Smith: Arizona Delegate and Senator". Arizona and the West. 12 (1): 23–62. JSTOR 40168029.
- Goff, John S. (1985). Arizona Territorial Officials Volume III: The Delegates to Congress 1863-1912. Cave Creek, Arizona: Black Mountain Press. OCLC 12559708.
- Goff, John S. (1989). Marcus A. Smith. Arizona biographical series. Vol. v. 5. Cave Creek, Arizona: Black Mountain Press. OCLC 21013345.
