= Grand Canyon National Park Act =

1919 U.S. federal law establishing Grand Canyon National Park

- Long title: An Act To establish the Grand Canyon National Park in the State of Arizona.
- Enacted by: the 65th United States Congress

Legislative history
- Introduced in the House as S. 390; Signed into law by President Woodrow Wilson on February 26, 1919

The Grand Canyon National Park Act, 65th Congress, was the U.S. federal law that established Grand Canyon National Park as the nation's seventeenth national park. It was signed into law on February 26, 1919, by President Woodrow Wilson.

== See also ==
- List of national parks of the United States
- National Park Service
- United States Department of the Interior
