= 1968 Republican Party presidential primaries =

Selection of Republican US presidential candidate

1968 Republican presidential primaries
- February 3 to July 13, 1968

1,333 delegates to the Republican National Convention 667 (majority) votes needed to win

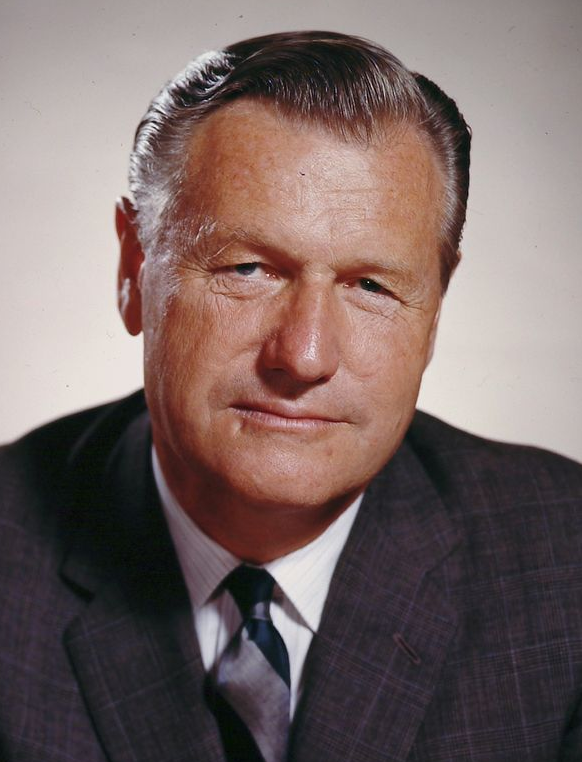

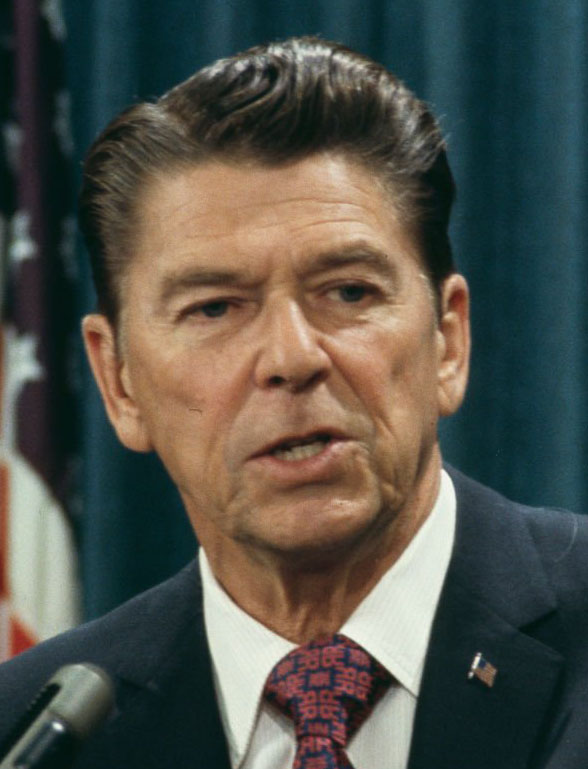
Candidate	Richard Nixon	Nelson Rockefeller	Ronald Reagan
Home state	California (Note: Nixon's official state of residence was New York because he moved there to practice law after his defeat in the 1962 California gubernatorial election. During his first term as president, Nixon re-established his residency in California. Consequently, most reliable reference books, including the January 6, 1969 edition of the Congressional Record, list his home state as New York.)	New York	California
Delegate count	619	267	192
Contests won	10	2	1
Popular vote	1,679,443	164,340	1,696,632
Percentage	37.5%	3.7%	37.9%
- Nixon Rockefeller Reagan; Romney Favorite Sons (Note: Favorite sons received the support of Alaska (Wally Hickel), Hawaii (Hiram Fong), New Jersey (Clifford Case), South Carolina (Strom Thurmond), Ohio (Jim Rhodes), Pennsylvania (Raymond Shafer), Maryland (Spiro Agnew), Texas (John Tower), Kansas (Frank Carlson), and Tennessee (Howard Baker).) Uncommitted
Previous Republican nominee
Barry Goldwater
Republican nominee
Richard Nixon

From February 3 to July 13, 1968, voters of the Republican Party chose its nominee for president in the 1968 United States presidential election. Former Vice President Richard Nixon was selected as the nominee through a series of primary elections and caucuses culminating in the 1968 Republican National Convention held from August 5 to August 8, 1968, in Miami Beach, Florida.

== Schedule and results ==
=== 1968 Republican primaries and state conventions ===
Note: (Note: This should not be taken as a finalized list of results. While a significant amount of research was done, there were a number of Delegates who were not bound by the instruction, or "Pledged" to a candidate, though an attempt has been made to display their initial preferences. Some states also held primaries for the delegate positions, and these on occasion were where slates or candidates pledge to a certain candidate might be elected; however, as these elections allowed for a single person to vote for multiple candidates, as many as the number of positions being filled, it is difficult to determine how many people actually voted in these primaries. For this reason, while the results of some are in the table, they are not included in the popular vote summaries at the bottom of the table. Also information on Puerto Rico and the Virgin Islands, who elected five and three delegates respectively to the Republican Convention, was not found.)

Date (daily totals)	Contest	Total pledged delegates								
Date (daily totals)	Contest	Total pledged delegates	Delegates won and popular vote							
Date (daily totals)	Contest	Total pledged delegates	Richard Nixon	Nelson Rockefeller	Ronald Reagan	George Romney	Favorite Sons	Harold Stassen	Others	Uncommitted
February 3	Pennsylvania; State Committee	10 (of 64)	-	-	-	-	10 Del. (Note: Committed to Governor Raymond Shafer of Pennsylvania.)	-	-	-
February 10	Oklahoma; District Conventions	12 (of 22)	10 Del. (Note: Two delegates initially refused to commit to a candidate, but later backed Nixon.)	-	2 Del.	-	-	-	-	-
February 10	North Carolina; District Conventions (Note: Only six of eleven districts held conventions on this date.)	12 (of 26)	10 Del.	-	-	-	-	-	-	2 Del.
February 18	North Carolina; District Conventions (Note: Only five of eleven districts held conventions on this date.)	10 (of 26)	5 Del.	-	-	-	-	-	-	5 Del.
February 24	Oklahoma; State Convention	10 (of 22)	7 Del.	-	3 Del.	-	0 Del. (Note: A resolution was passed endorsing Governor Dewey Bartlett as a favorite-son, but he withdrew himself from consideration.)	-	-	-
March 2	North Carolina; State Convention	4 (of 26)	-	-	-	-	-	-	-	4 Del.
March 2	Tennessee; 5th District Convention	2 (of 28)	-	-	-	-	2 Del. (Note: Committed to Senator Howard Baker of Tennessee.)	-	-	-
March 9	Kansas; 4th District Convention	2 (of 20)	-	-	-	-	2 Del. (Note: Committed to Senator Frank Carlson of Kansas.)	-	-	-
March 12	New Hampshire; Primary; 103,938	8 (of 8)	8 Del. 80,666 (77.61%)	11,241 WI (10.82%)	362 WI (0.35%)	1,743 (1.68%)	-	429 (0.41%)	9,497 WI (Note: Includes 5,511 Write-In votes (5.30%) for Eugene McCarthy, 1,778 Write-In votes (1.71%) for Lyndon Johnson, 527 votes (0.51%) for Willis Stone, 374 Write-In votes (5.30%) for Paul Fisher, and 247 Write-In votes (0.24%) for Herbert Hoover) (9.14%)	-
March 16	Kansas; 2nd District Convention	2 (of 20)	-	-	-	-	2 Del. (Note: Committed to Senator Frank Carlson of Kansas.)	-	-	-
March 16	Virginia; 1st District Convention	2 (of 24)	1 Del.	-	-	-	-	-	-	1 Del.
March 23	Kansas; 1st District Convention	2 (of 20)	-	-	-	-	2 Del. (Note: Committed to Senator Frank Carlson of Kansas.)	-	-	-
March 28	Tennessee; 9th District Convention (Note: The date is assumed; while scheduled for this date, it may have been interrupted by the Memphis Riots.)	2 (of 28)	-	-	-	-	2 Del. (Note: Committed to Senator Howard Baker of Tennessee.)	-	-	-
March 30	Kansas; 5th District Convention	2 (of 20)	-	-	-	-	2 Del. (Note: Committed to Senator Frank Carlson of Kansas.)	-	-	-
March 30	South Carolina; State Convention	22 (of 22)	-	-	-	-	22 Del. (Note: Committed to Senator Strom Thurmond of South Carolina.)	-	-	-
March 30	Tennessee; 3rd District Convention	2 (of 28)	-	-	-	-	2 Del. (Note: Committed to Senator Howard Baker of Tennessee.)	-	-	-
April 2	Wisconsin; Primary; 490,739	30 (of 30)	30 Del. 390,368 (79.55%)	7,995 WI (1.63%)	50,727 (10.34%)	2,087 WI (0.43%)	-	28,531 (5.81%)	4,268 WI (Note: Includes 585 Write-In votes (0.12%) for George Wallace and 301 Write-In votes (0.06%) for Robert Kennedy) (0.87%)	6,763 (1.38%)
April 4	Tennessee; 8th District Convention	2 (of 28)	-	-	-	-	2 Del. (Note: Committed to Senator Howard Baker of Tennessee.)	-	-	-
April 6	Kansas; 3rd District Convention	2 (of 20)	-	-	-	-	2 Del. (Note: Committed to Senator Frank Carlson of Kansas.)	-	-	-
April 6	Tennessee; 1st District Convention	2 (of 28)	-	-	-	-	2 Del. (Note: Committed to Senator Howard Baker of Tennessee.)	-	-	-
April 6	Virginia; 2nd and 4th District Conventions	4 (of 24)	2 Del.	-	-	-	-	-	-	2 Del.
April 13	Tennessee; 6th District Convention	2 (of 28)	-	-	-	-	2 Del. (Note: Committed to Senator Howard Baker of Tennessee.)	-	-	-
April 13	Virginia; 5th District Convention	2 (of 24)	2 Del.	-	-	-	-	-	-	-
April 15	Virginia; 3rd District Convention	2 (of 24)	2 Del.	-	-	-	-	-	-	-
April 16	Iowa; District Conventions	14 (of 24)	9 Del.	5 Del. (Note: This is an estimate, as no hard number was provided in the source.)	-	-	-	-	-	-
April 17	Iowa; State Convention	10 (of 26)	7 Del. (Note: The source claims that Nixon could call upon 16 of the 24 Iowa delegates; the estimate of 7 accounts for the minimum 9 elected in the District Conventions.)	-	-	-	-	-	-	3 Del.
April 19	Kentucky; District Conventions	14 (of 24)	-	-	-	-	-	-	-	14 Del. (Note: No poll was done on the delegation, so preferences are not known.)
April 20	Kentucky; State Convention	10 (of 24)	-	-	-	-	-	-	-	10 Del. (Note: No poll was done on the delegation, so preferences are not known.)
April 20	Minnesota; 6th District Convention	2 (of 26)	2 Del.	-	-	-	-	-	-	-
April 20	Virginia; 8th District Convention	2 (of 24)	2 Del.	-	-	-	-	-	-	-
April 23	Pennsylvania; Pres. Primary; 288,384	0 (of 64)	171,815 WI (59.58%)	52,915 WI (18.35%)	8,636 WI (3.00%)	-	-	-	55,018 WI (Note: Includes 18,800 Write-In votes (6.52%) for Eugene McCarthy, 13,290 Write-In votes (4.61%) for George Wallace, 10,431 Write-In votes (3.62%) for Robert Kennedy, 4,651 Write-In votes (1.61%) for Hubert Humphrey, 3,088 Write-In votes (1.07%) for Lyndon Johnson, and 1,271 Write-In votes (0.44%) for Raymond Shafer) (19.08%)	6,763 (1.38%)
April 23	Pennsylvania; Del. Primary	54 (of 64)	-	-	-	-	54 Del. (Note: Loosely Committed to Governor Raymond Shafer of Pennsylvania.)	-	-	-
April 26	Tennessee; 7th District Convention	2 (of 28)	-	-	-	-	2 Del. (Note: Committed to Senator Howard Baker of Tennessee.)	-	-	-
April 26	Virginia; 10th District Convention	2 (of 24)	1 Del.	1 Del.	-	-	-	-	-	-
April 27	Arizona; State Convention	16 (of 16)	13 Del.	-	-	-	-	-	-	3 Del.
April 27	Kansas; State Convention	10 (of 20)	-	-	-	-	10 Del. (Note: Committed to Senator Frank Carlson of Kansas.)	-	-	-
April 27	Michigan; State Convention	48 (of 48)	-	-	-	48 Del.	-	-	-	-
April 27	Minnesota; 3rd, 5th and 7th District Conventions	6 (of 26)	4 Del.	2 Del.	-	-	-	-	-	-
April 27	Nevada; State Convention	12 (of 12)	8 Del.	2 Del.	-	-	-	-	-	2 Del.
April 27	Tennessee; 2nd and 4th District Conventions	4 (of 28)	-	-	-	-	4 Del. (Note: Committed to Senator Howard Baker of Tennessee.)	-	-	-
April 27	Virginia; 7th District Convention	2 (of 24)	2 Del.	-	-	-	-	-	-	-
April 30	Delaware; State Convention	12 (of 12)	7 Del.	5 Del.	-	-	-	-	-	-
April 30	Massachusetts; Primary; 106,521	34 (of 34)	27,447 WI (25.77%)	34 Del. 31,964 WI (30.01%)	1,770 WI (1.66%)	49 WI (0.05%)	31,465 (Note: All votes for Governor John Volpe of Massachusetts.) (29.54%)	-	13,826 WI (Note: Includes 9,758 Write-In votes (9.16%) for Eugene McCarthy, 1,184 Write-In votes (1.11%) for Robert Kennedy, 828 Write-In votes (0.78%) for Hubert Humphrey, 297 Write-In votes (0.28%) for George Wallace, and 70 Write-In votes (0.07%) for Charles Percey) (12.98%)	-
May 4	Minnesota; 1st and 4th District Conventions	4 (of 26)	4 Del.	-	-	-	-	-	-	-
May 4	Virginia; State Convention	4 (of 24)	4 Del.	-	-	-	-	-	-	-
May 5	Georgia; State Convention	30 (Note: District Conventions were held the earlier on April 20; preferences are not known amongst those delegates, however.) (of 30)	23 Del.	1 Del.	6 Del.	-	-	-	-	-
May 7	Indiana; Primary; 508,362	26 (of 26)	26 Del. 508,362 (100.00%)	-	-	-	-	-	-	-
May 7	Ohio; Pres. Primary; 614,492	0 (of 58)	-	-	-	-	614,492 (Note: All votes for Governor James Rhodes of Ohio.) (100.00%)	-	-	-
May 7	Ohio; Del. Primary; 508,362	58 (of 58)	2 Del.	-	-	-	55 Del. (Note: Committed to Governor James Rhodes of Ohio.)	1 Del.	-	-
May 7	Washington, D.C. Primary; 13,430	9 (of 9)	9 Del. (Note: The local Nixon and Rockefeller campaigns ran a unified slate. The delegates were divided six to Nixon, three to Rockefeller); 12,102 (90.11%)		1,328 (Note: Nominally unpledged, the slate was reportedly for Reagan.) (9.89%)	-	-	-	-	-
May 11	Hawaii; State Convention	14 (of 14)	-	-	-	-	14 Del. (Note: Committed to Senator Hiram Fong of Hawaii.)	-	-	-
May 11	Maine; State Convention	12 (of 12)	4 Del.	6 Del.	-	-	-	-	-	4 Del.
May 11	Minnesota; 2nd and 8th District Conventions	4 (of 26)	4 Del.	-	-	-	-	-	-	-
May 11	Wyoming; State Convention	12 (of 12)	10 Del.	-	-	-	-	-	-	2 Del. (Note: Both favored either Rockefeller or Reagan.)
May 12	Alaska; State Convention	12 (of 12)	-	-	-	-	12 Del. (Note: Committed to Governor Walter Hickel of Alaska.)	-	-	-
May 14	Nebraska; Pres. Primary; 200,707	0 (of 10)	140,336 (69.92%)	10,225 WI (5.09%)	42,703 (21.28%)	40 WI (0.02%)	-	2,638 (1.31%)	4,765 WI (Note: Includes 1,544 Write-In votes (0.77%) for Eugene McCarthy, 1,302 votes (0.65%) for Americus Liberator, 885 Write-In votes (0.44%) for Robert Kennedy, 533 Write-In votes (0.27%) for George Wallace, 219 Write-In votes (0.11%) for Hubert Humphrey, 32 Write-In votes (0.02%) for John Lindsay, and 19 Write-In votes (0.01%) for Lyndon Johnson.) (2.37%)	-
May 14	Nebraska; Del. Primary	16 (of 16)	15 Del.	-	-	-	-	-	-	1 Del.
May 14	West Virginia; Del. Primary	14 (of 14)	7 Del.	1 Del.	-	-	-	-	-	6 Del.
May 15	Missouri; 3rd District Convention	2 (of 24)	2 Del.	-	-	-	-	-	-	-
May 15	Rhode Island; State Convention	14 (of 14)	-	14 Del. (Note: Nominally uncommitted, the delegates were reportedly solidly behind Rockefeller)	-	-	-	-	-	-
May 17	Missouri; 6th District Convention	2 (of 24)	2 Del.	-	-	-	-	-	-	-
May 18	Missouri; 2nd District Convention	2 (of 24)	1 Del.	-	-	-	-	-	-	1 Del.
May 18	Vermont; State Convention	12 (of 12)	9 Del.	2 Del.	-	-	-	-	-	1 Del.
May 22	Louisiana; 8th District Convention	2 (of 26)	2 Del.	-	-	-	-	-	-	-
May 22	Missouri; 1st District Convention	2 (of 24)	2 Del.	-	-	-	-	-	-	-
May 23	Louisiana; 5th District Convention	2 (of 26)	-	-	2 Del.	-	-	-	-	-
May 25	Colorado; 1st District Convention	2 (of 18)	1 Del.	-	1 Del.	-	-	-	-	-
May 25	Louisiana; 4th and 6th District Conventions	4 (of 26)	4 Del. (Note: In the 4th District there was a resolution passed advocating for the nomination of Charlton Lyons, the '64 Republican nominee for Governor, as a Favorite Son for the Louisiana delegation.)	-	-	-	-	-	-	-
May 25	Missouri; 4th, 9th and 10th District Convention	6 (of 24)	6 Del.	-	-	-	-	-	-	-
May 25	Tennessee; State Convention	10 (of 28)	10 Del.	-	-	-	-	-	-	-
May 26	Louisiana; 3rd District Convention	2 (of 26)	-	-	2 Del.	-	-	-	-	-
May 28	Florida; Primary; 51,509	36 (of 36)	-	-	-	-	-	-	-	36 Del. 51,509 (100.00%)
May 28	Louisiana; 7th District Convention	2 (of 26)	-	-	-	-	-	-	-	2 Del. (Note: Preferences are not known.)
May 28	Missouri; 5th District Convention	2 (of 24)	2 Del.	-	-	-	-	-	-	-
May 28	Oregon; Primary; 312,159	18 (of 18)	18 Del. 203,037 (65.04%)	36,305 WI (11.63%)	63,707 (20.41%)	-	-	-	9,110 WI (Note: Includes 7,387 Write-In votes (2.37%) for Eugene McCarthy, and 1,723 Write-In votes (0.55%) for Robert Kennedy.) (2.92%)	-
May 30	Louisiana; 1st and 2nd District Conventions (Note: The date is assumed from the source, as hard data on the 1st and 2nd District Conventions could not be found.)	4 (of 26)	4 Del.	-	-	-	-	-	-	-
June 1	Mississippi; State Convention	20 (of 20)	7 Del.	-	2 Del.	-	-	-	-	11 Del. (Note: Two delegates not polled are included here; seven delegates leaned towards either Nixon or Reagan equally.)
June 4	California; Primary; 1,525,091	86 (of 86)	-	-	86 Del. 1,525,091 (100.00%)	-	-	-	-	-
June 4	Colorado; 2nd District Convention	2 (of 18)	2 Del.	-	-	-	-	-	-	-
June 4	New Jersey; Pres. Primary; 88,592	0 (of 40)	71,809 WI (81.06%)	11,530 WI (13.02%)	2,737 WI (3.09%)	-	-	-	2,516 WI (Note: Includes 1,358 Write-In votes (1.53%) for Eugene McCarthy, 616 Write-In votes (0.70%) for George Wallace, 227 Write-In votes (0.26%) for Robert Kennedy, 145 Write-In votes (0.16%) for Hubert Humphrey, and 6 Write-In votes (0.01%) for Lyndon Johnson.) (2.84%)	-
June 4	New Jersey; Del. Primary	40 (of 40)	-	-	-	-	40 Del. (Note: Committed to Senator Clifford Case of New Jersey.)	-	-	-
June 4	South Dakota; Primary; 68,113	14 (of 14)	14 Del. 68,113 (100.00%)	-	-	-	-	-	-	-
June 7	Colorado; 3rd and 4th District Convention	4 (of 18)	4 Del.	-	-	-	-	-	-	-
June 7	Missouri; 8th District Convention	2 (of 24)	2 Del.	-	-	-	-	-	-	-
June 8	Colorado; State Convention	10 (of 18)	8 Del.	-	-	-	-	-	-	2 Del.
June 8	Missouri; 7th District Convention	2 (of 24)	2 Del.	-	-	-	-	-	-	-
June 11	Illinois; Pres. Primary; 22,403	0 (of 58)	17,490 WI (78.07%)	2,165 WI (9.66%)	1,601 WI (7.15%)	16 WI (0.07%)	-	-	1,131 WI (Note: Includes 586 Write-In votes (2.62%) for George Wallace, 162 Write-In votes (0.72%) for Eugene McCarthy, and 120 Write-In votes (0.54%) for Charles Percy.) (5.05%)	-
June 11	Illinois; Del. Primary	48 (of 58)	40 Del.	-	-	-	-	-	-	8 Del.
June 11	Texas; State Convention	56 (of 56)	-	-	-	-	56 Del. (Note: Committed to Senator John Tower of Texas.)	-	-	-
June 14	Minnesota; State Convention	4 (of 26)	3 Del.	7 Del.	-	-	-	-	-	-
June 14	North Dakota; State Convention	8 (of 8)	6 Del.	-	-	-	-	-	-	2 Del.
June 15	Connecticut; State Convention	16 (of 16)	3 Del.	13 Del. (Note: Nominally uncommitted, the delegates were reportedly behind Rockefeller)	-	-	-	-	-	-
June 15	Idaho; State Convention	14 (of 14)	8 Del.	-	6 Del.	-	-	-	-	-
June 18	New York; Del. Primary	82 (of 82)	4 Del.	78 Del.	-	-	-	-	-	-
June 22	Louisiana; State Convention	20 (of 30)	7 Del.	-	2 Del.	-	-	-	-	1 Del.
June 22	Maryland; State Convention	26 (of 26)	-	-	-	-	26 Del. (Note: Committed to Governor Spiro Agnew of Maryland.)	-	-	-
June 22	Montana; State Convention	14 (of 14)	13 Del.	-	1 Del.	-	-	-	-	-
June 22	New Mexico; State Convention	12 (of 12)	6 Del.	-	3 Del.	-	-	-	-	5 Del. (Note: Three were said to favor either Reagan or Nixon.)
June 22	Washington; State Convention	24 (of 24)	23 Del.	-	-	-	-	-	-	1 Del.
June 28	Alabama; District Conventions	16 (of 26)	7 Del.	-	2 Del.	-	-	-	-	7 Del. (Note: Two delegates were supportive of either Nixon or Reagan in opposition to Rockefeller; the other five were Uncommitted.)
June 29	Alabama; State Convention	10 (of 26)	-	-	-	-	-	-	-	10 Del.
June 29	Arkansas; State Convention	18 (of 18)	-	-	-	-	18 Del. (Note: Committed to Governor Winthrop Rockefeller of Arkansas.)	-	-	-
June 29	Illinois; State Convention	10 (of 58)	8 Del.	-	-	-	-	-	-	2 Del.
June 29	Missouri; State Convention	4 (of 24)	1 Del.	-	-	-	-	-	-	3 Del.
June 29	Virginia; 6th and 9th District Conventions	4 (of 24)	4 Del.	-	-	-	-	-	-	-
July 13	Utah; State Convention	8 (of 8)	3 Del.	-	5 Del.	-	-	-	-	-
1,333 delegates 4,473,551 votes			475 1,679,443 (37.54%)	174 164,340 (3.67%)	123 1,696,632 (37.93%)	48 4,447 (0.10%)	345 645,957 (14.44%)	1 31,655 (0.71%)	0 110,438 (2.47%)	151 140,639 (3.14%)
Suspected delegate count August 4, 1968			619 (46.44%)	267 (20.03%)	192 (14.40%)	48 (3.60%)	157 (11.78%)	-	-	50 (3.75%)

== Candidates ==
The following political leaders were candidates for the 1968 Republican presidential nomination:

=== Nominee ===
Candidate	Most recent office	Home state	Campaign Withdrawal date	Popular vote	Contests won	Running mate
Richard Nixon	Vice President of the United States (1953–1961)	California	(Campaign); Secured nomination: August 8, 1968	1,679,443 (37.5%)	10	Spiro Agnew

=== Other major candidates ===
These candidates participated in multiple state primaries or were included in multiple major national polls.

Candidate	Most recent office	Home state	Campaign Withdrawal date
Nelson Rockefeller	Governor of New York (1959–1973)	New York	(Campaign)
Ronald Reagan	Governor of California (1967–1975)	California	(Campaign); Accepted draft: August 5, 1968
George W. Romney	Governor of Michigan (1963–1969)	Michigan	(Campaign); Announced: Nov. 18, 1967; Withdrew: February 28, 1968
Harold Stassen	Director of the Foreign Operations Administration (1953–1955)	Pennsylvania	(Campaign)

=== Favorite sons ===
The following candidates ran only in their home state's primary, caucus, or convention. They ran for the purpose of controlling their state's respective delegate slate at the national convention and did not appear to be considered national candidates by the media. The media referred to them as "favorite son" candidates.

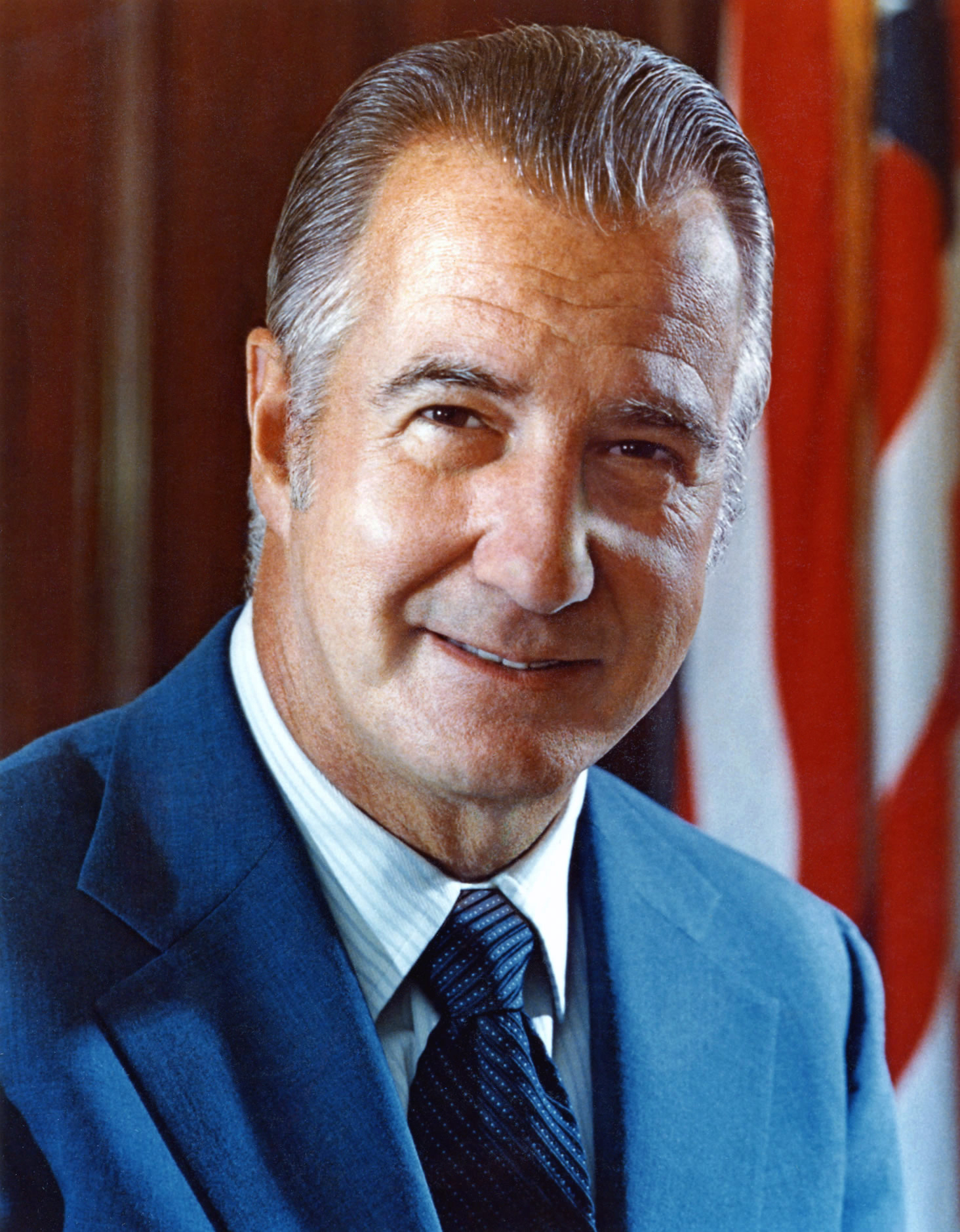
Governor Spiro Agnew of Maryland (endorsed Nixon)

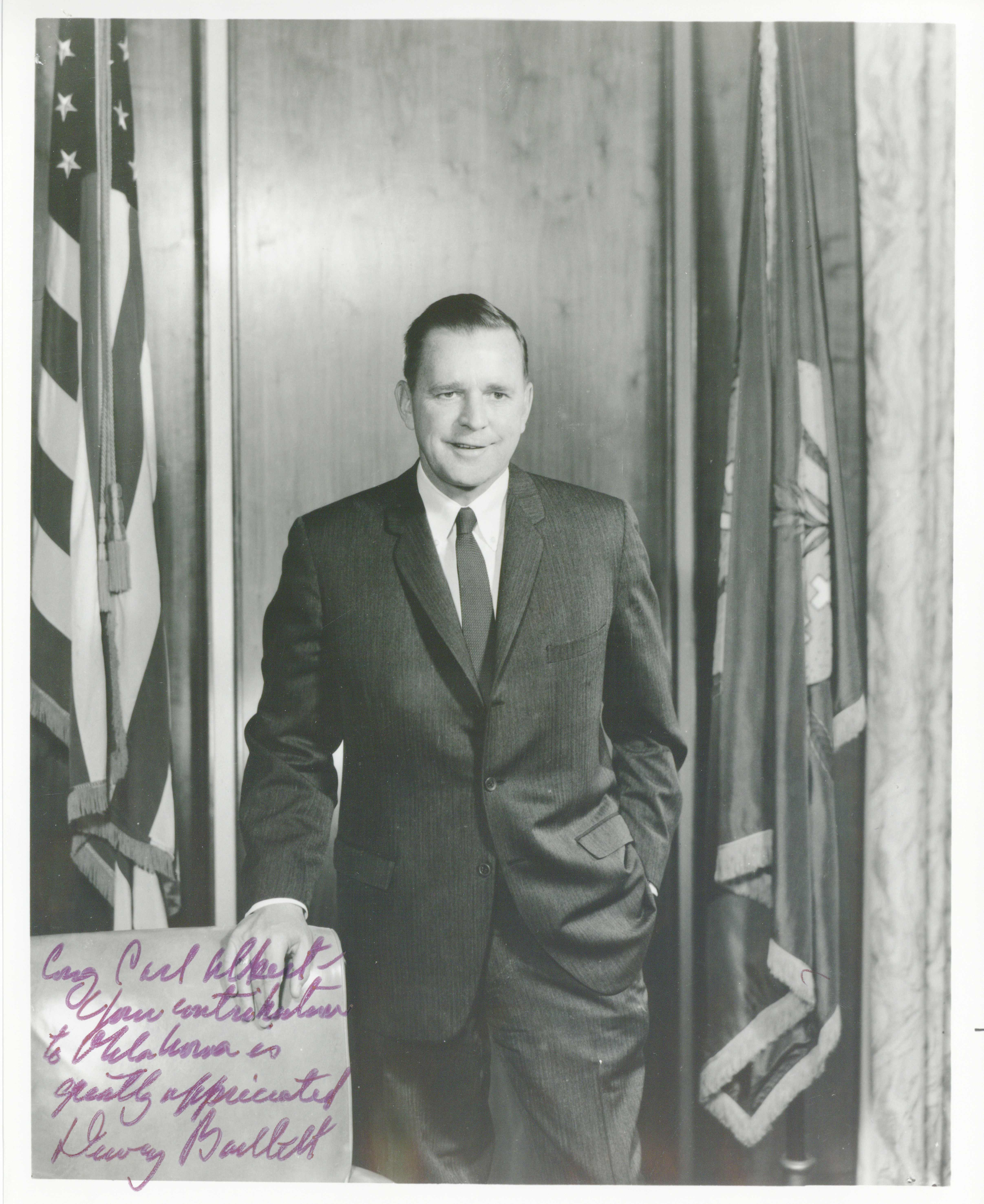
Governor Dewey F. Bartlett of Oklahoma (endorsed Nixon)

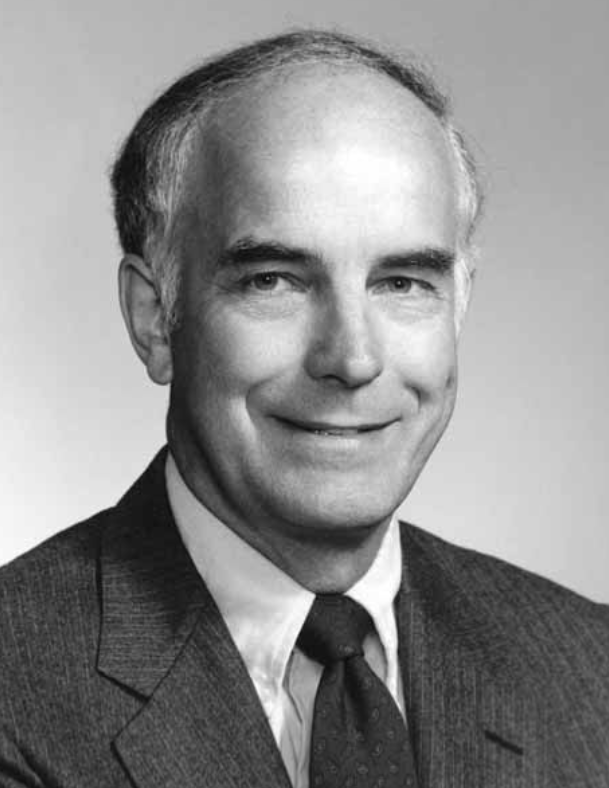
Governor Daniel J. Evans of Washington

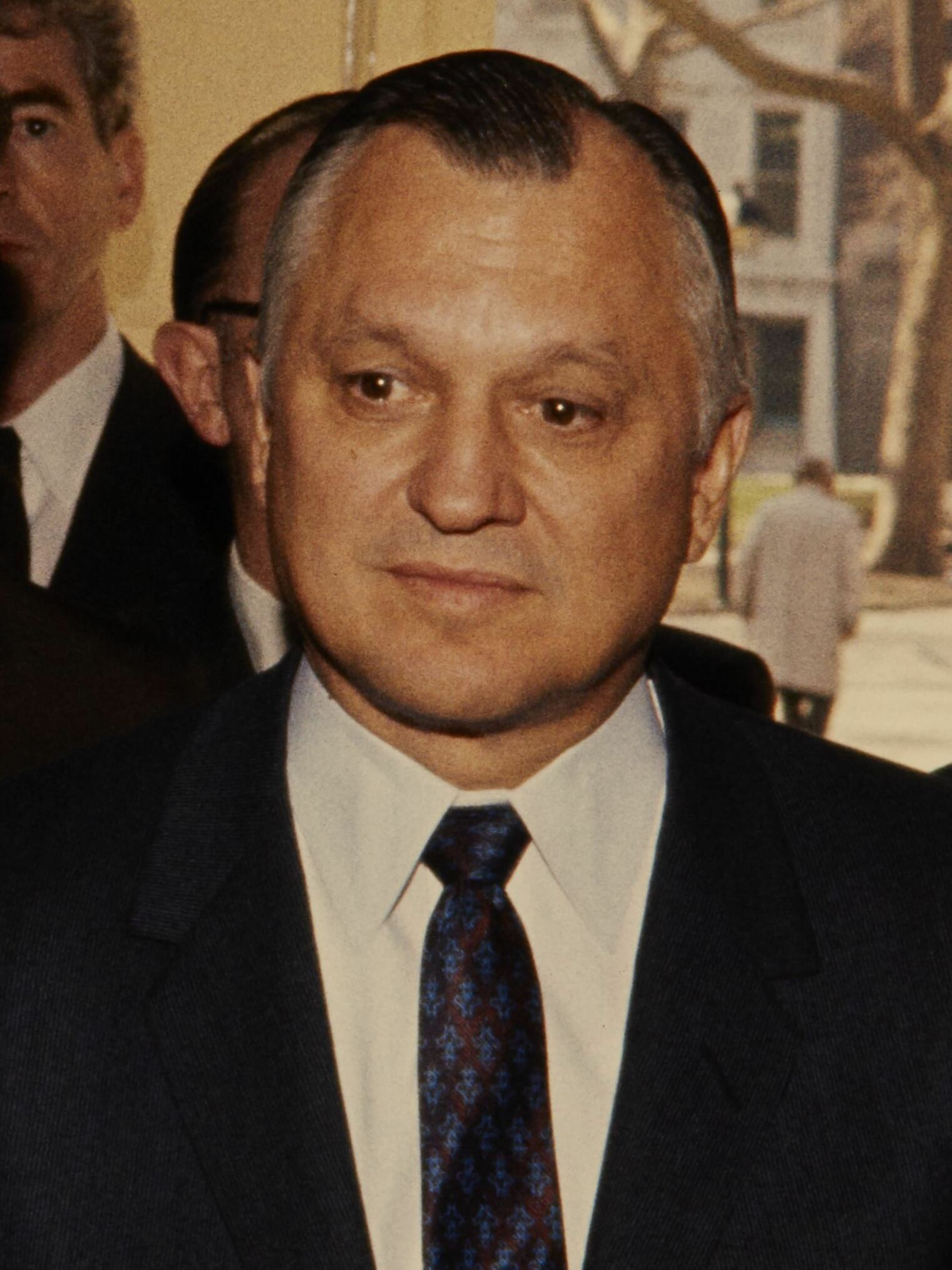
Governor Wally Hickel of Alaska (endorsed Nixon)

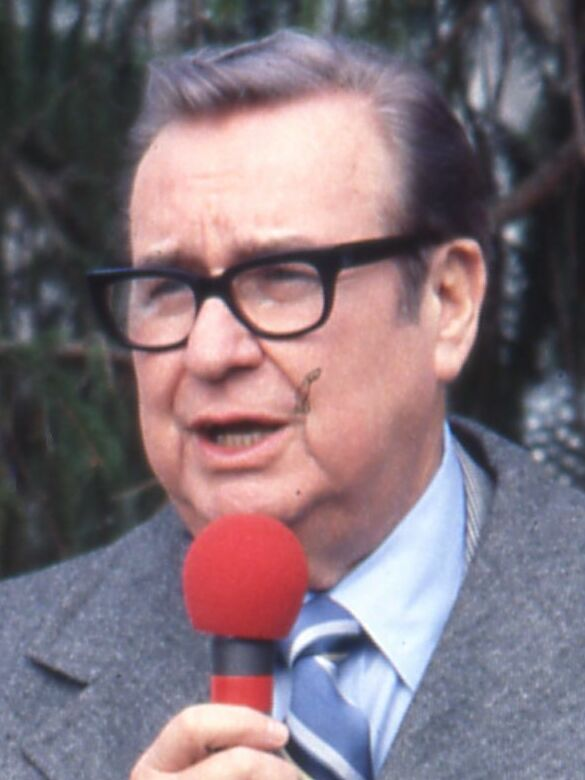
Governor James A. Rhodes of Ohio (endorsed Rockefeller)

Governor Raymond P. Shafer of Pennsylvania (endorsed Rockefeller)

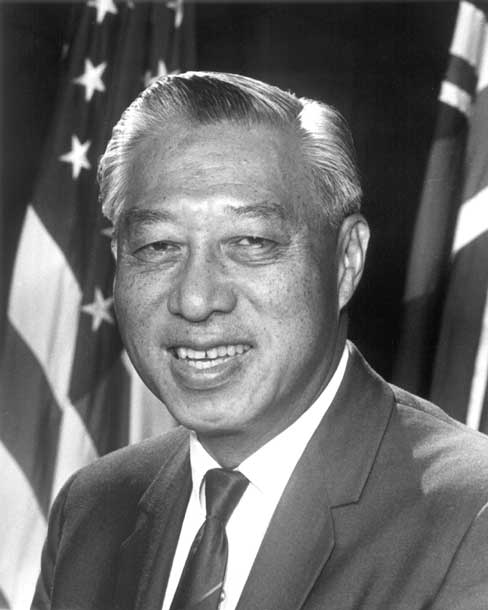
Senator Hiram Fong of Hawaii (endorsed Nixon)

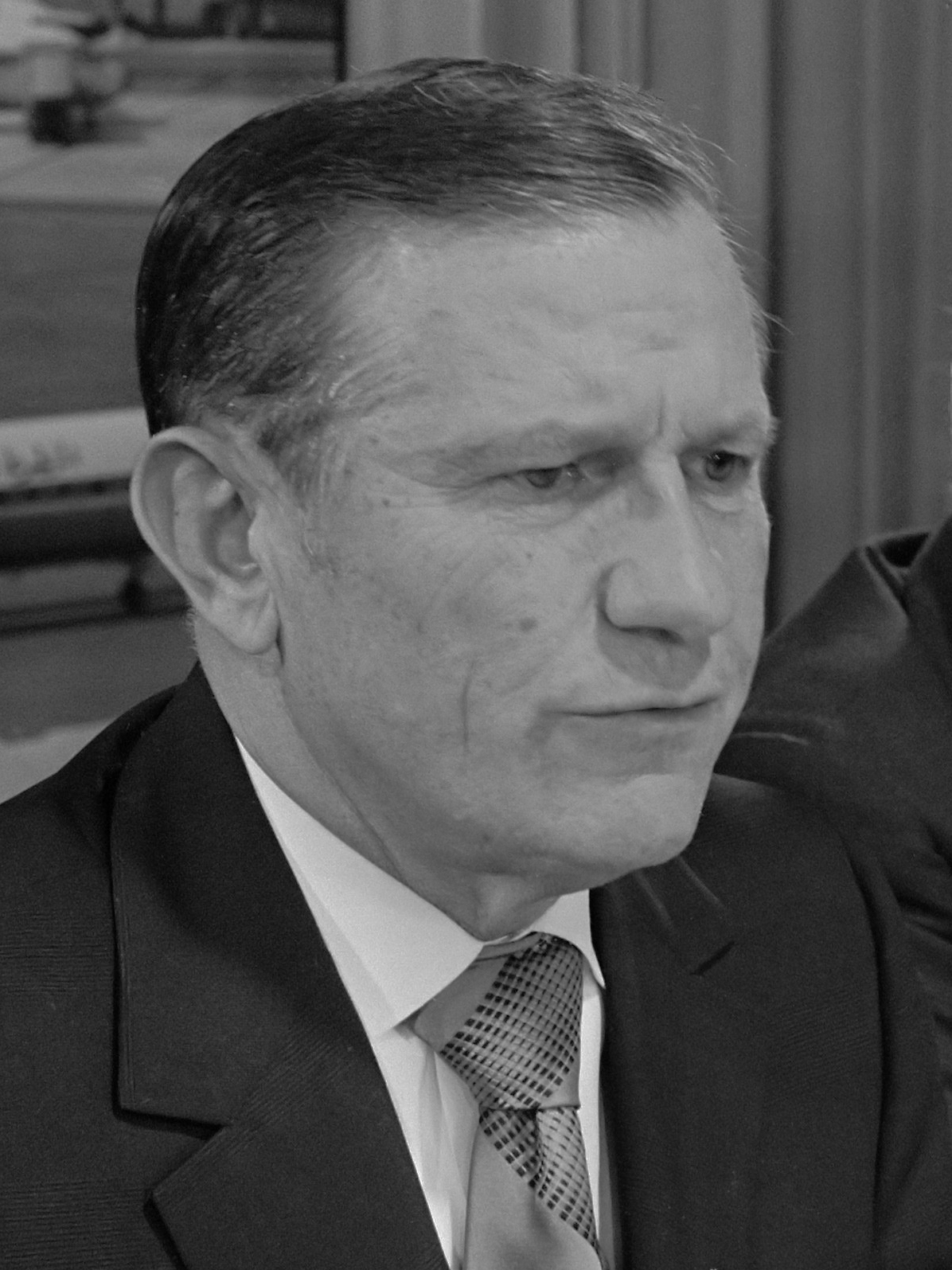
Governor John Volpe of Massachusetts (endorsed Nixon)

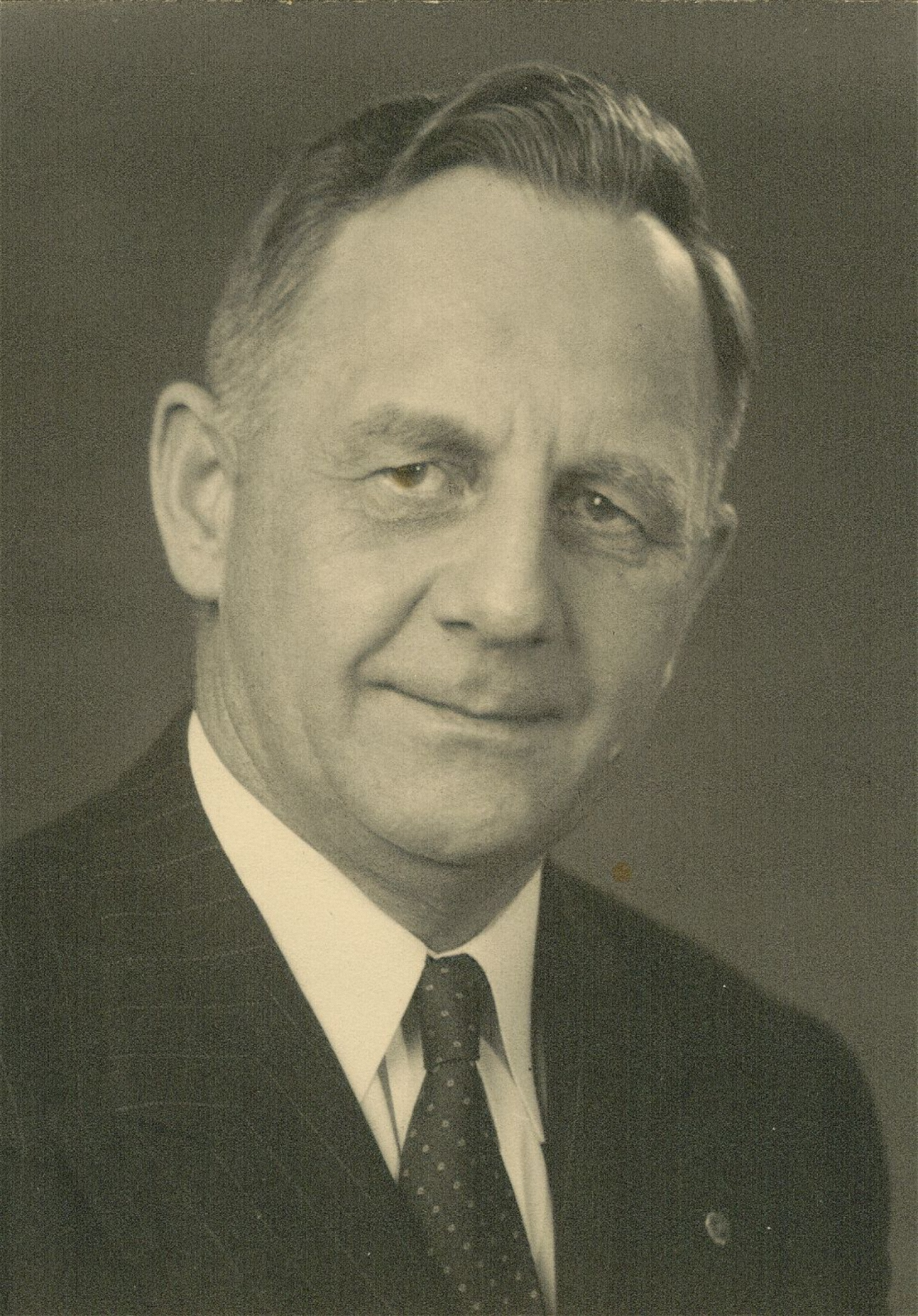
Senator Frank Carlson of Kansas

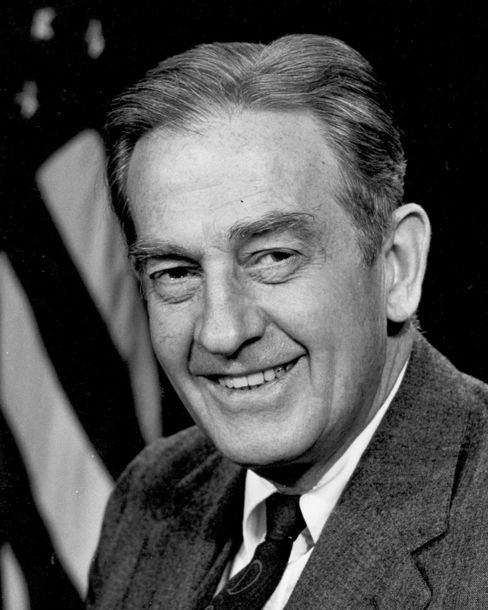
Senator Clifford Case of New Jersey

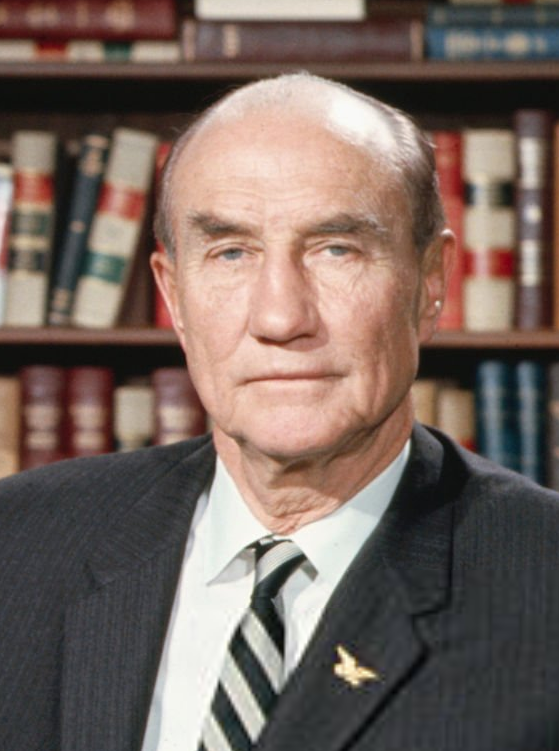
Senator Strom Thurmond of South Carolina (endorsed Nixon)

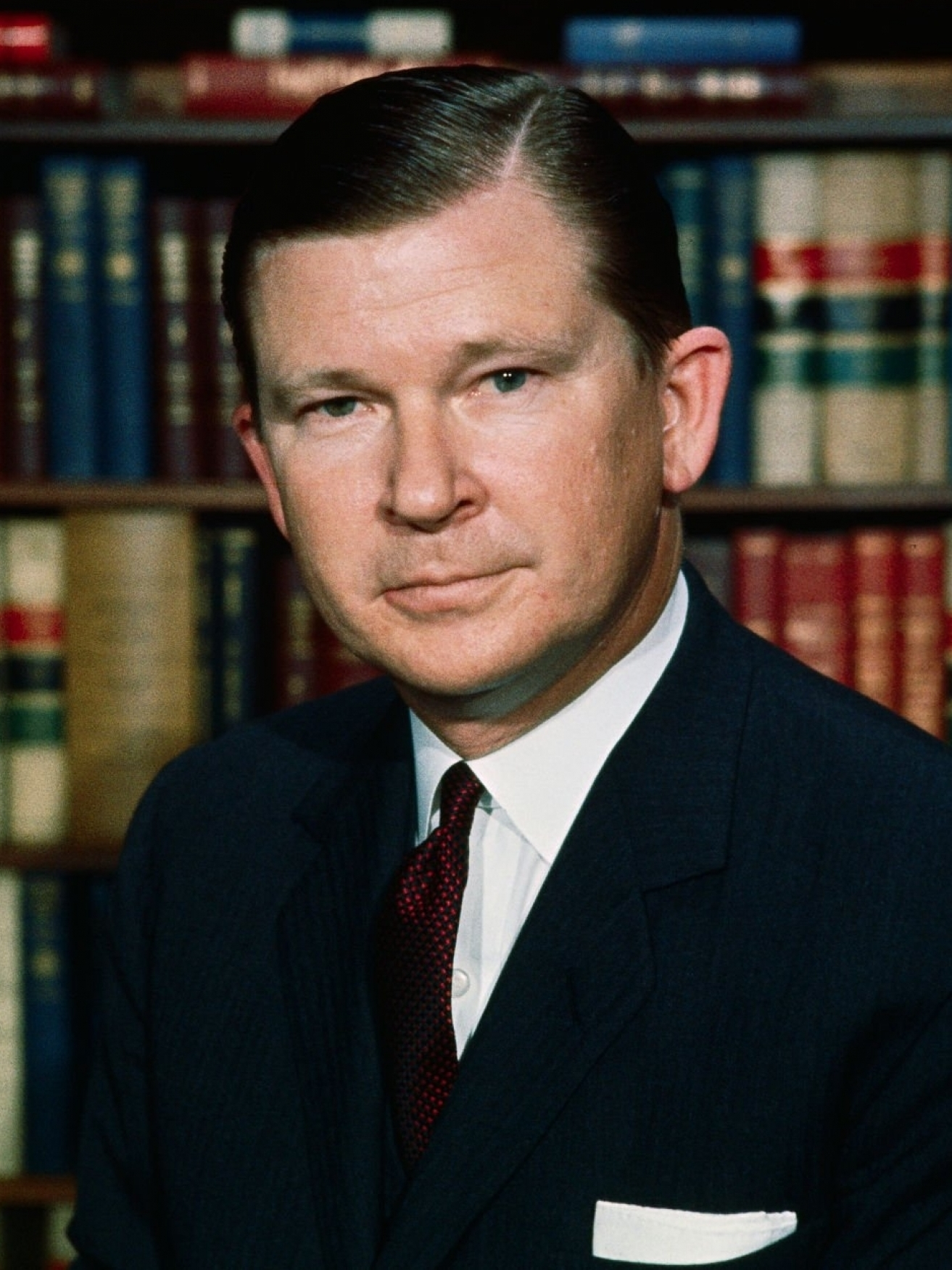
Senator John Tower of Texas (endorsed Nixon)

=== Declined to run ===
The following persons were listed in two or more major national polls or were the subject of media speculation surrounding their potential candidacy, but declined to actively seek the nomination.

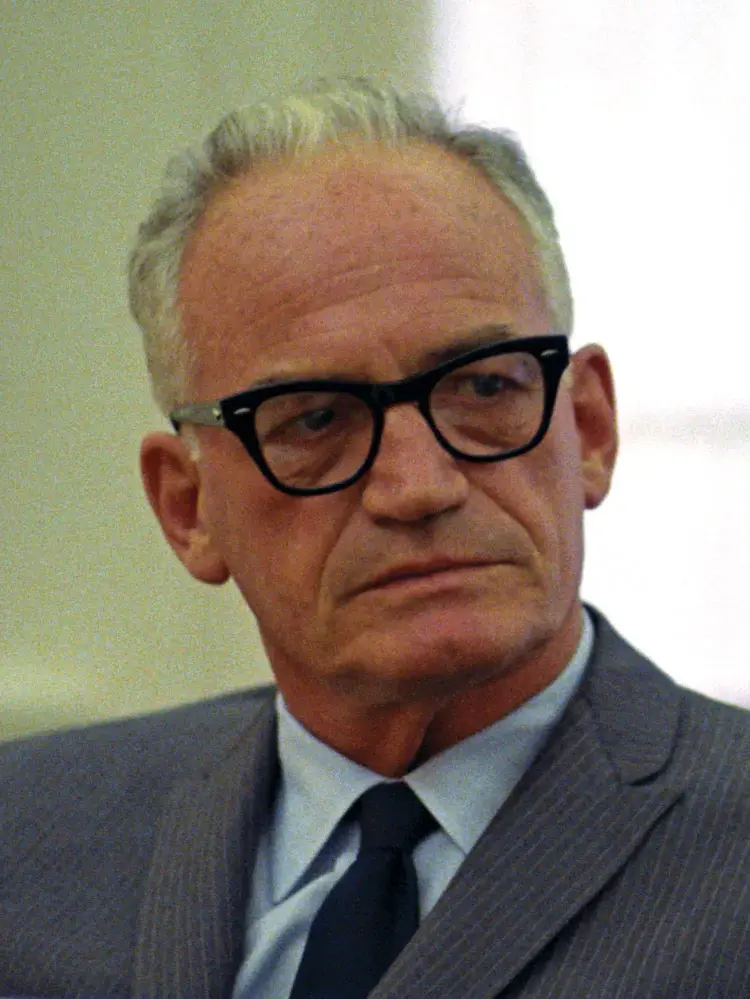
Former Senator and 1964 GOP presidential nominee Barry Goldwater of Arizona (ran for U.S. Senate)

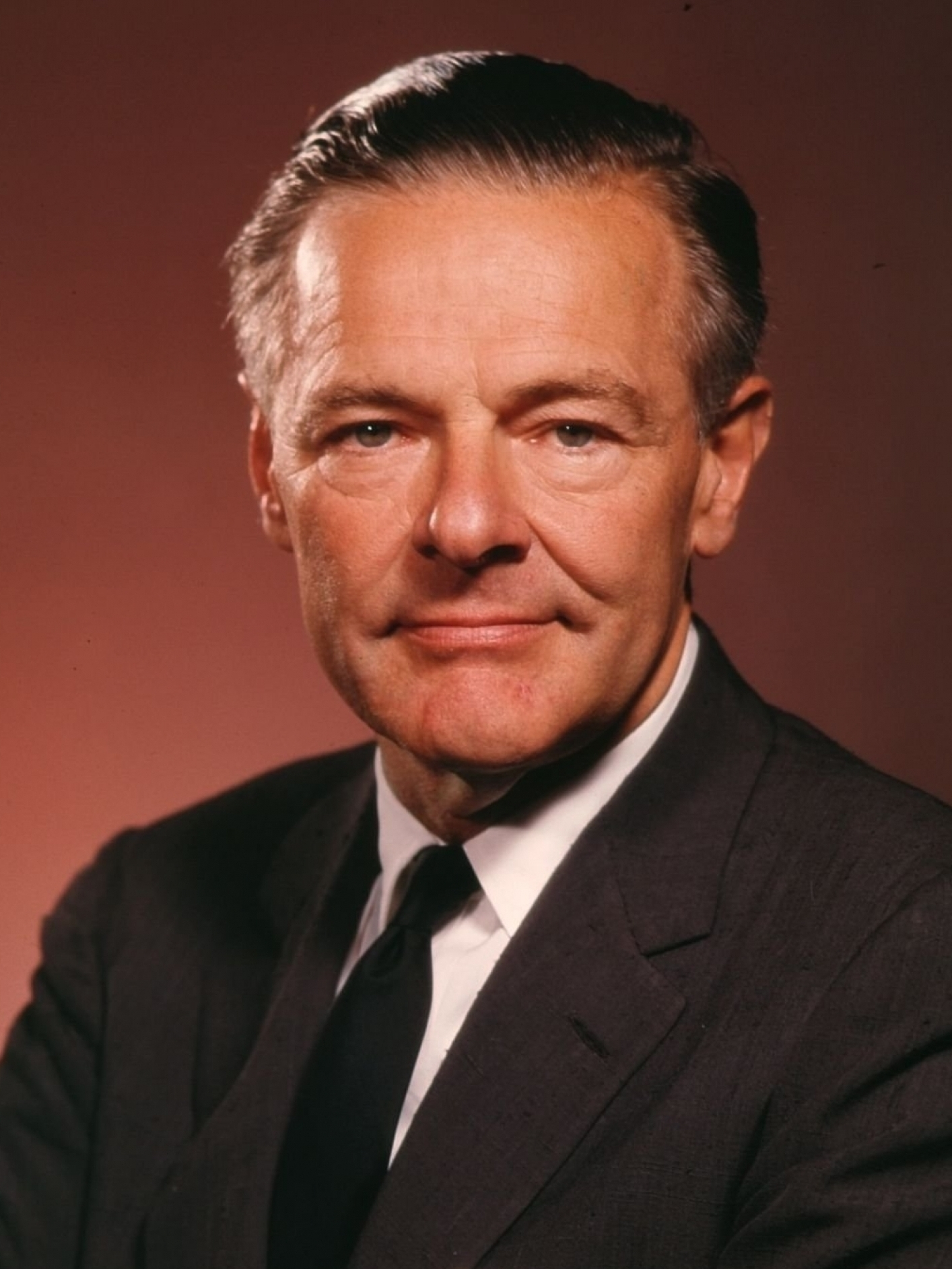
Ambassador and former 1960 GOP vice presidential nominee Henry Cabot Lodge Jr. of Massachusetts

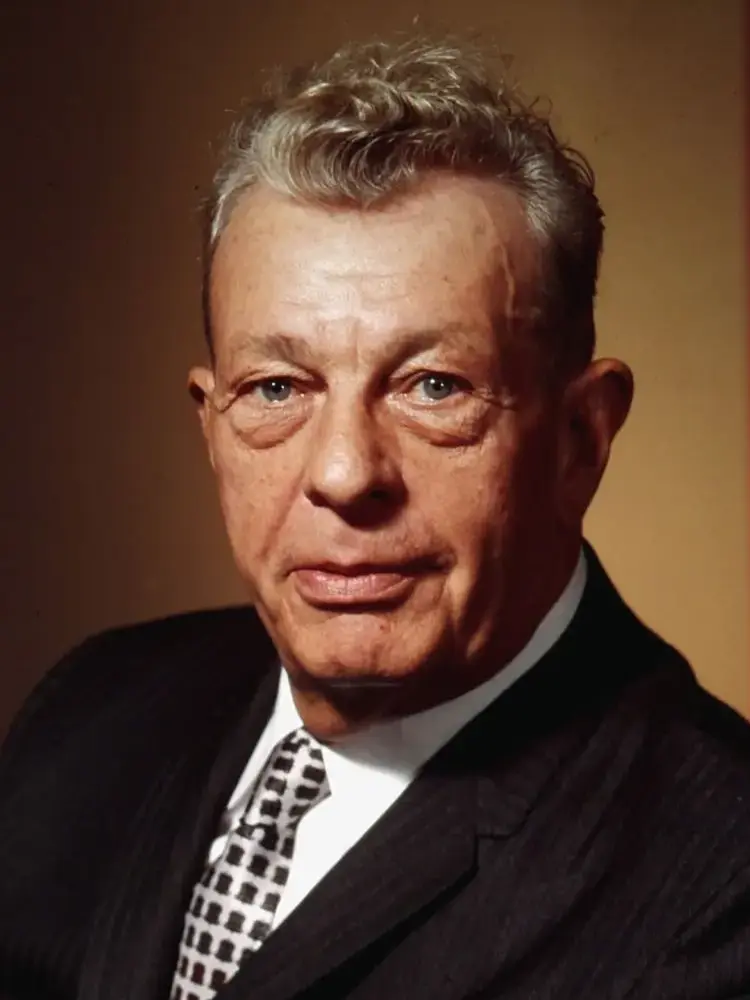
Senator Everett Dirksen of Illinois

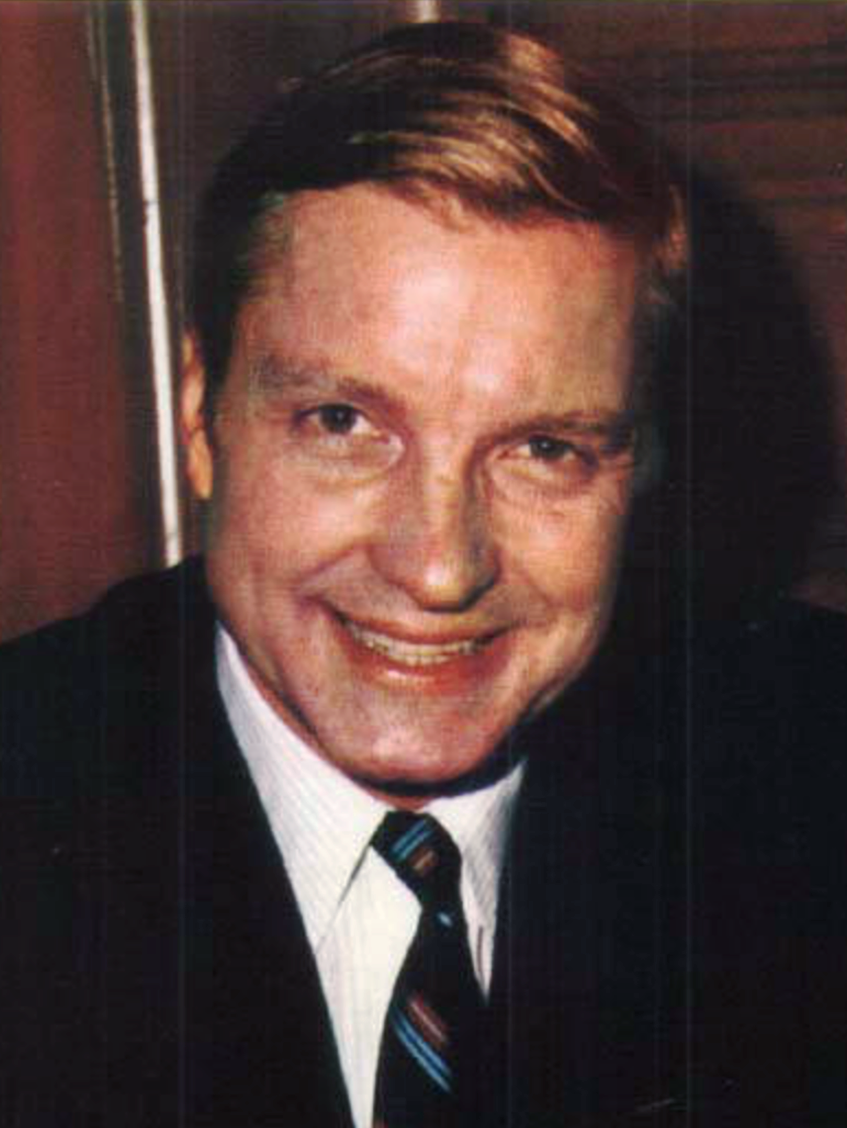
Senator Charles H. Percy of Illinois (endorsed Rockefeller)

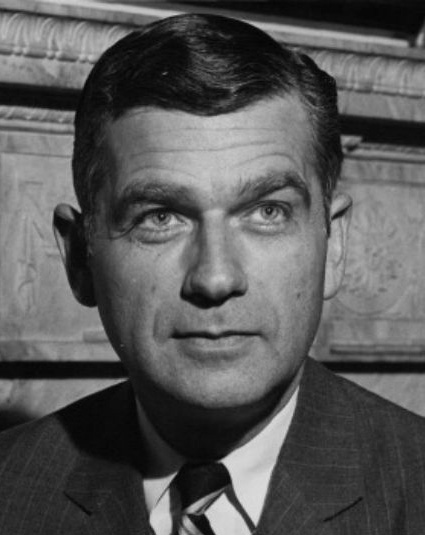
Senator Mark Hatfield of Oregon

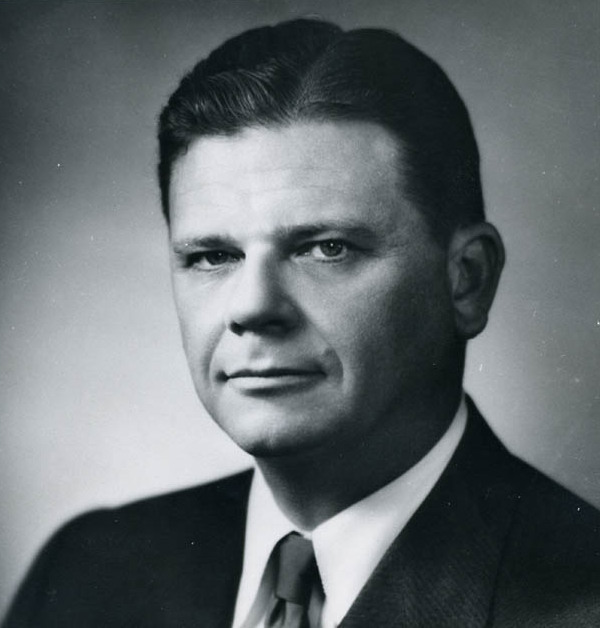
Senator Thruston Ballard Morton of Kentucky (endorsed Rockefeller)

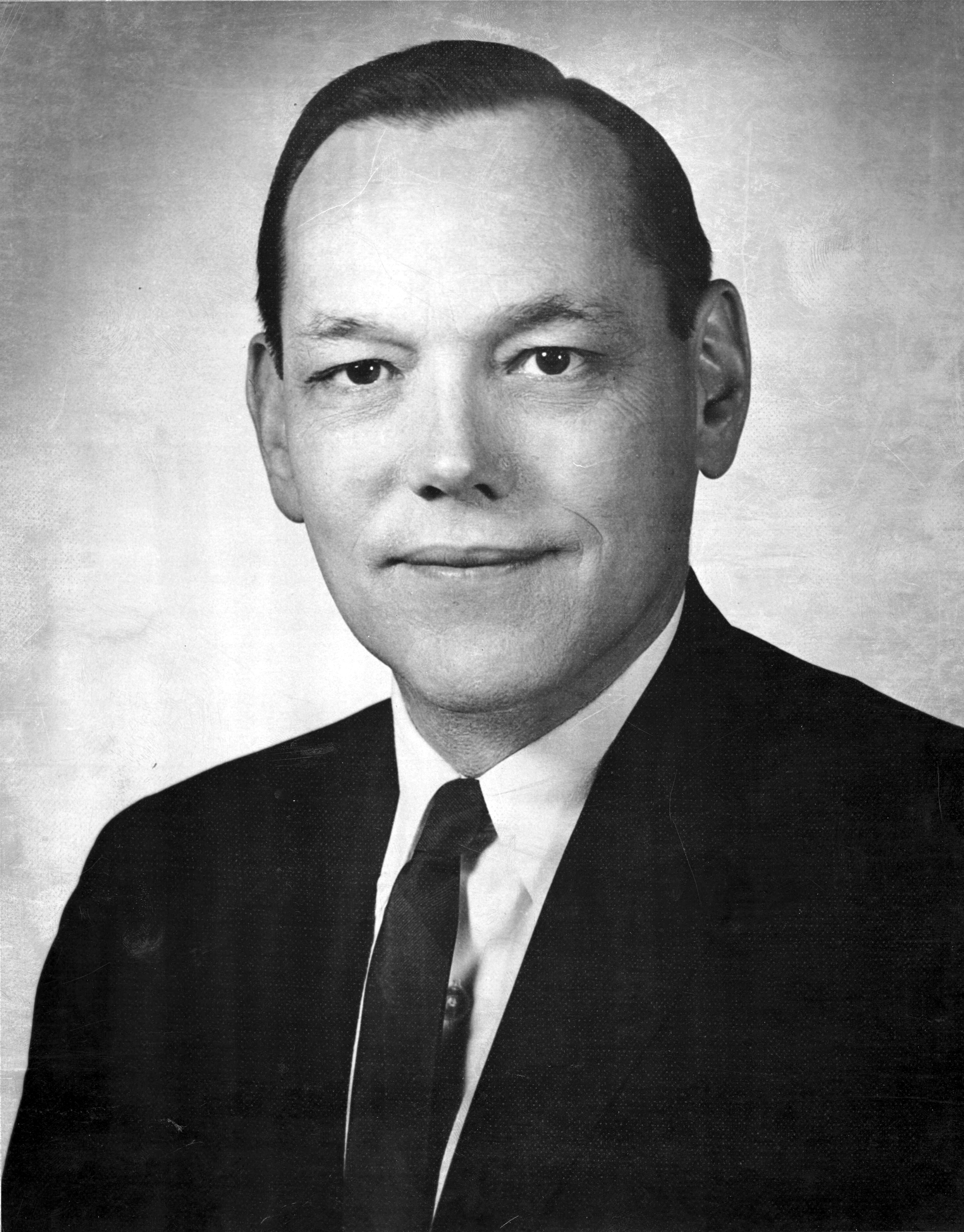
Representative Robert Taft Jr. of Ohio

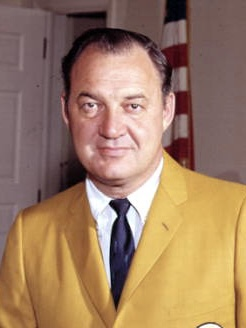
Governor Claude R. Kirk Jr. of Florida (endorsed Rockefeller)

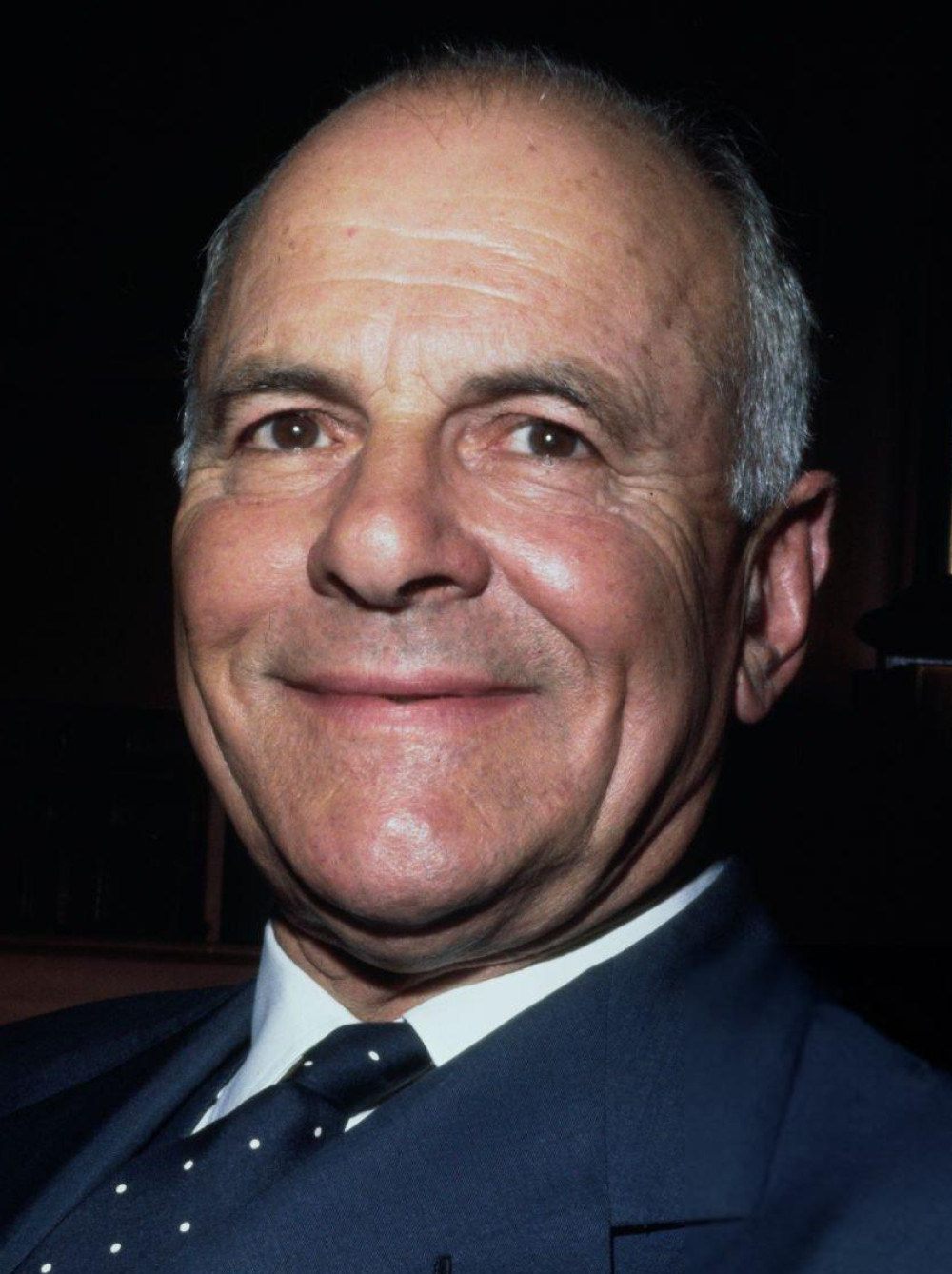
Former Governor John Davis Lodge of Connecticut (endorsed Nixon)

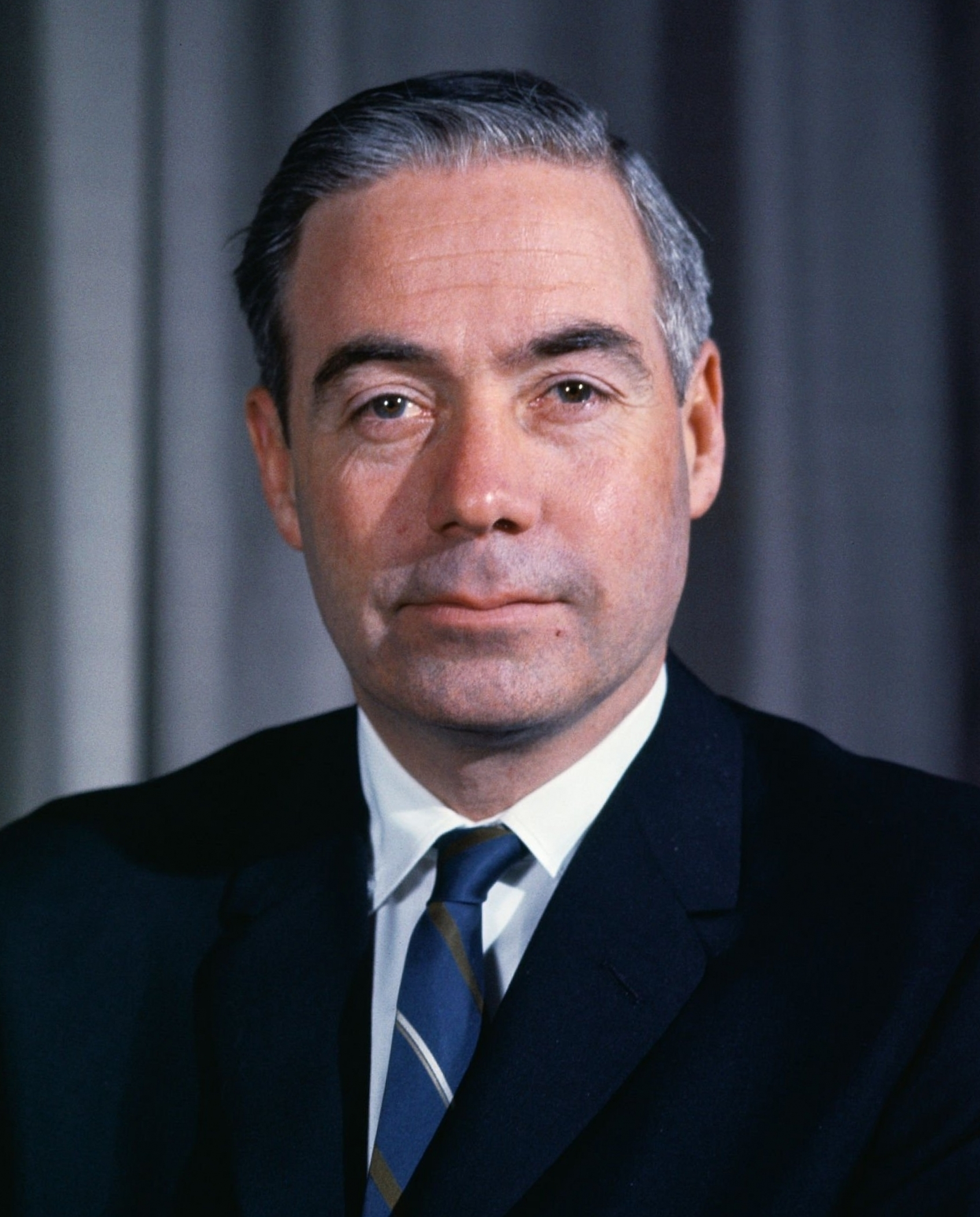
Former Governor William Scranton of Pennsylvania

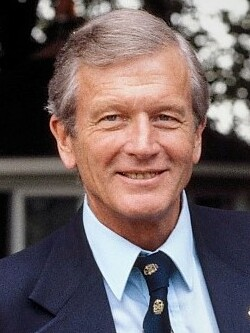
Mayor of New York City John Lindsay (endorsed Rockefeller)

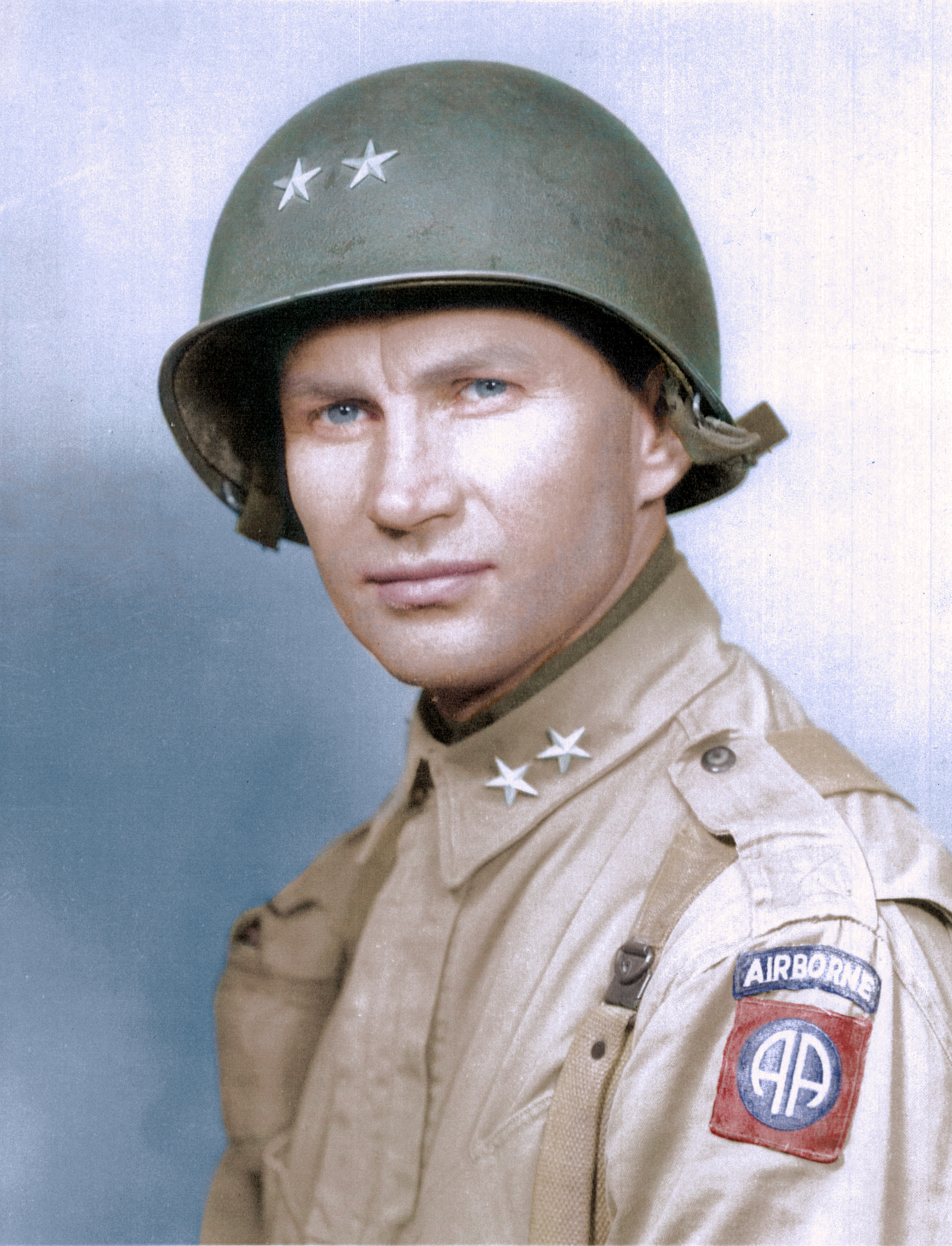
Retired Lt. General James M. Gavin from New York

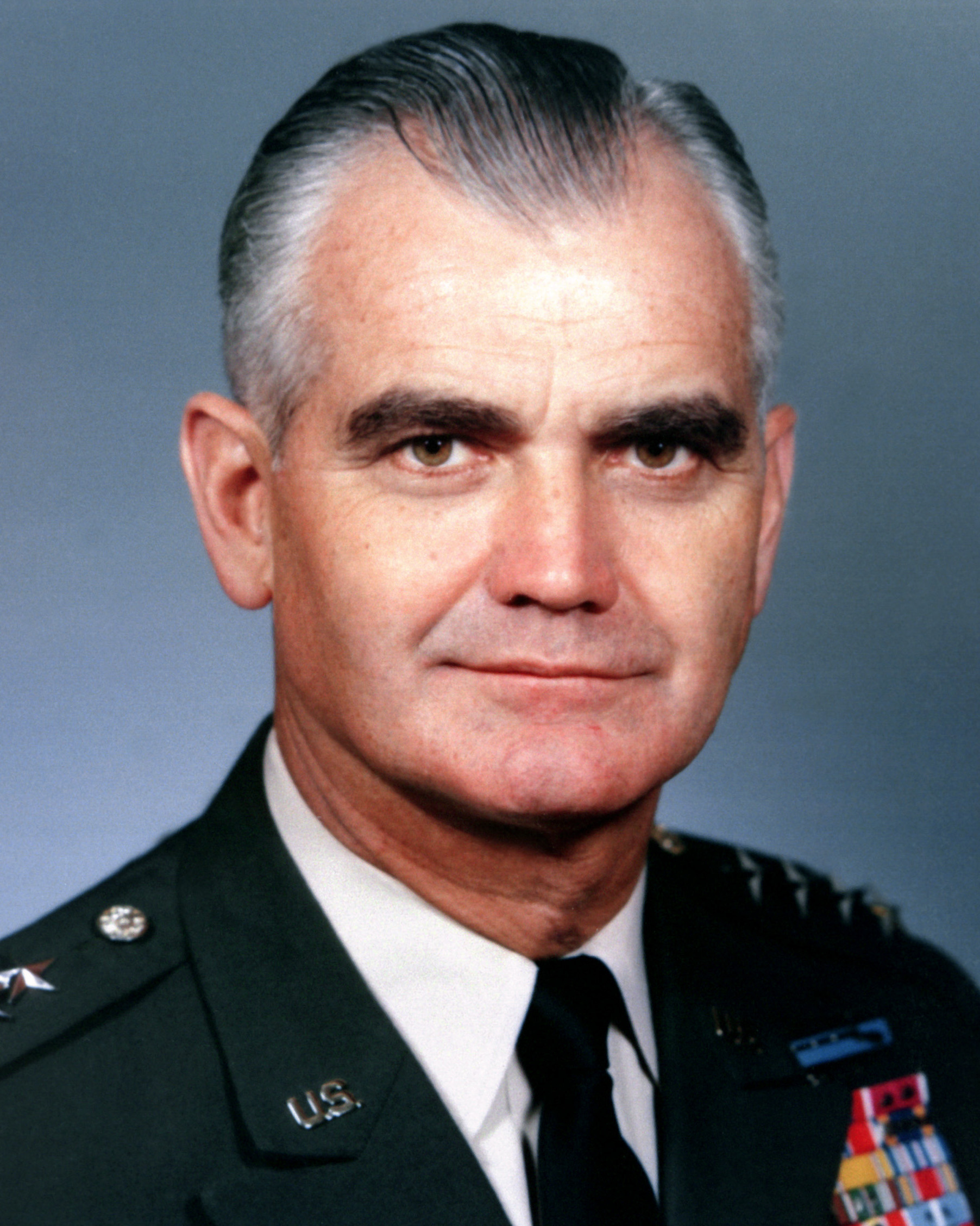
General William Westmoreland from South Carolina

== Polling ==
=== National polling ===
Graph of opinion polls conducted View source data.

==== Before November 1966 ====
Poll source	Publication	Everett Dirksen	Henry Cabot Lodge Jr.	Barry Goldwater	Richard Nixon	Ronald Reagan	George Romney	Nelson Rockefeller	William Scranton	Other	Undecided
Gallup	Jan. 10, 1965	–	18%	15%	27%	–	14%	6%	8%	9% (Note: Robert Taft Jr. with 4%, Mark Hatfield with 3%, and Charles Percy with 2%)	3%
Gallup	March 24, 1965	–	16%	11%	36%	–	14%	4%	8%	8% (Note: Robert Taft Jr. with 4%, Mark Hatfield and Charles Percy with 2% each)	3%
Gallup	June 27, 1965	7%	14%	13%	25%	3%	11%	6%	7%	11% (Note: John Lindsay with 5%, Robert Taft Jr. with 3%, Mark Hatfield with 2%, and Charles Percy with 1%)	3%
Gallup	Sep. 26, 1965	5%	12%	9%	28%	2%	15%	7%	8%	9% (Note: John Lindsay with 3%, Robert Taft Jr. with 3%, Mark Hatfield with 2%, and Charles Percy with 1%)	8%
Gallup	Oct. 1965	6%	11%	12%	26%	3%	15%	7%	7%	6% (Note: John Lindsay with 2%, Robert Taft Jr. with 2%, Mark Hatfield and Charles Percy with 1% each)	7%
Gallup	Dec. 5, 1965	5%	12%	13%	34%	1%	11%	4%	5%	10% (Note: John Lindsay with 4%, Robert Taft Jr. with 3%, Mark Hatfield with 2%, and Charles Percy with 1%)	5%
Gallup	Feb. 6, 1966	5%	15%	11%	33%	3%	10%	5%	5%	11% (Note: John Lindsay with 4%, Robert Taft Jr. with 4%, Charles Percy with 2% and Mark Hatfield with 1%)	2%
Gallup	April 10, 1966	7%	12%	13%	27%	4%	14%	5%	6%	3% (Note: John Lindsay with 2% and Mark Hatfield with 1%)	9%
Gallup	April 1966	–	–	–	–	11%	34%	–	17%	18% (Note: John Lindsay with 11% and Mark Hatfield with 7%)	20%
Gallup	July 10, 1966	–	–	–	–	17%	38%	–	20%	11% (Note: John Lindsay with 6% and Mark Hatfield with 5%)	14%

==== After November 1966 ====
Poll source	Publication	Richard Nixon	Charles Percy	Ronald Reagan	George Romney	Nelson Rockefeller	Other	Undecided
Gallup	Nov. 25, 1966	31%	–	8%	39%	5%	11% (Note: Mark Hatfield with 3% and John Lindsay with 2%)	7%
Gallup (Note: This poll was withdrawn from national newspapers by the Gallup organization after allegations of inconsistent methodology.)	Feb. 12, 1967	39%	6%	7%	28%	11%	5% (Note: Mark Hatfield with 3% and John Lindsay with 2%)	4%
Gallup	March 19, 1967	39%	4%	8%	30%	9%	6% (Note: Mark Hatfield with 4% and John Lindsay with 2%)	4%
Gallup	May 21, 1967	43%	6%	7%	28%	7%	5% (Note: Mark Hatfield with 3% and John Lindsay with 2%)	4%
Gallup	July 12, 1967	39%	7%	11%	25%	10%	4% (Note: Mark Hatfield and John Lindsay with 2% each)	4%
Gallup	Aug. 23, 1967	33%	6%	15%	26%	12%	5% (Note: Charles Percy with 6%, John Lindsay with 3%, and Mark Hatfield with 2%)	3%
Gallup	Aug. 22–26, 1967	35%	6%	11%	24%	14%	4% (Note: Mark Hatfield and John Lindsay with 2% each)	6%
Gallup	Sep. 15–19, 1967	40%	9%	16%	14%	17%	2% (Note: Mark Hatfield and John Lindsay with 1% each)	2%
Gallup	Nov. 19, 1967	42%	5%	13%	14%	15%	6% (Note: Mark Hatfield and John Lindsay with 3% each)	5%
Gallup	Jan 1968	42%	5%	8%	12%	27%	4% (Note: Mark Hatfield with 2%, John Lindsay and James M. Gavin with 1% each)	2%
Gallup	Feb. 21, 1968	51%	3%	8%	7%	25%	5% (Note: Mark Hatfield with 2%, John Lindsay with 2%, and James M. Gavin with 1%)	1%
Gallup	July 28, 1968	60%	2%	7%	–	23%	6% (Note: John Lindsay with 4%, Mark Hatfield with 1%, and Harold Stassen with 1%)	

==== Head-to-head polling ====
Nixon v. Romney

Poll source	Date(s)	Richard Nixon	George Romney	Undecided
Gallup	Nov. 25, 1965	55%	38%	7%
Gallup	July 10, 1966	55%	40%	5%
Gallup	Nov. 1967	65%	31%	4%
Gallup	Jan. 31, 1968	68%	26%	6%

=== Statewide polling ===
==== New Hampshire ====
Poll source	Publication	Richard Nixon	George Romney	Nelson Rockefeller	Other
Roper Research Associates	March 4, 1968	65%	9%	13%	13% (Note: "widely distributed")

== Primary race ==
Nixon was the front-runner for the Republican nomination and to a great extent the story of the Republican primary campaign and nomination is the story of one Nixon opponent after another entering the race and then dropping out.

Nixon's first challenger was Michigan Governor George W. Romney. Romney's grandfather, a member of the Church of Jesus Christ of Latter-day Saints, had emigrated to Mexico in 1886 with his three wives and their children, after the U.S. federal government outlawed polygamy. However Romney's parents (monogamous under new church doctrine) retained their U.S. citizenship and returned to the United States with him and his siblings in 1912. Questions were occasionally asked about Romney's eligibility to hold the office of President due to his birth in Mexico, given an asserted ambiguity in the United States Constitution over the phrase "natural-born citizen". By February 1967, some newspapers were questioning Romney's eligibility given his Mexican birth.

A Gallup poll in mid-1967 showed Nixon with 39%, followed by Romney with 25%. However, in a slip of the tongue, Romney told a news reporter that he had been "brainwashed" by the military and the diplomatic corps into supporting the Vietnam War; the remark led to weeks of ridicule in the national news media. As the year 1968 opened, Romney was opposed to further American intervention in Vietnam and had decided to run as the Republican version of Eugene McCarthy (The New York Times 2/18/1968). Romney's support slowly faded and he withdrew from the race on February 28, 1968. (The New York Times 2/29/1968).

Nixon won a resounding victory in the important New Hampshire primary on March 12, winning 78% of the vote. Anti-war Republicans wrote in the name of New York Governor Nelson Rockefeller, the leader of the GOP's liberal wing, who received 11% of the vote and became Nixon's new challenger. Nixon led Rockefeller in the polls throughout the primary campaign. Rockefeller defeated Nixon in the Massachusetts primary on April 30 but otherwise fared poorly in the state primaries and conventions.

By early spring, California Governor Ronald Reagan, the leader of the GOP's conservative wing, had become Nixon's chief rival. In the Nebraska primary on May 14, Nixon won with 70% of the vote to 21% for Reagan and 5% for Rockefeller. While this was a wide margin for Nixon, Reagan remained Nixon's leading challenger. Nixon won the next primary of importance, Oregon, on May 15 with 65% of the vote and won all the following primaries except for California (June 4), where only Reagan appeared on the ballot. Reagan's margin in California gave him a plurality of the nationwide primary vote, but when the Republican National Convention assembled, Nixon had 656 delegates according to a UPI poll (with 667 needed for the nomination).

Total popular vote

- Ronald Reagan – 1,696,632 (37.93%)
- Richard Nixon – 1,679,443 (37.54%)
- James A. Rhodes – 614,492 (13.74%)
- Nelson A. Rockefeller – 164,340 (3.67%)
- Unpledged – 140,639 (3.14%)
- Eugene McCarthy (write-in) – 44,520 (1.00%)
- Harold Stassen – 31,655 (0.71%)
- John Volpe – 31,465 (0.70%)
- Others – 21,456 (0.51%)
- George Wallace (write-in) – 15,291 (0.34%)
- Robert F. Kennedy (write-in) – 14,524 (0.33%)
- Hubert Humphrey (write-in) – 5,698 (0.13)
- Lyndon Johnson (write-in) – 4,824 (0.11%)
- George Romney – 4,447 (0.10%)
- Raymond P. Shafer – 1,223 (0.03%)
- William W. Scranton – 724 (0.02%)
- Charles H. Percy – 689 (0.02%)
- Barry M. Goldwater – 598 (0.01%)
- John V. Lindsay – 591 (0.01%)

=== Endorsements ===
List of Richard Nixon endorsements

Former Presidents

- Dwight Eisenhower, 34th President of the United States
List of Nelson Rockefeller endorsements

U.S. Senators

- Edward Brooke (R-MA)
- Clifford Case (R-NJ)
- Mark Hatfield (R-OR)
- Jacob Javits (R-NY)
- Thruston Morton (R-KY)
- Charles H. Percy (R-IL)
- Hugh Scott (R-PA)

U.S. Representatives

- Edward G. Biester Jr. (R-PA)
- Daniel Button (R-NY)
- Silvio Conte (R-MA)
- Paul Findley (R-IL)
- Gilbert Gude (R-MD)
- Seymour Halpern (R-NY)
- Margaret Heckler (R-MA)
- Frank Horton (R-NY)
- John Lindsay (R-NY)
- Pete McCloskey (R-CA)
- William E. Miller (R-NY)
- Ogden Reid (R-NY)
- Richard Schweiker (R-PA)
- Charles W. Whalen Jr. (R-OH)

Governors

- John Chafee (R-RI)
- Daniel J. Evans (R-WA)
- Claude R. Kirk Jr. (R-FL)
- John A. Love (R-CO)
- Tom McCall (R-OR)
- Winthrop Rockefeller (R-AR)
- George W. Romney (R-MI)
- Raymond P. Shafer (R-PA)

Celebrities

- Nancy Ames, singer
- Kitty Carlisle, actress
- Billy Daniels, singer
- Hildegarde, singer
- Teresa Wright, actress

Individuals

- Ralph Abernathy, civil rights activist
- Philip Johnson, architect
- Maria Tallchief, dancer
List of George Romney endorsements

Representatives

- Charles Mathias (R-MD)
- Don Riegle (R-MI)

Governors

- David Cargo (R-MN)
- William Scranton (R-PA)

Lieutenant governors

- William Milliken (R-MI)

== The convention ==
At the 1968 Republican National Convention in Miami Beach, Florida, Reagan and Rockefeller planned to unite their forces in a stop-Nixon movement, but the strategy fell apart when neither man agreed to support the other for the nomination. Rockefeller in particular was seen as unacceptable to Southern Conservatives. Nixon won the nomination on the first ballot. He was able to secure the nomination because of the support of many Southern delegates, after he and his subordinates made concessions to Strom Thurmond and Harry Dent. Nixon then chose Maryland Governor Spiro Agnew to be his Vice-Presidential candidate, despite complaints from within the GOP that Agnew was an unknown quantity, and that a better-known and more popular candidate, such as Romney, should have been the Vice-Presidential nominee. However, Agnew was seen as a candidate who could appeal to Rockefeller Republicans, was acceptable to Southern Conservatives, and had a solid law-and-order record. It was also reported that Nixon's first choice for running mate was his longtime friend and ally, Robert Finch, who was the lieutenant governor of California since 1967 and later his HEW Secretary, but Finch declined the offer.

The Republican Convention tally (667 needed to secure nomination)
President	(before switches)	(after switches)	Vice president	Vice-presidential votes
Richard M. Nixon	692	1238	Spiro T. Agnew	1119
Nelson Rockefeller	277	93	George Romney	186
Ronald Reagan	182	2	John V. Lindsay	10
Ohio Governor James A. Rhodes	55	—	Massachusetts Senator Edward Brooke	1
Michigan Governor George Romney	50	—	James A. Rhodes	1
New Jersey Senator Clifford Case	22	—	Not voting	16
Kansas Senator Frank Carlson	20	—	—	
Arkansas Governor Winthrop Rockefeller	18	—	—	
Hawaii Senator Hiram Fong	14	—	—	
Harold Stassen	2	—	—	
New York City Mayor John V. Lindsay	1	—	—	

== See also ==
- 1968 Democratic Party presidential primaries

== Bibliography ==
- Troy, Gil; Schlesinger, Arthur M.; Israel, Fred L. (2012). History of American Presidential Elections, 1789–2008. Vol. 3 (4 ed.). New York City: Facts on File. ISBN 978-0-8160-8220-9.
