= 1968 United States Senate election in Arizona =

- November 5, 1968
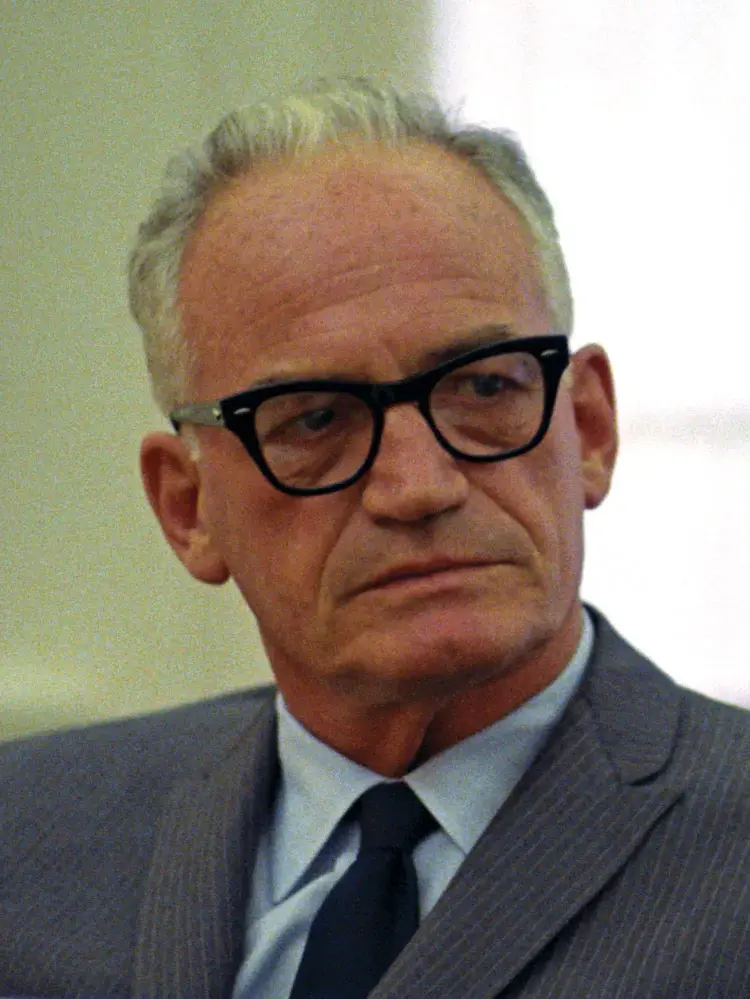

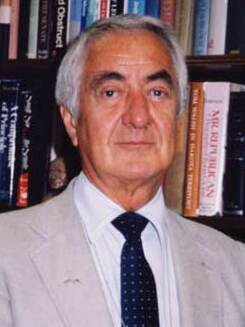
Nominee	Barry Goldwater	Roy Elson
Party	Republican	Democratic
Popular vote	274,607	205,338
Percentage	57.22%	42.78%
- County results Goldwater: 50–60% 60–70% Elson: 50–60% 60–70% 70–80%
U.S. senator before election
Carl Hayden
Democratic
Elected U.S. Senator
Barry Goldwater
Republican

The 1968 United States Senate election in Arizona took place on November 5, 1968. Incumbent Democratic U.S. Senator Carl Hayden, 91, decided not to run for reelection to an eighth term, ending his 57-year-long career in Congress. Hayden's longtime staff member, Roy Elson, ran as the Democratic Party nominee to replace him. Elson was defeated by a wide margin, however, by former U.S. Senator and 1964 Republican presidential nominee Barry Goldwater, who staged a political comeback. Prior to Goldwater's election, the seat had been held for decades by the Democratic Party under Carl Hayden. After this election, the seat remained in Republican Party control continuously for 52 years, until Democrat Mark Kelly won in the 2020 special election, replacing the late Senator John McCain.

Elson had previously challenged Governor Paul Fannin in the 1964 Senate race, when Goldwater vacated his seat in order to run for president against Lyndon B. Johnson.

== Democratic primary ==
=== Candidates ===
- Roy Elson, staff member to Senator Carl Hayden, 1964 Democratic nominee for U.S. Senate
- Bob Kennedy, State Treasurer of Arizona
- Dick Herbert, Corporation Commissioner

=== Results ===
Democratic primary results
Party	Candidate	Votes	%
Democratic	Roy Elson	95,231	62.7%
Democratic	Bob Kennedy	41,397	27.3%
Total votes		136,628	100.0

== Republican primary ==
=== Candidates ===
- Barry Goldwater, former U.S. Senator, 1964 Republican Party nominee for President of the United States

== General election ==
United States Senate election in Arizona, 1968
Party	Candidate	Votes	%	±%
Republican	Barry Goldwater	274,607	57.22%	+12.16%
Democratic	Roy Elson	205,338	42.78%	−12.16%
Majority		69,269	14.43%	+4.55%
Turnout		479,945		
Republican gain from Democratic		Swing		

== See also ==
- United States Senate elections, 1968
