= Attorney General Morrison =

Attorney General Morrison may refer to:

- Donald Morison (1857–1924), Attorney General of Newfoundland
- Howard Morrison (barrister) (born 1949), Attorney General of Anguilla
- Paul J. Morrison (born 1954), Attorney General of Kansas
- Robert Morrison (politician) (1909–1999), Attorney General of Arizona
