= 1962 Arizona gubernatorial election =

- November 6, 1962
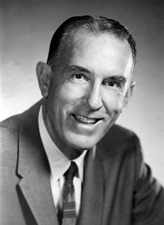

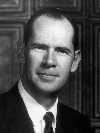
| Nominee | Paul Fannin | Samuel Goddard |
| Party | Republican | Democratic |
| Popular vote | 200,578 | 165,263 |
| Percentage | 54.83% | 45.17% |
- County results Fannin: 50–60% 60–70% Goddard: 50–60% 60–70%
Governor before election
Paul Fannin
Republican
Elected Governor
Paul Fannin
Republican

The 1962 Arizona gubernatorial election took place on November 6, 1962. Incumbent Governor Paul Fannin ran for reelection against President of the Western Conference of United Funds Samuel Pearson Goddard in the general election, winning a third consecutive term, a first for a Republican Governor in Arizona. Fannin was sworn into his third term on January 1, 1963.

== Republican primary ==
=== Candidates ===
- Paul Fannin, incumbent Governor

=== Results ===
Republican primary results
| Party | Candidate | Votes | % |
|---|---|---|---|
| Republican | Paul Fannin | 64,959 | 100.00% |
| Total votes | | 64,959 | 100.00% |

== Democratic primary ==
=== Candidates ===
- Samuel P. Goddard, president of the Western Conference of United Funds
- Joe C. Haldiman, Democratic nominee for governor in 1952
- J. Michael Morris

=== Results ===
Democratic primary results
| Party | Candidate | Votes | % |
|---|---|---|---|
| Democratic | Sam Goddard | 91,661 | 59.85% |
| Democratic | Joe C. Haldiman | 41,645 | 27.19% |
| Democratic | J. Michael Morris | 19,850 | 12.96% |
| Total votes | | 153,156 | 100.00% |

== General election ==
=== Results ===
Arizona gubernatorial election, 1962
| Party | Candidate | Votes | % | ±% |
|---|---|---|---|---|
| Republican | Paul Fannin (incumbent) | 200,578 | 54.83% | −4.48% |
| Democratic | Sam Goddard | 165,263 | 45.17% | +4.48% |
| Majority | | 35,315 | 9.66% | |
| Total votes | | 365,841 | 100.00% | |
| Republican hold | | Swing | -8.96% | |

=== Results by county ===
| County | Paul Fannin Republican | | Sam Goddard Democratic | | Margin | | Total votes cast |
| County | # | % | # | % | # | % | Total votes cast |
|---|---|---|---|---|---|---|---|
| Apache | 1,459 | 51.63% | 1,367 | 48.37% | 92 | 3.26% | 2,826 |
| Cochise | 6,206 | 46.39% | 7,171 | 53.61% | -965 | -7.21% | 13,377 |
| Coconino | 5,091 | 60.81% | 3,281 | 39.19% | 1,810 | 21.62% | 8,372 |
| Gila | 3,637 | 42.09% | 5,004 | 57.91% | 1,367 | -15.82% | 8,641 |
| Graham | 2,369 | 56.30% | 1,839 | 43.70% | 530 | 12.60% | 4,208 |
| Greenlee | 1,288 | 31.01% | 2,865 | 68.99% | -1,577 | -37.97% | 4,153 |
| Maricopa | 121,330 | 60.09% | 80,568 | 39.91% | 40,762 | 20.19% | 201,898 |
| Mohave | 1,583 | 54.61% | 1,316 | 45.39% | 267 | 9.21% | 2,899 |
| Navajo | 4,128 | 59.18% | 2,847 | 40.82% | 1,281 | 18.37% | 6,975 |
| Pima | 32,471 | 44.46% | 40,563 | 55.54% | -8,092 | -11.08% | 73,034 |
| Pinal | 6,707 | 48.67% | 7,073 | 51.33% | -366 | -2.66% | 13,780 |
| Santa Cruz | 1,515 | 46.16% | 1,767 | 53.84% | -252 | -7.68% | 3,282 |
| Yavapai | 7,004 | 63.76% | 3,981 | 36.24% | 3,023 | 27.52% | 10,985 |
| Yuma | 5,790 | 50.74% | 5,621 | 49.26% | 169 | 1.48% | 11,411 |
| Totals | 200,578 | 54.83% | 165,263 | 45.17% | 35,315 | 9.65% | 365,841 |

==== Counties that flipped from Republican to Democratic ====
- Cochise
- Pima
- Pinal
- Santa Cruz
