= 1968 New Hampshire Republican presidential primary =

- March 12, 1968
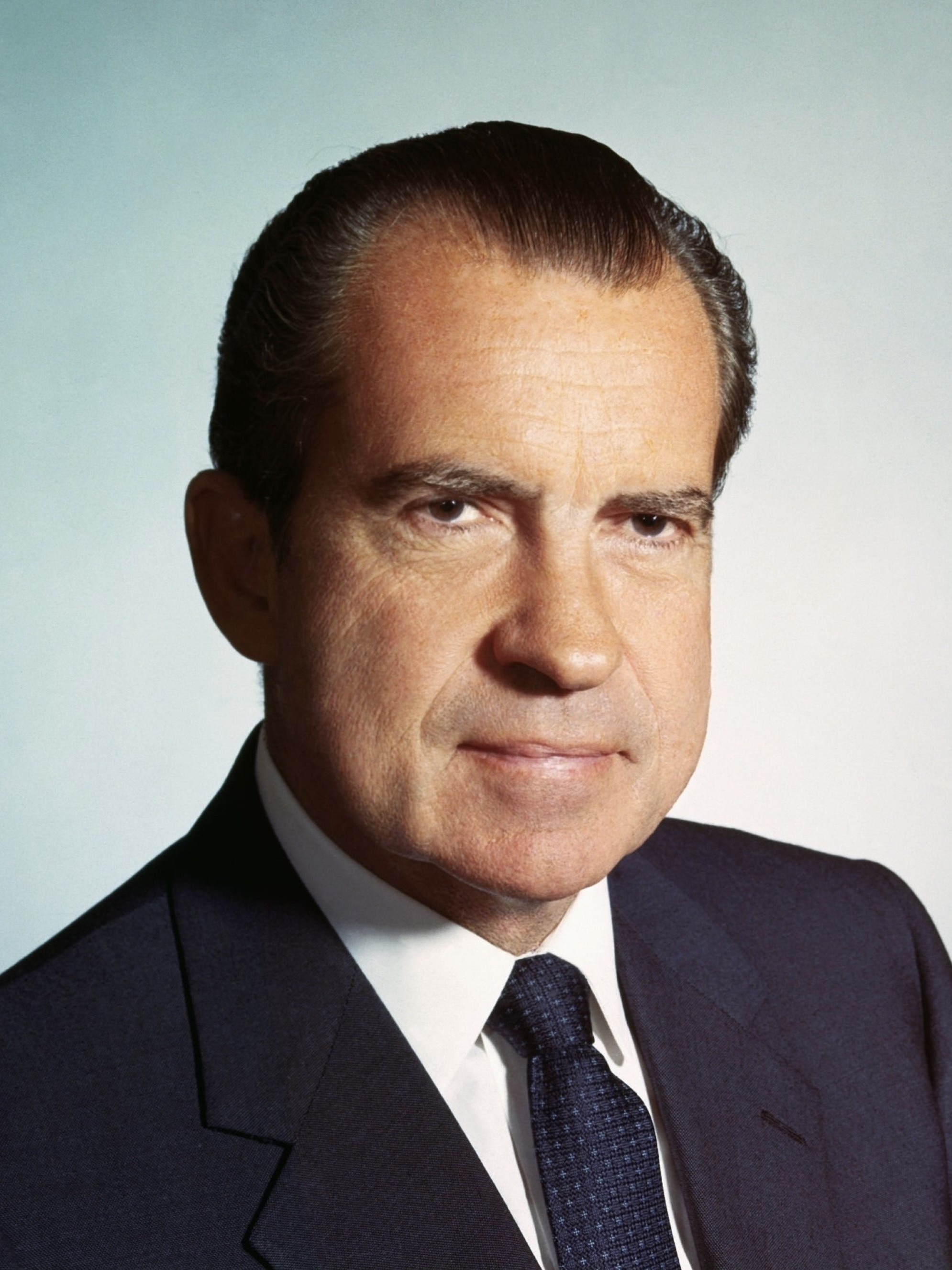

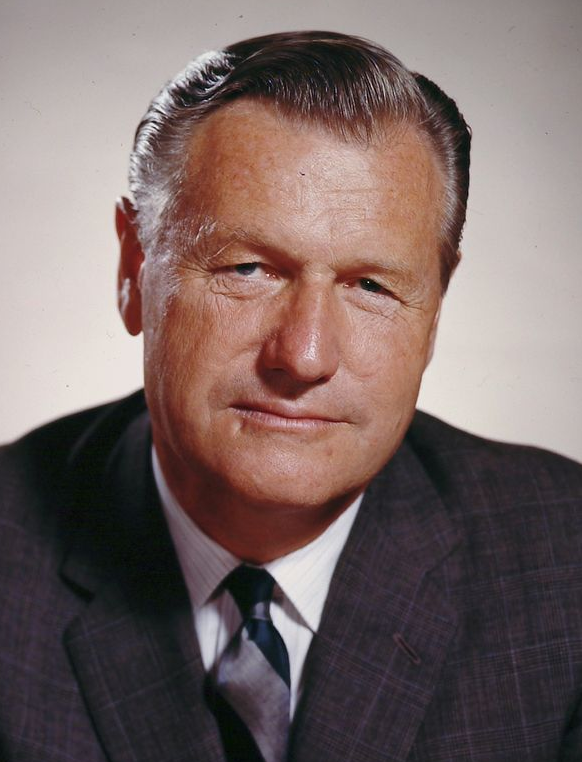
Candidate	Richard Nixon	Nelson Rockefeller (write-in)
Home state	New York	New York
Popular vote	80,666	11,241
Percentage	77.6%	10.8%
- County results Nixon

The 1968 New Hampshire Republican presidential primary was held on March 12, 1968, in New Hampshire as one of the Republican Party's statewide nomination contests ahead of the 1968 United States presidential election. While the nomination itself was contested, former Vice President Richard Nixon ran virtually unopposed in the Granite State, thus winning in a landslide. He defeated his nearest opponent, Nelson Rockefeller, (who was a write-in candidate) by 67 percentage points. Nixon would go on to win the GOP nomination, and the presidency.
