= Roy Elson =

American politician (1930–2010)

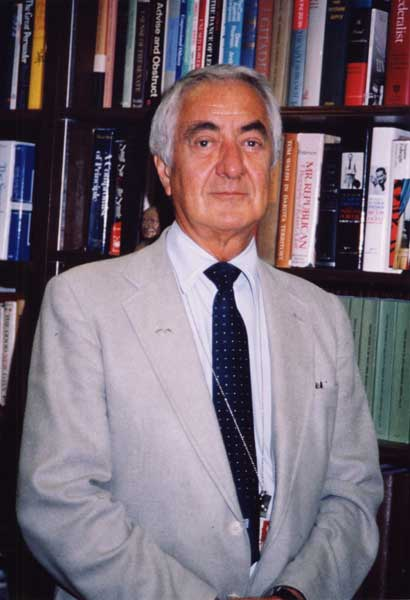
Roy L. Elson

Roy L. Elson (October 1, 1930 – February 25, 2010) was an American politician from Arizona, and a onetime aide and protégé of longtime U.S. Senator Carl Hayden (D-AZ). He was perhaps best known as the Democratic nominee for the U.S. Senate from Arizona in 1964 and 1968.

After graduating from the University of Arizona he joined the staff of Hayden in 1952 but was soon called into active duty in the air force during the Korean War. Returning to the Senate in 1955, he remained on the staff until Hayden retired. During his first bid, he ran for the seat held by Republican Barry Goldwater, who declined to seek a third term to seek the Republican presidential nomination in 1964. Goldwater lost to incumbent President Lyndon B. Johnson. Despite Johnson's landslide victory and big gains for Democrats across the country, Goldwater narrowly carried his home state, and Elson lost the Senate race to Republican Governor Paul Fannin by a 51.4% - 48.6% margin.

Elson was nominated again in 1968, now for the seat being vacated by his boss, Carl Hayden, who by then was President pro tempore and dean of the Senate. Elson lost again, this time by a margin of 57.2% to 42.8%. The winner was Goldwater, who returned to the Senate for three more terms.

Elson then became a lobbyist for the National Association of Broadcasters.

His oldest brother was Edward L.R. Elson, who served as Chaplain of the United States Senate from 1969 to 1981.

== See also ==
- United States Senate elections, 1964
- United States Senate elections, 1968

Party political offices
Preceded by Ernest McFarland	Democratic nominee for U.S. Senator from Arizona (Class 1); 1964	Succeeded by Sam Grossman
Preceded by Carl Hayden	Democratic nominee for U.S. Senator from Arizona (Class 3); 1968	Succeeded by Jonathan Marshall
