= 1956 United States Senate election in Arizona =

- November 6, 1956
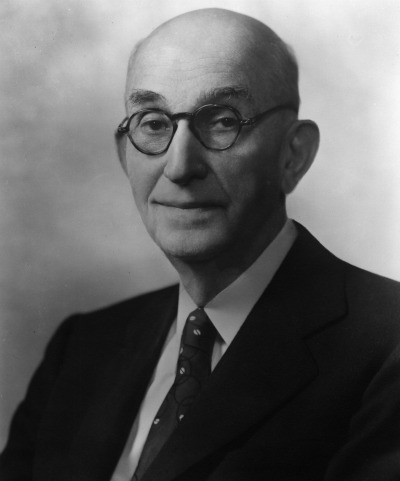

Nominee	Carl Hayden	Ross F. Jones
Party	Democratic	Republican
Popular vote	170,816	107,447
Percentage	61.39%	38.61%
- County results Hayden: 50–60% 60–70% 70–80% 80–90%
U.S. senator before election
Carl Hayden
Democratic
Elected U.S. Senator
Carl Hayden
Democratic

The 1956 United States Senate election in Arizona took place on November 6, 1956. Incumbent Democratic U.S. Senator Carl Hayden ran for reelection to a sixth term, defeating Republican nominee Attorney General of Arizona Ross F. Jones in the general election.

== Democratic primary ==
=== Candidates ===
- Carl T. Hayden, incumbent U.S. Senator
- Robert E. Miller, candidate for U.S. Senate in 1938, 1940, 1950

=== Results ===
Democratic primary results
Party	Candidate	Votes	%
Democratic	Carl T. Hayden (incumbent)	99,859	82.4%
Democratic	Robert E. Miller	21,370	17,6%
Total votes		121,229	100.0

== Republican primary ==
=== Candidates ===
- Ross F. Jones, Attorney General of Arizona
- Albert H. Mackenzie, attorney

=== Results ===
Republican primary results
Party	Candidate	Votes	%
Republican	Ross F. Jones	31,246	79.3%
Republican	Albert H. Mackenzie	8,147	20.9%
Total votes		39,393	100.0

== General election ==
United States Senate election in Arizona, 1956
Party	Candidate	Votes	%	±%
Democratic	Carl T. Hayden (incumbent)	170,816	61.39%	−1.41%
Republican	Ross F. Jones	107,447	38.61%	+1.41%
Majority		63,369	22.77%	−2.84%
Turnout		278,263		
Democratic hold		Swing		

== See also ==
- 1956 United States Senate elections
