= 1970 United States Senate election in Arizona =

- November 3, 1970
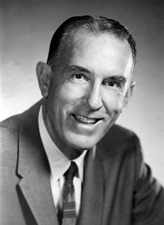

| Nominee | Paul Fannin | Sam Grossman |
| Party | Republican | Democratic |
| Popular vote | 228,284 | 179,512 |
| Percentage | 55.98% | 44.02% |
- County results Fannin: 50–60% 60–70% Grossman: 50–60% 60–70% 70–80%
U.S. senator before election
Paul Fannin
Republican
Elected U.S. Senator
Paul Fannin
Republican

The 1970 United States Senate election in Arizona took place on November 3, 1970. Incumbent Republican U.S. Senator Paul Fannin decided to run for reelection to a second term, running unopposed in the Republican primary. Fannin defeated Democratic nominee Sam Grossman in the general election. This was the last time until 1994 that Republicans won Arizona's Class 1 Senate Seat.

== Republican primary ==
=== Candidates ===
- Paul Fannin, incumbent U.S. Senator

== Democratic primary ==
=== Candidates ===
- Sam Grossman, businessman
- John Kruglick, doctor
- H. L. Kelly

=== Results ===
Democratic primary results
| Party | Candidate | Votes | % |
|---|---|---|---|
| Democratic | Sam Grossman | 78,006 | 65.2% |
| Democratic | John Kruglick | 27,324 | 22.9% |
| Democratic | H. L. Kelly | 14,238 | 11.9% |
| Total votes | | 119,568 | 100.0 |

== General election ==
United States Senate election in Arizona, 1970
| Party | Candidate | Votes | % | ±% |
|---|---|---|---|---|
| Republican | Paul Fannin (incumbent) | 228,284 | 55.98% | +4.55% |
| Democratic | Sam Grossman | 179,512 | 44.02% | −4.55% |
| Majority | | 48,772 | 11.96% | +9.11% |
| Turnout | | 407,796 | | |
| Republican gain from Democratic | | Swing | | |

== See also ==
- United States Senate elections, 1970
