= Fred O. Wilson =

American politician (1903–1983)

16th County Attorney of Navajo County
- In office January 1, 1961 – 1963
- Preceded by: Edwin R. Powell
- Succeeded by: John F. Taylor

11th Attorney General of Arizona
- In office 1949–1953
- Governor: Dan Edward Garvey
- Preceded by: Evo Anton DeConcini
- Succeeded by: Ross F. Jones

Personal details
- Born: July 24, 1903 Tempe, Arizona
- Died: July 30, 1983 (aged 80)

Fred O. Wilson (July 24, 1903 – July 30, 1983) was an American politician who served as the Attorney General of Arizona from 1949 to 1953.

== Early life and education ==
Fred O. Wilson, son of Edna Ozanne and Walter S. Wilson (1877-1964), was born in Maricopa County in 1903. Wilson attended Stanford University and was admitted to the United States Supreme Court bar on May 24, 1937.

== Career ==
From 1938 to 1942, he lived in Washington, DC and served as an assistant attorney for the Federal Security Agency. He then spent two years in Denver, Colorado working for the Agency as Assistant Regional Attorney. Moving to Arizona, he worked a in a number of government jobs including as an Assistant Attorney General at the Employment Security Commission and the Arizona Industrial Commission.

Wilson unsuccessfully ran for the Democratic nomination for Arizona Attorney General in 1944. He prevailed against Yale McFate in the 1948 Democratic primary. He then defeated his Republican challenger Laurens Henderson in the following election. In 1950, Wilson faced John Jacob Rhodes and won reelection. In 1952, Wilson defeated Robert Morrison in the primary but then lost the general election to Republican Ross F. Jones.

After his election defeat and subsequent bribery trial, Wilson went into private practice in Phoenix. In 1954, he moved to Show Low and became City Attorney.

In 1960, he was elected as Navajo County Attorney.

In 1962, he ran for a judgeship in Navajo County, but lost to Melvyn T. Shelley. He was succeeded as county attorney by John F. Taylor.

Wilson died on July 30, 1983.

=== Bribery trial ===
In 1953, Pima County Attorney Robert Morrison charged Wilson with bribery and conspiracy to violate the state's gambling laws. The trial venue was moved from Tucson to Yuma and took place in April 1953, with newly elected attorney general Ross F. Jones, county attorney Morris K. Udall, and Special Prosecutor Norman Herring forming the prosecution team. Maurice T. Gurney, claimed that Wilson offered Gurney $800 to $1,000 a month if he would allow a friend of his to operate gambling in Pima county. Wilson denied ever having a meeting with Gurney and testified: "As God is my Judge, I never had a meeting with Gurney except for saying a few words to him in the sheriff's office and seeing him once in the Elks Club."

Wilson was acquitted.
