= 1958 Arizona gubernatorial election =

- November 4, 1958
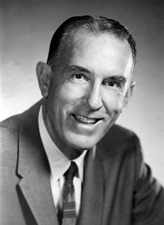

Nominee	Paul Fannin	Robert Morrison
Party	Republican	Democratic
Popular vote	160,136	130,329
Percentage	55.13%	44.87%
- County results Fannin: 50–60% 60–70% Morrison: 50–60% 60–70% 70–80%
Governor before election
Ernest McFarland
Democratic
Elected Governor
Paul Fannin
Republican

The 1958 Arizona gubernatorial election took place on November 4, 1958. Incumbent Governor Ernest McFarland decided not to run for reelection and instead unsuccessfully challenged U.S. Senator Barry Goldwater in attempt to return to the United States Senate.

Republican businessman Paul Fannin defeated Arizona Attorney General Robert Morrison in the general election, and was sworn into his first term as Governor on January 5, 1959, becoming Arizona's eleventh Governor.

== Democratic primary ==
=== Candidates ===
- Robert Morrison, Attorney General of Arizona
- Dick Searles, real estate agent
- Marvin L. Burton

=== Results ===
Democratic primary results
Party	Candidate	Votes	%
Democratic	Robert Morrison	77,931	50.36%
Democratic	Dick Searles	58,699	37.93%
Democratic	Marvin L. Burton	18,122	11.71%
Total votes		154,752	100.00%

== Republican primary ==
=== Candidates ===
- Paul Fannin, businessman

=== Results ===
Republican primary results
Party	Candidate	Votes	%
Republican	Paul Fannin	35,129	100.00%
Total votes		35,129	100.00%

== General election ==
=== Results ===
Arizona gubernatorial election, 1958
Party	Candidate	Votes	%	±%
Republican	Paul Fannin	160,136	55.13%	+14.68%
Democratic	Robert Morrison	130,329	44.87%	−14.68%
Majority		29,807	10.26%	
Total votes		290,465	100.00%	
Republican gain from Democratic		Swing	+29.36%	

=== Results by county ===
County	Paul Fannin Republican		Robert Morrison Democratic		Margin		Total votes cast
County	#	%	#	%	#	%	Total votes cast
Apache	1,309	52.57%	1,181	47.43%	128	5.14%	2,490
Cochise	5,617	47.49%	6,210	5.51%	-593	-5.01%	11,827
Coconino	3,802	59.83%	2,553	40.17%	1,249	19.65%	6,355
Gila	3,546	42.85%	4,730	57.15%	-1,184	14.31%	8,276
Graham	2,238	53.50%	1,945	46.50%	293	7.00%	4,183
Greenlee	1,162	28.45%	2,923	71.55%	-1,761	-43.11%	4,085
Maricopa	91,712	60.61%	59,593	39.39%	32,119	21.23%	151,305
Mohave	1,208	49.61%	1,227	50.39%	-19	-0.78%	2,435
Navajo	3,404	57.42%	2,524	42.58%	880	14.84%	5,928
Pima	29,460	48.48%	31,306	51.52%	-1,846	-3.04%	60,766
Pinal	5,261	48.32%	5,627	51.68%	-366	-3.36%	10,888
Santa Cruz	1,005	36.63%	1,739	63.37%	-734	-26.75%	2,744
Yavapai	5,751	61.85%	3,547	38.15%	2,204	23.70%	9,298
Yuma	4,661	47.15%	5,224	52.85%	-563	-5.70%	9,885
Totals	160,136	55.13%	130,329	44.87%	29,807	10.26%	290,465

==== Counties that flipped from Democratic to Republican ====
- Apache
- Coconino
- Graham
- Maricopa
- Navajo
- Yavapai
