= Evo Anton DeConcini =

American politician and jurist (1901–1986)

Justice of the Arizona Supreme Court
- In office January 3, 1949 – January 5, 1953
- Preceded by: None (new seat)
- Succeeded by: Dudley W. Windes

10th Attorney General of Arizona
- In office 1948–1949
- Governor: Dan Edward Garvey
- Preceded by: John L. Sullivan
- Succeeded by: Fred O. Wilson

Personal details
- Born: March 25, 1901 Iron Mountain, Michigan, U.S.
- Died: May 20, 1986 (aged 85) Tucson, Arizona, U.S.
- Party: Democratic
- Spouse: Ora Webster
- Education: University of Arizona

Evo Anton DeConcini (March 25, 1901 – May 20, 1986) was an American judge who served as Attorney General of Arizona, and a justice of the Arizona Supreme Court from 1949 to 1953.

== Life and career ==
Born in Iron Mountain, Michigan, DeConcini and his family soon moved to Wisconsin. He began studies at the University of Wisconsin in 1920, but his father's death in an automobile accident in February 1921 led to the family's relocation to Arizona, where DeConcini's father had purchased some properties.

Around 1928, DeConcini developed the Government Heights subdivision just south of the VA Hospital (now known as the Southern Arizona VA Health Care System) in Tucson, Arizona. He named the roads in the subdivision President and Lincoln streets and Washington, District and Columbia streets. In honor of President Abraham Lincoln and the U.S. capital Washington D.C. Washington Street was later renamed Palmdale Street.

After running various family businesses for a decade, he received a J.D. from the University of Arizona in 1932 and married Ora Webster, of Thatcher.

He was attorney general of Arizona from 1948 to 1949, and then served on the Arizona Supreme Court until January 5, 1953, when he was succeeded by Dudley W. Windes. Prominent attorney Daniel Cracchiolo served as law clerk to Arizona Supreme Court Justice Evo DeConcini in 1952.

In 2000, the newly built Federal Courthouse in Tucson, AZ was named in honor of Evo A. DeConcini.

He was the father of longtime Arizona Senator Dennis DeConcini and Dino DeConcini, a Federal DEA official.

Political offices
Preceded by John L. Sullivan	Attorney General of Arizona; 1948–1949	Succeeded by Fred O. Wilson
