= 1960 Arizona gubernatorial election =

- November 8, 1960
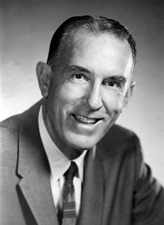

Nominee	Paul Fannin	Lee Ackerman
Party	Republican	Democratic
Popular vote	235,502	161,605
Percentage	59.30%	40.70%
- County results Fannin: 50–60% 60–70% Ackerman: 50–60% 60–70%
Governor before election
Paul Fannin
Republican
Elected Governor
Paul Fannin
Republican

The 1960 Arizona gubernatorial election took place on November 8, 1960. Incumbent governor Paul Fannin ran for reelection against former Democratic state representative Lee Ackerman in the general election, easily winning a second term. Fannin was sworn in to his second term on January 3, 1961. Both candidates ran unopposed in their respective party's primary.

== Republican primary ==
=== Candidates ===
- Paul Fannin, incumbent governor

=== Results ===
Republican primary results
Party	Candidate	Votes	%
Republican	Paul Fannin	51,769	100.00%
Total votes		51,769	100.00%

== Democratic primary ==
=== Candidates ===
- Lee Ackerman, former state representative

=== Results ===
Democratic primary results
Party	Candidate	Votes	%
Democratic	Lee Ackerman	120,142	100.00%
Total votes		120,142	100.00%

== General election ==
=== Results ===
Arizona gubernatorial election, 1960
Party	Candidate	Votes	%	±%
Republican	Paul Fannin (incumbent)	235,502	59.30%	+4.17%
Democratic	Lee Ackerman	161,605	40.70%	−4.17%
Majority		73,897	18.61%	
Total votes		397,107	100.00%	
Republican hold		Swing	+8.35%	

=== Results by county ===
County	Paul Fannin Republican		Lee Ackerman Democratic		Margin		Total votes cast
County	#	%	#	%	#	%	Total votes cast
Apache	1,653	55.43%	1,329	44.57%	324	10.87%	2,982
Cochise	7,614	51.13%	7,276	48.87%	338	2.27%	14,890
Coconino	5,565	62.92%	3,280	37.08%	2,285	25.83%	8,845
Gila	4,183	46.28%	4,856	53.72%	-673	-7.45%	9,039
Graham	2,531	55.33%	2,043	44.67%	488	10.67%	4,574
Greenlee	1,396	31.88%	2,983	68.12%	-1,587	-36.24%	4,379
Maricopa	135,757	63.50%	78,019	36.50%	57,738	27.01%	213,776
Mohave	1,701	58.66%	1,199	41.34%	502	17.31%	2,900
Navajo	4,068	57.94%	2,953	42.06%	1,115	15.88%	7,021
Pima	48,006	54.59%	39,932	45.41%	8,074	9.18%	87,938
Pinal	7,396	52.80%	6,612	47.20%	784	5.60%	14,008
Santa Cruz	1,605	51.56%	1,508	48.44%	97	3.12%	3,113
Yavapai	7,563	66.88%	3,746	33.12%	3,817	33.75%	11,309
Yuma	6,464	52.41%	5,869	47.59%	595	4.82%	12,333
Totals	235,502	59.30%	161,605	40.70%	73,897	18.61%	397,107

==== Counties that flipped from Democratic to Republican ====
- Cochise
- Mohave
- Pima
- Pinal
- Santa Cruz
- Yuma
