= Ross F. Jones =

American politician (1900–1979)

12th Attorney General of Arizona
- In office 1953–1955
- Governor: John Howard Pyle
- Preceded by: Fred O. Wilson
- Succeeded by: Robert Morrison

Personal details
- Born: August 25, 1900 LeRoy, Kansas
- Died: January 25, 1979 (aged 78) Phoenix, Arizona
- Party: Republican

Ross F. Jones (August 25, 1900 – January 25, 1979) was an American politician who was the attorney general of Arizona from 1953 to 1955.

== Education and career ==
Jones received his LLB and masters degrees from the University of Kansas City. In 1935, he moved to Arizona with his family and settled in Tucson. He later moved to Phoenix and joined the law firm Fennemore Craig.

Jones was attorney general of Arizona from 1953 to 1955. He defeated the incumbent, Fred O. Wilson, in the 1952 election but lost his re-election bid to Robert Morrison. In 1956, Jones ran for the U.S. Senate, losing to the incumbent Carl Hayden.

Jones became a Superior Court judge in Maricopa County for ten years until his retirement in 1970 for health reasons.

He died on January 25, 1979, in Phoenix at the age of 78 after a long illness. He was buried in Greenwood Memory Lawn Cemetery.

Party political offices
| Preceded by Bruce Brockett | Republican nominee for United States Senator from Arizona (Class 3); 1956 | Succeeded by Evan Mecham |
