= 1964 United States Senate election in Arizona =

- November 3, 1964
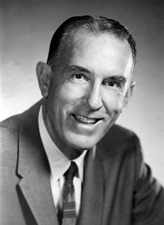

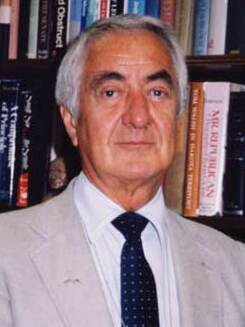
Nominee	Paul Fannin	Roy Elson
Party	Republican	Democratic
Popular vote	241,089	227,712
Percentage	51.43%	48.57%
- County results Fannin: 50–60% Elson: 50–60% 60–70% 70–80%
U.S. senator before election
Barry Goldwater
Republican
Elected U.S. Senator
Paul Fannin
Republican

The 1964 United States Senate election in Arizona took place on November 3, 1964. Incumbent Republican U.S. Senator Barry Goldwater decided not to run for reelection to a third term, instead running for President of the United States as the Republican Party nominee against president Lyndon B. Johnson. Arizona Governor Paul Fannin ran unopposed in the Republican primary, and defeated Democratic nominee Roy Elson, who was a staff member for U.S. Senator Carl Hayden until Hayden's retirement in 1969, after which Goldwater held that seat from 1969 to 1987.

Despite a landslide loss throughout the country, and Goldwater only able to obtain 50.45% of the vote in his home state of Arizona, Fannin managed to prevail in the state's Senate election.

== Republican primary ==
=== Candidates ===
- Paul Fannin, Governor of Arizona

== Democratic primary ==
=== Candidates ===
- Roy Elson, staff member to U.S. Senator Carl Hayden
- Renz L. Jennings, Justice of the Arizona Supreme Court
- Howard V. Peterson, lawyer
- George Gavin
- Raymond G. Neely, author
- Robert P. Ketterer

=== Results ===
Democratic primary results
Party	Candidate	Votes	%
Democratic	Roy Elson	76,697	41.4%
Democratic	Renz L. Jennings	64,331	34.7%
Democratic	Howard V. Peterson	22,424	12.1%
Democratic	George Gavin	10,291	5.6%
Democratic	Raymond G. Neely	6,022	3.3%
Democratic	Robert P. Ketterer	5,460	3.0%
Total votes		185,225	100.0

== General election ==
United States Senate election in Arizona, 1964
Party	Candidate	Votes	%	±%
Republican	Paul Fannin	241,089	51.43%	−4.63%
Democratic	Roy Elson	227,712	48.57%	+4.63%
Majority		13,377	2.85%	−9.26%
Turnout		468,801		
Republican hold		Swing		

== See also ==
- 1964 United States Senate elections
