= Paul Fannin =

Republican governor of and U.S. Senator from Arizona (1907–2002)

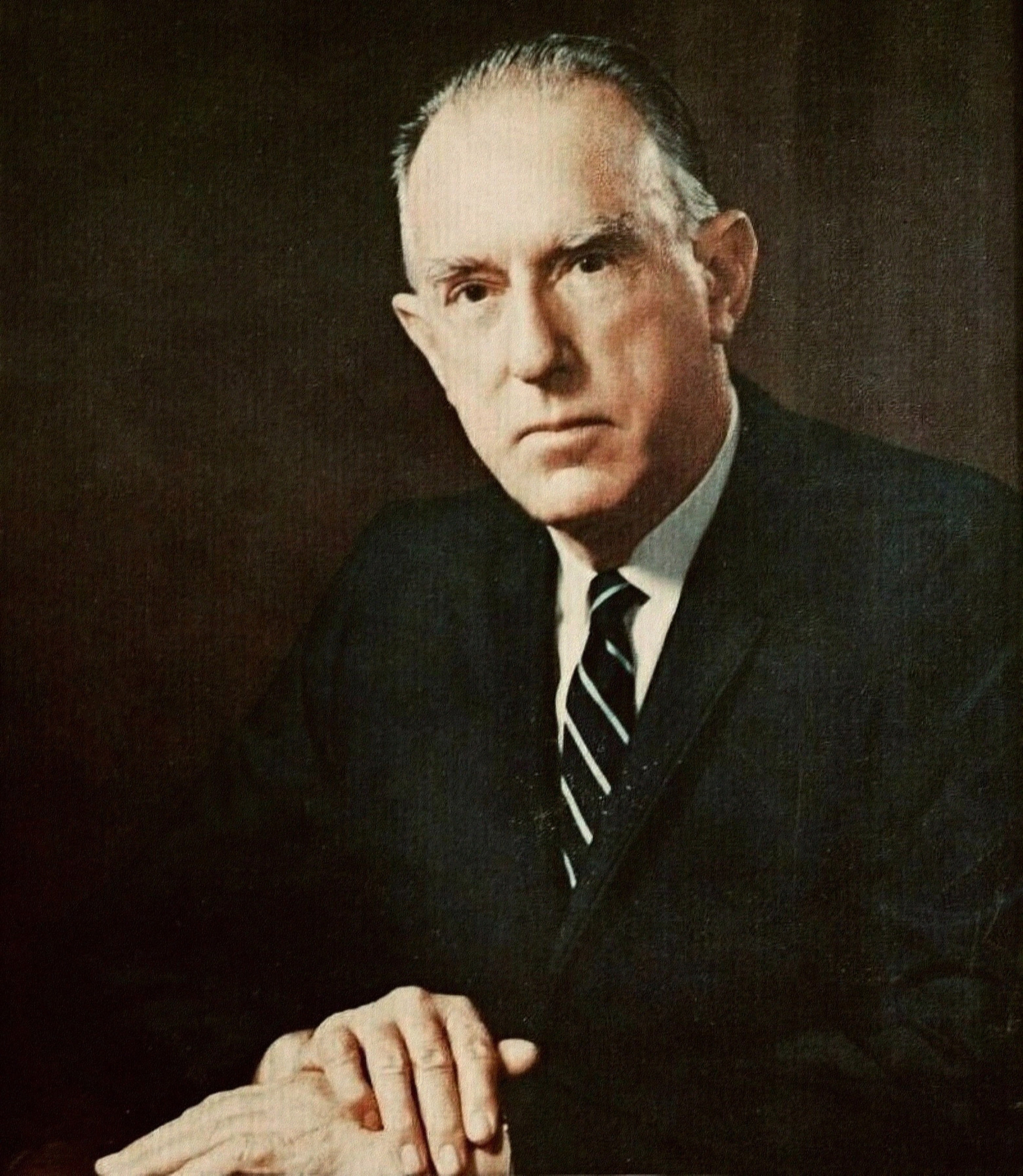

United States Senator from Arizona
- In office January 3, 1965 – January 3, 1977
- Preceded by: Barry Goldwater
- Succeeded by: Dennis DeConcini

11th Governor of Arizona
- In office January 5, 1959 – January 4, 1965
- Preceded by: Ernest McFarland
- Succeeded by: Sam Goddard Jr.

Personal details
- Born: Paul Jones Fannin; January 29, 1907 Ashland, Kentucky, U.S.
- Died: January 13, 2002 (aged 94) Phoenix, Arizona, U.S.
- Resting place: Greenwood/Memory Lawn Mortuary/Cemetery; Phoenix, Arizona
- Party: Republican
- Spouse(s): Lorenza Brown; Elma Addington
- Children: 4, including Bob
- Education: Stanford University (BA)

Paul Jones Fannin (January 29, 1907 – January 13, 2002) was an American businessman and politician. A Republican, he served as a U.S. senator from Arizona from 1965 to 1977. He previously served as the 11th governor of Arizona from 1959 to 1965.

== Early life and career ==
Paul Fannin was born in Ashland, Kentucky, to Thomas Newton and Rhoda Catherine (née Davis) Fannin. His father worked as a dairy farmer and also owned a harness shop. Fannin and his family moved to Phoenix, Arizona, when he was eight months old due to his father's health. He received his early education at Kenilworth Elementary School, and graduated from Phoenix Union High School in 1925.

Fannin attended the University of Arizona for two years before transferring to Stanford University, where he received a Bachelor of Arts degree in business administration in 1930. He then returned to Phoenix, where he joined his family's hardware business. He and his brother Ernest later established the Fannin Gas and Supply Company, a gas and petroleum equipment company. He served as president of the company from 1945 until 1956, when he and his brother sold the company.

In 1934, Fannin married Elma Addington, to whom he remained married until her death in 2001. The couple had one daughter and three sons, including Bob Fannin.

== Governor of Arizona ==
A conservative Republican, Fannin was elected Governor of Arizona in 1958, defeating Attorney General Robert Morrison by nearly 30,000 votes. He was sworn into office on January 5, 1959. He was re-elected in 1960 and again in 1962.

During his tenure, Fannin increased funding for the public school system by raising sales taxes, equalized property taxes, established the first medical school in the state, and created the Arizona-Mexico Commission to promote tourism and trade across the border. He also served as chairman of the Western Governors Association, as well as a member of the executive committee of Council of State Governors and of the National Civil Defense Advisory Council.

== U.S. Senator ==
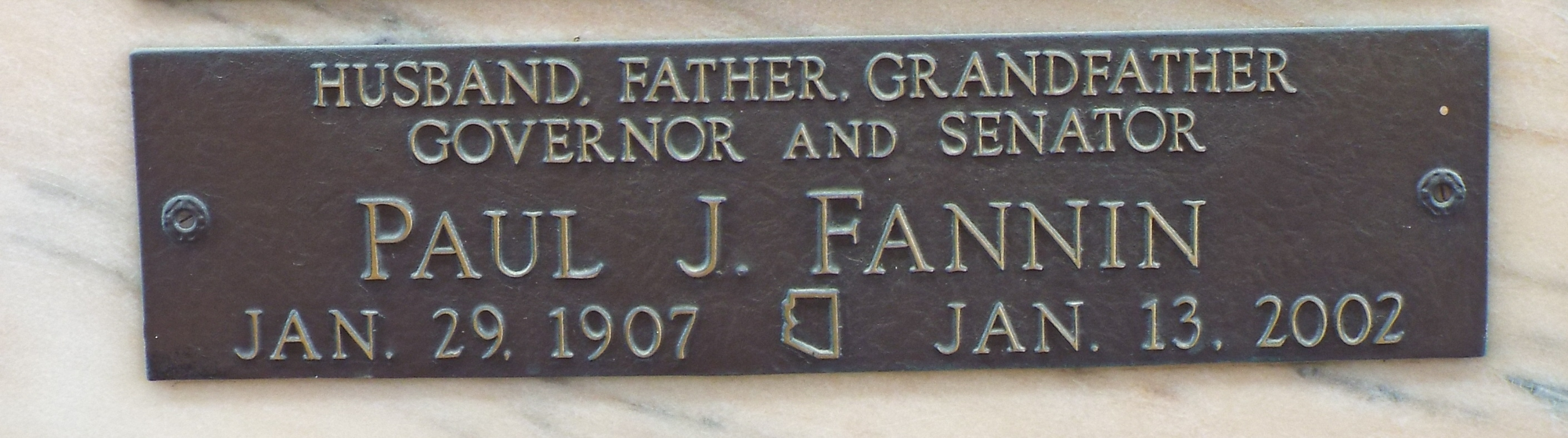
Crypt of Paul Jones Fannin

In 1964, when Senator Barry Goldwater declined to seek re-election in order to run for President of the United States, Fannin was elected to succeed him in the U.S. Senate. He defeated Democrat Roy Elson, an aide to Senator Carl Hayden, by a 51–49% margin. He was re-elected to a second term in 1970, receiving 56% of the vote. He did not seek re-election to a third term in 1976.

During his Senate career, Fannin was a hard-line conservative, often voting with Senator Goldwater on the issues, including his vote against the Equal Rights Amendment in 1972. As the ranking Republican on the Senate Interior Committee, he was a spokesman for Presidents Richard Nixon and Gerald Ford on energy policy; he opposed new limits on strip mining and tighter reins on federal lands. He also joined conservative Democratic Senators to preserve the clause of the Taft–Hartley Act that let the states decide whether to prohibit mandatory membership for workers in unionized shops. In 1968, he became the principal sponsor behind the Central Arizona Project, which diverted water of the Colorado River to central and southern Arizona.

Fannin voted for the Voting Rights Act of 1965, but did not vote on the confirmation of Thurgood Marshall to the U.S. Supreme Court. He voted against the Civil Rights Act of 1968.

During part of his tenure in the Senate, Fannin sat at the candy desk. He continued to live in Phoenix, Arizona, until he died of a stroke on January 13, 2002. He is buried at Greenwood/Memory Lawn Mortuary & Cemetery in Phoenix.

Political offices
Preceded by Ernest W. McFarland	Governor of Arizona; 1959–1965	Succeeded by Samuel Pearson Goddard, Jr.
U.S. Senate
Preceded by Barry Goldwater	U.S. senator (Class 1) from Arizona; 1965–1977; Served alongside: Carl Hayden, Barry Goldwater	Succeeded by Dennis DeConcini
Party political offices
Preceded by Horace B. Griffen	Republican nominee for Governor of Arizona; 1958, 1960, 1962	Succeeded by Richard Kleindienst
Preceded by Barry Goldwater	Republican nominee for U.S. Senator from Arizona (Class 1); 1964, 1970	Succeeded by Sam Steiger
