= Robert Morrison (politician) =

American attorney and politician (1909–1999)

13th Attorney General of Arizona
- In office 1955–1959
- Governor: Ernest McFarland
- Preceded by: Ross F. Jones
- Succeeded by: Wade Church

County Attorney of Pima County
- In office 1950–1951
- Preceded by: Bryce H. Wilson
- Succeeded by: Raul H. Castro

Personal details
- Born: March 16, 1909 Parlier, California
- Died: July 8, 1999 (aged 90) Tucson, Arizona
- Party: Democratic
- Education: University of Arizona (BA, LLB)

Robert Morrison (March 16, 1909 – July 8, 1999) was an American attorney and politician. He served as Attorney General of Arizona from 1955 to 1959.

== Early life and education ==
Morrison was born in Parlier, California. He worked as a farmer in California before relocating to Arizona during the Great Depression. He earned his bachelor's and law degrees from the University of Arizona.

== Career ==
He was elected Pima County Attorney in 1950, serving for one term. In 1952, Morrison unsuccessfully challenged Fred O. Wilson in the Democratic primary for Arizona Attorney General. Shortly after the election, Morrison participated in the prosecution of his primary opponent Wilson during the latter's 1953 bribery trial. Morrison would run again in the 1954 election, defeating Democrat Jack Choisser and incumbent Ross F. Jones. In 1958, Morrison unsuccessfully ran for governor, losing to Paul Fannin. He died in Tucson, Arizona on July 8, 1999 of a massive heart attack at 90.
