= Electoral history of Barry Goldwater =

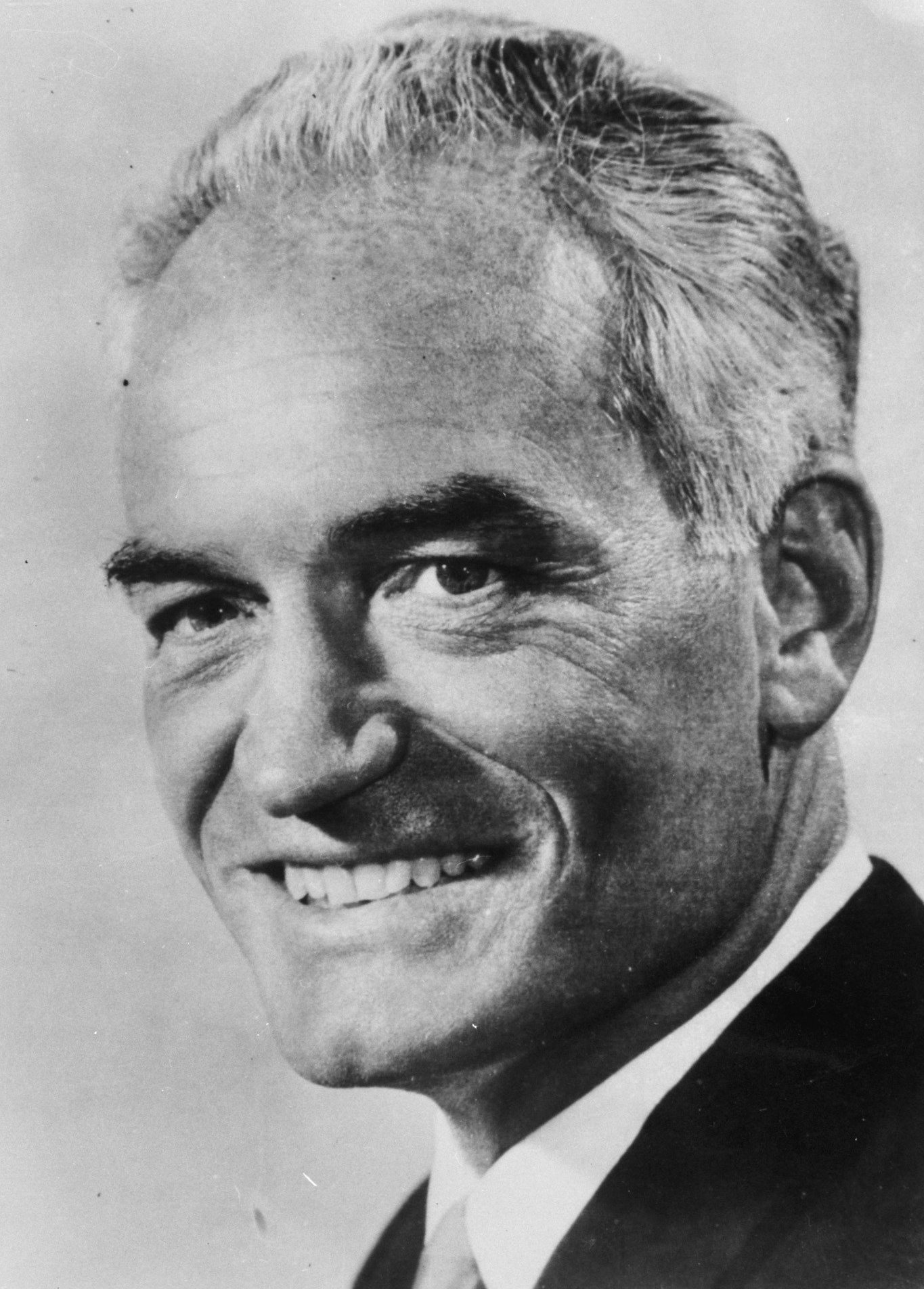
Barry Goldwater

Electoral history of Barry Goldwater, United States Senator from Arizona (1953–1965, 1969–1987) and Republican Party nominee for President of the United States during 1964 election

Phoenix City Council, At-large district, 1949:

Elected:

- Barry Goldwater – 16,405 (17.3%)
- Harry Rosenzweig – 14,887 (15.7%)
- Margaret B. Kober – 14,498 (15.3%)
- Frank G. Murphy – 13,598 (14.4%)
- Charles N. Walters – 12,838 (13.6%)
- Hohen Foster – 12,556 (13.3%)

Defeated:

- Rocky Ford – 4,678 (4.9%)
- Tony Grosso – 3,000 (3.2%)
- James H. Kerby – 2,177 (2.3%)

Phoenix City Council, At-large district, 1951:

Elected:

- Hohen Foster (inc.)
- Barry Goldwater (inc.)
- Margaret B. Kober (inc.)
- Frank G. Murphy (inc.)
- Harry Rosenzweig (inc.)
- Charles N. Walters (inc.)

Defeated:

- A.J. Beaty
- Guz Rodriguez
- Charles Romaine
- Calvin R. Sanders
- John W. Strode
- James A. Tilley Sr.

Republican primary for the United States Senator (class 1) from Arizona, 1952:

- Barry Goldwater – 33,460 (91.0%)
- Lester K. Kahl – 3,297 (9.0%)

United States Senate election in Arizona, 1952:

- Barry Goldwater (R) – 132,063 (51.3%)
- Ernest McFarland (D) (inc.) – 125,338 (48.7%)

United States Senate election in Arizona, 1958:

- Barry Goldwater (R) (inc.) – 164,593 (56.1%)
- Ernest McFarland (D) – 129,030 (43.9%)

1960 Republican presidential primaries:

- Richard Nixon – 4,975,938 (86.6%)
- Unpledged – 314,234 (5.5%)
- George H. Bender – 211,090 (3.7%)
- Cecil H. Underwood – 123,756 (2.2%)
- James M. Lloyd – 48,461 (0.8%)
- Nelson Rockefeller – 30,639 (0.5%)
- Frank R. Beckwith – 19,677 (0.3%)
- John F. Kennedy – 12,817 (0.2%)
- Barry Goldwater – 3,146 (0.1%)
- Paul C. Fisher – 3,146 (0.1%)
- Henry Cabot Lodge Jr. – 514 (0.0%)
- Dwight D. Eisenhower (inc.) – 172 (0.0%)
- Styles Bridges – 108 (0.0%)

1960 Republican National Convention (presidential tally):

- Richard Nixon – 1,321 (99.3%)
- Barry Goldwater – 10 (0.7%)

1960 United States presidential election:

- John F. Kennedy/Lyndon B. Johnson (D) – 34,220,984 (49.7%) and 303 electoral votes (22 states carried)
- Richard Nixon/Henry Cabot Lodge Jr. (R) – 34,108,157 (49.6%) and 219 electoral votes (27 states carried)
- Harry F. Byrd/Strom Thurmond (I) – 286,359 (0.4%) and 14 electoral votes (2 states carried)
- Harry F. Byrd/Barry Goldwater (I) – 1 electoral vote (Oklahoma faithless elector)
- Orval Faubus/John G. Crommelin (National States' Rights) – 44,984 (0.1%)
- Charles L. Sullivan/Merritt Curtis (CST) – 18,162 (0.0%)

1960 presidential election

1964 Republican presidential primaries:

- Barry Goldwater – 2,267,079 (38.3%)
- Nelson Rockefeller – 1,304,204 (22.1%)
- James A. Rhodes – 615,754 (10.4%)
- Henry Cabot Lodge Jr. – 386,661 (6.5%)
- John W. Byrnes – 299,612 (5.1%)
- William Scranton – 245,401 (4.2%)
- Margaret Chase Smith – 227,007 (3.8%)
- Richard Nixon – 197,212 (3.3%)
- Unpledged – 173,652 (2.9%)
- Harold Stassen – 114,083 (1.9%)

1964 Republican primaries results by state: No primary held John W. Byrnes Barry Goldwater Henry Cabot Lodge Jr. / James A. Rhodes Nelson Rockefeller William W. Scranton; Technically in South Dakota and Florida, Goldwater finished in second to "Unpledged Delegates," but he finished before all other candidates.

1964 Republican National Convention (presidential tally):

- Barry Goldwater – 883 (67.5%)
- William Scranton – 214 (16.4%)
- Nelson Rockefeller – 114 (8.7%)
- George W. Romney – 41 (3.1%)
- Margaret Chase Smith – 27 (2.1%)
- Walter Judd – 22 (1.7%)
- Hiram Fong – 5 (0.4%)
- Henry Cabot Lodge Jr. – 2 (0.2%)

1964 presidential elections

1964 United States presidential election:

- Lyndon B. Johnson/Hubert Humphrey (D) – 43,127,041 (61.1%) and 486 electoral votes (44 states and D.C. carried)
- Barry Goldwater/William E. Miller (R) – 27,175,754 (38.5%) and 52 electoral votes (6 states carried)
- Unpledged electors (D) – 210,732 (0.3%)

United States Senate election in Arizona, 1968:

- Barry Goldwater (R) – 274,607 (57.2%)
- Roy Elson (D) – 205,338 (42.8%)

United States Senate election in Arizona, 1974:

- Barry Goldwater (R) (inc.) – 320,396 (58.3%)
- Jonathan Marshall (D) – 229,523 (41.7%)

United States Senate election in Arizona, 1980:

- Barry Goldwater (R) (inc.) – 432,371 (49.5%)
- Bill Schultz (D) – 422,972 (48.4%)
- Fred R. Esser (Libertarian) – 12,008 (1.4%)
- Lorenzo Torrez (People over Politics) – 3,608 (0.4%)
- Josefina Otero (Socialist Workers) – 3,266 (0.4%)
