= James McClintock =

James McClintock may refer to:

- James B. McClintock, American professor of biology
- James H. McClintock (1864–1934), American historian and volunteer cavalry officer in Roosevelt's Rough Riders
