= Renz L. Jennings =

American judge (1899–1983)

Justice of the Arizona Supreme Court
- In office December 12, 1960 – August 5, 1964
- Preceded by: Robert O. Lesher
- Succeeded by: Edward W. Scruggs

9th County Attorney for Maricopa County, Arizona
- In office 1933–1934
- Preceded by: Lloyd Andrews
- Succeeded by: Harry Johnson

Member of the Arizona House of Representatives from the Maricopa County district
- In office January 1, 1931 – December 31, 1932

Personal details
- Born: August 5, 1899 Taylor, Arizona
- Died: February 11, 1983 (aged 83)
- Party: Democrat

Renz L. Jennings (August 5, 1899 – February 11, 1983) was a justice of the Supreme Court of Arizona from December 12, 1960, to August 5, 1964. Jennings twice sought the Democratic nomination for the United States Senate, losing in 1934 and 1964.

== Early life and education ==
Jennings parents died when he was young and he was raised by siblings. He served in the military during World War I. After the war, Jennings was one of seven people who passed the 1926 Arizona Bar Exam. In 1927, Jennings married Leola, a teacher and graduate of Tempe Normal. The couple had to keep the marriage a secret since at the time it was considered socially improper for a teacher to be married. Jennings attended Brigham Young University and the University of Arizona.

== Career ==
Jennings served as a Democratic member of Arizona House of Representatives from 1931 until 1932, representing Maricopa County in the 10th Arizona State Legislature.

Jennings was elected Maricopa County Attorney and served from 1933 until 1934. Jenning ran in Democratic primary for the United States Senate in 1934, losing to incumbent senator Henry Fountain Ashurst, with Jennings receiving 18.9% of the vote. Jennings took fourth in the 1941 Democratic primary for the United States House of Representatives, losing to incumbent John R. Murdock, with Jennings getting 8.2% of the vote.

Jennings was appointed as a judge to the Maricopa County Superior Court on January 29, 1949, serving until he was elected to the Supreme Court in 1960. Jennings defeated Republican incumbent Robert O. Lesher, with Lesher getting 61,210 votes to Jennings's 96,824. Jennings served as a justice of the Supreme Court of Arizona from December 12, 1960, to August 5, 1964. In 1964, he resigned from the Court to run for the Senate again, this time for the seat held by Barry Goldwater. Governor Paul Fannin appointed Edward W. Scruggs to fill the vacancy created by Jennings resignation. Jennings lost the 6-way democratic primary to Roy Elson.

While on the Supreme Court, Jennings appeared in the May 17, 1961, episode of I've Got a Secret as part of a "Trio of one-man bands," where Jennings played the guitar, harmonica, and drums at the same time.

== Death ==
Jennings died on February 11, 1983. While swimming he apparently had a heart attack and Leola, who did not swim, could not pull him out of the pool. Leola died on June 17, 2005, at age 101. They were members of the Church of Jesus Christ of Latter-day Saints.

== Publications ==
- Renz L. Jennings, The Boy From Taylor, Carthage Press (1977)
