= 1934 United States Senate election in Arizona =

- November 3, 1934
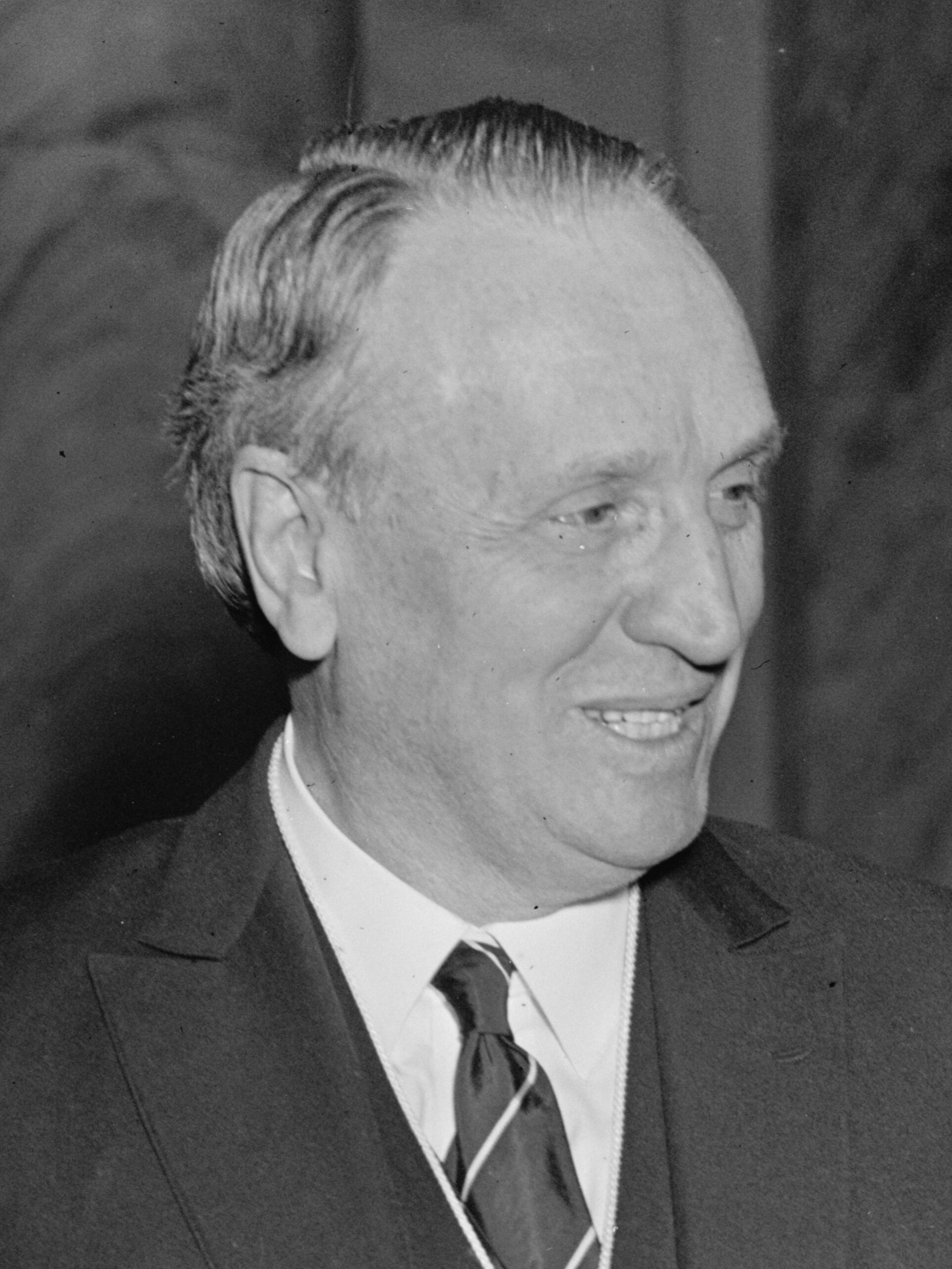

Nominee	Henry F. Ashurst	Joseph Edward Thompson
Party	Democratic	Republican
Popular vote	67,648	24,075
Percentage	72.03%	25.63%
- County results Ashurst: 60–70% 70–80% 80–90%
United States Senator before election
Henry F. Ashurst
Democratic
Elected United States Senator
Henry F. Ashurst
Democratic

The 1934 United States Senate elections in Arizona took place on November 3, 1934. Incumbent Democratic U.S. Senator Henry F. Ashurst ran for reelection to a fifth term, defeating Republican nominee Joseph Edward Thompson in the general election by a wide margin.

Thompson's candidacy came at an inopportune time, as President Franklin D. Roosevelt had just begun his first term, and with the country in the midst of the Great Depression, the Democrats were far more popular than the Republicans at the time. Additionally, Ashurst, who had served continuously as U.S. Senator since Arizona joined the union in 1912, presented an even greater challenge to anyone who would have hoped to defeat him for reelection, due to his seniority, and Thompson was fairly unknown in state politics, having never served in government prior to running for U.S. Senate.

Ashurst notably faced opposition in the Democratic primary, however, from former Secretary of State Sidney P. Osborn, who later became Governor of Arizona for several terms. This would be Ashurst's final electoral success, as he would lose the Democratic primary in 1940 to Ernest McFarland.

== Democratic primary ==
=== Candidates ===
- Henry F. Ashurst, incumbent U.S. Senator
- Sidney P. Osborn, former Secretary of State of Arizona
- Renz L. Jennings
- William Coxon, State Senator
- Charles H. Rutherford, candidate for U.S. Senate in 1926 and 1928

=== Results ===
Primary results by county: Ashurst: 30–40%; 40–50%; 50–60%

Democratic primary results
Party	Candidate	Votes	%
Democratic	Henry F. Ashurst (incumbent)	36,646	40.7%
Democratic	Sidney P. Osborn	24,065	26.7%
Democratic	Renz L. Jennings	16,743	18.6%
Democratic	William Coxon	8,653	9.6%
Democratic	Charles H. Rutherford	4,026	4.5%
Total votes		90,133	100.0

== Republican primary ==
=== Candidates ===
- Joseph Edward Thompson, businessman

== General election ==
United States Senate election in Arizona, 1934
Party	Candidate	Votes	%	±%
Democratic	Henry F. Ashurst (incumbent)	67,648	72.03%	+17.78%
Republican	Joseph Edward Thompson	24,075	25.63%	−20.12%
Socialist	Charles D. Pinkerton	1,591	1.69%	
Communist	Ramon Garcia	606	0.65%	
Majority		43,573	46.39%	+37.90%
Turnout		93,920		
Democratic hold		Swing		

== See also ==
- United States Senate elections, 1934
