= 1922 United States Senate election in Arizona =

- November 7, 1922
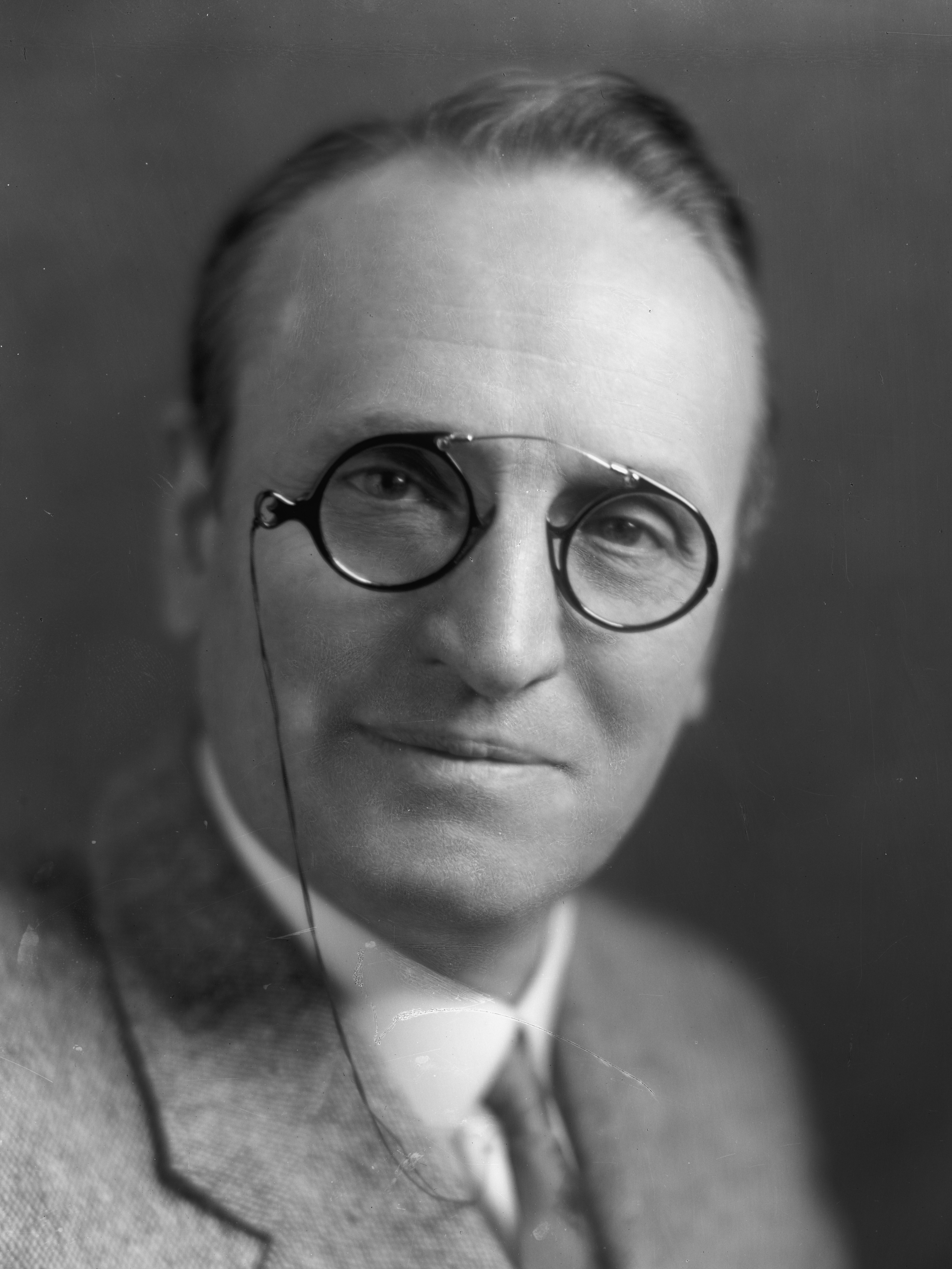

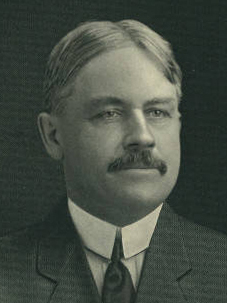
Nominee	Henry Fountain Ashurst	James H. McClintock
Party	Democratic	Republican
Popular vote	39,722	21,358
Percentage	65.03%	34.97%
- County results Ashurst: 50–60% 60–70% 70–80%
U.S. senator before election
Henry F. Ashurst
Democratic
Elected U.S. Senator
Henry F. Ashurst
Democratic

The 1922 United States Senate elections in Arizona was held on Tuesday, November 7, to elect one United States Senator. Democratic candidate United States Senator Incumbent Henry F. Ashurst ran for reelection to a third term, defeating Republican candidate James H. McClintock in the general election by a wide margin.

== Primary elections ==
Primary elections were held on September 12, 1922.

=== Democratic primary ===
==== Candidate ====
- Henry F. Ashurst, incumbent U.S. Senator

==== Results ====
Democratic primary results
Party	Candidate	Votes	%
Democratic	Henry F. Ashurst	30,408	100.00
Total votes		30,408	

=== Republican primary ===
==== Candidates ====
- James P. Boyle

==== Results ====
Republican primary results
Party	Candidate	Votes	%
Republican	James P. Boyle	839	100.00
Total votes		839	

Boyle resigned. The Republican State Central Committee selected James H. McClintock, State Historian to fill the vacancy.

== General election ==
United States Senate election in Arizona, 1922
Party	Candidate	Votes	%	±%
Democratic	Henry F. Ashurst (incumbent)	39,722	65.03%	+9.67%
Republican	James H. McClintock	21,358	34.97%	−4.43%
Majority		18,364	30.06%	+14.10%
Turnout		61,080		
Democratic hold		Swing		

== See also ==
- 1922 United States Senate elections

== Biography ==
- Kerby, James H. (1923). State of Arizona. Election Returns for Primary Election, September 12, 1922 and General Election, November 7, 1922. Mesa, Arizona: The Tribune Print.
