= 1928 United States Senate election in Arizona =

- November 6, 1928
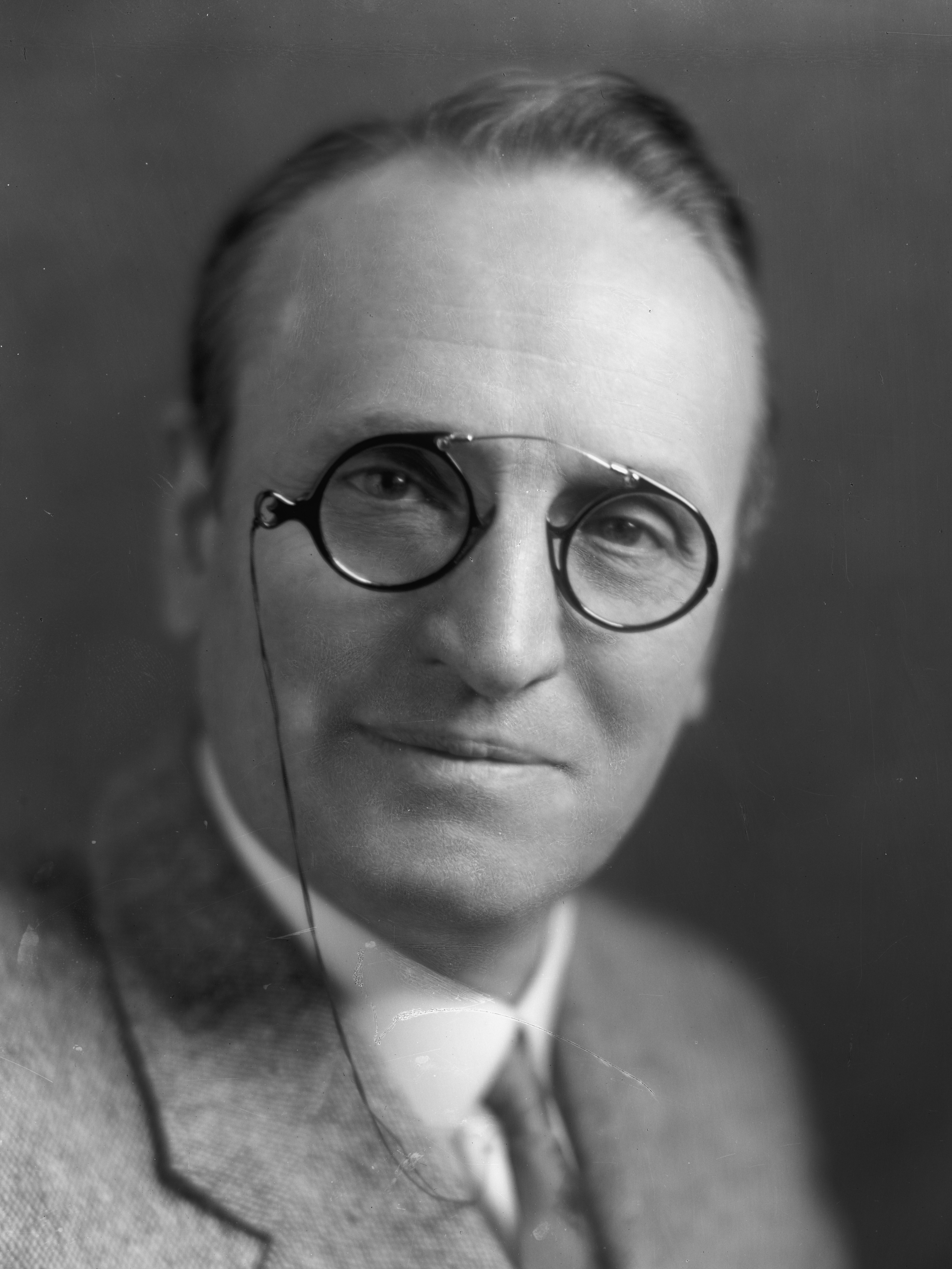

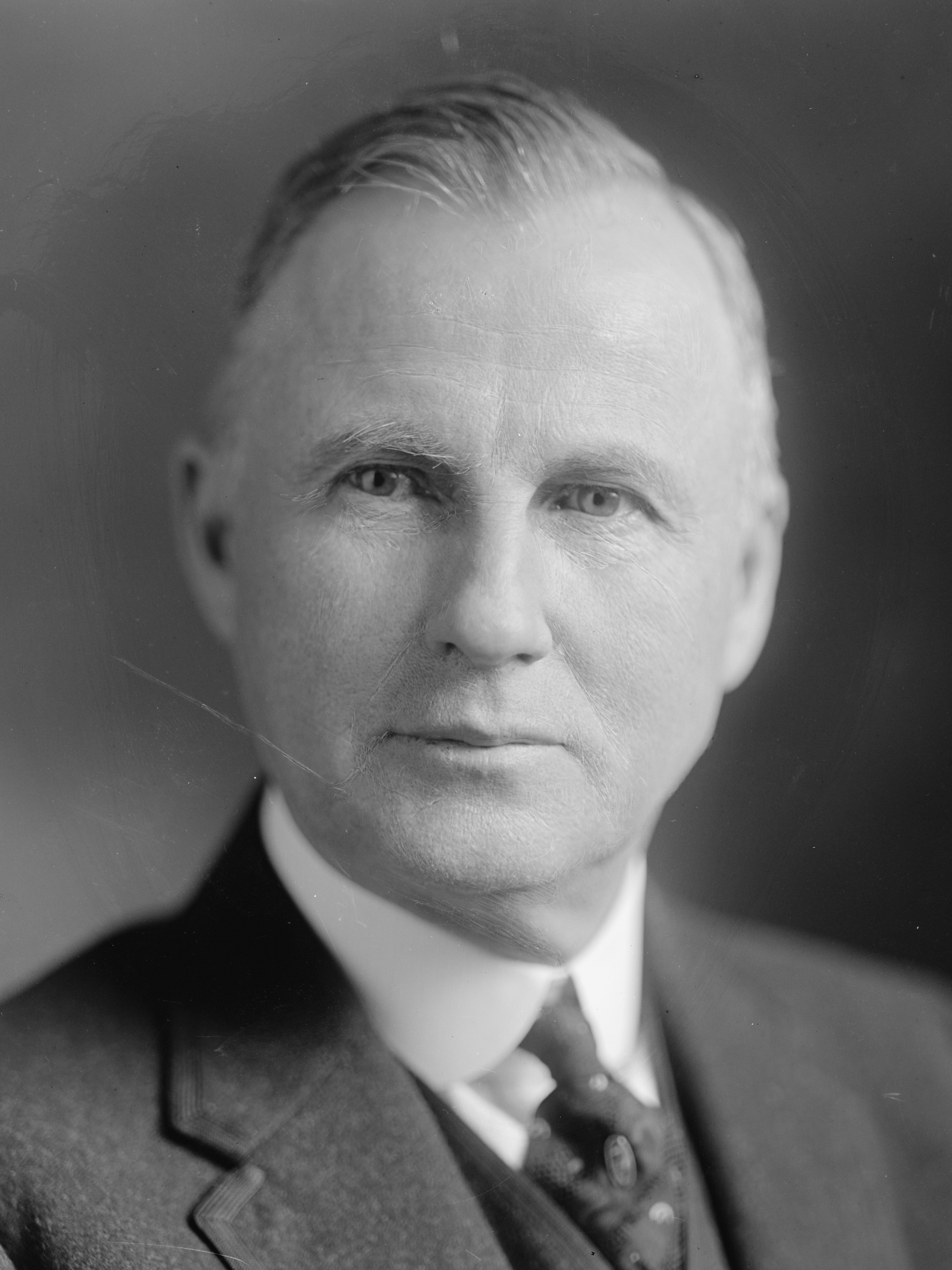
Nominee	Henry F. Ashurst	Ralph H. Cameron
Party	Democratic	Republican
Popular vote	47,013	39,651
Percentage	54.25%	45.75%
- County results Ashurst: 50–60% 60–70% 70–80% Cameron: 50–60%
U.S. senator before election
Henry F. Ashurst
Democratic
Elected U.S. Senator
Henry F. Ashurst
Democratic

The 1928 United States Senate elections in Arizona was held on Tuesday, November 6, to elect one United States Senator for the class 1 United States Senate seat to represent the State of Arizona. for one 6-year term, beginning January 3, 1929 and ending January 3, 1935. Democratic candidate United States Incumbent Senator Henry F. Ashurst defeated Republican nominee and former United States Senator Ralph H. Cameron in the general election. Cameron was defeated in the previous election year, in 1926, by then-U.S. Congressman Carl T. Hayden, leading Cameron to decide to challenge Ashurst in order to return to the United States Senate.

== Democratic primary ==
=== Candidates ===
- Henry F. Ashurst, incumbent U.S. Senator
- Charles H. Rutherford, candidate for U.S. Senate in 1926

=== Results ===
Democratic primary results
Party	Candidate	Votes	%
Democratic	Henry F. Ashurst (incumbent)	32,698	77.4%
Democratic	Charles H. Rutherford	9,547	22.6%
Total votes		42,245	100.0

== Republican primary ==
=== Candidates ===
- Ralph H. Cameron, former U.S. Senator
- Frank R. Stewart

=== Results ===
Republican primary results
Party	Candidate	Votes	%
Republican	Ralph H. Cameron	10,111	65.5%
Republican	Frank R. Stewart	5,322	34.5%
Total votes		15,433	100.0

== General election ==
United States Senate election in Arizona, 1928
Party	Candidate	Votes	%	±%
Democratic	Henry F. Ashurst (incumbent)	47,013	54.25%	−10.78%
Republican	Ralph H. Cameron	39,651	45.75%	+10.78%
Majority		7,362	8.49%	−21.57%
Turnout		86,664		
Democratic hold		Swing		

== See also ==
- United States Senate elections, 1928
