= Edward W. Scruggs =

American judge (1903–1974)

Justice of the Arizona Supreme Court
- In office August 5, 1964 – January 4, 1965
- Preceded by: Renz L. Jennings
- Succeeded by: Ernest McFarland

Personal details
- Born: June 14, 1903 Albuquerque, New Mexico Territory, U.S.
- Died: April 17, 1974 (aged 70) Tucson, Arizona, U.S.
- Party: Republican

Edward W. Scruggs (June 14, 1903 – April 17, 1974) was a justice of the Arizona Supreme Court from August 5, 1964 to January 4, 1965. Scruggs served the third shortest tenure in the court's history.

Scruggs was born in Albuquerque, New Mexico Territory and moved to Tucson with his parents as a child. Scruggs first worked as a laborer for the local railroad express company and in an automobile garage. Obtaining training as a stenographer, Scruggs found work with the U.S. immigration service in Tucson and then started working for the federal district court. Scruggs was admitted to the Arizona bar in 1933.

Scruggs served as clerk of the United States District Court in Arizona from 1936 until January 1946, serving under Judges W. H. Sawtelle, Fred C. Jacobs, Albert M. Sames, David Ling, and Howard Speakman. After leaving the federal court clerk, Scruggs started his own law practice in Tucson.

In 1947, Scruggs was a Republican candidate for the Tucson city council, campaigning for "larger fire and police departments, more street paving, adequate water and sewer systems, and many other Improvements."

In 1953, Scruggs was the United States Attorney for the District of Arizona.

Governor Paul Fannin appointed Scruggs to fill the vacancy created by the resignation of Renz L. Jennings. Jennings retired to seek the Democratic nomination for U. S. senator. Scruggs sought reelection but faced former Senator and Governor Ernest McFarland who defeated Scruggs in the election.

Scruggs later became a special counsel to the Pima County Attorney's Office. He died in Tucson on April 17, 1974.
