= 1940 United States Senate election in Arizona =

- November 3, 1940
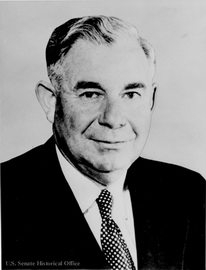

Nominee	Ernest McFarland	Irving A. Jennings, Sr.
Party	Democratic	Republican
Popular vote	101,495	29,657
Percentage	71.61%	27.98%
- County results McFarland: 60–70% 70–80% 80–90%
U.S. senator before election
Henry F. Ashurst
Democratic
Elected U.S. Senator
Ernest McFarland
Democratic

The 1940 United States Senate elections in Arizona took place on November 5, 1940. Incumbent Democratic U.S. Senator Henry F. Ashurst ran for reelection to a sixth term, but was defeated in the Democratic primary to challenger Ernest McFarland.

The twenty-eight-year Democratic incumbent, Henry F. Ashurst, appeared to be unbeatable and did not launch an aggressive campaign to retain his seat. While Ashurst remained in Washington, D.C., McFarland canvassed the state, giving speeches on water issues and World War II in Europe. He defeated Ashurst in the primary and went on to win the general election, defeating Republican challenger Irving A. Jennings.

== Democratic primary ==
=== Candidates ===
- Henry F. Ashurst, incumbent U.S. Senator
- Ernest McFarland, assistant attorney general of Arizona, judge of the superior court of Pinal County
- Henderson Stockton
- Robert E. Miller, candidate for U.S. Senate in 1938
- Erwin H. Karz, attorney

=== Results ===
Democratic primary results
Party	Candidate	Votes	%
Democratic	Ernest McFarland	63,353	56.64%
Democratic	Henry F. Ashurst (incumbent)	37,955	33.93%
Democratic	Henderson Stockton	5,220	4.67%
Democratic	Robert E. Miller	4,306	3.85%
Democratic	Erwin H. Karz	1,022	0.91%
Total votes		111,856	100.00

== Republican primary ==
=== Candidates ===
- Irving A. Jennings Sr.
- Burt H. Clingan, Republican nominee for U.S. Senate in 1938

=== Results ===
Republican primary results
Party	Candidate	Votes	%
Republican	Irving A. Jennings, Sr.	5,487	57.46%
Republican	Burt H. Clingan	4,062	42.54%
Total votes		9,549	100.00

== General election ==
United States Senate election in Arizona, 1940
Party	Candidate	Votes	%	±%
Democratic	Ernest McFarland	101,495	71.61%	−0.42%
Republican	Irving A. Jennings, Sr.	39,657	27.98%	+2.35%
Prohibition	A. Walter Gehres	579	0.41%	
Majority		61,838	43.63%	−2.76%
Turnout		141,731		
Democratic hold		Swing		

== See also ==
- United States Senate elections, 1940 and 1941
