= 1946 United States Senate election in Arizona =

- November 5, 1946
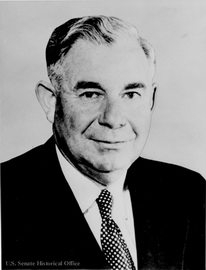

| Nominee | Ernest McFarland | Ward S. Powers |
| Party | Democratic | Republican |
| Popular vote | 80,415 | 35,022 |
| Percentage | 69.18% | 30.13% |
- County results McFarland: 60–70% 70–80% 80–90%
U.S. senator before election
Ernest McFarland
Democratic
Elected U.S. Senator
Ernest McFarland
Democratic

The 1946 United States Senate elections in Arizona took place on November 5, 1946. Incumbent Democratic U.S. Senator Ernest McFarland ran for reelection to a second term, easily defeating his Republican challenger Ward S. Powers in the general election.

== Democratic primary ==
=== Candidates ===
- Ernest McFarland, incumbent U.S. Senator
- Harry J. Valentine, Veterans' Service Officer

=== Results ===
Democratic primary results
| Party | Candidate | Votes | % |
|---|---|---|---|
| Democratic | Ernest McFarland (incumbent) | 61,287 | 79.5% |
| Democratic | Harry J. Valentine | 15,818 | 20.5% |
| Total votes | | 77,105 | 100.0 |

== Republican primary ==
=== Candidates ===
- Ward S. Powers

== General election ==
United States Senate election in Arizona, 1946
| Party | Candidate | Votes | % | ±% |
|---|---|---|---|---|
| Democratic | Ernest McFarland (incumbent) | 80,415 | 69.18% | −2.43% |
| Republican | Ward S. Powers | 35,022 | 30.13% | +2.15% |
| Communist | Morris Graham | 802 | 0.69% | |
| Majority | | 45,393 | 39.05% | −4.58% |
| Turnout | | 116,239 | | |
| Democratic hold | | Swing | | |

== See also ==
- United States Senate elections, 1946
