= 1916 United States Senate election in Arizona =

- November 7, 1916
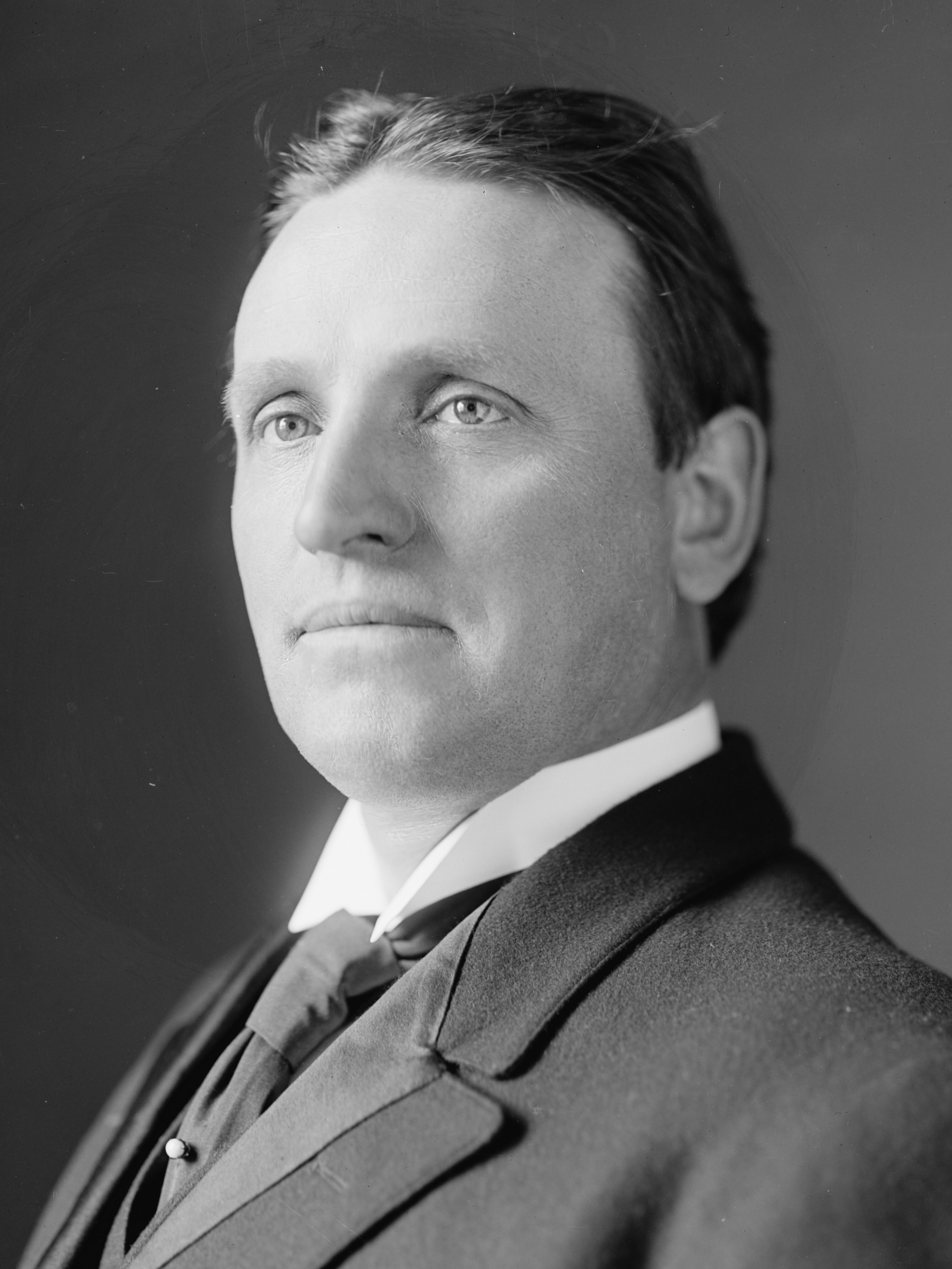

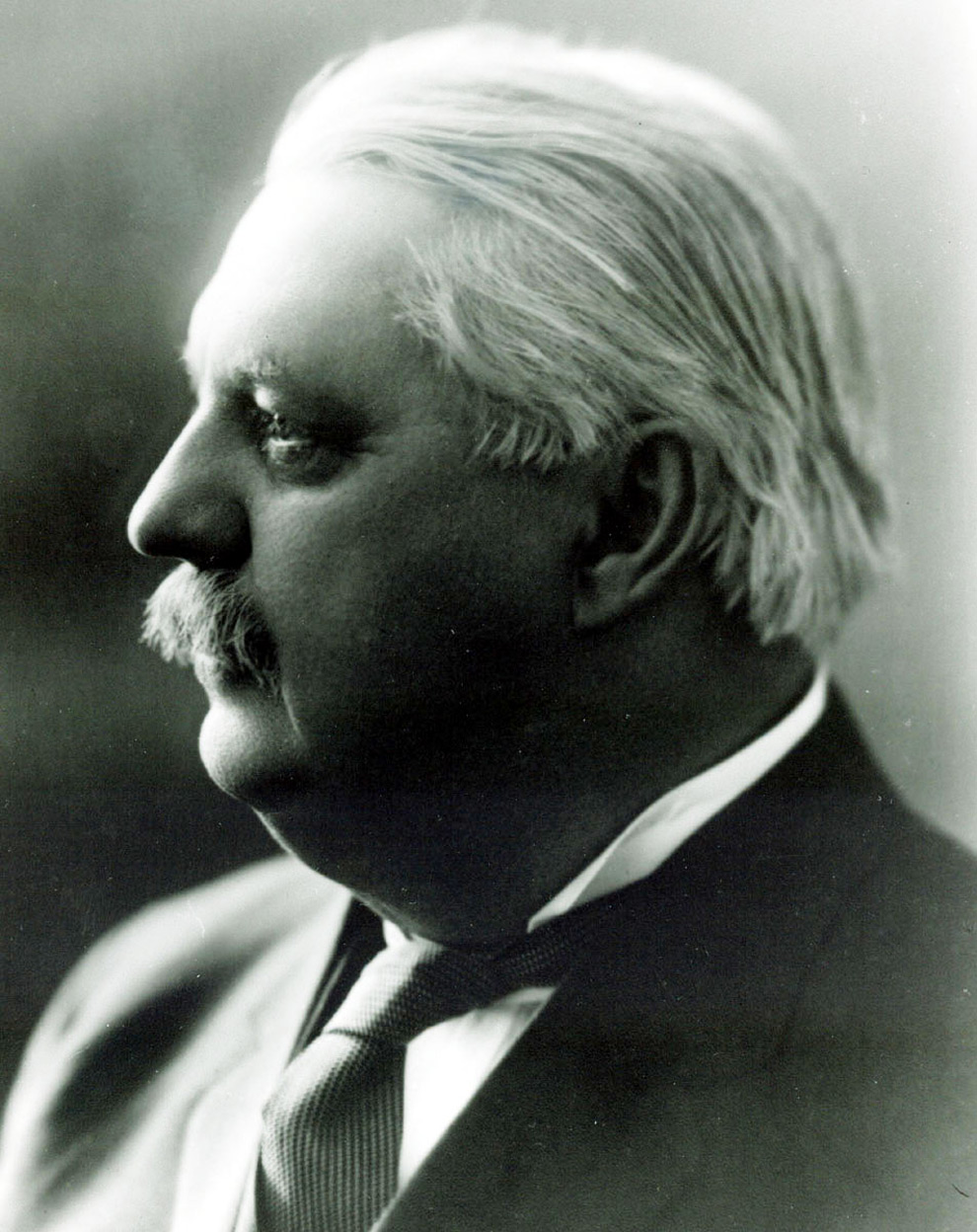

Nominee	Henry F. Ashurst	Joseph H. Kibbey	W. S. Bradford
Party	Democratic	Republican	Socialist
Popular vote	29,873	21,261	2,827
Percentage	55.36%	39.40%	5.24%
- Election results by county Ashurst: 40–50% 50–60% 60–70% Kibbey: 50–60%
U.S. senator before election
Henry F. Ashurst
Democratic
Elected U.S. Senator
Henry F. Ashurst
Democratic

The 1916 United States Senate elections in Arizona took place on November 7, 1916. Incumbent Democratic U.S. Senator Henry F. Ashurst ran for reelection to a second term, defeating Republican former Territorial Governor Joseph H. Kibbey in the general election by a comfortable margin.

== Democratic primary ==
=== Candidates ===
- Henry F. Ashurst, incumbent U.S. senator

== Republican primary ==
=== Candidates ===
- Joseph H. Kibbey, former territorial governor of Arizona
- William H. Stilwell, former associate justice of the Arizona Territorial Supreme Court

=== Results ===
Republican primary results
Party	Candidate	Votes	%
Republican	Joseph H. Kibbey	4,775	72.00%
Republican	William H. Stilwell	1,857	28.00%
Total votes		6,632	100.00

== General election ==
United States Senate election in Arizona, 1916
Party	Candidate	Votes	%	±%
Democratic	Henry F. Ashurst (incumbent)	29,873	55.36%	
Republican	Joseph H. Kibbey	21,261	39.40%	
Socialist	W. S. Bradford	2,827	5.24%	
Majority		8,612	15.96%	
Turnout		53,961		
Democratic gain from Republican		Swing		

== See also ==
- United States Senate elections, 1916 and 1917
