= 1952 United States Senate election in Arizona =

- November 4, 1952
- Turnout: 82.28% (registered voters)
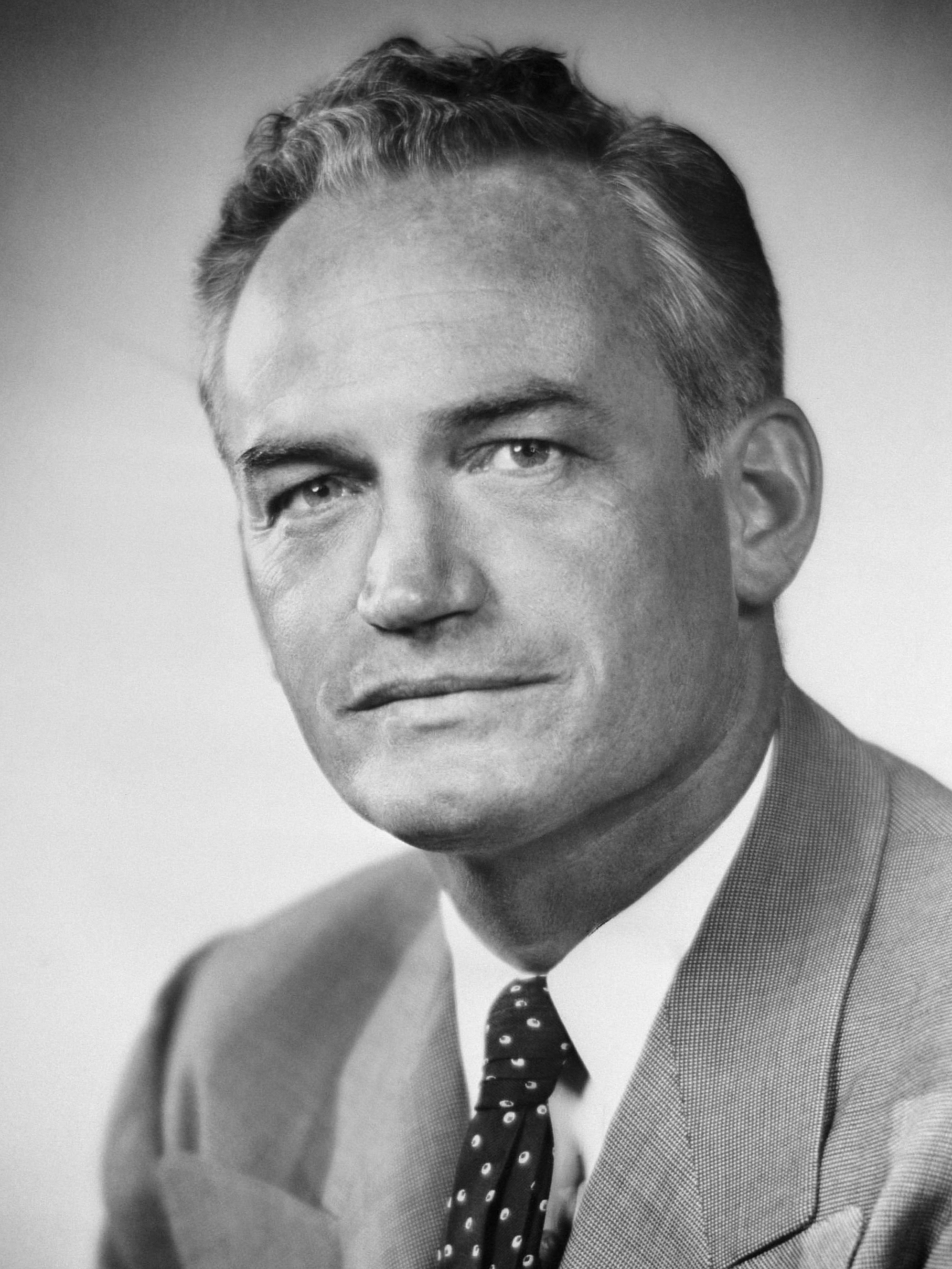

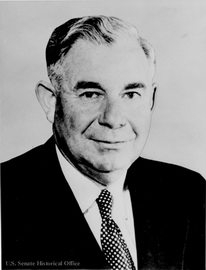
Nominee	Barry Goldwater	Ernest McFarland
Party	Republican	Democratic
Popular vote	132,063	125,338
Percentage	51.31%	48.69%
- County results Goldwater: 50–60% McFarland: 50–60% 60–70% 70–80%
U.S. senator before election
Ernest McFarland
Democratic
Elected U.S. Senator
Barry Goldwater
Republican

The 1952 United States Senate election in Arizona was held on November 4, 1952. Incumbent Democratic U.S. senator and Senate majority leader Ernest McFarland ran for re-election to a third term, but was defeated by the Republican nominee and future candidate for President of the United States, Barry Goldwater.

On Election Day, Goldwater defeated McFarland by a slim margin, winning by 6,725 out of approximately 260,000 votes cast, becoming the first Republican to win an Arizona U.S. Senate election since 1920. Goldwater, writing to Wisconsin senator Joseph McCarthy, said of the results, "The election victory was not entirely a surprise, because we knew that McFarland, carrying the weight of Truman's mistakes around his neck, would have a difficult time winning, particularly in view of the fact that I had spent nearly all of my life campaigning for this job, whether I realized it or not."

The election marked the end of the Senate career of Ernest McFarland, who was first elected in 1940 and had served as co-chairman of the Joint Committee on Navajo-Hopi Indian Administration in addition to Senate Majority Leader. He was later elected Governor of Arizona in 1954 and ran unsuccessfully for his former Senate seat in 1958. This was the second consecutive election in which a Senate party leader lost re-election.

This election would mark the beginning of a decades-long stretch of Republican electoral success in Arizona; Republicans would go on to continuously hold at least one of the state's Senate seats until 2020, when Democrats took control of both Senate seats in Arizona.

== General election ==
=== Candidates ===
- Barry Goldwater, Phoenix city councilman (Republican)
- Ernest McFarland, incumbent U.S. senator since 1941 (Democratic)

=== Campaign ===
After becoming a member of the Phoenix City Council in 1949, Barry Goldwater assumed a position as campaign manager of fellow Republican John Howard Pyle's successful 1950 bid for Governor of Arizona. After Pyle's narrow victory in the 1950 election, Goldwater began exploring the possibility of running for higher office himself and won re-election to his seat on the Phoenix Council by a comfortable margin. Goldwater's interest compounded in 1951, the same year he won re-election to his council seat, when Illinois U.S. Senator Everett Dirksen visited Phoenix. Goldwater, while at a cocktail party for Dirksen, was approached by the Illinois Senator, who encouraged him to run for Incumbent Democratic Senator Ernest McFarland's seat. Goldwater said later that he had estimated his chances at winning the election to be fifteen-to-one. Nonetheless, Goldwater began conducting research on McFarland and studied the election returns of Howard Pyle's 1950 gubernatorial victory, leading him to re-estimate his chances to be fifty-fifty.

Goldwater had been campaigning for several months before formally announcing his candidacy for McFarland's U.S. Senate seat on April 24, 1952. In his formal announcement, Goldwater cited six reasons for his entering the Senate race: his belief "that a life-long familiarity with the State of Arizona and its people and intensive study of the problems and needs of this region as a businessman and citizen qualifies me to represent efficiently our state in Washington," his opposition to the expansion of the federal government and belief in states' rights, his opposition to the New Deal and Fair Deal programs, his belief that a U.S. Senator should not be "a mere rubber stamp for any administration," and his opposition to the "present tragic trend toward the destruction of individual freedom."

The divisive race between Dwight Eisenhower and Robert A. Taft for the Republican nomination in the 1952 presidential race became cause for concern for state Republicans, Goldwater in particular. He confided to an associate of the Republican National Committee, Clarence Buddington Kelland, that he believed the Democrats were beginning to benefit from the "constant bickering" within the party. This, believed Goldwater, was the best-case scenario for the Democrats, including McFarland, who was hindered in his bid for re-election by the unpopularity of the Truman administration.

Originally believing he could run a campaign on his own with relatively few resources, Goldwater hired a campaign manager in June 1952, Stephen Shadegg, who had previously worked on the campaign of Democratic U.S. Senator Carl Hayden. Goldwater also received financial and logistical help from the Republican National Committee and the Republican Senatorial Campaign Committee, as well as additional financial backing from prominent Republicans, including Sid Richardson and H. L. Hunt, and easily defeated his sole opponent, Lester Kahl, in the Republican primary on September 8. Goldwater employed a general election strategy of focusing get out the vote efforts on the three northernmost counties of Arizona, inhabited primarily by the Navajo and Hopi Native American peoples. Feeling the margin would be close in the election results, Goldwater believed these efforts, especially efforts to organize a voter registration campaign in the northern counties, to be crucial for victory, writing to Everett Dirksen in May that "this might well be the margin of victory in this state."

=== Results ===
Arizona United States Senate election, 1952
Party	Candidate	Votes	%	±%
Republican	Barry Goldwater	132,063	51.31	+21.18
Democratic	Ernest McFarland (incumbent)	125,338	48.69	−20.49
Majority		6,725	2.61	−36.44
Turnout		257,401	82.28	+23.65
Republican gain from Democratic		Swing		

== See also ==
- United States Senate elections, 1952
- List of United States senators from Arizona
- Electoral history of Barry Goldwater
