= Frank G. Murphy =

46th mayor of Phoenix, Arizona (1895–1981)

46th Mayor of Phoenix Arizona
- In office 1954–1956
- Preceded by: Hohen Foster
- Succeeded by: Jack Williams

Personal details
- Party: Democratic

Frank Gleason Murphy (23 January 1895 – 13 January 1981) was an American politician who served as the 46th mayor of Phoenix, Arizona from 1954 to 1956.

== Early life ==
Murphy was born in Prescott, Arizona on 23 January 1895. Murphy's father, William Murphy, died in a mining accident while Murphy was 4 years old.
