= James B. McClintock =

American professor of biology

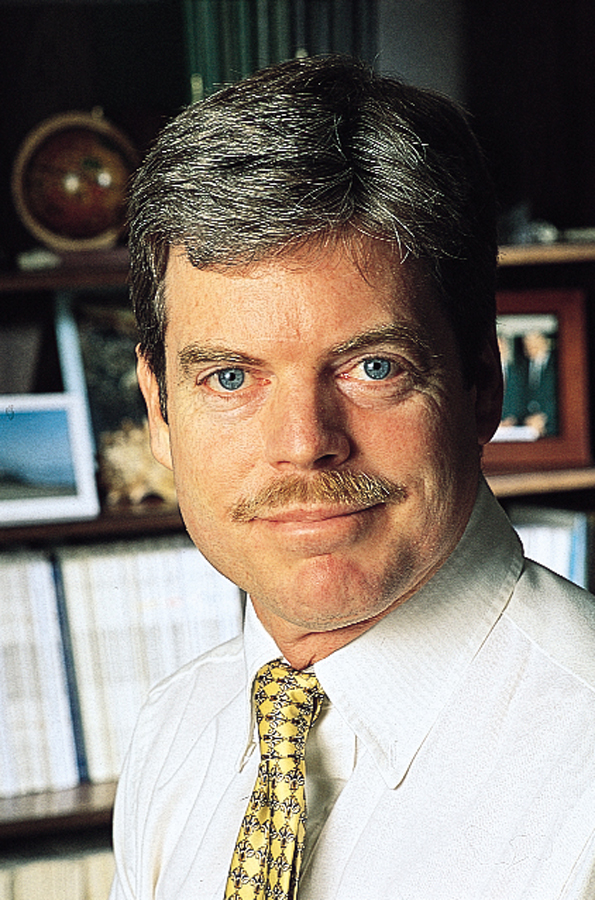
- James B. McClintock
- Born: Ann Arbor, MI US
- Education: University of California, Santa Cruz (B.S.); University of South Florida (PhD)
- Occupations: professor, Marine Biologist, Author
- Employer: University of Alabama at Birmingham
- Known for: Antarctic marine biology

James B. McClintock (born Ann Arbor, MI) is an American professor of biology at the University of Alabama at Birmingham and studies various aspects of marine biology in Antarctica.

== Early life and education ==
McClintock grew up in Santa Barbara, California. McClintock received his bachelor's degree from the University of California, Santa Cruz in 1978 and his PhD from the University of South Florida in 1984. In 1987, after completing a National Science Foundation Postdoctoral Fellowship at the University of California, Santa Cruz, he joined the faculty of the Department of Biology at the University of Alabama at Birmingham and is the Endowed University Professor of Polar and Marine Biology.

Since 1989 McClintock has led or co-directed fourteen scientific expeditions with the United States Antarctic Program (USAP) in which he and his research collaborators have become authorities on Antarctic marine chemical ecology. This work, funded by NSF, has been conducted at the United States research facilities McMurdo Station (Ross Sea) and Palmer Station (Antarctic Peninsula). McClintock has published over 200 scientific publications, and co-edited and co-authored several books on marine invertebrates. In 1998, the U.S. Geographic Board named McClintock Point on the north side of New Harbor, McMurdo Sound, Antarctica, in recognition of his contributions to Antarctic marine biology. In 1999 he was an elected Fellow in the American Association for the Advancement of Science.

== Current Work ==
His current work, also funded by the NSF, focuses on the impacts of climate change along the western Antarctic Peninsula (WAP). This region of the planet is experiencing unprecedented warming. Moreover, Antarctic seas are uniquely subject to the impacts of ocean acidification, the result of oceans absorbing anthropogenic atmospheric carbon dioxide (CO_{2}). Research projects are underway to examine how the combination of rising seawater temperatures and increased levels of ocean acidification may impact Antarctic marine plants and animals that have calcified body parts. A separate NSF-funded research program co-directed by McClintock involves an investigation of large populations of king crabs currently invading Antarctic shelf waters as sea temperatures rise and their prospective impacts on seafloor communities.

McClintock participates in educational outreach activities related to his work as an Antarctic marine ecologist. He is an appointed member of the Advisory Board of the E.O. Wilson Biodiversity Foundation.

In addition to participating in research expeditions, McClintock leads an annual educational tourist ship based Climate Change Challenge cruise to the Antarctica Peninsula. He also co-leads study programs to the Galapagos, Bahamas and Costa Rica as part of his teaching activities at UAB. He is the author of A Naturalist Goes Fishing, published by St. Martin's Press (2015).
