= Henry F. Ashurst =

American politician (1874–1962)

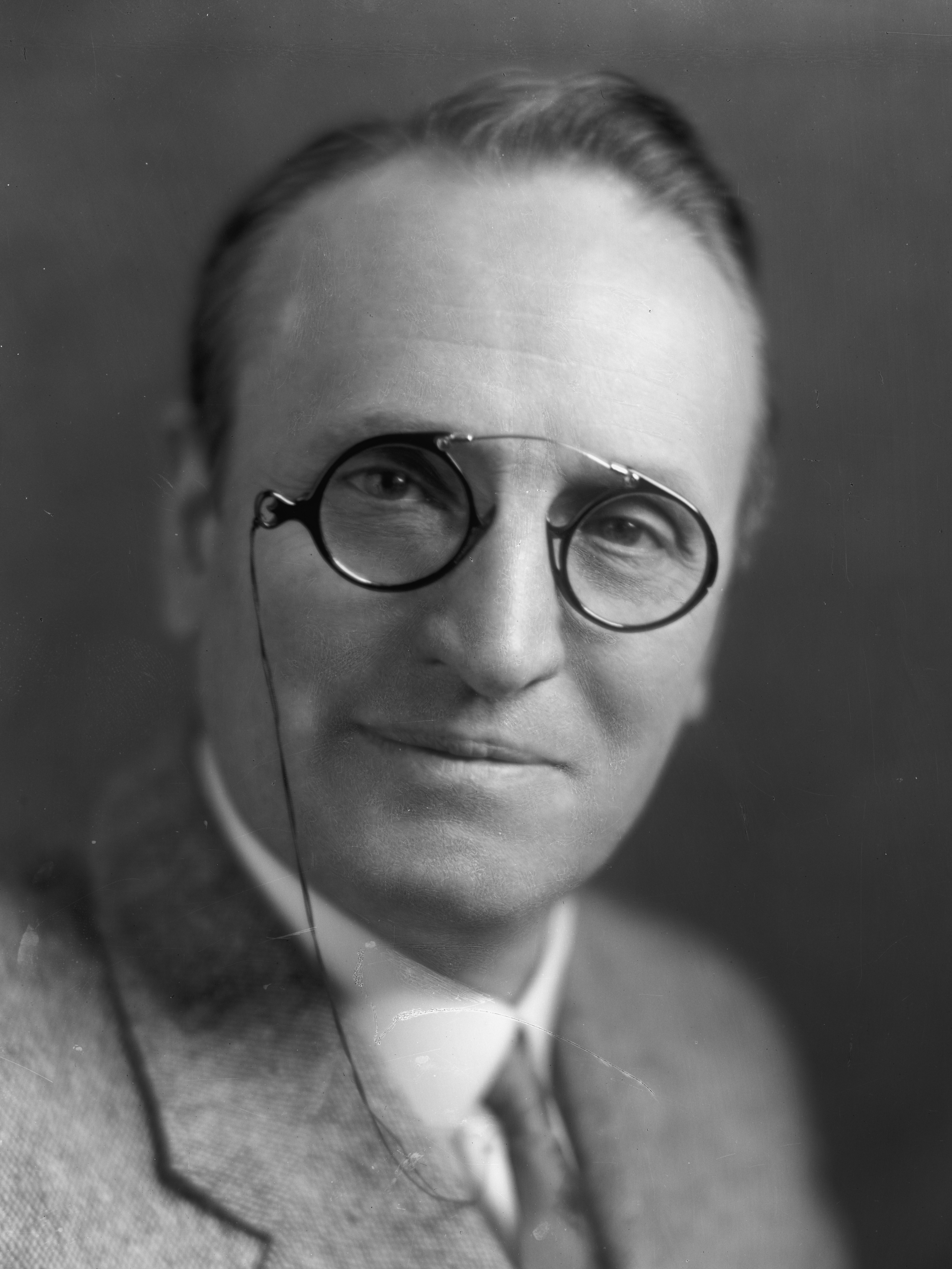

United States Senator from Arizona
- In office March 27, 1912 – January 3, 1941
- Preceded by: Seat established
- Succeeded by: Ernest W. McFarland

Personal details
- Born: Henry Fountain Ashurst; September 13, 1874 Winnemucca, Nevada, U.S.
- Died: May 31, 1962 (aged 87) Washington, D.C., U.S.
- Party: Democratic
- Spouse: Elizabeth McEvoy Reno
- Education: Stockton Business College; University of Michigan Law School

Henry Fountain Ashurst (September 13, 1874 – May 31, 1962) was an American Democratic politician and one of the first two senators from Arizona. Largely self-educated, he served as a district attorney and member of the Arizona Territorial legislature before fulfilling his childhood ambition of joining the United States Senate. During his time in the Senate, Ashurst was chairman of the Committee on Indian Affairs and the Judiciary Committee.

Called "the longest U.S. theatrical engagement on record" by Time, Ashurst's political career was noted for a self-contradictory voting record, for the use of a sesquipedalian vocabulary, and for a love of public speaking that earned him a reputation as one of the Senate's greatest orators. Among the sobriquets assigned to him were "the Dean of Inconsistency", "Five-Syllable Henry", and the "Silver-Tongued Sunbeam of the Painted Desert".

== Background ==
Ashurst was born on September 13, 1874, in an uncovered wagon near Winnemucca, Humboldt County, Nevada, to William and Sarah Ashurst, the second of ten children. His family moved to a ranch near Williams, Arizona, when he was two, and he attended school in Flagstaff. At the age of ten he showed his ambition to be a senator by writing "Henry Fountain Ashurst, U.S. Senator from Arizona" into a speller. After dropping out of school at the age of thirteen, he worked as a cowboy on his father's ranch.

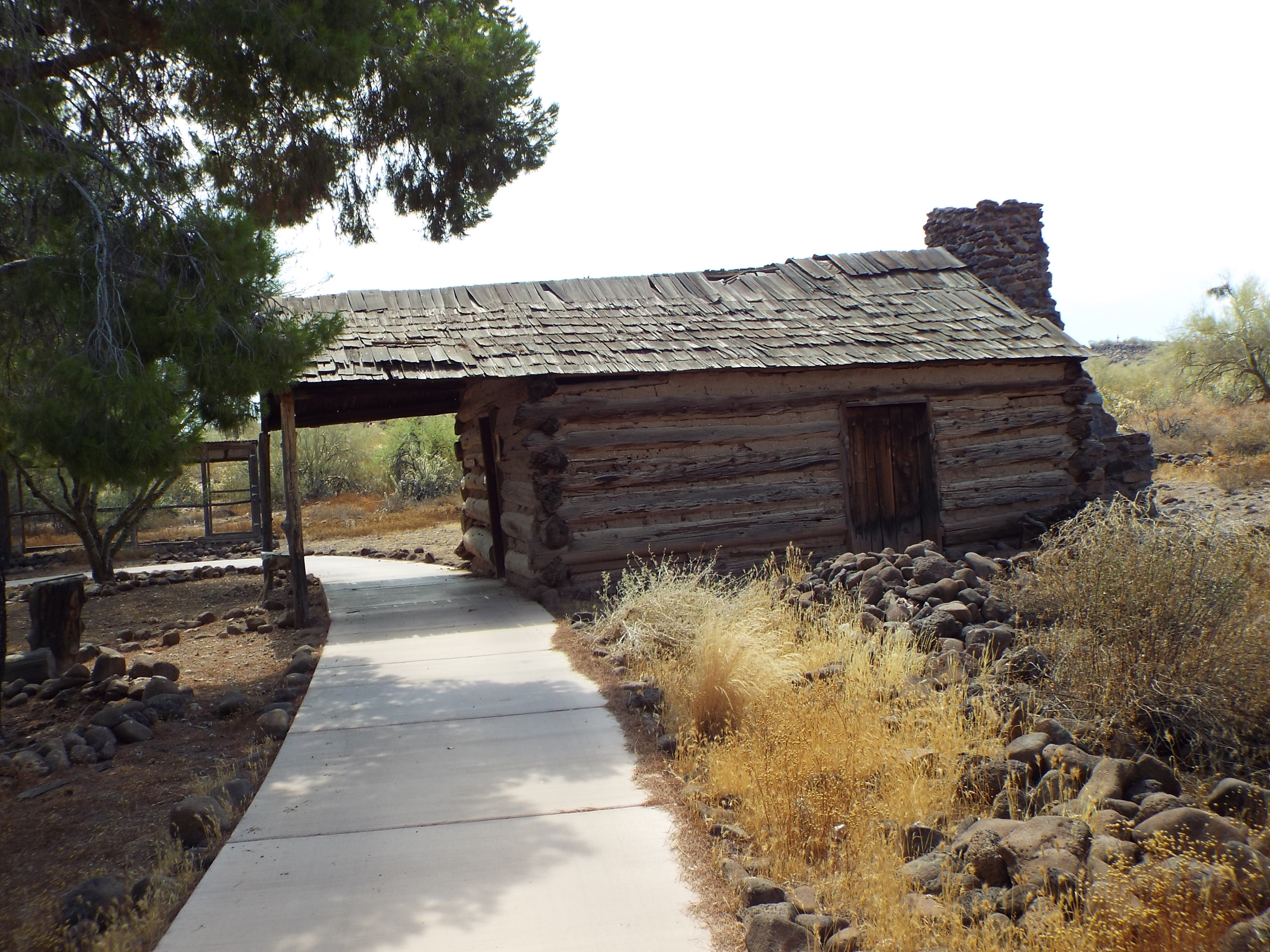
Senator Ashurst's boyhood home, now preserved at Pioneer Arizona in Phoenix

At the age of nineteen, Ashurst was made the turnkey at the county jail in Flagstaff. While working at the jail, he developed an interest in the law by reading Blackstone's Commentaries. He later worked at a local lumber yard and studied law at night. In 1895, he worked as a lumberjack in the Los Angeles area and as a hod carrier in San Francisco. Following a brief return to Flagstaff, Ashurst enrolled at Stockton Business College (now Humphreys College), and graduated in 1896. Ashurst was admitted to the bar in 1897 and began a law practice in Williams. He completed his formal education with a year at the University of Michigan Law School beginning in 1903.

In 1904, Ashurst married Elizabeth McEvoy Reno, an Irish-born widow with one child from her first marriage. She had moved to Flagstaff with her children to establish and manage a Weather Bureau station. She served as his political advisor for the rest of her life. Mrs. Ashurst died on November 1, 1939.

== Political career ==
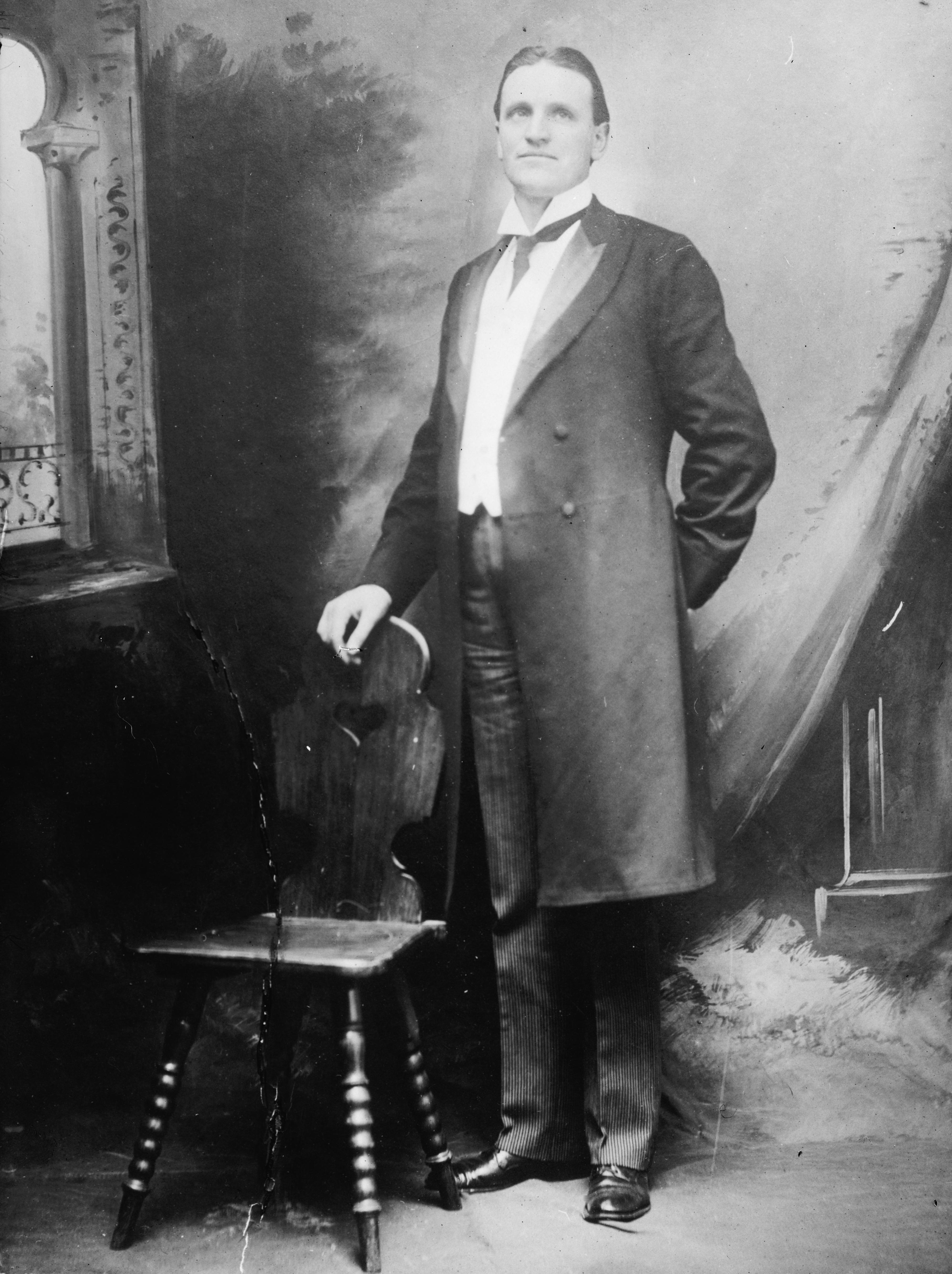
Ashurst in his typical frock coat, striped pants, and winged collar.

Ashurst was elected to the Territorial House of Representatives in 1897. He was re-elected in 1899, and became the territory's youngest speaker. In 1902, he was elected to the Territorial Senate. He served as district attorney of Coconino County from 1905 to 1908, when he moved to Prescott, Arizona.

In 1911, Ashurst presided over Arizona's constitutional convention. During the convention, he positioned himself for a U.S. Senate seat by avoiding the political fighting over various clauses in the constitution which damaged his rivals.

With the admission of Arizona as a state in 1912, Ashurst was elected by the Arizona legislature as one of the state's two senators, taking office on April 2 alongside Marcus A. Smith. He was easily re-elected in 1916 (by popular vote), and again in 1922, 1928, and 1934, serving for almost 29 years. He sought re-election in 1940 but was defeated in the Democratic primary.

During his early years in the Senate, Ashurst was a supporter of the Woodrow Wilson administration and served as chairman of the Committee on Indian Affairs between 1914 and 1919. The Democrats lost control of the Senate in 1918, and the presidency in 1920. Ashurst became a critic of Republican leaders and policy. The Democrats regained control in 1932, and Ashurst became chairman of the Judiciary Committee, serving until he left the Senate in 1941.

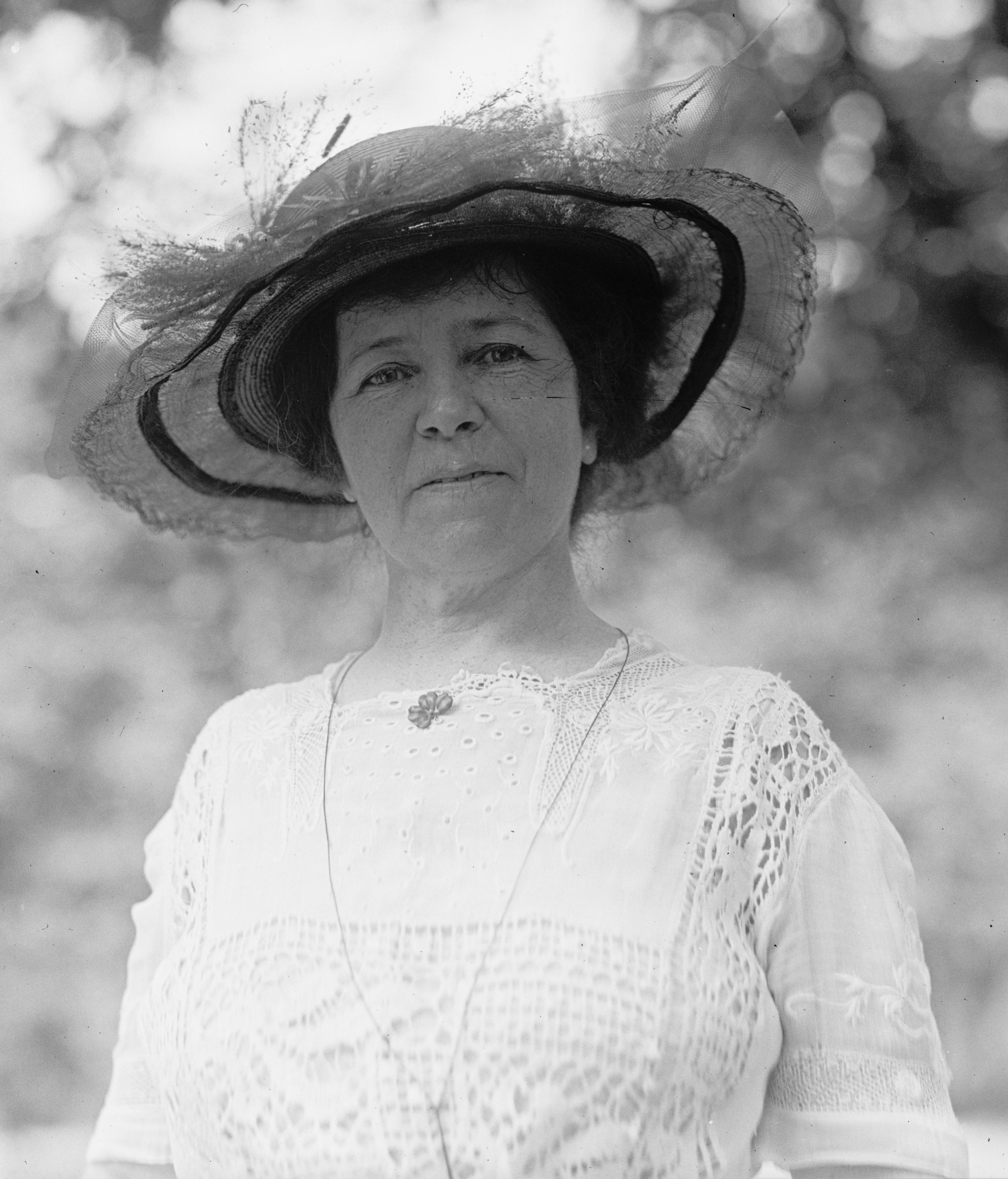
Elizabeth McEvoy Reno Ashurst, wife of Senator Ashurst

While in office, Ashurst focused on the interests of his constituents. He described this focus with the statement: "You (the people of Arizona) send me to Washington to represent you in the Senate. But you do not send me here because you are interested in grave questions of international policy. When I come back to Arizona, you never ask me questions about such policies; instead, you ask me, 'What about my pension?' or 'What about that job for my sons?'" While he routinely read correspondence from his home state, letters and telegrams from other states were normally ignored.

During re-election campaigns, Ashurst employed one of his favorite quotations, "Praise undeserved is scandal in disguise." To this end, his normal technique was to confess his faults and shortcomings to the voters while at the same time praising his opponent. During the 1934 elections he even told his constituents "If you don't send me back to the Senate, you'll have an old broken down politician on your hands, and you don't want that." Ashurst was popular with Arizona voters; only in the Republican landslide year of 1928 was his margin less than 10%, and in 1934 he won by 46%.

But after five terms in the Senate, Ashurst was unseated in the 1940 Democratic primary by Ernest McFarland. After his defeat, he gave a farewell address to the Senate. The Senate chamber was crowded with fellow senators and also many U.S. Representatives. Ashurst reflected on the experience of defeat. He said,

The first half-hour, you imagine that the earth has slipped from beneath your feet and that the stars above your head have paled and faded, and in your heart you wonder how the Senate will do without you, and how the country will get along without you. But, within another hour, there comes a peace and joy to be envied by the world's greatest philosopher.

=== Oratory and style ===
I suffer from Cacoëthes loquendi, a mania or itch for talking; from vanity, morbidity and, as is plain to everyone who knows me, from an inborn, an inveterate flair for histrionics.

— Henry F. Ashurst,

Ashurst had an affection for oration, as expressed by his statement, "I simply love speaking – just as one may like maple syrup, Beethoven, Verdi, or Longfellow, Kipling, or Shakespeare – one hardly knows why." This combined with his courtly manners and impeccable attire earned Ashurst a reputation as the Chesterfield of the Senate. The New York Times said "Sheer eloquence is best personified in the present Senate by Ashurst of Arizona – the debonair, balm-tongued chairman of the Senate Judiciary Committee. Without losing one whit of his eloquence, or missing or misquoting a classical phrase, Ashurst can run the range from buffoonery to some of the most challenging remarks heard in Congress."

Ashurst's loquacious nature developed at an early age. After obtaining copies of several speeches by Senator Roscoe Conkling, a prominent 19th-century orator, Ashurst developed his speaking range and ability by thundering the words of other to the plants and rocks of the surrounding countryside. He also read a wide variety of classical and literary sources in an effort to learn as much quotable material as possible. As a result of these early efforts, by the time Ashurst joined Congress he had a well-developed speaker's voice and a wide collection of memorized quotations in both English and Latin. To this was added an interest in etymology that aided his vast vocabulary.

I love auriferous words, and nothing delights me more than to pluck gems from the dictionary that otherwise might never see the light of day.

— Henry F. Ashurst,

Ashurst's most celebrated address came on June 15, 1935, when on the Senate floor he chastised Huey Long with a harangue which Time called "one of the most devastating speeches the chamber ever heard." Other notable speeches by Ashurst dealt with Hugo Black's nomination to the U.S. Supreme Court in 1937, a proposed tariff on imported copper in 1932, and U.S. entry into World War I in 1917.

Senator Barry Goldwater was so fond of Ashurst's speeches that he compiled fourteen into the book Speeches of Henry Fountain Ashurst of Arizona. Ashurst responded to the book with "But, Barry, I made over 5,000 of them."

=== "Dean of Inconsistency" ===
...there has never been superadded to these vices of mine the withering embalming vice of consistency. Whoever in the public service is handcuffed and shackled by the vice of consistency will be a man not free to act as various questions come before him from time to time; he will be a statesman locked in a prison house the keys to which are in the keeping of days and events that are dead. As Emerson said, 'A foolish consistency is the hobgoblin of little minds, adored by little statesmen.' Never have I let what I said yesterday bind me today. No Senator can change his mind quicker than I.

— Henry F. Ashurst,

Through his legislative career, Ashurst maintained a need to be inconsistent in his political actions. He was also noted for an eccentric and flexible record on a variety of issues. Ashurst's pride in his variable record was such that he appointed himself "Dean of Inconsistency" and awarded Degrees of Inconsistency to other senators who displayed irregular voting patterns. For his critics, he usually kept a supply of tracts on his person explaining the virtue and necessity of being inconsistent and awarded these to his detractors when he was criticized for his incongruous nature.

An example of Ashurst's inconsistency is his behavior regarding the Judiciary Reorganization Bill of 1937. During the 1936 presidential election Ashurst denounced rumors that Franklin D. Roosevelt planned to reorganize the Supreme Court by "whittling, chiseling, indirection, circumlocution, periphrasis, and house-that-Jack-built tactics." He furthermore labeled the rumored plan to pack the court with six new justices "a prelude to tyranny". Upon Roosevelt's introduction of the plan, Ashurst became the legislation's sponsor and asserted "I'm for it, it's a step in the right direction. It will be enacted into law immediately." After the bill's introduction, Ashurst then delayed hearings in the Judiciary Committee, saying "No haste, no hurry, no waste, no worry – that is the motto of this committee." As a result of his delaying efforts, the bill was held in committee for 165 days, and opponents of the bill credited Ashurst as instrumental in its defeat. Upon receiving a constituent's congratulatory message for his stand on the bill, Ashurst replied "Dear Madame: Which stand?"

Other examples of Ashurst switching positions include:

- Advocacy of Prohibition, followed by a vote to allow 3.2% beer.
- Voting both for and against the Eighteenth Amendment (Prohibition).
- His four votes on veteran's bonuses, two for and two against, which generated the comment "What of it? At least I was fifty per cent right, which is a pretty good record for a politician."

Even his speaking skills could contribute to his inconsistency, as was the case on January 21, 1914. Ashurst gave a three-hour speech in support of the Nineteenth Amendment (for women's suffrage), which exhausted the time available to vote on it, and delayed its passage.

== Retirement and death ==
During his farewell speech in the Senate, Ashurst indicated his intention to retire to Arizona, saying, "When you are here worrying about patronage, worrying about committee assignments, worrying about bills, I shall possibly be enjoying the ecstasy of the starry stillness of an Arizona desert night, or enjoying the scarlet glory of her blossoming cactus, and possibly I may be wandering through the Petrified Forest in Arizona." But instead of going home, he accepted a position on the U.S. Board of Immigration Appeals, serving from April 8, 1941, until his retirement on February 28, 1943.

After his retirement, Ashurst lived in Washington, D.C., devoting his time to classical poetry and public speaking. He also made several public appearances. Ashurst was a contestant on the television game show The $64,000 Question; he missed a question, but received a Cadillac car as a consolation prize. He also made a cameo appearance in the film Advise & Consent, in the role of "Senator McCafferty". Ashurst suffered a stroke on May 15, 1962, and was admitted to Georgetown University Hospital where he died on May 31, 1962.

Ashurst kept a journal from June 1910 to July 27, 1937, which contains pen portraits of several fellow senators. The journal was edited by George F. Sparks and published in 1962 under the title A Many Colored Toga.

== See also ==
- List of United States senators from Arizona

U.S. Senate
Preceded by (none)	U.S. senator (Class 1) from Arizona; 1912–1941; Served alongside: Marcus A. Smith, Ralph H. Cameron, Carl Hayden	Succeeded by Ernest W. McFarland
Party political offices
Preceded by (none)	Democratic nominee for U.S. Senator from Arizona (Class 1); 1912, 1916, 1922, 1928, 1934	Succeeded by Ernest McFarland
Political offices
Preceded by William J. Stone	Chairman of the Senate Indian Affairs Committee; 1914–1919	Succeeded by Charles Curtis
Preceded by George W. Norris	Chairman of the Senate Judiciary Committee; 1933–1941	Succeeded by Frederick Van Nuys
Honorary titles
Preceded by Norris Brown	Most senior living U.S. senator (Sitting or former); January 5, 1960 – May 31, 1962	Succeeded by John Heiskell
