= 1958 United States Senate election in Arizona =

- November 4, 1958
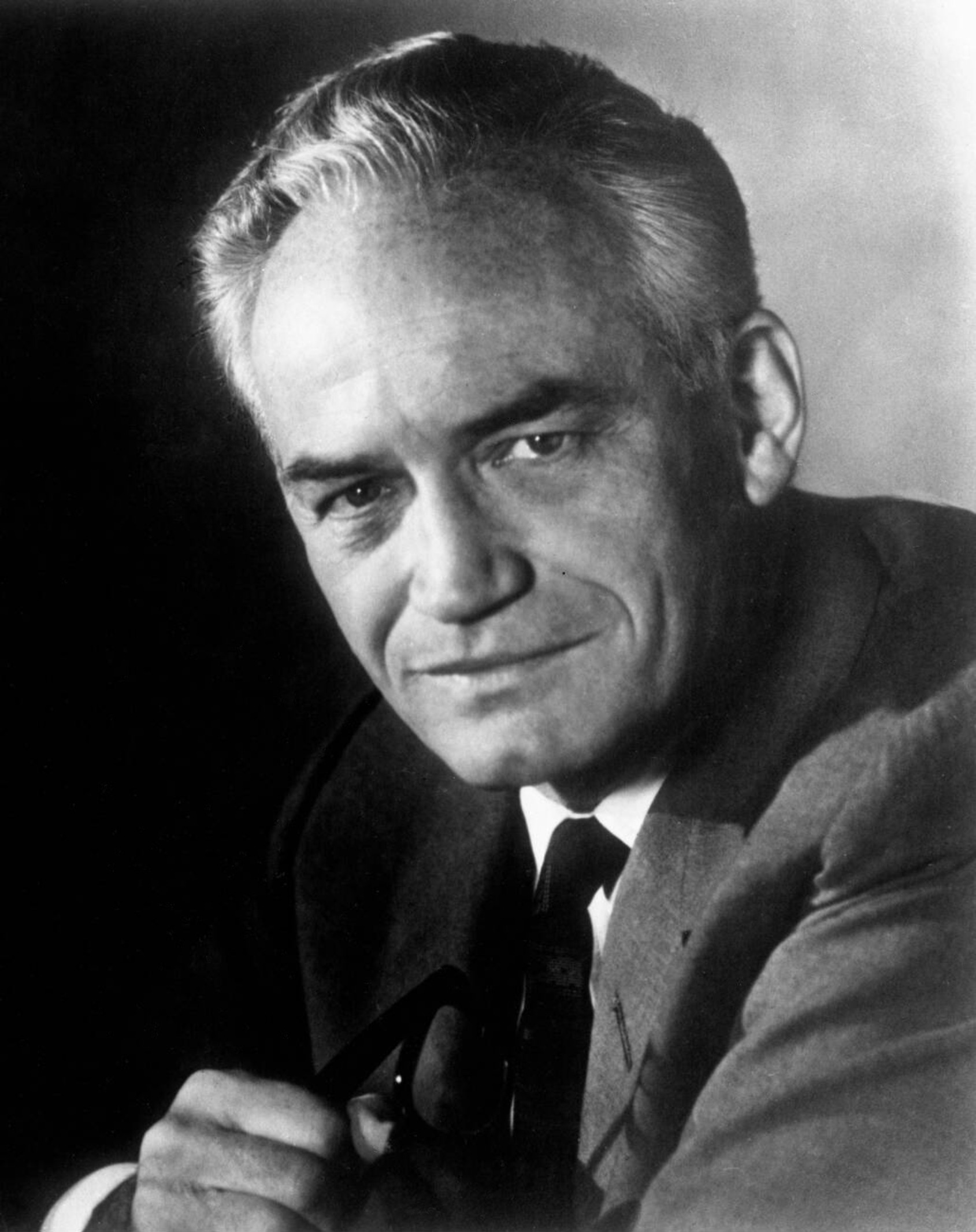

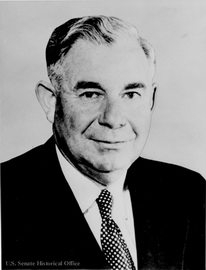
Nominee	Barry Goldwater	Ernest McFarland
Party	Republican	Democratic
Popular vote	164,593	129,030
Percentage	56.06%	43.94%
- County results Goldwater: 50–60% 60–70% McFarland: 50–60% 60–70%
U.S. senator before election
Barry Goldwater
Republican
Elected U.S. Senator
Barry Goldwater
Republican

The 1958 United States Senate election in Arizona took place on November 4, 1958. Incumbent Republican U.S. Senator Barry Goldwater ran for reelection to a second term, and defeated former U.S. Senator, and then-Governor, Ernest McFarland in the general election. The election was a rematch from 1952, where Goldwater defeated McFarland by a narrow margin. Goldwater had attributed the 1952 win to the unpopularity of President Harry S. Truman and popular Wisconsin Senator Joseph McCarthy endorsing his campaign.

This would be McFarland's final run for statewide office. He became an associate justice of the Arizona Supreme Court in 1965 and Chief Justice in 1968 before retiring from public service. This election was the first time ever that an incumbent Republican Senator from Arizona was re-elected or won re-election.

== Republican primary ==
=== Candidates ===
- Barry Goldwater, incumbent U.S. Senator

== Democratic primary ==
=== Candidates ===
- Ernest McFarland, Governor of Arizona, former U.S. Senator
- Stephen W. Langmade

=== Results ===
Democratic primary results
Party	Candidate	Votes	%
Democratic	Ernest McFarland	111,429	72.5%
Democratic	Stephen W. Langmade	42,199	27.5%
Total votes		153,628	100.0

== General election ==
United States Senate election in Arizona, 1958
Party	Candidate	Votes	%	±%
Republican	Barry Goldwater (incumbent)	164,593	56.06%	+4.75%
Democratic	Ernest McFarland	129,030	43.94%	−4.76%
Majority		35,563	12.11%	+9.50%
Turnout		293,623		
Republican hold		Swing		

== See also ==
- United States Senate elections, 1958
