= James H. McClintock =

American historian and Rough Rider (1844–1934)

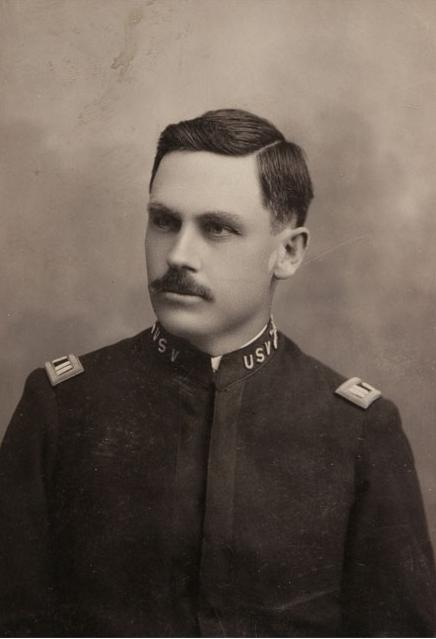
- Captain James H. McClintock 1898
- Born: February 23, 1864; Sacramento, California
- Died: May 10, 1934 (aged 70); Los Angeles, California
- Burial place: Los Angeles National Cemetery
- Military career
- Allegiance: United States
- Branch: United States Army
- Service years: 1898–1921
- Rank: Colonel
- Commands: 1st United States Volunteer Cavalry; Arizona National Guard
- Conflicts: Spanish–American War
- Awards: Army Distinguished Service Medal
- Other work: Adjutant General of the Arizona Territory

James Harvey McClintock (February 23, 1864 – May 10, 1934) was an American teacher, journalist, volunteer cavalry officer in Roosevelt's Rough Riders, civil servant, radio broadcaster, author and historian.

== Early life and education ==
Colonel James Harvey McClintock was born in Sacramento, California, February 23, 1864, and is a son of John and Sarah G. (Brittingham) McClintock, of Illinois and Maryland, respectively. The father was a pioneer of California, where, in Sacramento he became a grain shipper and where for many years he was city auditor. James H. McClintock acquired an academic education in his native state, in San Francisco and Berkeley, and later graduated from the Normal School of Arizona at Tempe. In early manhood he engaged in teaching for several terms.

== Arizona Territory ==
He arrived in Arizona in June, 1879, on one of the first passenger trains into Maricopa. He located in Phoenix, having come to the territory to join his brother, Charles E. McClintock, then engaged in the publication of the Phoenix Herald and soon thereafter took part in the first republican organization known in Phoenix. Since that time he was since been connected with many papers published in the state, in Phoenix, Prescott, Globe, Tempe and Tucson. While residing in Tempe, when but twenty two years of age, he was made justice of the peace and at the same time was engaged in the publication of a paper and in the operation of a farm. For years he was a member of the board of directors of the normal schools of Arizona.

McClintock was an employee in the adjutant general's office at Whipple Barracks in 1886–87 at the time of the Geronimo campaign. For a long period he was the Arizona member of the National Irrigation Congress executive committee, also acting as secretary for the congress.

== Spanish–American War ==
In April, 1898, while conducting a news bureau at Phoenix, he assisted Colonel Alexander O. Brodie and Captain William O. O'Neill in enrolling a cavalry regiment for the Spanish–American War. Only two troops, two hundred and fifteen men, were accepted. Along with former Assistant Secretary of the US Navy, Theodore Roosevelt, Colonel Brodie had become one of the squadron/battalion commanders of the regiment and was promoted to major, with McClintock as "B" Troop commander and O'Neill as "A" Troop commander, these two men were appointed captains in the First United States Volunteer Cavalry, otherwise known as Roosevelt's Rough Riders. Captain McClintock would later be given the brevet of major, for gallantry in action. He was seriously wounded on June 24, 1898, at Guasimas, Cuba, with three machine gun bullets striking him in the leg. B Troop 1st Lieutenant, George B. Wilcox assumed command of the troop and McClintock was evacuated down to the beach at Siboney, and sent back to the United States and transported up to the hospital at Fort Wadsworth on Staten Island. Because of his serious wounds, he did not take part in the more famous Battle of San Juan Hill on July 1, 1898. It would not be until Thanksgiving Day that he was discharged from the hospital at Fort Wadsworth. He was carried on the rolls of the Rough Riders until their disbandment.

== Post-war experience ==
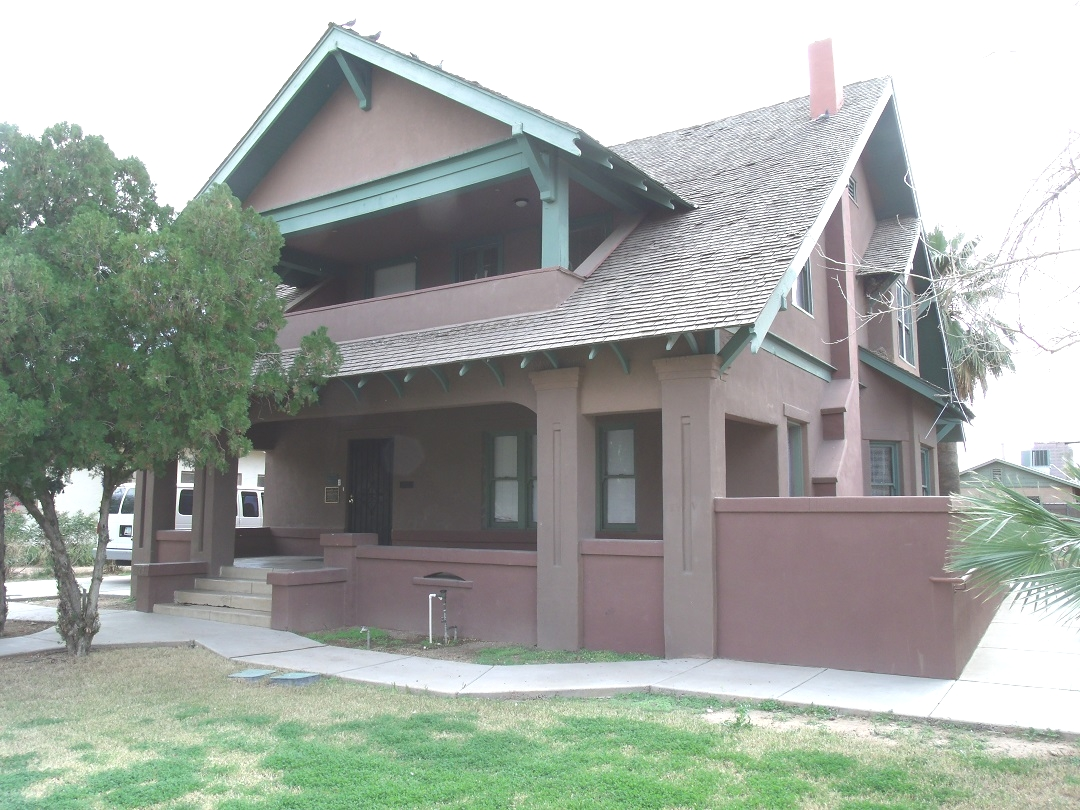
Colonel James McClintock's house was built in 1911 and is located at 323 E. Willetta St. in Phoenix Az.

McClintock's discharge from the Rough Riders did not close out his military record, for in June, 1902, he was elected colonel of the First Arizona Infantry. Soon after he commanded the regiment in the most trying labor trouble ever known in the Southwest in a riot of thirty-five hundred miners at Morenci. He handled the situation with firmness, fully protecting the property involved and was gratified that his task was accompanied by no bloodshed. For eight years he was at the head of the regiment and for much of the time acted as adjutant general of Arizona. He served as president of the Rough Riders Association and is its historian. He was also the first commander of the' Spanish War Veterans for the Department of Arizona. The first field service that the National Guard of Arizona ever participated in was under the direction of Colonel McClintock in camps in Arizona and California. He is an acknowledged expert in military sanitation and camp arrangement and discipline.

== Government service ==
In April, 1902, Colonel McClintock was appointed postmaster of Phoenix and for twelve years filled the position under three presidential appointments. When he became incumbent the income of the office was $28,000 annually. When he surrendered office to a democrat, October 1, 1914, the income had increased to $120,000, showing something of the growth of the city. He had installed six rural routes and had been largely responsible in securing for Phoenix the new federal building, erected at a cost of $170,000.

== Newspaper and archaeological work ==
Colonel McClintock was also active along other lines. For eighteen years he was the editorial representative in Arizona of the Los Angeles Times and did much magazine writing and special literary work. He took keenest interest in archaeological research, and served as president of the Arizona Folklore Association. In the fall of 1889, he was a member of an expedition sent out by Maricopa county to discover reservoir sites in the mountains of Arizona, the other members being County Surveyor Billy Breakenridge and John R. Norton. They discovered and were the first to plat the site of the Roosevelt dam. Colonel McClintock also for years was a director of the Phoenix Board of Trade and in 1910–11 was its president.

== Marriage ==
In June 1900, the marriage of Colonel McClintock and Dorothy G. Bacon of Palo Alto, California, a graduate of Stanford University was celebrated. She specialized in botany in college work and did much work in the classification of the flora of the Southwest. Mrs. McClintock was one of the founders of the Woman's Club of Phoenix and also of the Arizona Federation of Women's Clubs.

== Return to California and death ==
McClintock continued to live in Arizona until his poor health forced him to return to Los Angeles, California, where he died on May 10, 1934, at the age of 70. He is buried in the Los Angeles National Cemetery.

== Legacy ==
Established in 1964, McClintock High School in Tempe bears his name. McClintock Hall at Arizona State University is also named for him. Additionally, McClintock Road in Tempe, bears his name.

== Works ==
- History of Arizona, 1916
- Mormon Settlement in Arizona, 1921
