= Ralph H. Cameron =

Republican U.S. Senator from Arizona

Ralph Henry Cameron
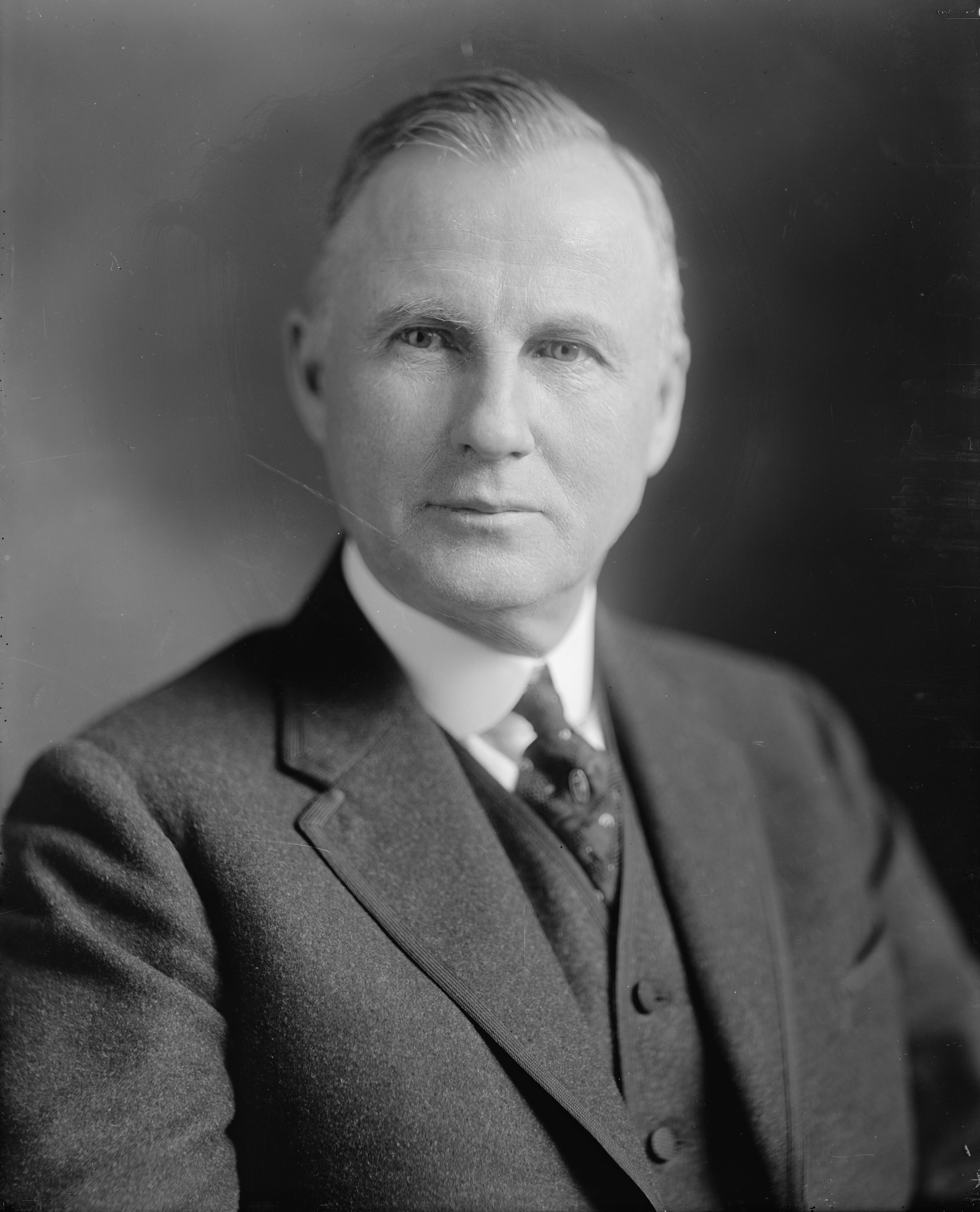

United States Senator from Arizona
- In office March 4, 1921 – March 3, 1927
- Preceded by: Marcus A. Smith
- Succeeded by: Carl Hayden

Delegate to the U.S. House of Representatives from Arizona Territory
- In office March 4, 1909 – February 14, 1912
- Preceded by: Marcus A. Smith
- Succeeded by: Carl Hayden (as U.S. Representative)

Personal details
- Born: October 21, 1863 Southport, Maine, U.S.
- Died: February 12, 1953 (aged 89) Washington, D.C., U.S.
- Party: Republican
- Spouses: Ida May Spaulding (m. 1895–1933) Elizabeth Reese (m. 1935)

Ralph Henry Cameron (October 21, 1863 – February 12, 1953) was an American businessman, prospector and politician who served as both Arizona Territory's delegate to Congress and as a United States senator for Arizona. As a territorial delegate, he saw Arizona achieve statehood in 1912. Cameron's greatest achievement in the US Senate was the authorization for the Coolidge Dam.

On the business front, Cameron was active early in efforts to develop the Grand Canyon in what is now viewed as a classic example of rent-seeking. Toward this end, he often used his political influence to help his business interests. Popular among residents of northern Arizona for much of his political career, his fortunes changed after he reached the U.S. Senate and voters began to view his actions as self-serving.

== Background ==
Cameron was born on October 21, 1863, to Henry and Abigail Ann (Jones) Cameron in Southport, Maine. He attended public schools until the age of thirteen when he left home for the fishing fleet working the Grand Banks of Newfoundland. Cameron would later claim that much of his knowledge came from the "School of Hard Knocks". After five years employment as a fisherman, Cameron moved to Boston where he became a store clerk.

After reading John Wesley Powell's account of his 1869 exploration of the Colorado River, Cameron wanted to learn more about the American Southwest. This prompted him to quit his job and take a train to Flagstaff, Arizona Territory in 1883. He initially worked at a sawmill but shortly thereafter joined his brother, Niles, in operating a mercantile store. Two months after his arrival, Cameron visited the Grand Canyon. He explored the area for nine days on his first visit and returned a year later with Edward E. Ayer to investigate lumbering opportunities along the South Rim. The brothers eventually sold their store and focused on mining in the Grand Canyon.

In 1890, Cameron assisted Peter Berry and his brother Niles in prospecting around the Grand Canyon. The trio established the Last Chance Mine. To improve access to the mine, Berry constructed a trail and a log cabin hotel in 1892 and 1893.

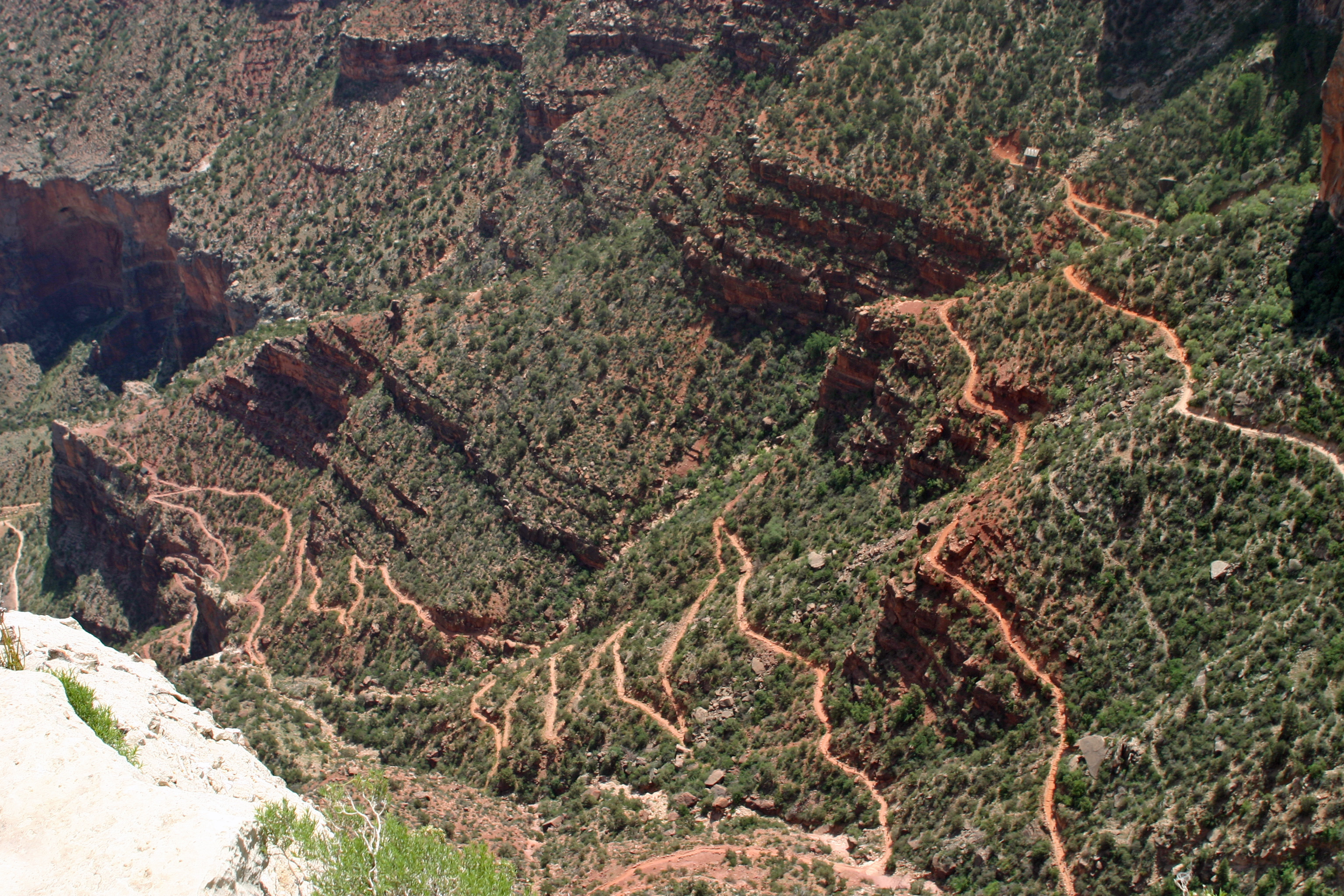
Bright Angel trail

Recognizing the Grand Canyon's potential for tourism, Cameron and his brother built a hotel at the head of the Bright Angel Trail and began charging a toll for use of the trail. The trail, which probably began as a game trail, had been improved by Berry, Niel Cameron, and others (the level of Ralph Cameron's involvement is unclear). Berry filed paperwork to establish it as a private toll road in February 1891. The trail saw little traffic and fell into disrepair by 1897. In either 1901 or 1902, Cameron obtained Berry's rights to the trail. Cameron received a five-year extension to the original ten year right to collect tolls, extending his franchise on the trail til 1906. He also began filing strategically placed mining claims, owning 39 such claims by 1907. Among the claims were the Wizard, which was located at the point where the trail reached the Colorado River, the Alder and Willow mill sites which controlled Indian Garden along with a nearby spring, the Magician claim which contained the trail's most demanding section, the Devil's Corkscrew, and Gold Eagle and Cape Horn claims at the top of the South Rim and containing Cameron's hotel along with the trail head.

The Grand Canyon Railway was completed in 1901. The railroad had an arrangement with a competing hotel which prevented Cameron from soliciting visitors at the railroad station, a practice that limited customers to his hotel. At the same time, Cameron angered a number of people by charging for use of the Bright Angel Trail. Tensions increased to the point where employees of both hotels began wearing firearms. Cameron closed his hotel after the El Tovar Hotel was opened.

== Coconino County ==
In 1889, Cameron became a leader in the efforts to create Coconino County from northern Yavapai County after becoming upset about having to travel to Prescott for jury duty and only receiving $2/day for the time and effort. When the new county was formed in 1891, Governor John N. Irwin appointed Cameron as the county's first sheriff. He served in the position for three terms, winning reelection in 1894 and 1896. He was a McKinley delegate during the 1896 Republican National Convention. Cameron married Ida May Spaulding in Flagstaff on November 25, 1895. The couple had two children: Ralph Jr. and Catherine.

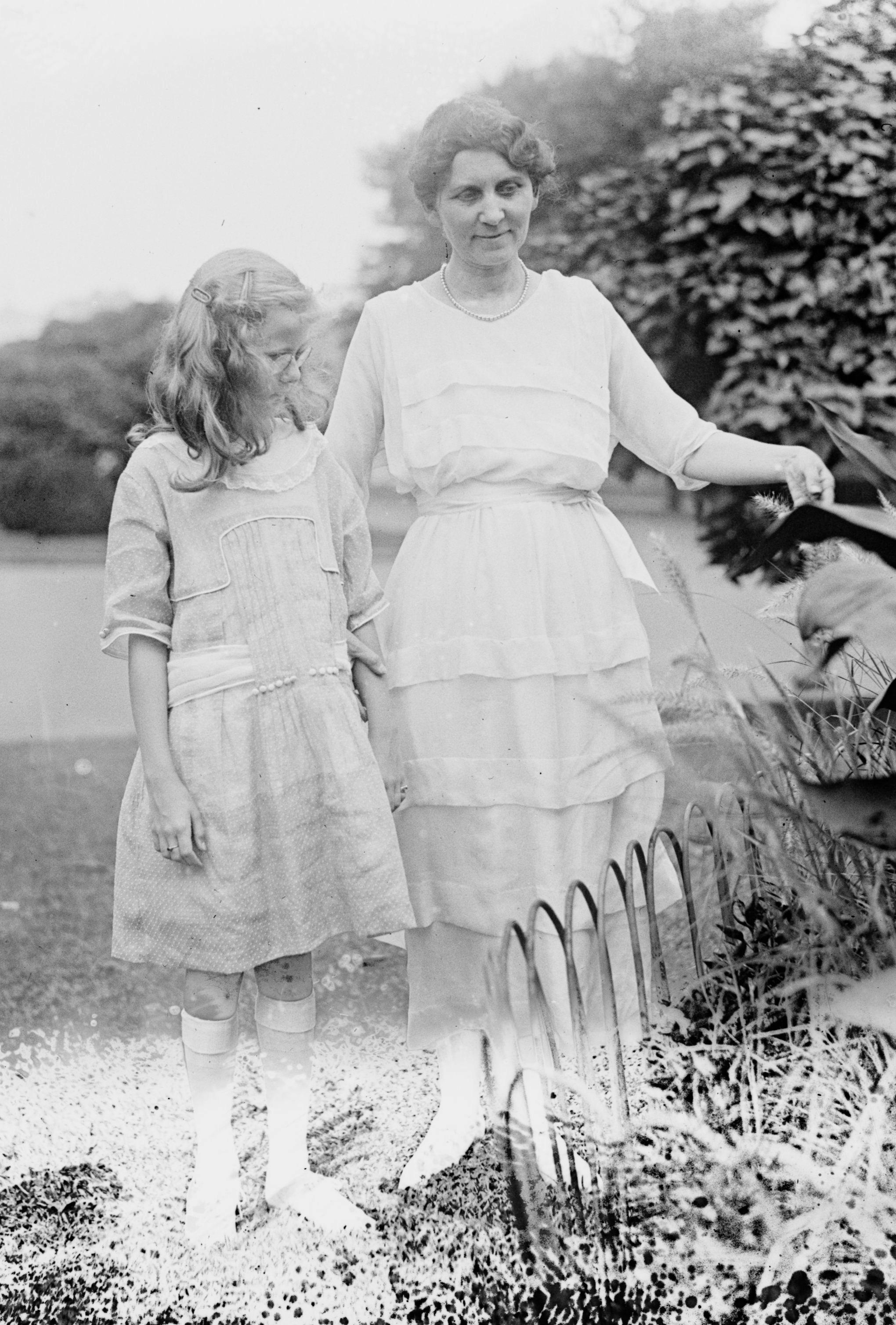
Ida May Spaulding Cameron with daughter Catherine (c. 1921)

When Cameron attempted to obtain patents for several of his mining claims, the Santa Fe Railroad contested the claims and sued to block the patents on the basis the claims did not have any valuable minerals. The Gold Eagle and Cape Horn also partially overlapped the railroad station grounds. As the 1898 Congressional grant authorizing the railroad station predated Cameron's 1902 claim application, the railroad maintained control of its grounds and right of way but in 1906, Judge Richard E. Sloan found sufficient evidence of mineral deposits for Cameron to keep his mining claim after adjusting its boundaries.

As the 1906 expiration of his franchise on the Bright Angel trail approached, Cameron began looking for new ways to extend his control of the trail. He was elected to the Coconino County Board of supervisors in 1904. A year later he became the board's chairman. When the 24th Arizona Territorial Legislature convened, he lobbied the session to pass the "Cameron bill" which required counties to give preference to the prior owner of a toll road when awarding the operating contract after a franchise on a road expired. Interior Secretary Ethan A. Hitchcock sent a telegram protesting the bill, prompting Governor Joseph H. Kibbey to veto the legislation. The legislature overrode the veto and passed the bill on March 18, 1907. When Cameron's franchise expired, the Santa Fe railroad offered to pay 70% of all collected tolls to the county in exchange for the contract to operate the Bright Angel trail. The county board rejected the railroad's offer and awarded a five-year contract to Cameron in 1907.

The Santa Fe railroad appealed the decision on Cameron's mining claims to United States General Land Office Commissioner Richard A. Ballinger. Following a common pattern where local land office officials who had ruled in Cameron's favor were overruled by their Washington superiors, Ballinger rejected Cameron's patent applications. Cameron then appealed to Interior Secretary James R. Garfield. Garfield initially found some pertinent information had not been included in the initial investigation and in August 1907 ordered a new investigation into Cameron's claims. Garfield issued a decision in February 1909 which found the disputed claims did not "possess such mineral character and values as to justify the land department in awarding the desired patent".

== Territorial Delegate ==
During the election of 1908, there was a widespread feeling throughout the territory that a Republican could have better results achieving statehood in a Republican controlled Congress than had been achieved by Arizona Territory's Democratic delegate, Mark Smith. Smith had accumulated a number of political enemies during his many years in office and spent time campaigning for William Jennings Bryan instead of working for his own re-election. Cameron received his party's nomination for the position on August 22. During the general election, he defeated Smith by a vote of 12,435 to 11,727 with all other candidates receiving 2,205 votes combined.

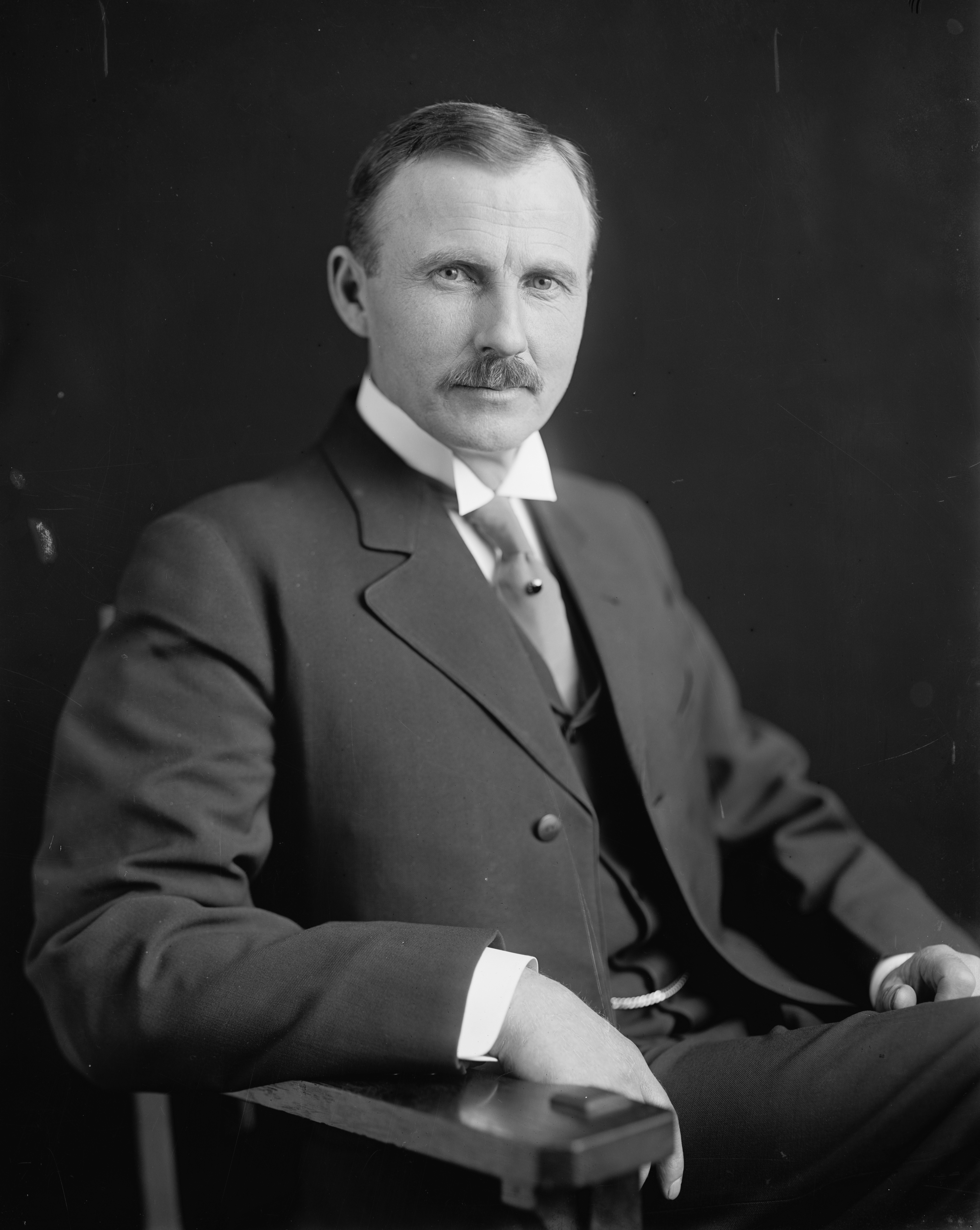
Territorial Delegate Ralph Cameron

Cameron took office on March 4, 1909. He was assigned to the House committees on Territories, Post Office and Post Roads, Mines and Mining, and Indian Affairs. Cameron submitted several bills during his first session, including a statehood bill, but did not speak from the House floor until the second session. When his statehood bill came up for debate before the House, Arizona's delegate argued, "It is a matter of history that Arizona has been knocking at the doors of Congress for many, many years, and its just claims to recognition and inclusion in the Sisterhood of States have met with scant consideration, notwithstanding the numerous promises and pledges of the two dominant parties." Cameron went on to point out that Arizona contained 37,000 qualified voters who were being denied the opportunity to have a say in the election of Presidents and other national leaders. The House passed the Arizona statehood bill on January 17 with President Taft signing the enabling act on June 20, 1910. Instead of facing reelection in 1910, Cameron's term was extended by presidential proclamation as part of process granting Arizona statehood.

As early as 1898 there was talk of the Grand Canyon becoming a national park. Most residents of northern Arizona Territory believed that mining was vital to the economic development of the area and opposed any efforts to give the canyon park status. Cameron felt that Washington tended to favor big business over the interests of local government and individuals. Despite the local opposition, President Roosevelt established Grand Canyon National Monument on January 22, 1908. In 1908 Cameron proposed creation of the Grand Canyon Scenic Railroad Company to build a scenic rail line along the south rim of the canyon and submitted a bill to gain Congressional approval for a right of way the next year. The Agriculture and Interior departments opposed the territorial delegate's plan but granted a permit to a Santa Fe railroad subsidiary authorizing construction of a road to the Grand Canyon the next year. The permit included a clause authorizing the subsidiary to "maintain as a free public highway the trail known as the Bright Angel Trail." Agriculture Secretary James Wilson blocked the Forest Service from action related to the Bright Angel, citing a 1909 decision by the Arizona Territorial Supreme Court which found the trail had been established prior to Grand Canyon National Forest and its rights had been "fixed permanently". Wilson did authorize construction of the road and it was completed in 1914.

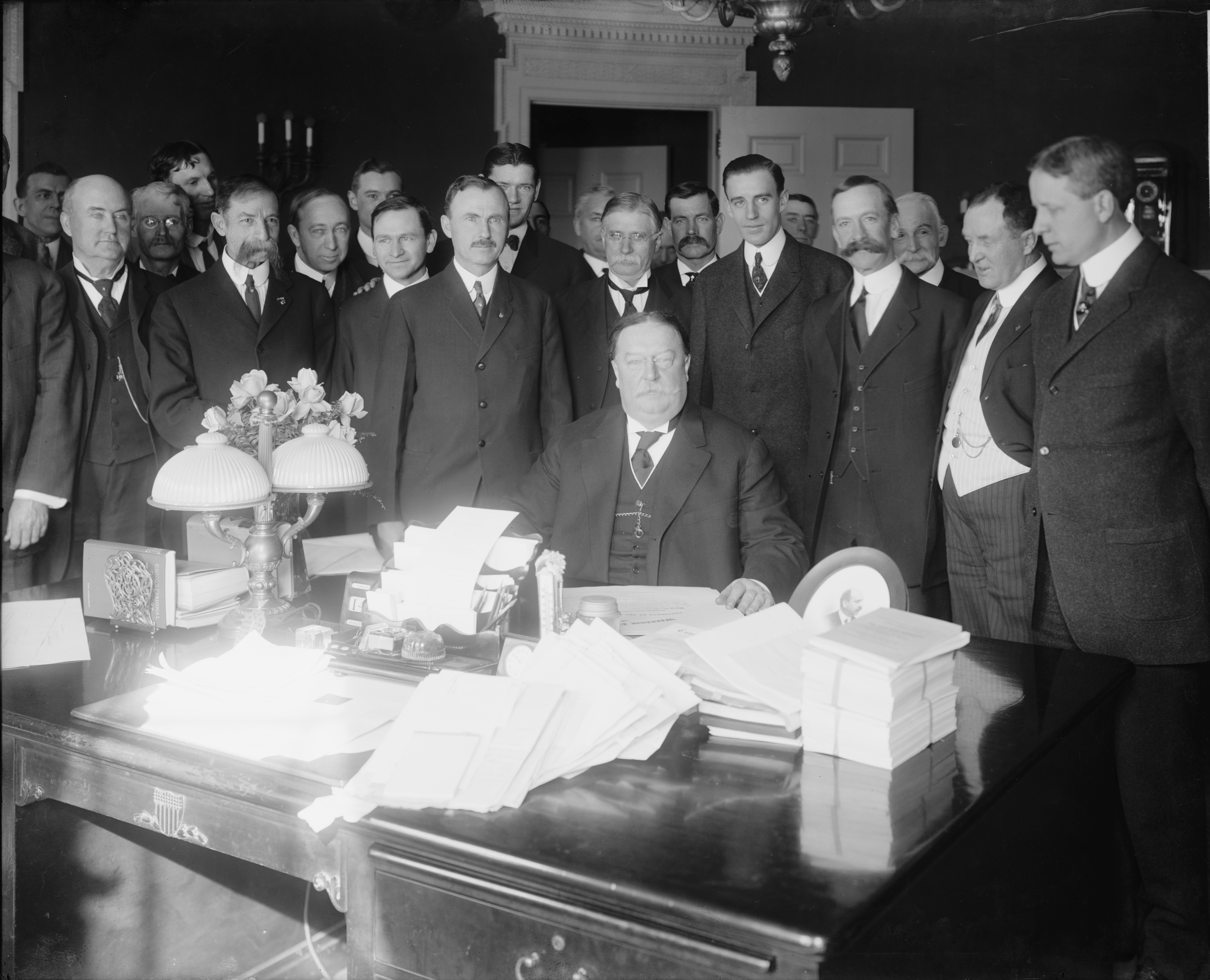
Signing of Arizona Statehood Bill. Territorial Delegate Cameron standing to left of President Taft

As early as 1907, potential investors looked to partner with Cameron to develop the Grand Canyon. Warner, Tucker & Company of Boston purchased options for Cameron's mining claims when it looked into building a hydroelectric dam in the canyon. Other investors with plans for other dams, funiculars, mining projects, and a pipeline to pump water from Indian Gardens to the South Rim followed but nothing ever came of these proposals as Cameron was unable to establish clear title on his claims. The adverse decision by the Interior Department did not halt Cameron in his efforts to find investors as he continued to claim his mining claims were valid.

Arizona's constitutional convention met from October 10 till December 9, 1910, and was composed of 11 Republicans and 41 Democrats. The resulting document contained a number of Progressive Era reforms including provisions for recall, referendum, and initiative. Cameron was not a supporter of the proposed constitution. He joined with Governor Richard E. Sloan in claiming the proposed constitution would cause a postponement of Arizona statehood. Final Congressional approval for Arizona statehood occurred on August 10, 1911. President Taft vetoed the statehood bill, citing his opposition to the recall of judges. The same day as the veto, a bill was introduced in Congress to admit Arizona provided the proposed constitution had the provision allowing recall of judges removed. The new bill was signed by President Taft on August 21, 1911. Arizona voters approved the required change and Arizona became a state on February 14, 1912.

== Out of office ==
During the 1911 run up to statehood, Cameron was a Republican nominee for United States Senate but lost in general election. After leaving office he turned his focus to his business career and became president of the Arizona Securities and Investment Company. An exception to this came in 1914 when Cameron was the Republican nominee to replace George W. P. Hunt as Governor of Arizona. After being defeated in this race, Cameron decided to sit back and wait for a good opportunity before making another run for office.

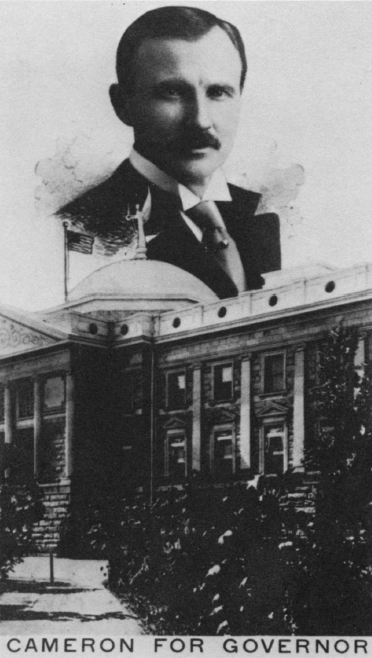
1914 campaign handbill

In addition to his political efforts, Cameron was busy with development plans for the Grand Canyon. On May 24, 1912, a plan involving a Philadelphia investment group was announced. If completed the deal would have paid Cameron over $5 million (equivalent to $167 million in 2025). The next month, the Santa Fe Land Improvement Company paid $40,000 for right of ways across Cameron's Cape Horn claim at the top of the South Rim along with other claims along the Bright Angel and Hermit trails. Included in the deal were water rights to the springs at Indian Gardens. Most details of the deal were kept secret to protect the railroad from potential opportunists.

While Cameron was working on his business deals, the Forest Service was having difficulties administering the Grand Canyon National Monument. Part of the Forest Services problems was Cameron and other northern Arizona residents were able to block development plans for the canyon through their mining claims. Dealing with the claims was complicated by the fact the national monument was administered by the Department of Agriculture while the mining claims were administered by the Interior Department. Creation of a national park would simplify things by combining administration into just the Interior department. Toward this end, Chief Forester Henry S. Graves began lobbying the U.S. Congress to create a national park at the Grand Canyon in 1914. The Forest Service also considered legal action against the claims but deferred any action over concerns that a suit would enrage local opinion against the service. Control of vendors at the canyon presented another problem, with some business using megaphones to attract tourists. To deal with this, the Forest service adapted a policy of "regulated competition". This displaced a number of small independent vendors and granted virtual monopolies to the Fred Harvey Company and Santa Fe railroad.

In 1914, Cameron filed another application for a patent on his Cape Horn mining claim. The next year the Forest Service filed suit to block the application. In 1916, a suit was filed to invalidate Cameron's mining claims at Indians Gardens. This second suit was placed on hold pending resolution of the first case. The first case made its way the United States Supreme Court which ruled in favor of the government on April 19, 1920. The courts invalidated Cameron's Indian Gardens claims in February 1921. On top of this, President Wilson signed into law a bill creating the Grand Canyon National Park on February 26, 1919. Despite the growing number of obstacles to his claims, Cameron remained optimistic of his chances to control important sections of the Grand Canyon. This confidence was bolstered by the fact that mining claims he had staked in 1902 had not been challenged and improvements in his political outlook as the 1920s dawned.

By 1920, many Arizona voters were tiring of Woodrow Wilson's policies and desired the "normalcy" offered by Republican challenger Warren G. Harding. With Republican opportunities looking favorable for the coming election, Cameron decided to challenge Mark Smith for a seat in the United States Senate. Cameron defeated three other challengers during the September 7 primary to win the Republican nomination. Cameron's primary campaign promise was to win a $12 million appropriation to build a dam on the Gila River near San Carlos, Arizona. A second promise to the American Legion was to reallocate 100,000 to 150,000 acres (40,000 to 61,000 ha) of the Colorado River Indian Reservation and give the land to war veterans for settlement. He also told the voters how a pair of hydroelectric dams in the Grand Canyon could "electrify every railroad, mine, mill, city, town and hamlet in Arizona." During the run up to the general election, the 69-year-old Smith seemed to lack the vitality of his younger opponent. Cameron won the election by a vote of 35,893 to 28,169.

== U.S. Senate ==
Upon taking office, Cameron was assigned to the United States Senate Committee on Indian Affairs, Military Affairs, Irrigation and Reclamation, and the District of Columbia. Shortly after taking office, Cameron faced several legal challenges. First, a Boston man filed a $100,000 suit against Cameron claiming alienation of affections on March 27, 1921. Cameron had met the man casually on a train in 1913 and his wife had left him in 1916. Cameron denied the allegations and promised to "fight this suit with both fists, fearlessly and in the open." As Arizona law established a four-year statute of limitations on suits of this type the case was quietly dismissed. This was followed by an indictment on the charge of perjury on October 24, 1921.

The charges against the senator claimed he had failed to properly report donations he had received during his 1920 Senate race. Cameron's attorney's pointed out during a May 11, 1922, preliminary hearing that while campaign finance laws at the time required reporting of expenditures there was no requirement to report any received donations. The judge overseeing the case agreed with Cameron's attorneys and dismissed the charges on May 17.

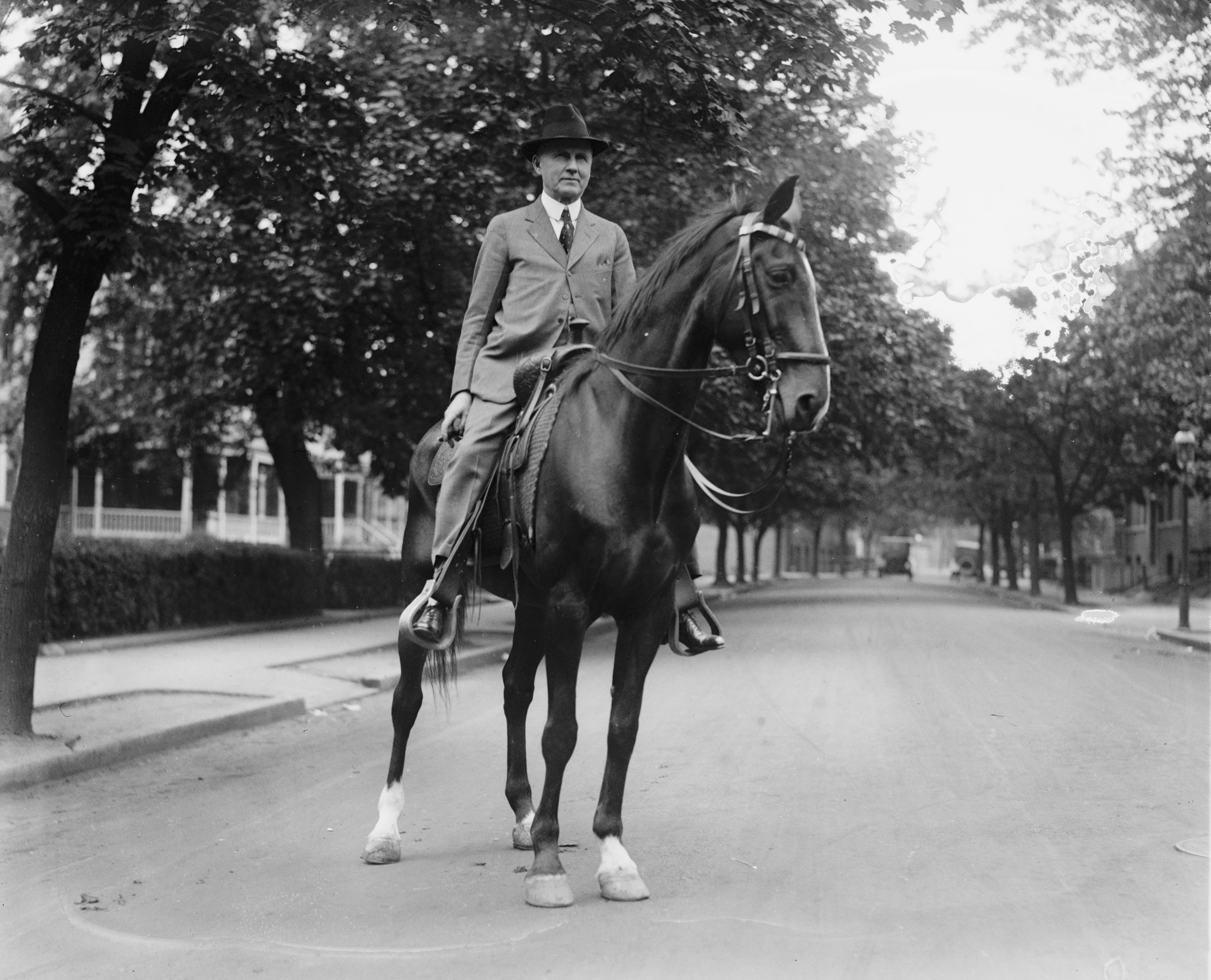
Senator Ralph Cameron (c. 1921)

Upon returning to the Senate, Cameron voted for the Fordney–McCumber Tariff. He was unsuccessful in efforts to establish a tariff on cotton imports. He voted for the Bonus Bill but later voted against overturning President Harding's veto. When the Bonus Bill came back up in 1924, Cameron voted for the legislation again and supported overturning President Coolidge's veto.

Cameron began efforts to have Stephen Mather removed as director of the National Park Service shortly after taking office. Mather was politically well connected and able to retain his position. When it became evident to Cameron that he could not remove Mather, he turned to having appointees favorable to his cause named to the Land Office in Phoenix, the Surveyor General of Arizona, and the U.S. District Court for the District of Arizona. After Cameron's brother-in-law, L. L. Ferrall, was named postmaster for the Grand Canyon, park rangers began to complain that their mail was being opened before they received it. To counter the perceived threat, park officials began sending official communications in code and having their mail addressed to their wives or friends.

His seat in the Senate allowed Cameron to strike at the Park Service through their funding. In February 1922, he claimed that funding to develop the Grand Canyon National Park would result in camping sites for just "thirty or forty millionaires" and managed to have the appropriation removed from the bill to fund the Interior Department. Arizona's other congressional representatives, Carl Hayden and Henry F. Ashurst, fought to restore the funding but Cameron was able to block the efforts for several months. Eventually the Senate authorized $75,000 for the Grand Canyon National Park, down from $100,000 in 1921.

Cameron additionally used his political position to try to regain control of the Bright Angel Trail, which he still claimed to own. In May 1922 he offered to pay Coconino County $1,875/year for a five-year lease on the trail. This would allow Cameron to continue to charge trail users $1.00 for each horse or mule using the trail. The county declined the senator's offer after the Santa Fe railroad made a higher bid. In March 1923, Hayden and Congressman Louis C. Cramton of Michigan met with representatives of the county, Park Service, and Fred Harvey company to discuss purchasing the trail. The proposal agreed to at the meeting called for a $100,000 appropriation to build a dirt access road from a railroad station to the canyon. After learning of the proposal, Cameron worked against the plan for the Federal government to purchase the trail. Toward this end he argued that with the Federal Government owning 75% or more of the land in Coconino County, and thus rendering the land nontaxable by the county, the $7–8,000 of toll revenue generated by the trail was vital to the county. Congressman Cramton countered the senator's claims and accused Cameron of retaining illegal interests in the trail via his mining claims. A compromise was reached in late March 1924 where a provision requiring county voters approve the sale was approved by Congress. By this time, the Coconino Sun, which had traditionally been a Cameron supporter, accused the senator of using the county as a pawn in his efforts to retain control of the trail and urged voters to approve the sale. County voters rejected the sale 1,247 to 755.

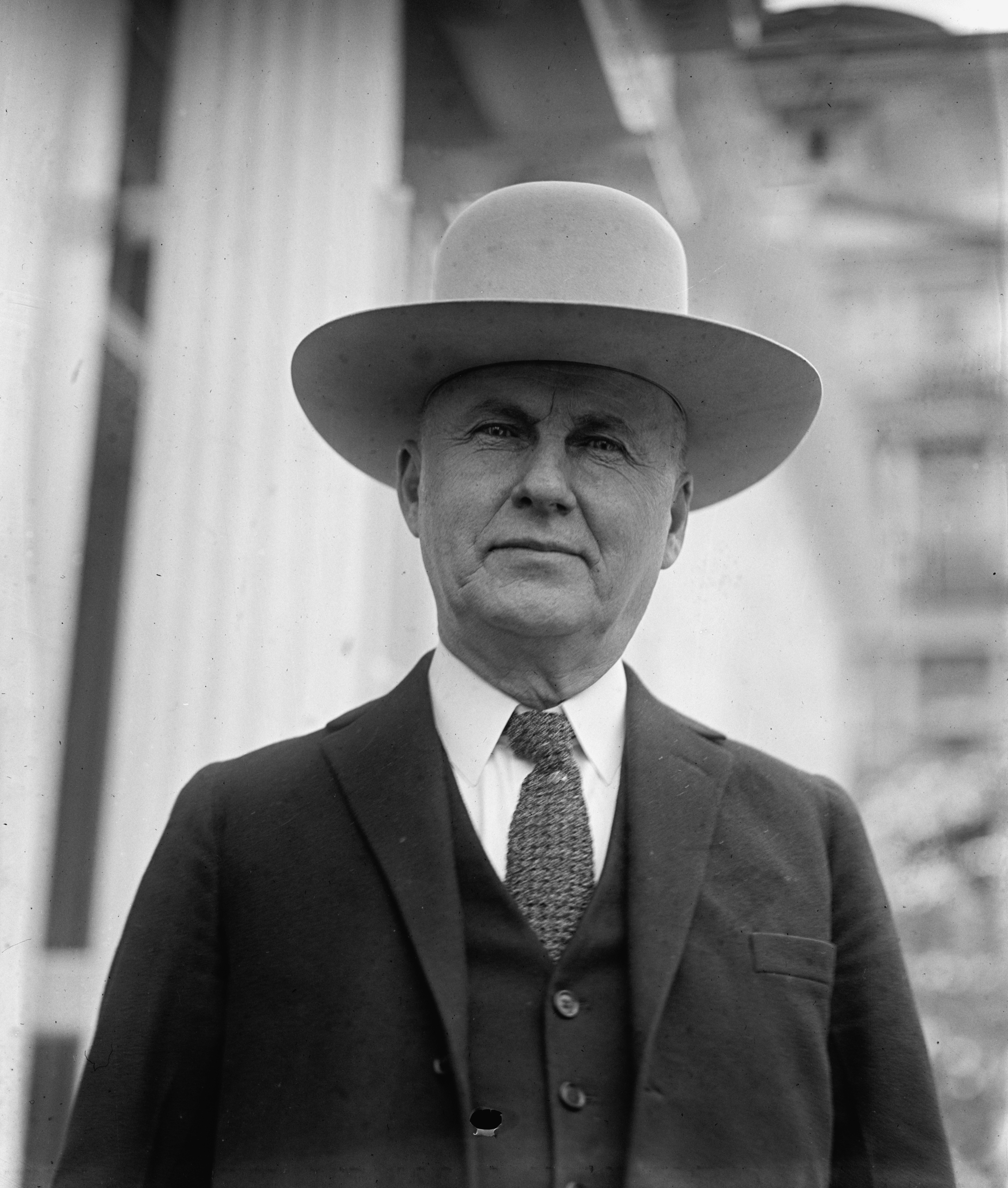
Senator Ralph H. Cameron (c. 1924)

Cameron's greatest legislative success came in 1924 when he and Carl Hayden obtained a $5,500,000 appropriation for construction of the Coolidge Dam. The year also brought the first of several legal setbacks. In August 1924, a lawsuit attempting to force Cameron to remove employees and building along the Bright Angel Trail resulted a contempt charge being brought against the senator. Cameron's lawyers were unsuccessful in efforts to make the charge go away at a September 15 hearing but did obtain a two-week continuance. The charge was dropped after Cameron ordered his employees to move away from the trail. In 1925, the Federal government filed suit to have mining claims in the Grand Canyon and Boulder canyon owned by the United States Platinum Company, a firm owned by Cameron and several other partners, disqualified on the basis that the claim sites did not have extractable concentrations of platinum. A December 16, 1925, ruling invalidated the claims. Other mining claims were also challenged but the challenges were delayed by Cameron's brother-in-law, L. L. Farrell, who was then registrar of the General Land Office in Phoenix. The Commissioner of the General Land Office, William Spry, overruled Farrell in January 1926 and invalidated Cameron's other mining claims. The senator responded by getting a bill passed that created a congressional committee authorized to investigate the Agriculture and Interior departments. Cameron was appointed the committee's chairman and focused most of the committee's attention on the director of the National Park Service.

The legal losses began affecting Cameron's political fortunes, with voters starting to see him as self-serving. To counter this, he introduced a number of legislative initiatives designed to aid his constituents. In January 1925, the senator won a $200,000 appropriation for a new irrigation system near Yuma. This was followed the next month with a $650,000 allocation for upkeep of the system. Cameron attempted to establish a 6¢/pound tariff on copper imports, claiming the tax would "permit the [American] copper miner to reenergize the dying copper industry of his homeland", but unsuccessful in his efforts. His efforts to remove all grazing fees on Federal land resulted in a 50% reduction in fees charged. Cameron was also a leader in Arizona's efforts to prevent construction of Boulder Dam.

During the 1926 election, Cameron received the support of Republican leaders but only tepid support from rank and file membership. In contrast, his challenger, Congressman Carl Hayden, in turn had a united party, the backing of labor, and the support of the Woman's Christian Temperance Union. Cameron campaigned on a message highlighting his successes during his first term. Democrats countered by claiming his successes were joint Republican and Democratic efforts and that his inability to win a cotton tariff showed him to be ineffective. A series of six article written by Hayden supporter Will Irwin was published by the Los Angeles Times in mid 1926. These articles examined Cameron's history with the Grand Canyon and claimed he had salted several claims in the canyon in order to control the valuable sites. Cameron condemned the articles' claims as "malicious fabrications" but the political damage had already been done. Hayden won the election by a vote of 44,591 to 31,845. The election loss combined with his legal defeats ended Cameron's influence in the Grand Canyon.

== Later life ==
After leaving office, Cameron ran in 1928 for the U.S. Senate seat held by Henry F. Ashurst. He won the Republican nomination but lost to the incumbent in the general election. He ran again in 1932, trying to regain his old Senate seat but was again defeated by Carl Hayden. Cameron then left Arizona, living for a time in both Philadelphia and Los Angeles. He made a living working mining projects in Arizona, California, Georgia, and North Carolina. In 1933, Cameron divorced his first wife. He married his second wife, Elizabeth Reese, on August 19, 1935.

By the early 1950s, Cameron had returned to Arizona. His health was failing at the time and he underwent two major operations. His final project was development of a medical hot springs center near Yuma intended to treat arthritis and polio cases. While on a business trip to Washington, D.C., Cameron suffered a heart attack on February 7, 1953. While recovering, he developed bronchial pneumonia and died on February 12, 1953. He was buried in Grand Canyon Village, Arizona. The epitaph on his grave marker says "Secured Statehood for Arizona Feb. 14, 1912. Arizona can never forget him." The community of Cameron, Arizona, is named after him.

== See also ==
- List of federal political scandals in the United States

Party political offices
First	Republican nominee for U.S. Senator from Arizona (Class 1); 1912	Succeeded by Joseph Henry Kibbey
Preceded by Edmund W. Wells	Republican nominee for Governor of Arizona; 1914	Succeeded by Thomas Edward Campbell
Preceded by Don Lorenzo Hubbell	Republican nominee for U.S. Senator from Arizona (Class 3); 1920, 1926, 1932	Succeeded by Burt H. Clingan
Preceded by James Harvey McClintock	Republican nominee for U.S. Senator from Arizona (Class 1); 1928	Succeeded by Joseph Edward Thompson
U.S. House of Representatives
Preceded by Marcus A. Smith	Delegate to the U.S. House of Representatives from Arizona Territory; 1909–1912	Succeeded by Statehood granted Carl T. Hayden as United States Representative for Arizona.
U.S. Senate
Preceded by Marcus A. Smith	United States Senator (Class 3) from Arizona; 1921–1927; Served alongside: Henry F. Ashurst	Succeeded by Carl Hayden
