= Grandview Mine =

United States historic place in Arizona

- U.S. National Register of Historic Places
- U.S. Historic district
- Grandview/Last Chance Mine, circa 1900

- Location within Arizona Location within the United States
- Location: Grand Canyon National Park, Grand Canyon, Arizona
- Coordinates: 36°1′5″N 111°58′32″W
- Built: 1892
- NRHP reference No.: 74000347
- Added to NRHP: July 09, 1974

The Grandview Mine, also known as the Last Chance Mine, was operated by Pete Berry from 1892 until 1901 in what later became Grand Canyon National Park. The Grandview Mine Historic District includes what remains of the mine workings and machinery as well as the ruins of a stone house and sleeping shanty. Physical evidence, including low stone walls and construction debris, suggests that several wood structures were also originally present on the site.

Pete Berry established Last Chance Mine on Horseshoe Mesa in 1892. He constructed the four-mile Grandview Trail down to the copper mine, and in 1893 began hauling ore out by mule. Although the ore was over 70% pure copper and won a prize at the Columbian Exposition in Chicago, the mine did not prove profitable, and in 1901 Berry and his partners sold it to the Canyon Copper Company, who operated it until 1907. The mine was then acquired by William Randolph Hearst, who sold it to the National Park Service in 1940.

The mineralization at the mine is secondary copper minerals in a breccia zone along a monocline flexure in the Redwall Limestone, which is bleached, brecciated and marbleized below the overlying Supai Group. Grandview is the type locality for grandviewite, a copper aluminium silicate. Grandview produced exceptionally fine mineral specimens of cyanotrichite, brochantite, chalcoalumite, and many other copper and uranium minerals. These specimens are now rare, as mineral collecting is not permitted in the National Park.

In 2009, the mines were gated to protect bat roosts, support on-going bat research, preserve historic mine resources, and promote visitor safety. The gating project was done by Mine Gates, Inc., with support from Grand Canyon National Park, Bat Conservational International, and Freeport-McMoRan. Details of the mine site, as well as manufacturing and installation of each bat gate are documented on the MineGates site.

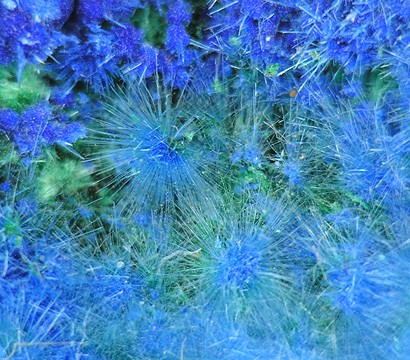
Cyanotrichite crystals from the Grandview mine

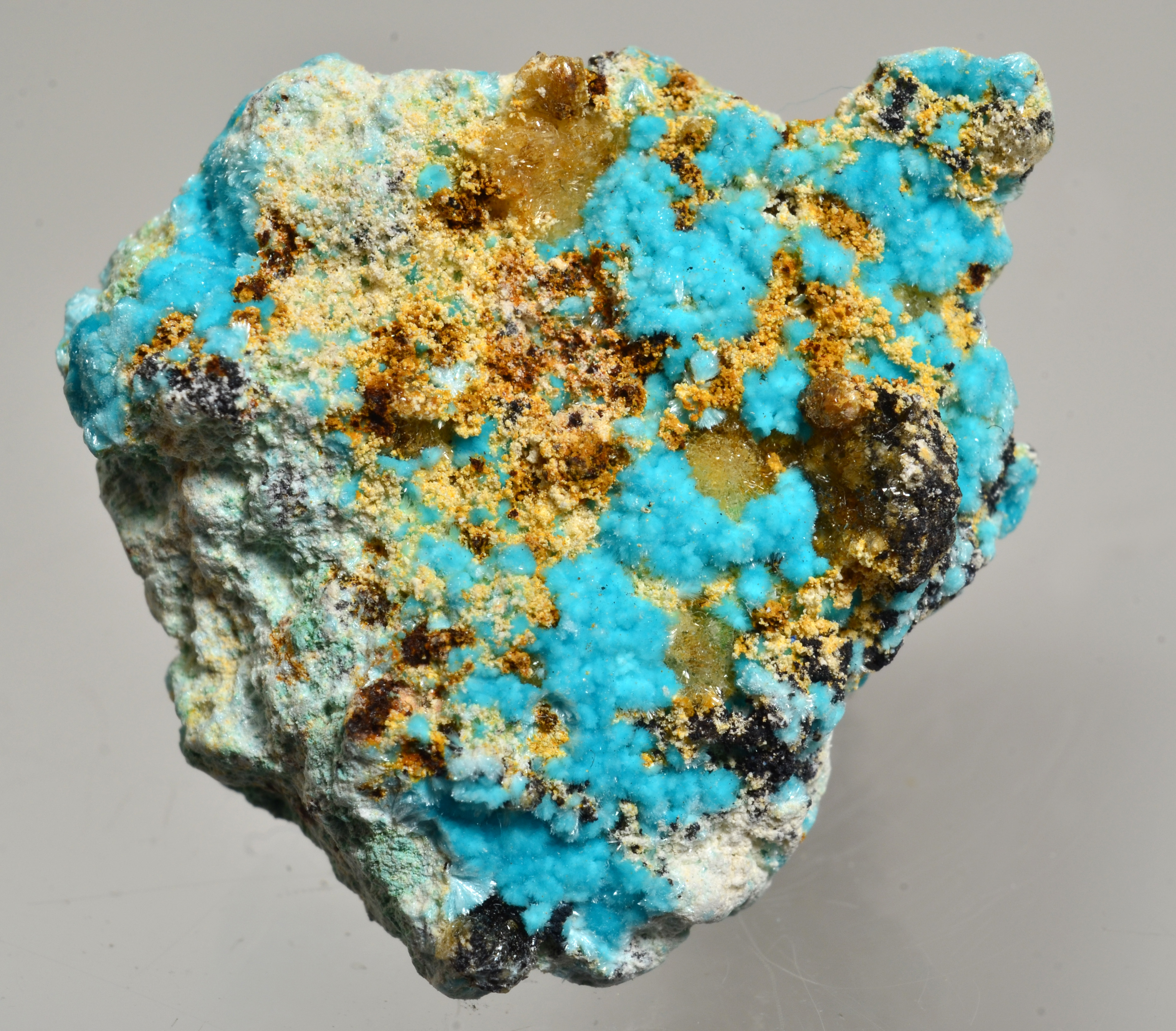
Grandviewite from the Grandview Mine, the type locality.
