= 1920 United States Senate election in Arizona =

- November 2, 1920
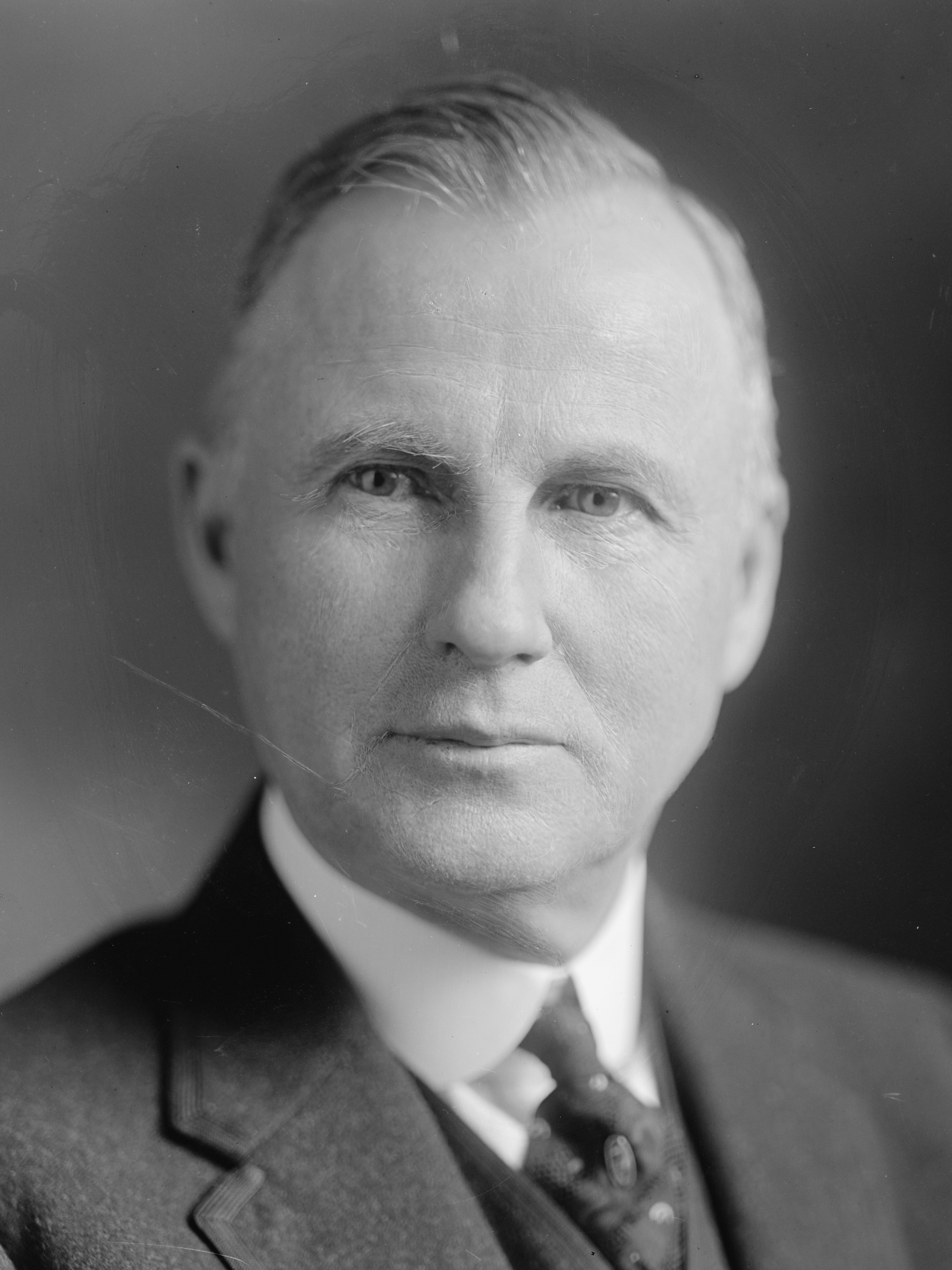

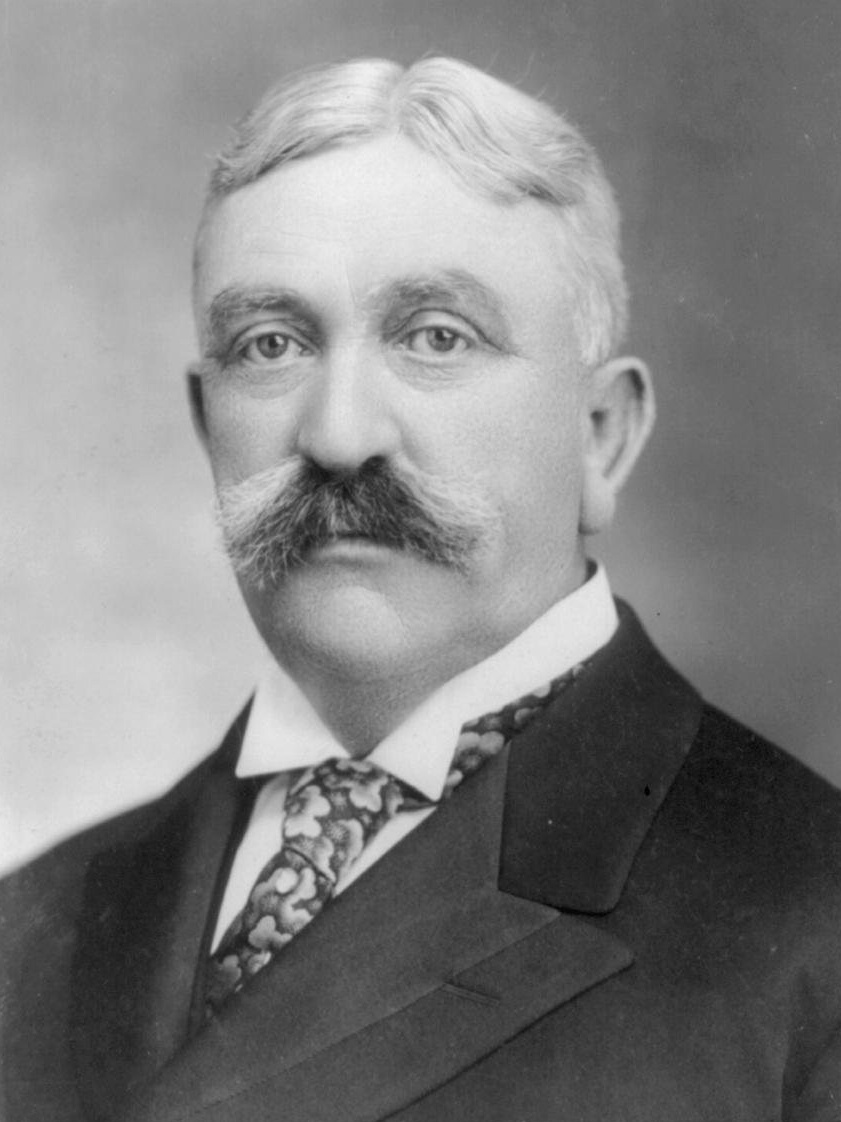
Nominee	Ralph H. Cameron	Marcus A. Smith
Party	Republican	Democratic
Popular vote	35,893	29,169
Percentage	55.17%	44.83%
- County results Cameron: 50–60% 60–70% Smith: 50–60% 60–70%
U.S. senator before election
Marcus A. Smith
Democratic
Elected U.S. Senator
Ralph H. Cameron
Republican

The 1920 United States Senate election in Arizona took place on November 2, 1920. Incumbent Democratic U.S. Senator Marcus A. Smith ran for reelection to a third term, but was defeated by former Delegate to the U.S. House of Representatives from the Arizona Territory Ralph H. Cameron in the general election. Cameron would become the first Republican elected to the office of U.S. Senator from Arizona since the state joined the union in 1912. The same year, Republican Governor Thomas Edward Campbell was reelected to a second term. This was the last time until 1968 that a Republican would be elected to the Class 3 Senate seat in Arizona.

== Democratic primary ==
The Democratic primary took place on September 8, 1920. Incumbent U.S. Senator Marcus A. Smith was the recipient of a significant challenge in the Democratic primary, notably by Maricopa County Superior Court judge Rawghlie Clement Stanford, who would go on to become Arizona's fifth Governor in 1937. Fellow lawyer Albinus A. Worsley, as well as John W. Norton also ran in the primary. Smith narrowly staved off his primary challengers and went on to compete in the general election in November.

=== Candidates ===
- Marcus A. Smith, incumbent U.S. Senator
- Rawghlie Clement Stanford, Maricopa County Superior Court
- Albinus A. Worsley, lawyer
- John W. Norton

=== Results ===
Democratic primary results
Party	Candidate	Votes	%
Democratic	Marcus A. Smith (incumbent)	10,910	37.1%
Democratic	Rawghlie Clement Stanford	8,400	28.5%
Democratic	Albinus A. Worsley	7,474	25.4%
Democratic	John W. Norton	2,651	9.0%
Total votes		29,435	100.0

== Republican primary ==
=== Candidates ===
- Ralph H. Cameron, Delegate to the U.S. House of Representatives from the Arizona Territory
- Elias S. Clark, Arizona Territorial Attorney General
- Thomas Maddock, Arizona State Highway Engineer
- Edward Robinson

=== Results ===
Republican primary results
Party	Candidate	Votes	%
Republican	Ralph H. Cameron	4,587	40.7%
Republican	Elias S. Clark	3,941	34.9%
Republican	Thomas Maddock	2,194	19.4%
Republican	Edward Robinson	563	5.0%
Total votes		11,285	100.0

== General election ==
United States Senate election in Arizona, 1920
Party	Candidate	Votes	%	±%
Republican	Ralph H. Cameron	35,893	55.17%	+36.22%
Democratic	Marcus A. Smith (incumbent)	29,169	44.83%	−8.40%
Majority		6,724	10.33%	−23.95%
Turnout		65,062		
Republican gain from Democratic		Swing		

== See also ==
- United States Senate elections, 1920 and 1921
