= 1914 Arizona gubernatorial election =

- November 3, 1914
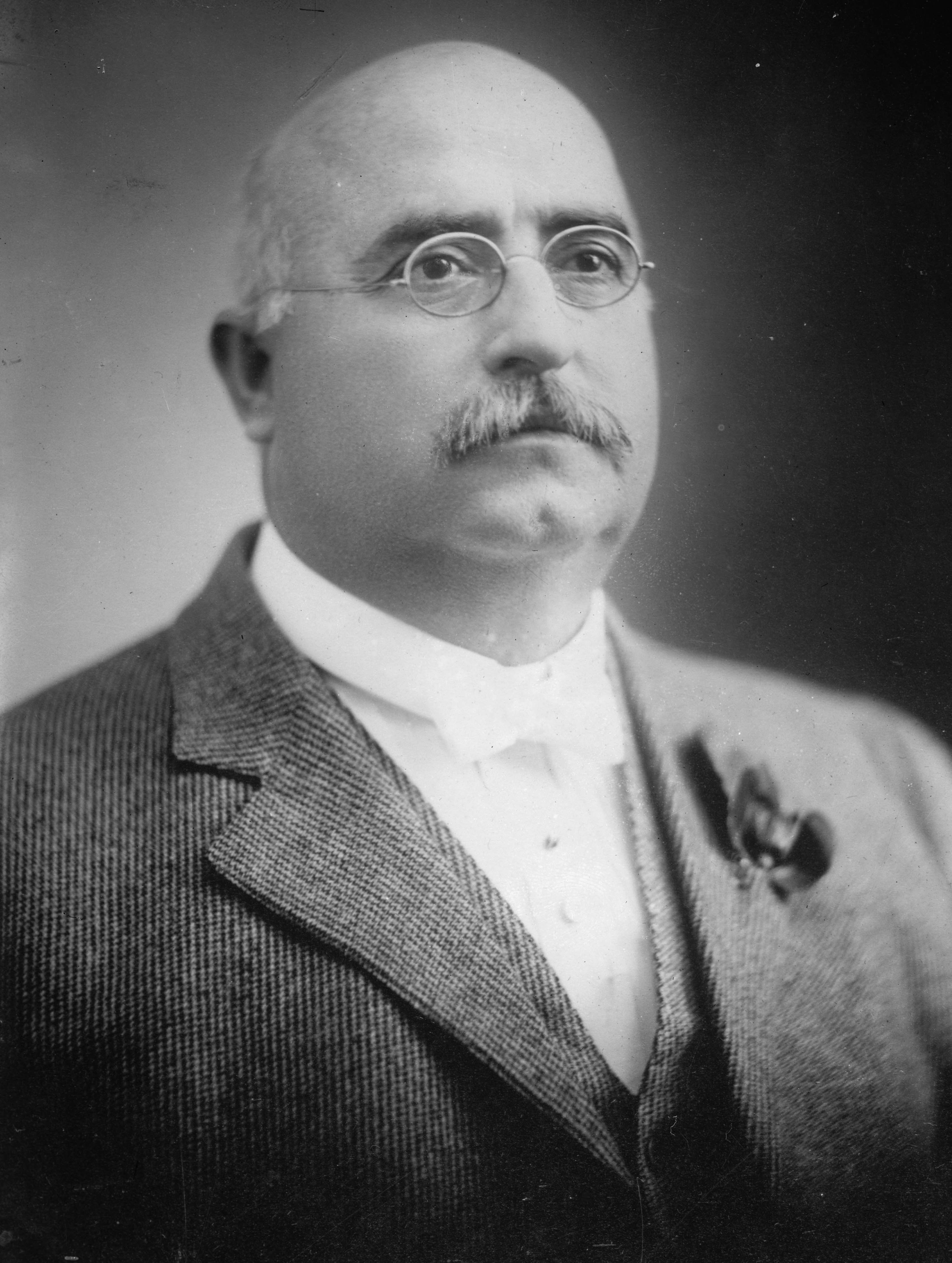

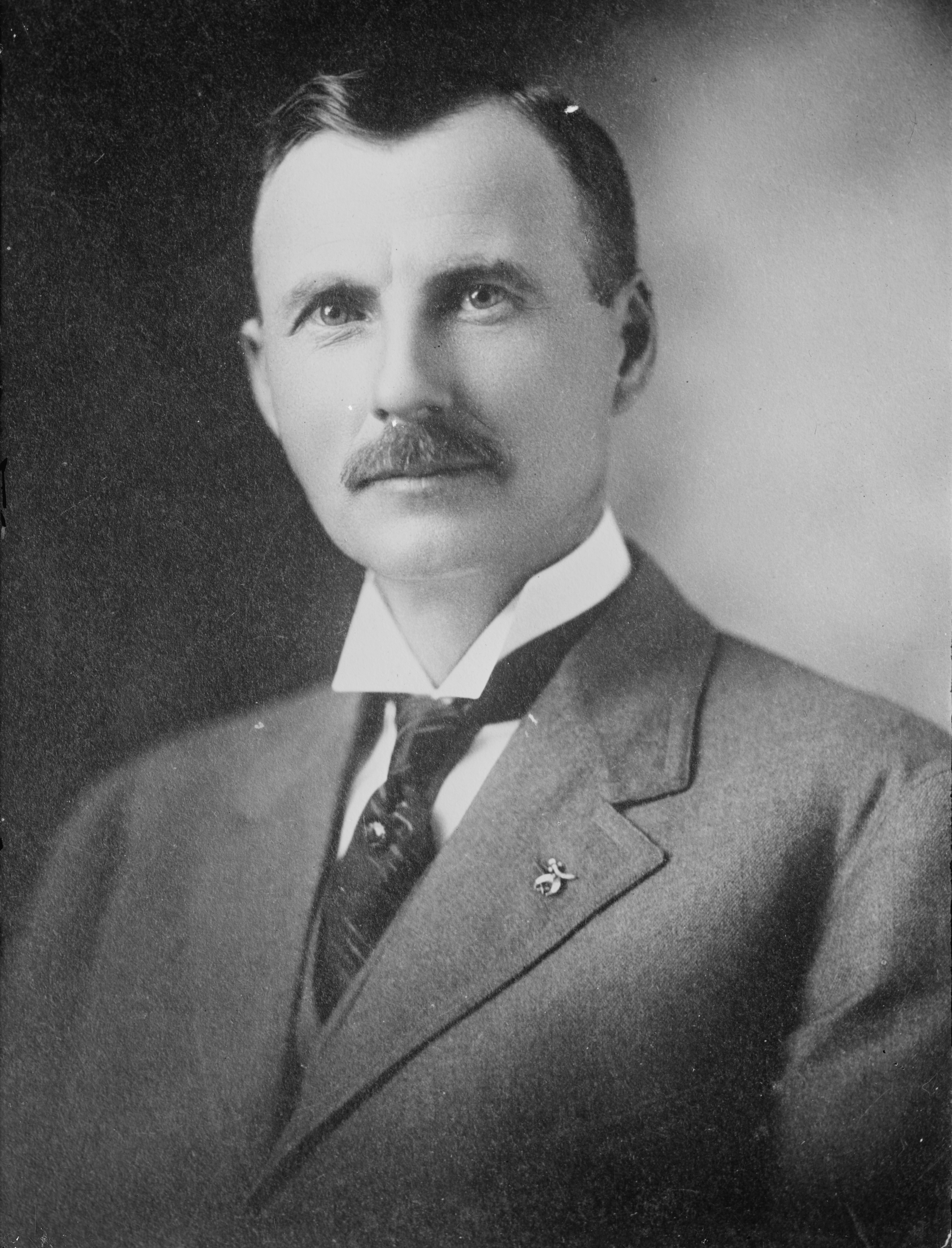

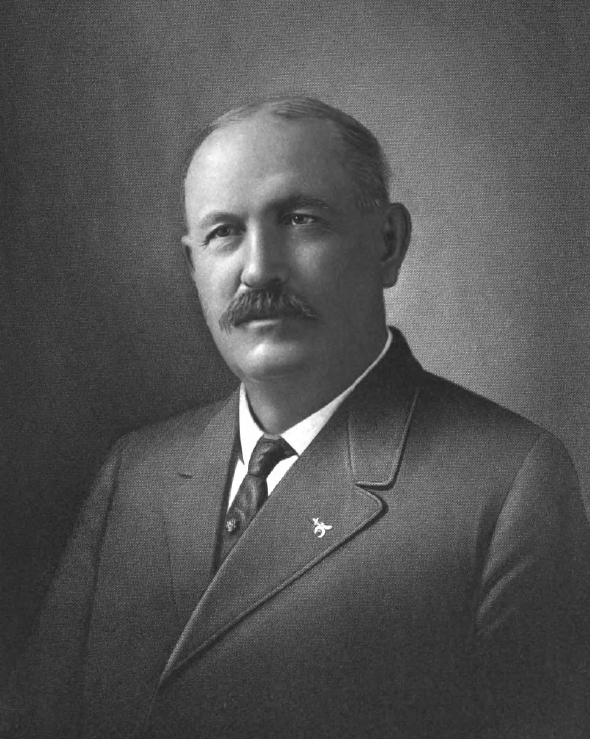

Nominee	George W. P. Hunt	Ralph H. Cameron
Party	Democratic	Republican
Popular vote	25,226	17,602
Percentage	49.46%	34.51%
Nominee	George U. Young	J. R. Barnette
Party	Progressive	Socialist
Popular vote	5,206	2,973
Percentage	10.20%	5.83%
- County results Hunt: 40–50% 50–60% 60–70% Cameron: 40–50%
Governor before election
George W. P. Hunt
Democratic
Elected Governor
George W. P. Hunt
Democratic

The 1914 Arizona gubernatorial election took place on November 3, 1914, for the post of the governor of Arizona. The Supreme Court of Arizona ruled that there would be no statewide elections in 1912, thus extending the terms to sync up with elections on even years. The Democratic nominee was incumbent governor George W. P. Hunt, his Republican opponent was the final Delegate to Congress from Arizona Territory, Ralph H. Cameron. Cameron was disadvantaged by the same reason the previous Republican nominee Wells was: he had opposed statehood with the present Constitution.

Two third parties also made strong challenges, the Progressives polled over 10% with nominee George Young, the final Territorial Secretary and then-mayor of Phoenix. The Socialists held around the same percentage of votes as in 1911, increasing slightly, but would peak here and never reach the same height.

George W. P. Hunt was sworn in again as governor on January 4, 1915.

== Democratic primary ==
=== Candidates ===
- George W. P. Hunt, incumbent governor
- Henry A. Hughes, physician and former Democratic primary candidate for governor.

=== Race ===
As of May 1914, Hunt had still not officially declared his intention to run for re-election. By that point in time, there were already two other Democrats who had announced their intention to run for the Democratic nomination: Fred Sutter and Henry A. Hughes. Sutter had been the Superior Court Judge from Cochise County from 1912 until his resignation in July 1913. When he resigned, he had stated his intention to never run for elected office again. However, in February 1914, when Democratic leaders began to float his name as a possible candidate in the Democratic primary for the governor's seat, he did not disavow those rumors. By March it was reported that he would be the conservative Democratic candidate in the primary, to oppose the more liberal Hunt, and he officially announced his candidacy by mid-March. Within a month, Sutter was considered the front runner for the nomination, over the incumbent Hunt. There were rumors that Hunt would seek the U.S. Senate seat, rather than another term as governor. Sutter's official announcement that he was a candidate for governor came on May 22 in Tucson. In order not to splinter the party, Sutter withdrew from the race in early July, announcing his support for Hunt. When Hunt officially began his candidacy for re-election in mid-July, with the submission of a petition to put his name on the ballot, the first signature on the petition was that of Sutter.

=== Results ===
Democratic primary results
Party	Candidate	Votes	%
Democratic	George W. P. Hunt (incumbent)	18,658	65.37%
Democratic	Henry A. Hughes	9,885	34.63%
Total votes		28,543	100.00%

== General election ==
=== Results ===
Arizona gubernatorial election, 1914
Party	Candidate	Votes	%	±%
Democratic	George W. P. Hunt (incumbent)	25,226	49.46%	−2.00%
Republican	Ralph Cameron	17,602	34.51%	−7.90%
Progressive	George U. Young	5,206	10.20%	+10.20%
Socialist	J. R. Barnette	2,973	5.83%	+0.06%
Majority		7,624	14.95%	
Total votes		51,007	100.00%	
Democratic hold		Swing	+5.89%	

=== Results by county ===
County	George W. P. Hunt Democratic		Ralph Cameron Republican		George U. Young Progressive		J. R. Barnette Socialist		Margin		Total votes cast
County	#	%	#	%	#	%	#	%	#	%	Total votes cast
Apache	549	62.74%	254	29.03%	58	6.63%	14	1.60%	295	33.71%	875
Cochise	4,700	56.11%	2,371	28.31%	837	9.99%	468	5.59%	2,329	27.81%	8,376
Coconino	976	48.03%	886	43.60%	122	6.00%	48	2.36%	90	4.43%	2,032
Gila	2,189	48.48%	1,552	34.37%	91	2.02%	683	15.13%	637	14.11%	4,515
Graham	1,096	51.43%	747	35.05%	105	4.93%	183	8.59%	349	16.38%	2,131
Greenlee	1,144	51.91%	830	37.66%	89	4.04%	141	6.40%	314	14.25%	2,204
Maricopa	6,223	44.60%	4,455	31.93%	2,634	18.88%	640	4.59%	1,768	12.67%	13,952
Mohave	947	63.77%	358	24.11%	27	1.82%	153	10.30%	589	39.66%	1,485
Navajo	897	51.37%	749	42.90%	51	2.92%	49	2.81%	148	8.48%	1,746
Pima	1,590	39.44%	1,892	46.94%	449	11.14%	100	2.48%	-302	-7.49%	4,031
Pinal	850	46.07%	695	37.67%	240	13.01%	60	3.25%	155	8.40%	1,845
Santa Cruz	608	55.17%	439	39.84%	22	2.00%	33	2.99%	169	15.34%	1,102
Yavapai	2,137	46.42%	1,889	41.03%	321	6.97%	257	5.58%	248	5.39%	4,604
Yuma	1,320	62.59%	485	23.00%	160	7.59%	144	6.83%	835	39.59%	2,109
Totals	25,226	49.46%	17,602	34.51%	5,206	10.21%	2,973	5.83%	7,624	14.95%	51,007

==== Counties that flipped from Republican to Democratic ====
- Apache
- Coconino
- Navajo
- Yavapai

== Bibliography ==
- Goff, John S. (1973). "The First Years of Statehood". George W. P. Hunt and his Arizona. Phoenix: Socio-Technical Publications. pp. 62–64.
