= 1926 United States Senate election in Arizona =

- November 3, 1926
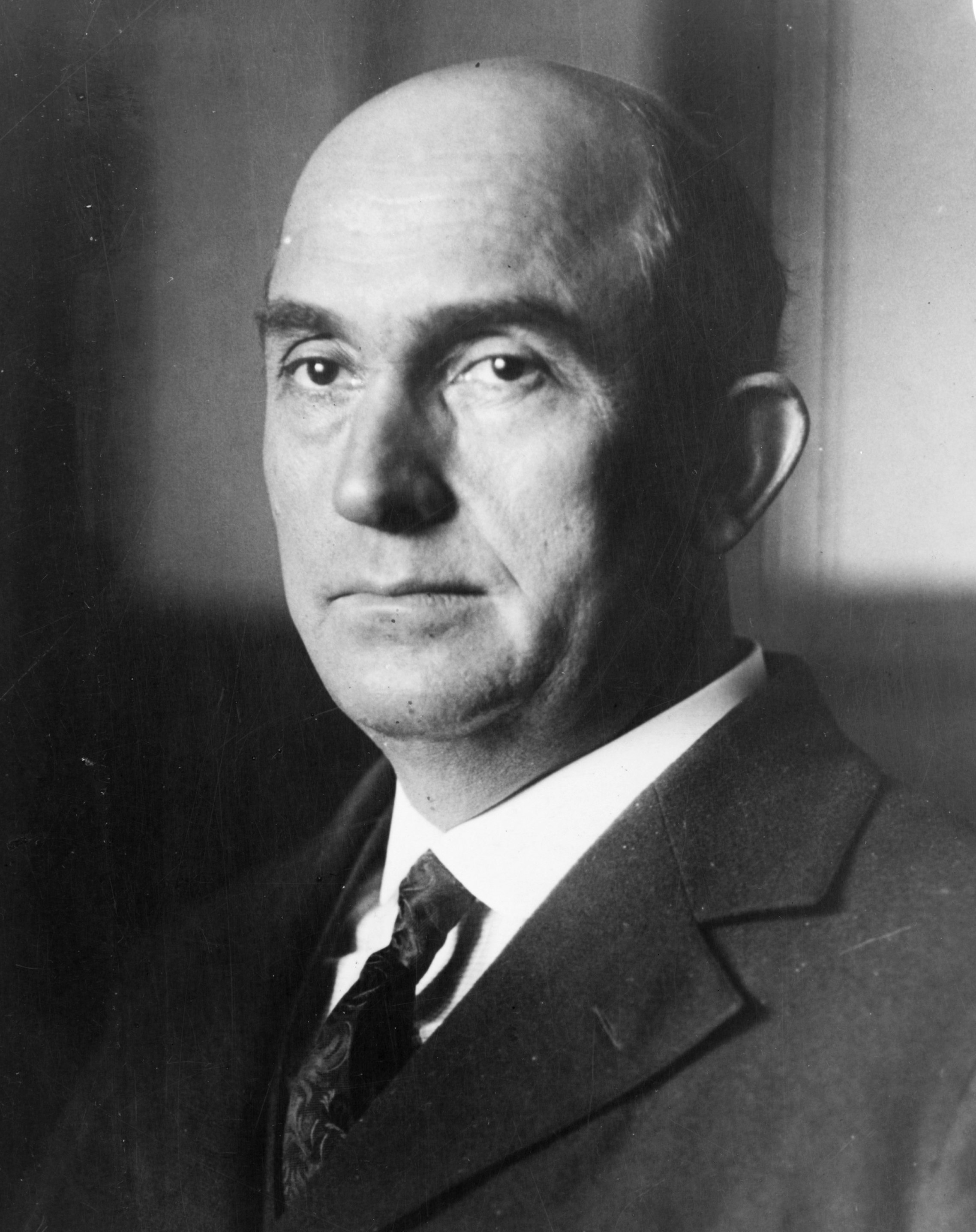

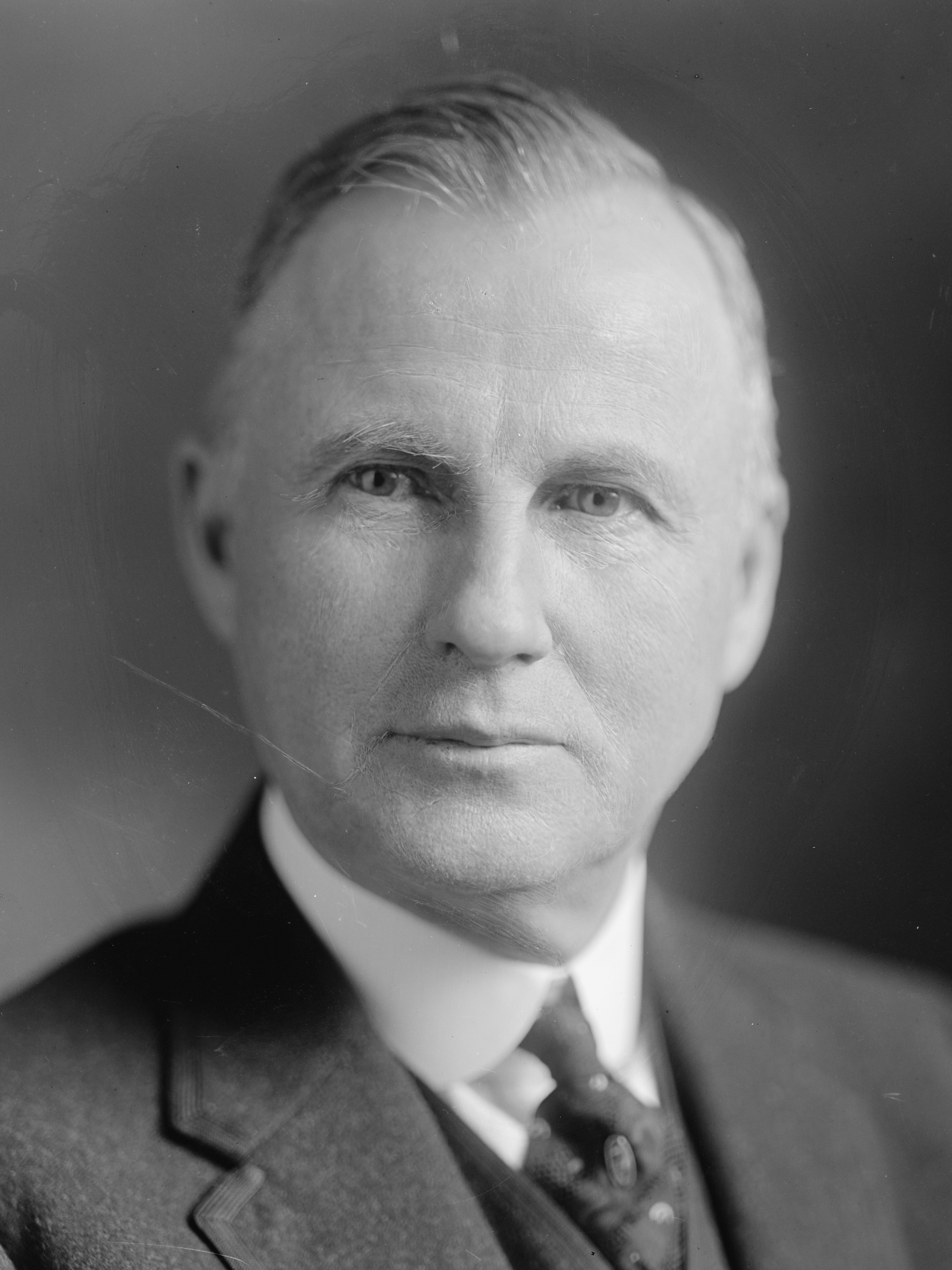
Nominee	Carl Hayden	Ralph H. Cameron
Party	Democratic	Republican
Popular vote	44,591	31,845
Percentage	58.34%	41.66%
- County results Hayden: 50–60% 60–70% 70–80% Cameron: 50–60%
U.S. senator before election
Ralph H. Cameron
Republican
Elected U.S. Senator
Carl Hayden
Democratic

The 1926 United States Senate election in Arizona was held on Tuesday November 3, Incumbent Republican Senator Ralph Cameron ran for re-election on his second term, but was defeated by incumbent Democratic Representative Carl Hayden in the general election. Hayden eventually became the longest-serving Senator being re-elected to six more terms until he retired in 1968. To date, this was the last time that an incumbent Senator from Arizona lost re-election to the Class 3 Senate seat in Arizona. (Note: Martha McSally lost re-election to Mark Kelly in 2020, but she had been appointed to the seat after the resignation of Jon Kyl, who himself was appointed to the seat after the death of John McCain.)

== Republican primary ==
=== Candidates ===
- Ralph H. Cameron, incumbent U.S. Senator

== Democratic primary ==
=== Candidates ===
- Carl T. Hayden, U.S. Congressman of Arizona's at-large Congressional district
- Charles H. Rutherford, Previous Arizona State Senator

=== Results ===
Democratic primary results
Party	Candidate	Votes	%
Democratic	Carl T. Hayden	36,745	80.3%
Democratic	Charles H. Rutherford	8,995	19.7%
Total votes		45,740	100.0

== General election ==
=== Campaign ===
Cameron received the support of Republican leaders but only tepid support from rank and file membership. In contrast, his challenger, Congressman Carl Hayden, in turn had a united party, the backing of labor, and the support of the Woman's Christian Temperance Union. Cameron campaigned on a message highlighting his successes during his first term. Democrats countered by highlighting his inability to win a cotton tariff, showing him to be ineffective.

A series of six articles written by Hayden supporter Will Irwin was published by the Los Angeles Times in mid-1926. These articles examined Cameron's history with the Grand Canyon and claimed he had salted several claims in the canyon in order to control the valuable sites. Cameron condemned the articles' claims as "malicious fabrications" but the political damage had already been done. Hayden won the election by a vote of 44,591 to 31,845.

=== Results ===
United States Senate election in Arizona, 1926
Party	Candidate	Votes	%	±%
Democratic	Carl T. Hayden	44,591	58.34%	+13.51%
Republican	Ralph H. Cameron (incumbent)	31,845	41.66%	−13.51%
Majority		12,746	16.68%	+6.35%
Turnout		76,436		
Democratic gain from Republican		Swing		

== See also ==
- United States Senate elections, 1926

== Bibliography ==
- Lamb, Blaine P. (Spring 1977). "'A Many Checkered Toga': Arizona Senator Ralph H Cameron 1921–1927". Arizona and the West. 19 (1): 47–64. JSTOR 40168578.
