= Horseshoe Mesa =

Landform in the Grand Canyon, Arizona

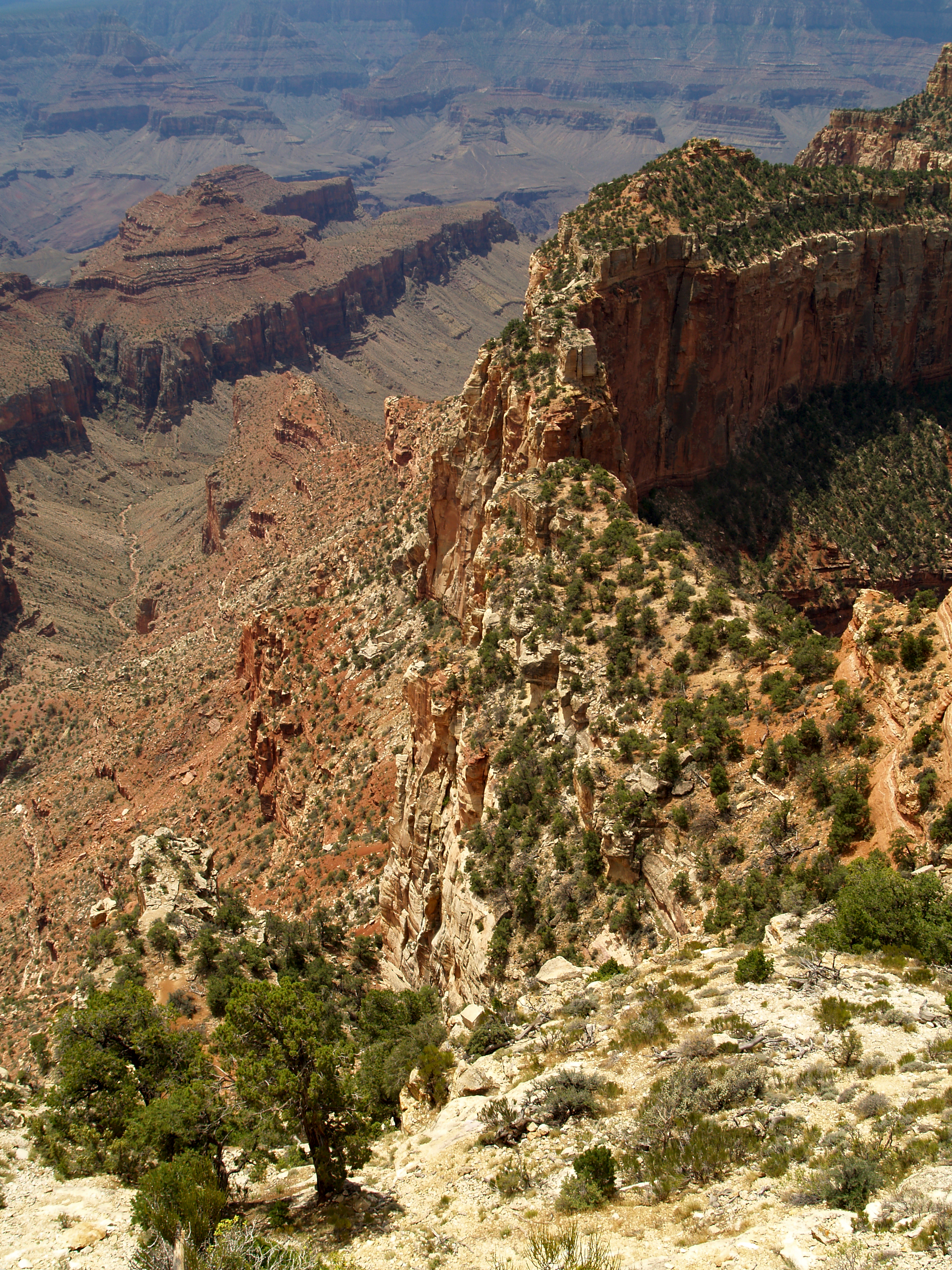
- (remote view)-Horseshoe Mesa at distance across the Colorado (Krishna Shrine and its prominence, left)

Highest point
- Elevation: 5,246 ft (1,599 m)
- Prominence: 346 ft (105 m)
- Parent peak: Unnamed butte
- Isolation: 1.16 mi (1.87 km)
- Coordinates: 36.0241°N 111.9758°W

Geography
- Location within Arizona Location within the United States
- Location: Grand Canyon National Park; Coconino County, Arizona, US
- Parent range: Kaibab Plateau; Colorado Plateau
- Topo map: USGS Cape Royal

Geology
- Rock age: Pennsylvanian down to Cambrian
- Mountain type(s): sedimentary rock: sandstone-(prominence-cliff), siltstone, mudstone, limestone, shale
- Rock type(s): Supai Group, Redwall Limestone, Muav Limestone, Bright Angel Shale

Horseshoe Mesa is a 5,246-foot-elevation mesa-summit located in the eastern Grand Canyon, in Coconino County of northern Arizona, United States. It is located 1.5 mi south of the Colorado River and Granite Gorge; also 4 mi due-south of the Cape Royal overlook, and ~2.0 mi northwest from Grandview Point, of the East South Rim, Grand Canyon. The Grandview Trail descends to Horseshoe Mesa, then drops down to meet the (mostly horizontal trail, on the Tonto Platform), the Tonto Trail.

Horseshoe Mesa is shaped like a horseshoe, legs facing due-north towards the Colorado. The mesa is a mostly flat upper platform of Redwall Limestone, with its tall cliffs elevating the mesa. A peak of Supai Group is the prominence, at the mesa's south end.
