= Grandview Trail =

Grand Canyon hiking trail

Coordinates: 35.99818°N 111.98694°W

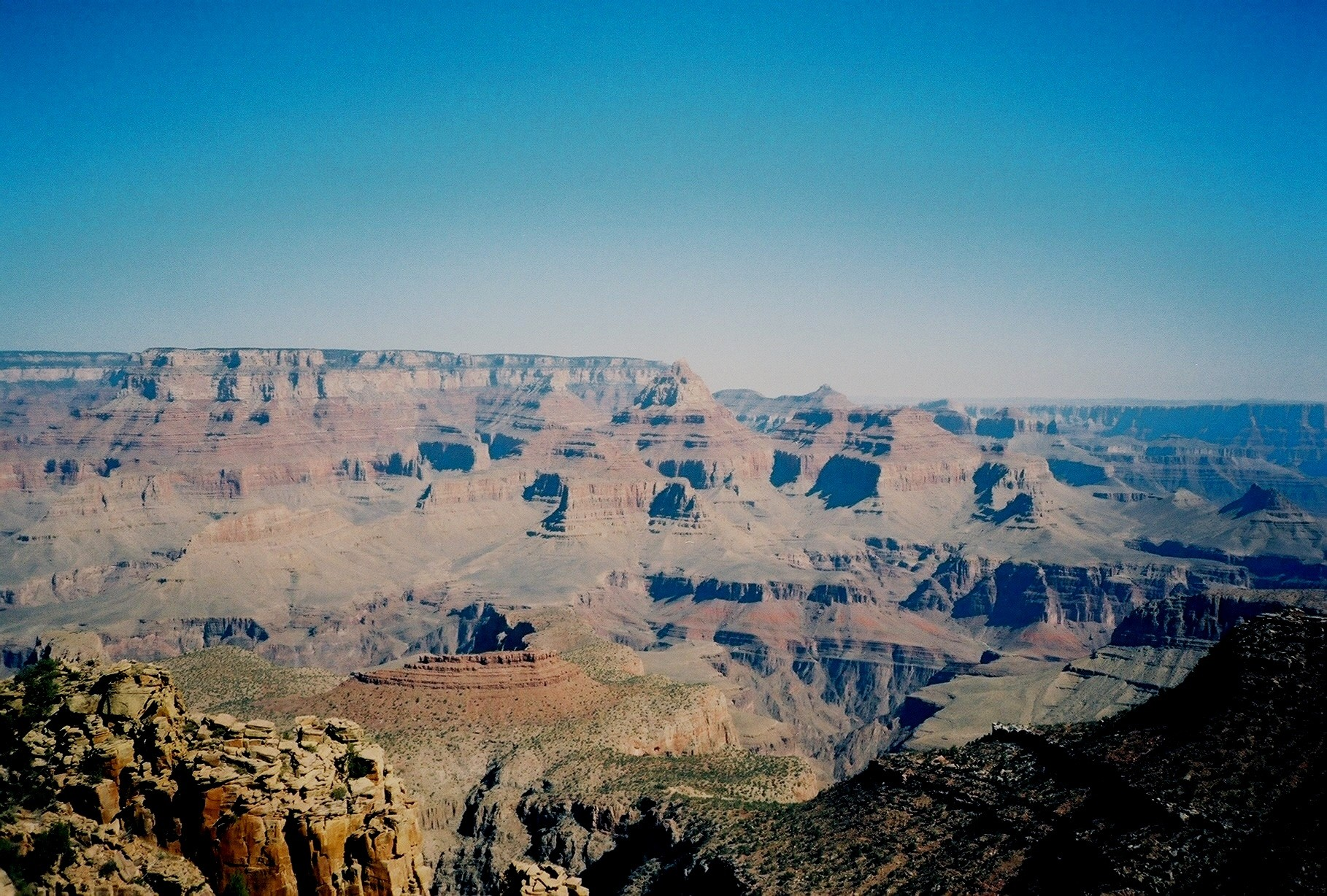
- Horseshoe Mesa (lower left) on the Grandview Trail.
- Location: Grand Canyon National Park, Arizona, United States
- Trailheads: Colorado River
- Use: Hiking
- Highest point: Grandview Point
- Sights: Grand Canyon
- Hazards: Severe Weather; Overexertion; Dehydration; Flash Flood

The Grandview Trail is a hiking trail located on the South Rim of the Grand Canyon National Park, located in the U.S. state of Arizona.It was built in 1893 by miners and is noted for its cobblestone and cribbing sections.

== Description ==
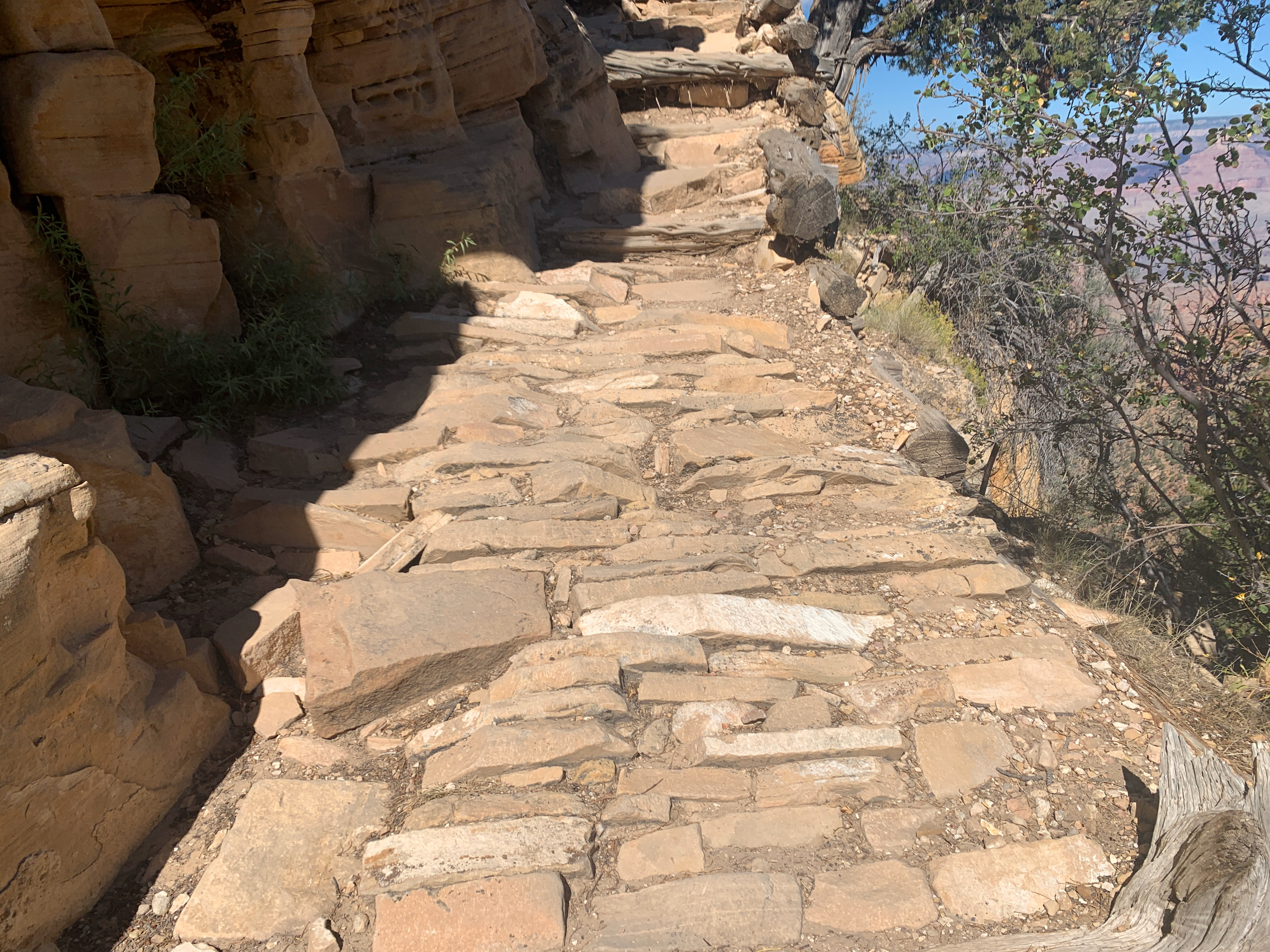
Cobblestones on the Grandview Trail.

The trail begins at the north end of the Grandview Point parking area, off of Arizona state route 64, 12 miles (19 km) east of Grand Canyon Village, Arizona. From the trail head, it makes a quick descent through the Kaibab Limestone and Toroweap Formation, making a couple of early switchbacks. Portions of this section of trail were reconstructed in the summer of 2005 after a couple of storms washed them out.

The trail generally follows the western side of the ridge that extends northeast of Grandview Point which marks a natural break in the Coconino Sandstone. The trail turns to the north and makes a final descent through the Hermit Shale and Supai Group until it reaches Horseshoe Mesa, 3 miles (5 km) from the trail head, after a descent of 2,500 feet (760 m).

Camping is allowed on the mesa in designated areas on its eastern side and by permit only. Permits are issued by the Backcountry Information Center. Signage on trail indicates the locations of the campsites. Composting toilets have been installed, but no water is available on the mesa.

The trail splits on Horseshoe Mesa near the Last Chance Mine. A spur trail leads east down a break in the Redwall Limestone on the eastern side of the mesa close to the rim. The spur trail is steep, leading past Miners Spring which is the nearest water source for camping on Horseshoe Mesa. The end of this spur is about 4.5 miles (7.2 km) from the Grandview trail head at a junction with the Tonto Trail and leads to the head of Hance Canyon, a perennial water source and alternate camping area.

To the west of Last Chance Mine, a western spur from the Grandview Trail cuts through a break in the Redwall Limestone and descends the western side of the mesa following Cottonwood Creek. Water taken from this source must be filtered, treated, or boiled before consuming.

The Grandview Trail follows the west side of a small butte that caps the mesa. It leads to the northern end of the mesa, and then descends between the two arms of the mesa to a junction with the Tonto Trail. From this point, the east branch doubles back toward Hance Canyon, and the west branch leads to Cottonwood Creek.

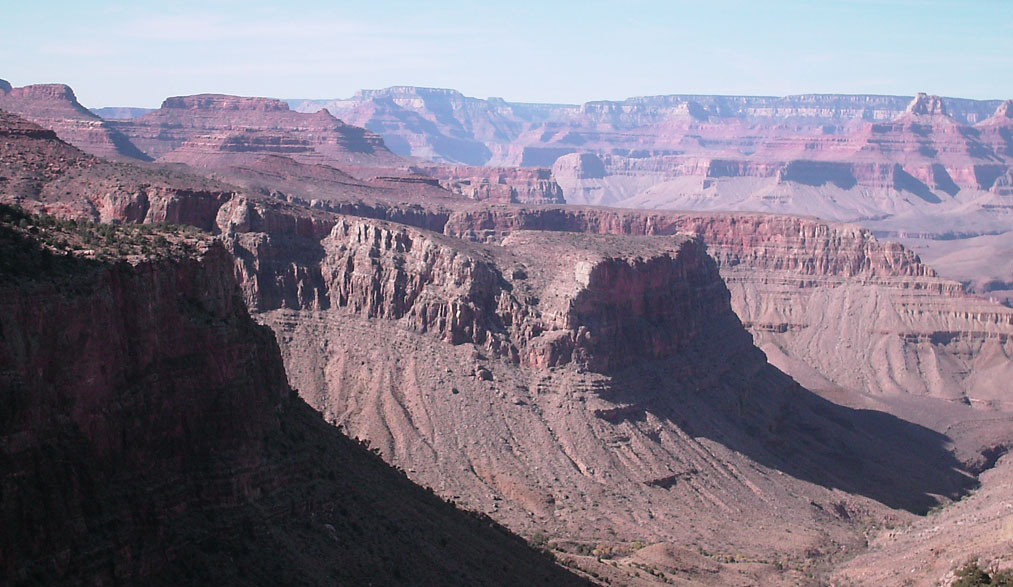
The Grandview-Phantom Monocline viewed facing northwest from the Grandview Trail south of Horseshoe Mesa.

== See also ==
- The Grand Canyon
- List of trails in Grand Canyon National Park
- Horseshoe Mesa
