= 1922 United States Senate elections =

- November 7, 1922
- Class 1

32 of the 96 seats in the United States Senate 49 seats needed for a majority
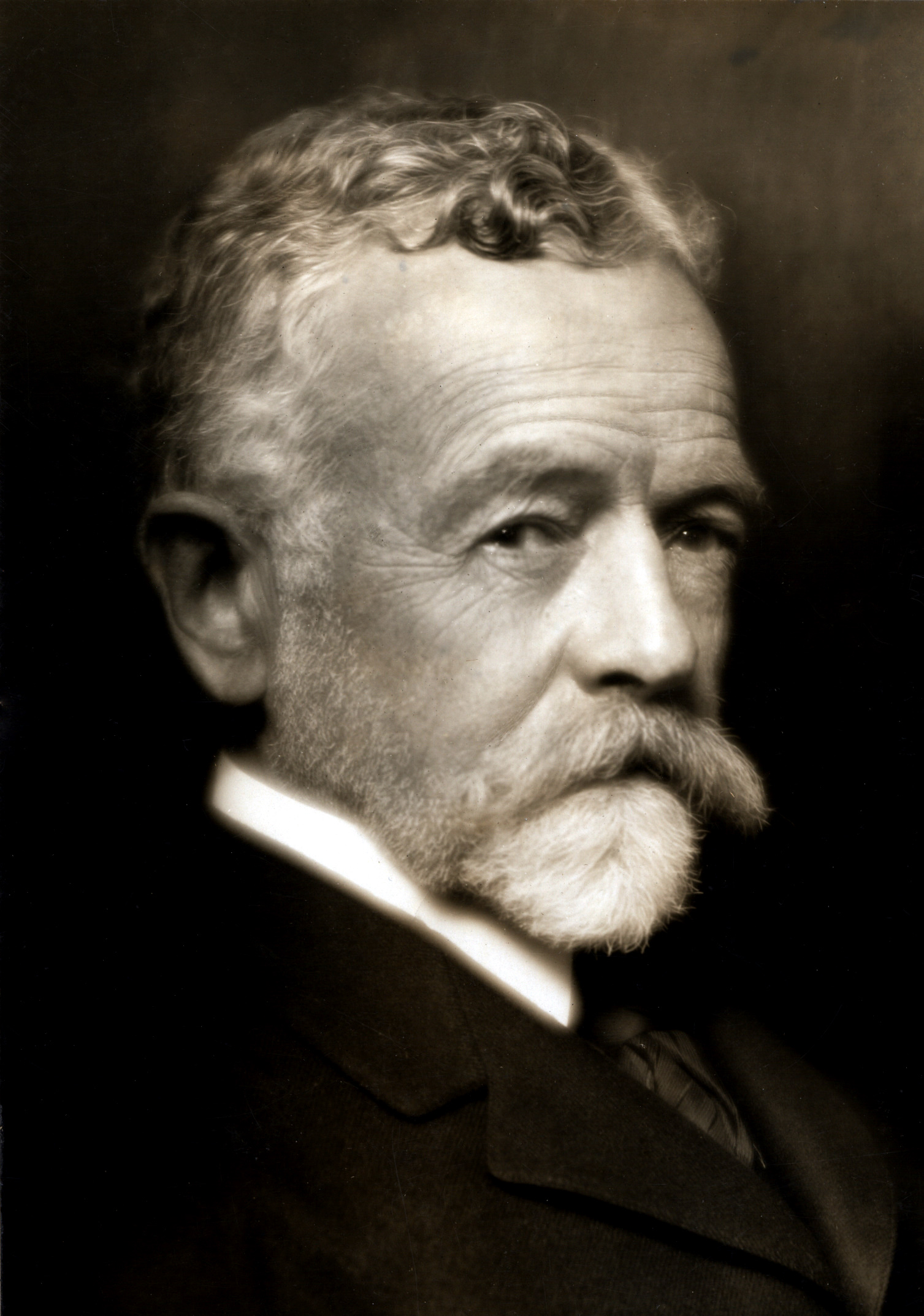

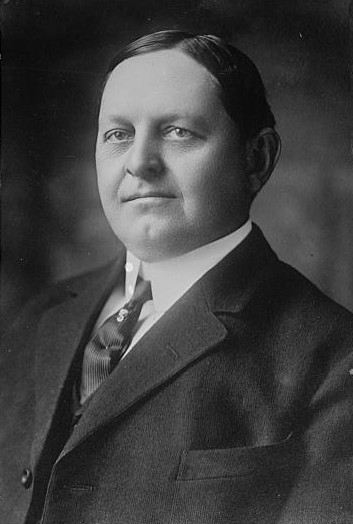
	Majority party	Minority party
Leader	Henry Cabot Lodge (Note: as Republican Conference Chairman and unofficial majority leader)	Oscar Underwood
Party	Republican	Democratic
Leader since	March 4, 1919	April 27, 1920
Leader's seat	Massachusetts	Alabama
Seats before	60	36
Seats after	53	42
Seat change	▼7	▲6
Seats up	17	15
Races won	10	21
	Third party
Party	Farmer–Labor
Seats before	0
Seats after	1
Seat change	▲1
Seats up	Steady
Races won	1
- Results of the elections: Democratic gain Democratic hold Republican gain Republican hold Farmer–Labor gain No election
Majority Leader before election
Henry Cabot Lodge
Republican
Elected Majority Leader
Henry Cabot Lodge
Republican

The 1922 United States Senate elections were elections that occurred in the middle of Republican President Warren G. Harding's term. The 32 seats of Class 1 were contested in regular elections, and special elections were held to fill vacancies. With the Republicans divided between conservative and progressive factions, the Democrats gained six net seats from the Republicans while the Farmer–Labor party gained one. The Republicans retained their Senate majority.

Mid-term vacancies would reduce the Republican majority by a further two seats, with the Democrats and the Farmer Labors picking up another seat each, reducing Republicans to a 51-43-2 majority.

== Gains, losses, and holds ==
=== Retirements ===
One Republican and two Democrats retired instead of seeking re-election. One Republican retired instead of seeking election to finish the unexpired term and one Democrat retired instead of seeking election to finish the unexpired term.

State	Senator	Replaced by
Georgia	Rebecca Latimer Felton	Walter F. George
Iowa	Charles A. Rawson	Smith W. Brookhart
Mississippi	John S. Williams	Hubert D. Stephens
Montana	Henry L. Myers	Burton K. Wheeler
Vermont	Carroll S. Page	Frank L. Greene

=== Defeats ===
Nine Republicans and three Democrats sought re-election but lost in the primary or general election. One Republican sought election to finish the unexpired term and sought election to a full term but lost in both the special election and the regular election.

State	Senator	Replaced by
Delaware	T. Coleman du Pont	Thomas F. Bayard Jr.
Indiana	Harry S. New	Samuel M. Ralston
Maryland	Joseph I. France	William Cabell Bruce
Michigan	Charles E. Townsend	Woodbridge N. Ferris
Minnesota	Frank B. Kellogg	Henrik Shipstead
Nebraska	Gilbert Hitchcock	Robert B. Howell
New Jersey	Joseph S. Frelinghuysen	Edward I. Edwards
New York	William M. Calder	Royal S. Copeland
North Dakota	Porter J. McCumber	Lynn Frazier
Ohio	Atlee Pomerene	Simeon D. Fess
Texas	Charles A. Culberson	Earle B. Mayfield
Washington	Miles Poindexter	Clarence Dill
West Virginia	Howard Sutherland	Matthew M. Neely

=== Post-elections changes ===
State	Senator	Replaced by
Colorado	Samuel D. Nicholson	Alva B. Adams
Illinois	Medill McCormick	Charles S. Deneen
Minnesota	Knute Nelson	Magnus Johnson

== Change in composition ==
=== Before the elections ===
At the beginning of 1922.

		D_{1}	D_{2}	D_{3}	D_{4}	D_{5}	D_{6}	D_{7}	D_{8}
D_{18}	D_{17}	D_{16}	D_{15}	D_{14}	D_{13}	D_{12}	D_{11}	D_{10}	D_{9}
D_{19}	D_{20}	D_{21} Ariz. Ran	D_{22} Fla. Ran	D_{23} Ga. (sp); Retired	D_{24} Miss. Retired	D_{25} Mo. Ran	D_{26} Mont. Retired	D_{27} Neb. Ran	D_{28} Nev. Ran
R_{59} W.Va. Ran	R_{60} Wis. Ran	D_{36} Wyo. Ran	D_{35} Va. Ran	D_{34} Utah; Ran	D_{33} Texas; Ran	D_{32} Tenn. Ran	D_{31} R.I. Ran	D_{30} Ohio; Ran	D_{29} N.M. Ran
R_{58} Wash. Ran	R_{57} Vt. Retired	R_{56} Pa. (sp cl.3); Ran	R_{55} Pa. (reg); Pa. (sp cl.1); Ran	R_{54} N.D. Ran	R_{53} N.Y. Ran	R_{52} N.J. Ran	R_{51} Minn. Ran	R_{50} Mich. Ran	R_{49} Mass. Ran
Majority →									R_{49} Mass. Ran
R_{39}	R_{40}	R_{41}	R_{42} Calif. Ran	R_{43} Conn. Ran	R_{44} Del. (reg); Del. (sp); Ran	R_{45} Ind. Ran	R_{46} Iowa (sp); Retired	R_{47} Maine; Ran	R_{48} Md. Ran
R_{38}	R_{37}	R_{36}	R_{35}	R_{34}	R_{33}	R_{32}	R_{31}	R_{30}	R_{29}
R_{19}	R_{20}	R_{21}	R_{22}	R_{23}	R_{24}	R_{25}	R_{26}	R_{27}	R_{28}
R_{18}	R_{17}	R_{16}	R_{15}	R_{14}	R_{13}	R_{12}	R_{11}	R_{10}	R_{9}
		R_{1}	R_{2}	R_{3}	R_{4}	R_{5}	R_{6}	R_{7}	R_{8}

=== After the elections ===
		D_{1}	D_{2}	D_{3}	D_{4}	D_{5}	D_{6}	D_{7}	D_{8}
D_{18}	D_{17}	D_{16}	D_{15}	D_{14}	D_{13}	D_{12}	D_{11}	D_{10}	D_{9}
D_{19}	D_{20}	D_{21} Ariz. Re-elected	D_{22} Del. (sp); Del. (reg); Gain (Note: Appointee defeated)	D_{23} Fla. Re-elected	D_{24} Ga. (sp); Hold	D_{25} Ind. Gain	D_{26} Md. Gain	D_{27} Mich. Gain	D_{28} Miss. Hold
D_{38} Utah; Re-elected	D_{37} Texas; Hold	D_{36} Tenn. Re-elected	D_{35} R.I. Re-elected	D_{34} N.Y. Re-elected	D_{33} N.M. Re-elected	D_{32} N.J. Gain	D_{31} Nev. Hold	D_{30} Mont. Hold	D_{29} Mo. Re-elected
D_{39} Va. Re-elected	D_{40} Wash. Gain	D_{41} W.Va. Gain	D_{42} Wyo. Re-elected	FL_{1} Minn. Gain	R_{53} Wis. Re-elected	R_{52} Vt. Hold	R_{51} Ohio; Gain	R_{50} Pa. (sp cl.3); Elected (Note: Appointee elected)	R_{49} Pa. (sp cl.1); Pa. (reg); Elected
Majority →									R_{49} Pa. (sp cl.1); Pa. (reg); Elected
R_{39}	R_{40}	R_{41}	R_{42} Calif. Re-elected	R_{43} Conn. Re-elected	R_{44} Iowa (sp); Hold	R_{45} Maine; Re-elected	R_{46} Mass. Re-elected	R_{47} Neb. Gain	R_{48} N.D. Hold
R_{38}	R_{37}	R_{36}	R_{35}	R_{34}	R_{33}	R_{32}	R_{31}	R_{30}	R_{29}
R_{19}	R_{20}	R_{21}	R_{22}	R_{23}	R_{24}	R_{25}	R_{26}	R_{27}	R_{28}
R_{18}	R_{17}	R_{16}	R_{15}	R_{14}	R_{13}	R_{12}	R_{11}	R_{10}	R_{9}
		R_{1}	R_{2}	R_{3}	R_{4}	R_{5}	R_{6}	R_{7}	R_{8}

Key

D_{#}	Democratic
FL_{#}	Farmer–Labor
R_{#}	Republican

== Race summaries ==
=== Special elections during the 67th Congress ===
In these special elections, the winners were seated during 1922; ordered by election date.

State	Incumbent			Results	Candidates
State	Senator	Party	Electoral history	Results	Candidates
Delaware (Class 1)	T. Coleman du Pont	Republican	1921 (appointed)	Interim appointee lost election. New senator elected November 7, 1922. Democratic gain. Winner also elected to the next term; see below.	▌ ✓ Thomas F. Bayard Jr. (Democratic) 49.7%; ▌T. Coleman du Pont (Republican) 49.6%
Georgia (Class 3)	Rebecca Latimer Felton	Democratic	1922 (appointed)	Interim appointee retired. New senator elected November 7, 1922. Democratic hold.	▌ ✓ Walter F. George (Democratic); unopposed
Iowa (Class 2)	Charles A. Rawson	Republican	1922 (appointed)	Interim appointee retired. New senator elected November 7, 1922. Republican hold.	▌ ✓ Smith W. Brookhart (Republican) 63.1%; ▌Clyde L. Herring (Democratic) 36.9%
Pennsylvania (Class 1)	David A. Reed	Republican	1922 (appointed)	Interim appointee elected November 7, 1922. Winner also elected to the next term; see below.	▌ ✓ David A. Reed (Republican) 86.1%; ▌Rachel C. Robinson (Prohibition) 6.0%; ▌William J. VanEssen (Socialist) 5.6%
Pennsylvania (Class 3)	George W. Pepper	Republican	1922 (appointed)	Interim appointee elected November 7, 1922.	▌ ✓ George W. Pepper (Republican) 57.6%; ▌Fred B. Kerr (Democratic) 32.9%

=== Elections leading to the 68th Congress ===
In these general elections, the winners were elected for the term beginning March 4, 1923; ordered by state.

All of the elections involved the Class 1 seats.

State	Incumbent			Results	Candidates
State	Senator	Party	Electoral history	Results	Candidates
Arizona	Henry F. Ashurst	Democratic	1912 (new state); 1916	Incumbent re-elected.	▌ ✓ Henry F. Ashurst (Democratic) 65.0%; ▌James H. McClintock (Republican) 35.0%
California	Hiram Johnson	Republican	1916	Incumbent re-elected.	▌ ✓ Hiram Johnson (Republican) 62.2%; ▌William J. Pearson (Democratic) 23.8%; ▌H. Clay Needham (Prohibition) 7.8%; ▌Upton Sinclair (Socialist) 6.3%
Connecticut	George P. McLean	Republican	1911; 1916	Incumbent re-elected.	▌ ✓ George P. McLean (Republican) 52.3%; ▌Thomas J. Spellacy (Democratic) 45.5%; ▌Isadore Polsky (Socialist) 1.9%
Delaware	T. Coleman du Pont	Republican	1921 (appointed)	Interim appointee lost election. Democratic gain.	▌ ✓ Thomas F. Bayard Jr. (Democratic) 49.8%; ▌T. Coleman du Pont (Republican) 49.4%; ▌Frank Stephens (Forward) 0.8%
Florida	Park Trammell	Democratic	1916	Incumbent re-elected.	▌ ✓ Park Trammell (Democratic) 88.0%; ▌W. C. Lawson (Ind. Republican) 11.7%
Indiana	Harry S. New	Republican	1916	Incumbent lost renomination. Democratic gain.	▌ ✓ Samuel M. Ralston (Democratic) 50.9%; ▌Albert J. Beveridge (Republican) 47.8%
Maine	Frederick Hale	Republican	1916	Incumbent re-elected September 11, 1922.	▌ ✓ Frederick Hale (Republican) 57.5%; ▌Oakley C. Curtis (Democratic) 42.5%
Maryland	Joseph I. France	Republican	1916	Incumbent lost re-election. Democratic gain.	▌ ✓ William Cabell Bruce (Democratic) 52.6%; ▌Joseph I. France (Republican) 45.6%; Others: ▌Robert E. Long (Labor) 1.0%; ▌James L. Smiley (Socialist) 0.8%
Massachusetts	Henry Cabot Lodge	Republican	1893; 1899; 1905; 1911; 1916	Incumbent re-elected.	▌ ✓ Henry Cabot Lodge (Republican) 47.6%; ▌William A. Gaston (Democratic) 46.8%; ▌John A. Nichols (Prohibition) 2.9%; Others: ▌John Weaver Sherman (Socialist) 1.3%; ▌Washington Cook (Independent) 0.9%; ▌William E. Weeks (Progressive) 0.6%
Michigan	Charles E. Townsend	Republican	1911; 1916	Incumbent lost re-election. Democratic gain.	▌ ✓ Woodbridge N. Ferris (Democratic) 50.6%; ▌Charles E. Townsend (Republican) 48.4%; Others: ▌William L. Kreighoff (Socialist) 0.7%; ▌Frank E. Titus (Prohibition) 0.3%
Minnesota	Frank B. Kellogg	Republican	1916	Incumbent lost re-election. Farmer–Labor gain.	▌ ✓ Henrik Shipstead (Farmer–Labor) 47.1%; ▌Frank B. Kellogg (Republican) 35.0%; ▌Anna D. Olesen (Democratic) 17.9%
Mississippi	John S. Williams	Democratic	1908 (early); 1916	Incumbent retired. Democratic hold.	▌ ✓ Hubert D. Stephens (Democratic) 92.8%; ▌John C. Cook (Republican) 5.3%; ▌Sumner W. Rose (Socialist) 1.9%
Missouri	James A. Reed	Democratic	1911; 1916	Incumbent re-elected.	▌ ✓ James A. Reed (Democratic) 51.9%; ▌R. R. Brewster (Republican) 47.3%; Others: ▌W. M. Brandt (Socialist) 0.7%; ▌William Wesley Cox (Socialist Labor) 0.1%
Montana	Henry L. Myers	Democratic	1911; 1916	Incumbent retired. Democratic hold.	▌ ✓ Burton K. Wheeler (Democratic) 55.4%; ▌Carl W. Riddick (Republican) 43.6%; ▌George H. Ambrose (Socialist) 0.7%
Nebraska	Gilbert Hitchcock	Democratic	1911; 1916	Incumbent lost re-election. Republican gain.	▌ ✓ Robert B. Howell (Republican) 56.8%; ▌Gilbert Hitchcock (Democratic) 38.2%; ▌James L. Beebe (Progressive) 4.9%
Nevada	Key Pittman	Democratic	1913 (special); 1916	Incumbent re-elected.	▌ ✓ Key Pittman (Democratic) 62.8%; ▌Charles S. Chandler (Republican) 37.2%
New Jersey	Joseph S. Frelinghuysen	Republican	1916	Incumbent lost re-election. Democratic gain.	▌ ✓ Edward I. Edwards (Democratic) 54.9%; ▌Joseph S. Frelinghuysen (Republican) 44.1%
New Mexico	Andrieus A. Jones	Democratic	1916	Incumbent re-elected.	▌ ✓ Andrieus A. Jones (Democratic) 55.2%; ▌S. B. Davis Jr. (Republican) 44.1%
New York	William M. Calder	Republican	1916	Incumbent lost re-election. Democratic gain.	▌ ✓ Royal S. Copeland (Democratic) 52.6%; ▌William M. Calder (Republican) 41.0%; ▌Algernon Lee (Socialist) 4.9%; Others: ▌Coleridge A. Hart (Prohibition) 1.3%; ▌Henry Kuhn (Socialist Labor) 0.2%
North Dakota	Porter J. McCumber	Republican	1899; 1905; 1911; 1916	Incumbent lost renomination. Republican hold.	▌ ✓ Lynn Frazier (Republican) 52.3%; ▌J. F. T. O'Connor (Democratic) 47.7%
Ohio	Atlee Pomerene	Democratic	1911; 1916	Incumbent lost re-election. Republican gain.	▌ ✓ Simeon D. Fess (Republican) 50.9%; ▌Atlee Pomerene (Democratic) 47.7%; ▌Virginia D. Green (Independent) 1.4%
Pennsylvania	David A. Reed	Republican	1922 (appointed)	Interim appointee elected. Winner was also elected to finish the current term; see above.	▌ ✓ David A. Reed (Republican) 55.6%; ▌Samuel L. Schull (Democratic) 30.1%; ▌William J. Burke (Progressive) 8.8%; ▌Rachel C. Robinson (Prohibition) 2.9%; Others: ▌Charles Sehl (Socialist) 2.3%; ▌Charles J. Schoales (Single Tax) 0.3%
Rhode Island	Peter G. Gerry	Democratic	1916	Incumbent re-elected.	▌ ✓ Peter G. Gerry (Democratic) 52.2%; ▌R. Livingston Beeckman (Republican) 43.4%; ▌James Matthews (Socialist Labor) 3.8%; ▌James I. Bartholomew (Law and Order) 0.6%
Tennessee	Kenneth McKellar	Democratic	1916	Incumbent re-elected.	▌ ✓ Kenneth McKellar (Democratic) 68.0%; ▌Newell Sanders (Republican) 32.0%
Texas	Charles A. Culberson	Democratic	1899; 1905; 1911; 1916	Incumbent lost renomination. Democratic hold.	▌ ✓ Earle B. Mayfield (Democratic) 66.6%; ▌George Peddy (Ind. Democratic) 33.4%
Utah	William H. King	Democratic	1916	Incumbent re-elected.	▌ ✓ William H. King (Democratic) 48.6%; ▌Ernest Bamberger (Republican) 48.2%; ▌Charles T. Stoney (Socialist) 3.2%
Vermont	Carroll S. Page	Republican	1908 (special); 1910; 1916	Incumbent retired. Republican hold.	▌ ✓ Frank L. Greene (Republican) 67.9%; ▌William B. Mayo (Democratic) 32.1%
Virginia	Claude A. Swanson	Democratic	1910 (appointed); 1911 (appointed); 1912 (special); 1916	Incumbent re-elected.	▌ ✓ Claude A. Swanson (Democratic) 71.9%; ▌J. W. McGavock (Republican) 26.5%; ▌Matt N. Lewis (Independent) 1.62%
Washington	Miles Poindexter	Republican	1910; 1916	Incumbent lost re-election. Democratic gain.	▌ ✓ Clarence Dill (Democratic) 44.2%; ▌Miles Poindexter (Republican) 43.0%; ▌James A. Duncan (Farmer–Labor) 12.0%; Others: ▌David Burgess (Socialist Labor) 0.7%; ▌Frans Bostrom (Workers) 0.2%
West Virginia	Howard Sutherland	Republican	1916	Incumbent lost re-election. Democratic gain.	▌ ✓ Matthew M. Neely (Democratic) 51.2%; ▌Howard Sutherland (Republican) 47.6%; ▌M. S. Holt (Socialist) 1.3%
Wisconsin	Robert M. La Follette	Republican	1905; 1911; 1916	Incumbent re-elected.	▌ ✓ Robert M. La Follette (Republican) 80.7%; ▌Jessie Jack Hooper (Democratic) 16.6%; Others: ▌Adolph R. Bucknam (Prohibition) 2.4%; ▌Richard Koeppel (Independent) 0.4%
Wyoming	John B. Kendrick	Democratic	1916	Incumbent re-elected.	▌ ✓ John B. Kendrick (Democratic) 56.7%; ▌Frank W. Mondell (Republican) 42.3%; ▌W. B. Guthrie (Socialist) 1.0%

== Closest races ==
Fourteen races had a margin of victory under 10%:

State	Party of winner	Margin
Delaware (special)	Democratic (flip)	0.1%
Delaware (regular)	Democratic (flip)	0.43%
Utah	Democratic	0.47%
Massachusetts	Republican	0.8%
Washington	Democratic (flip)	1.2%
Michigan	Democratic (flip)	2.2%
Indiana	Democratic (flip)	3.1%
Ohio	Republican (flip)	3.2%
West Virginia	Democratic (flip)	3.6%
North Dakota	Republican	4.56%
Missouri	Democratic	4.6%
Maryland	Democratic (flip)	7.0%
Connecticut	Republican	6.8%
Rhode Island	Democratic	8.8%

The tipping point state is Pennsylvania with a margin of 25.5%.

== Arizona ==
1922 United States Senate election in Arizona
- November 7, 1922
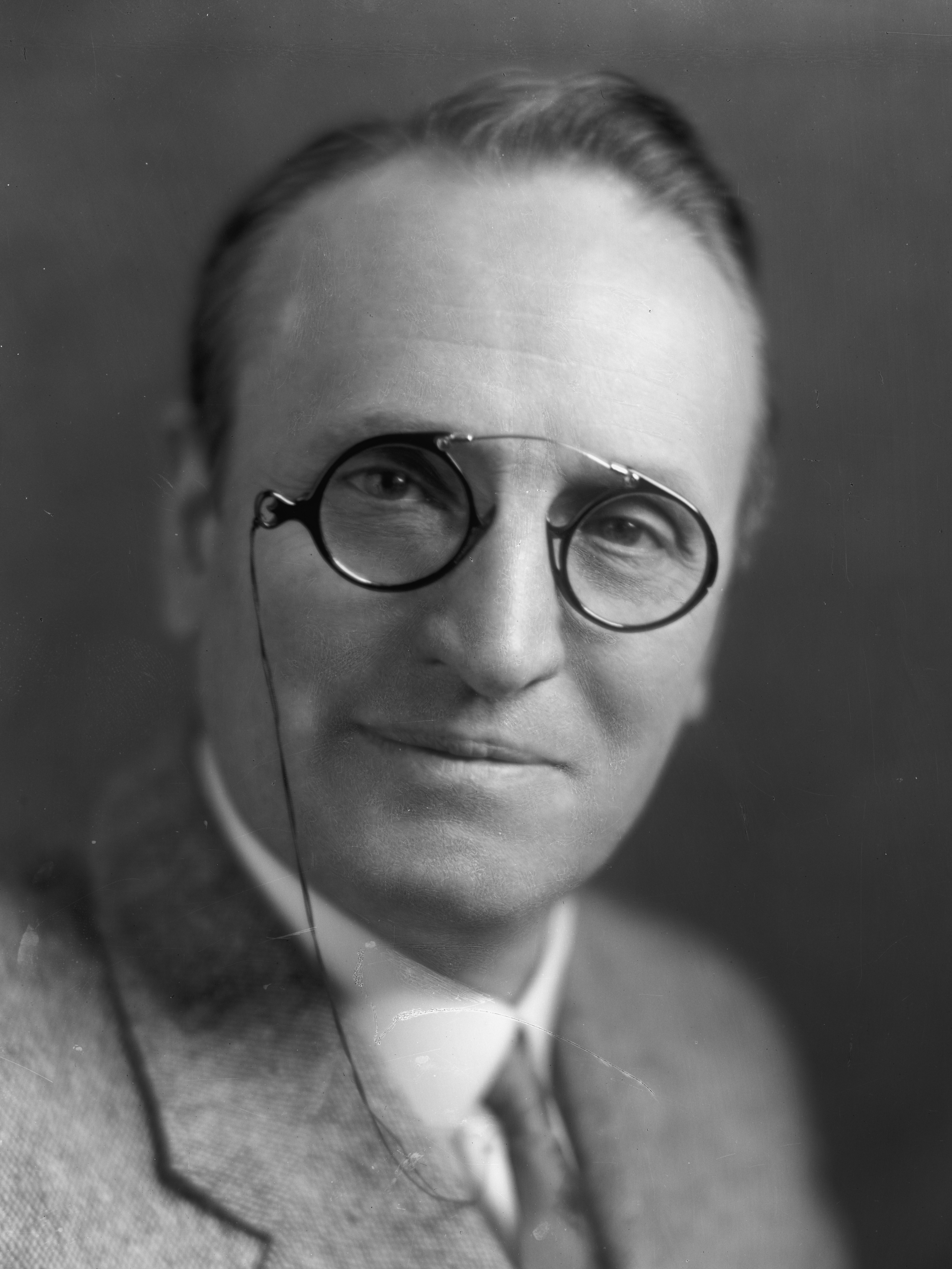

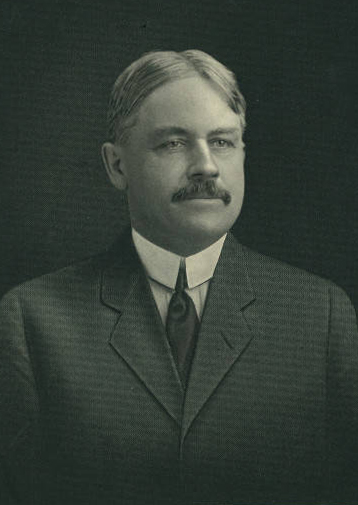
Nominee	Henry Fountain Ashurst	James Harvey McClintock
Party	Democratic	Republican
Popular vote	39,722	21,358
Percentage	65.03%	34.97%
- County results Ashurst: 50–60% 60–70% 70–80%
U.S. senator before election
Henry F. Ashurst
Democratic
Elected U.S. Senator
Henry F. Ashurst
Democratic

1922 United States Senate election in Arizona
Party	Candidate	Votes	%
Democratic	Henry F. Ashurst (Incumbent)	39,722	65.03%
Republican	James H. McClintock	21,358	34.97%
Majority		13,864	30.06%
Turnout		61,080	
Democratic hold			

== California ==
1922 United States Senate election in California
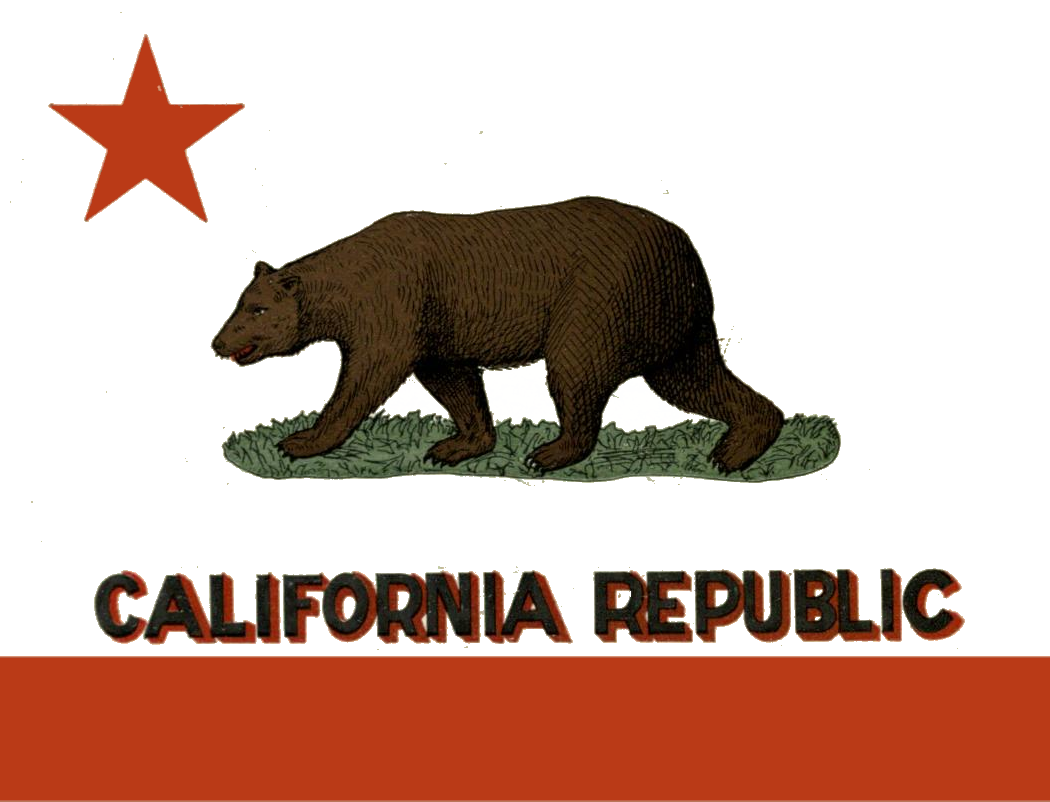
- November 7, 1922
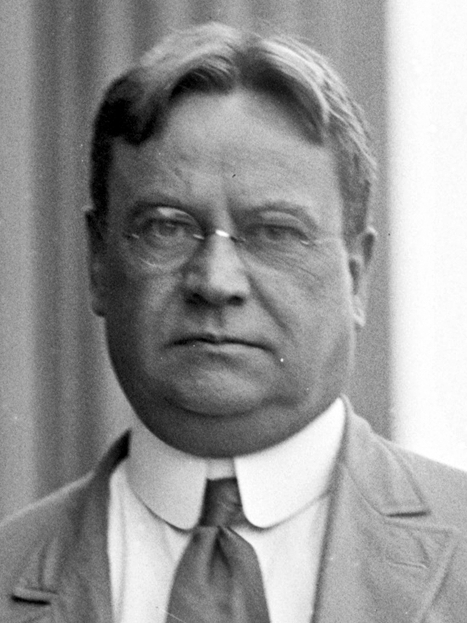

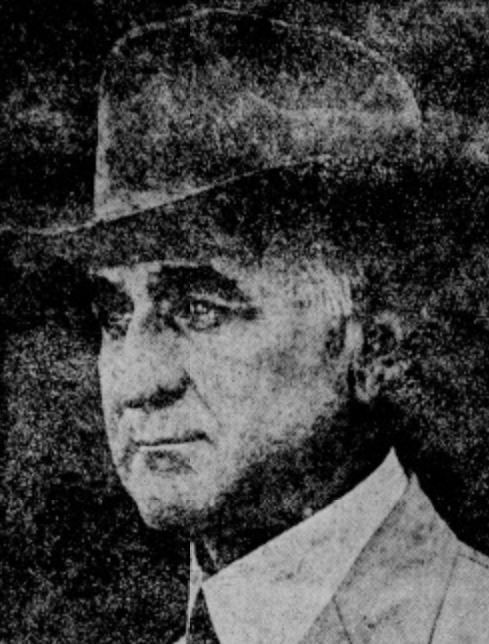

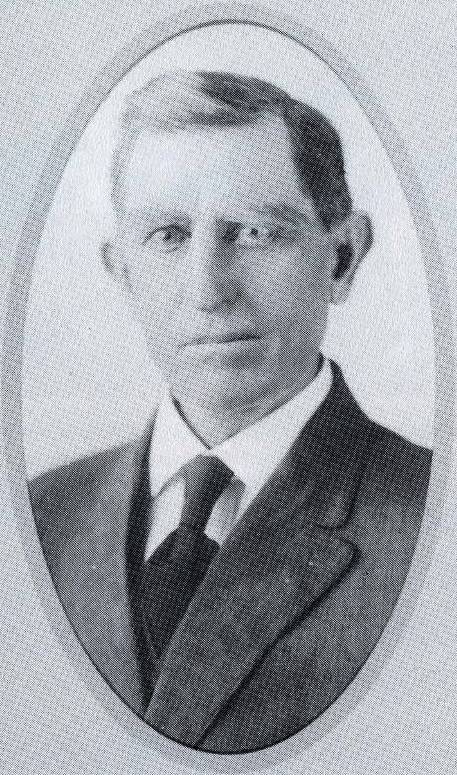

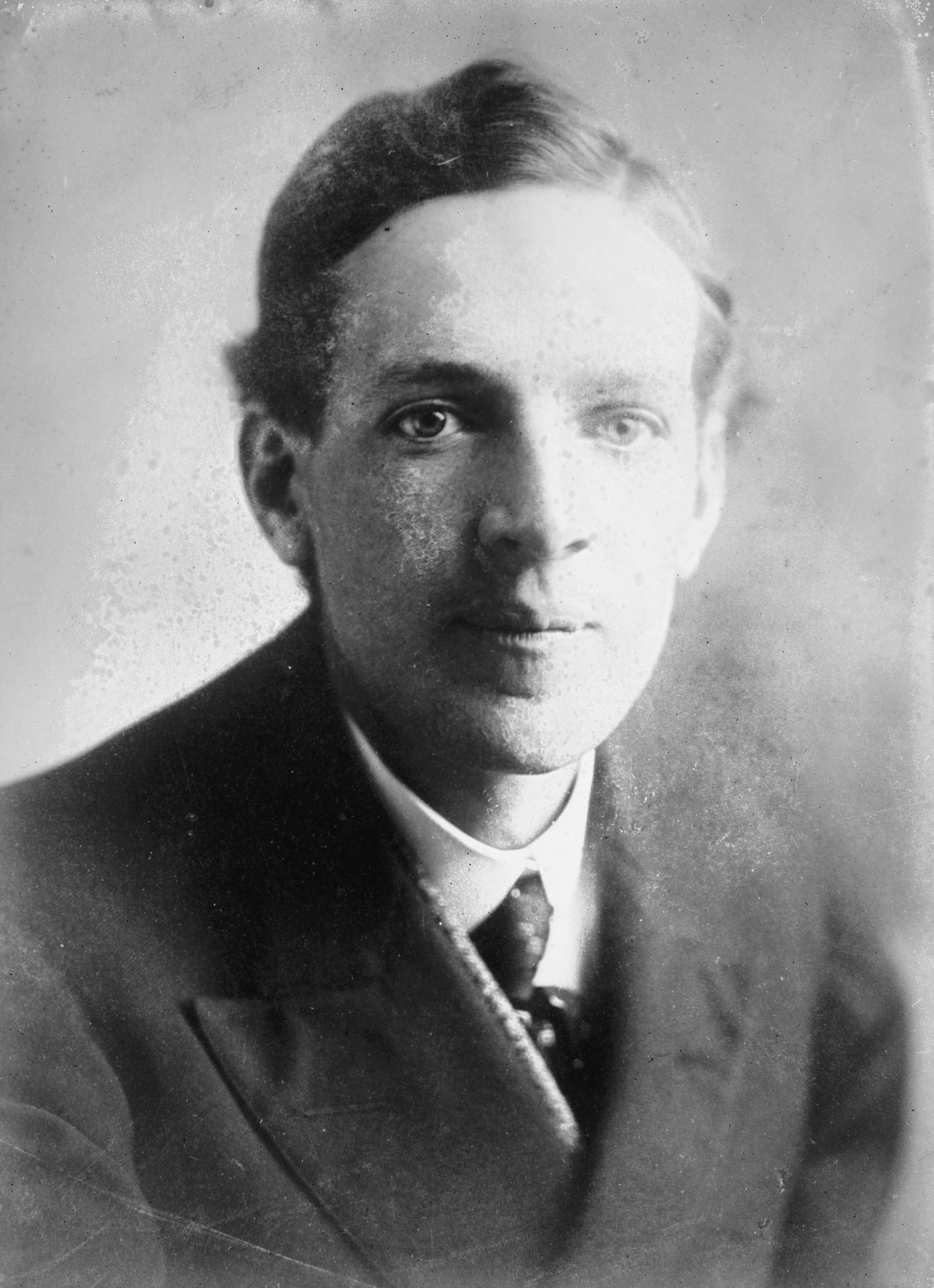
Nominee	Hiram Johnson	William J. Pearson
Party	Republican	Democratic
Popular vote	564,422	215,748
Percentage	62.17%	23.76%
Nominee	Henry Clay Needham	Upton Sinclair
Party	Prohibition	Socialist
Popular vote	70,748	56,982
Percentage	7.79%	6.28%
- County results Johnson: 40–50% 50–60% 60–70% 70–80% 80–90%
U.S. senator before election
Hiram Johnson
Republican
Elected U.S. Senator
Hiram Johnson
Republican

1922 United States Senate election in California
Party	Candidate	Votes	%
Republican	Hiram Johnson (Incumbent)	564,422	62.17%
Democratic	William J. Pearson	215,748	23.76%
Prohibition	H. Clay Needham	70,748	7.79%
Socialist	Upton Sinclair	56,982	6.28%
Majority		348,674	38.41%
Turnout		907,900	
Republican hold			

== Connecticut ==
1922 United States Senate election in Connecticut
- November 7, 1922
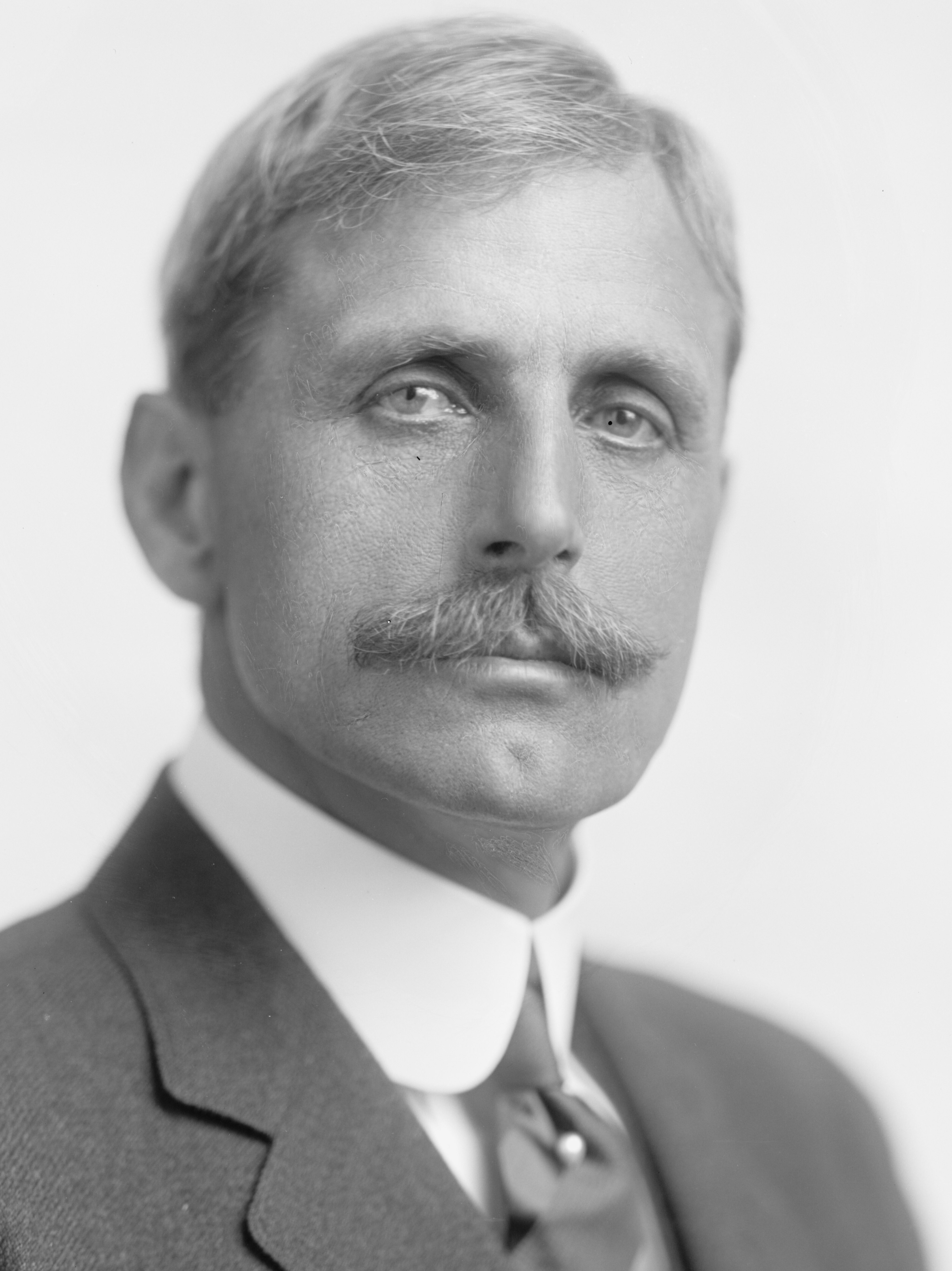

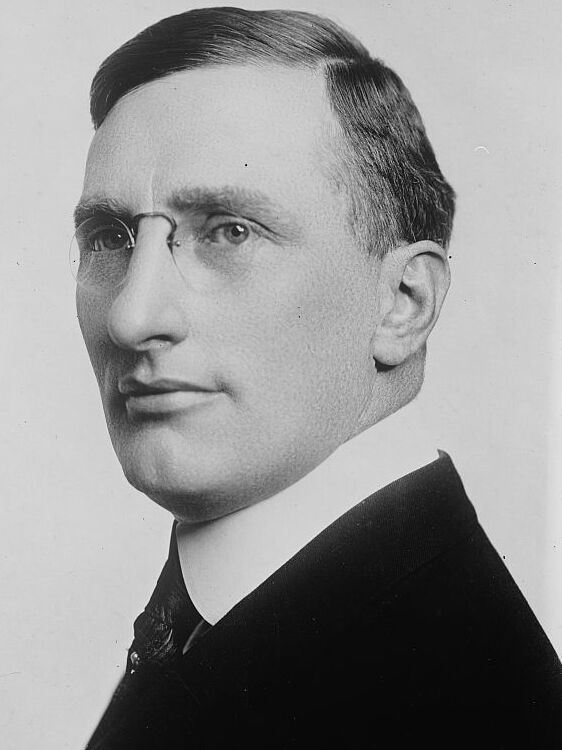
Nominee	George P. McLean	Thomas J. Spellacy
Party	Republican	Democratic
Popular vote	169,524	147,276
Percentage	52.34%	45.47%
- McLean: 40–50% 50–60% 60–70% 70–80% 80–90% 90–100% Spellacy: 40–50% 50–60% 60–70%
U.S. senator before election
George P. McLean
Republican
Elected U.S. Senator
George P. McLean
Republican

1922 United States Senate election in Connecticut
Party	Candidate	Votes	%
Republican	George P. McLean (Incumbent)	169,524	52.49%
Democratic	Thomas J. Spellacy	147,276	45.60%
Socialist	Isadore Polsky	6,161	1.91%
Majority		22,248	6.89%
Turnout		322,961	
Republican hold			

== Delaware ==
There were 2 elections in Delaware.

=== Delaware (special) ===
1922 United States Senate special election in Delaware
- November 7, 1922
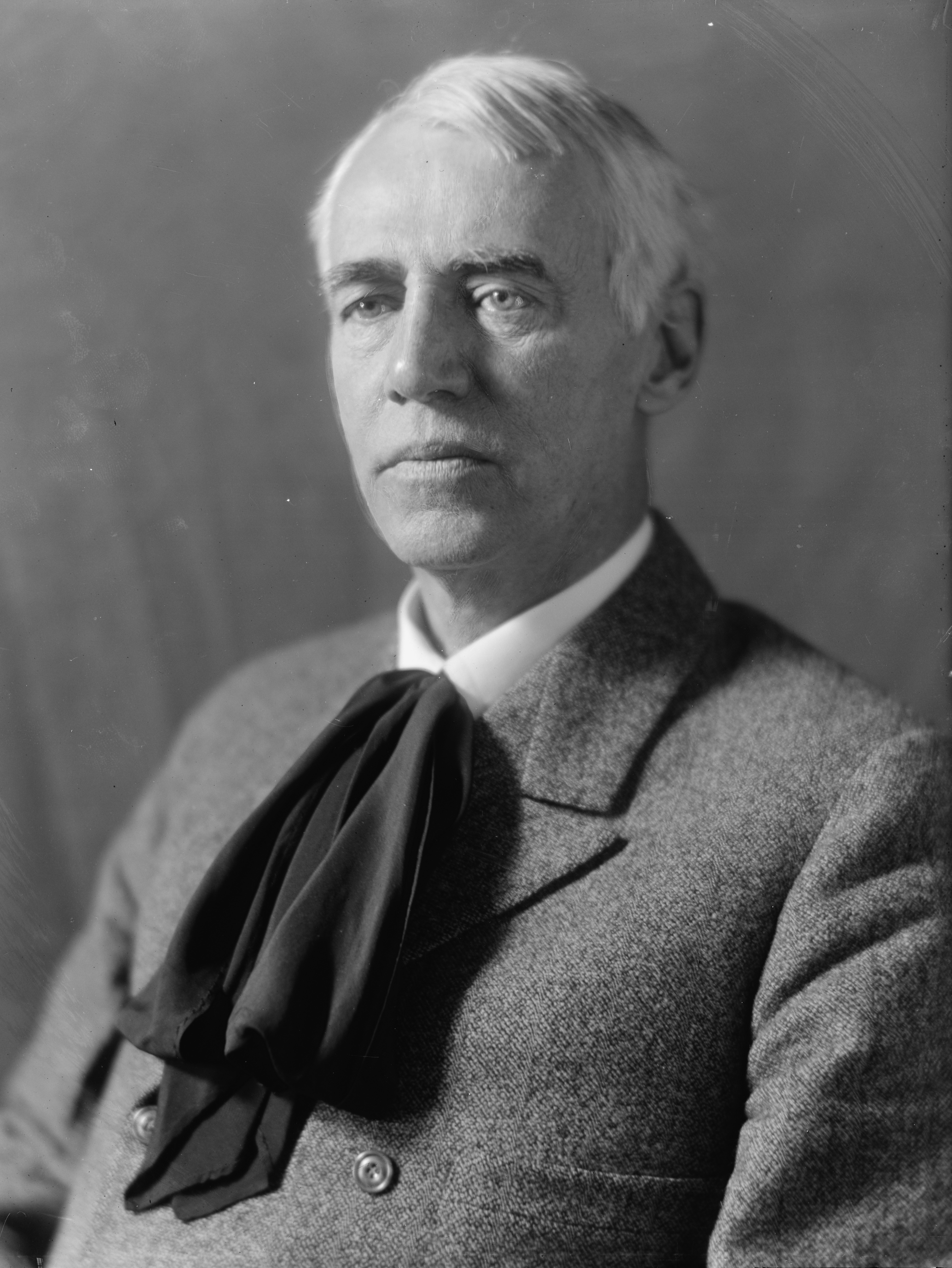

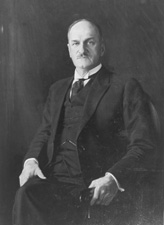
Nominee	Thomas F. Bayard Jr.	T. Coleman du Pont
Party	Democratic	Republican
Popular vote	36,954	36,894
Percentage	49.65%	49.57%
U.S. senator before election
T. Coleman du Pont
Republican
Elected U.S. Senator
Thomas F. Bayard Jr.
Democratic

1922 United States Senate special election in Delaware
Party	Candidate	Votes	%
Democratic	Thomas F. Bayard Jr.	36,954	49.65%
Republican	T. Coleman du Pont (Incumbent)	36,894	49.57%
Forward	Frank Stephens	581	0.78%
Majority		60	0.08%
Turnout		74,429	
Democratic gain from Republican			

=== Delaware (regular) ===
1922 United States Senate election in Delaware
- November 7, 1922
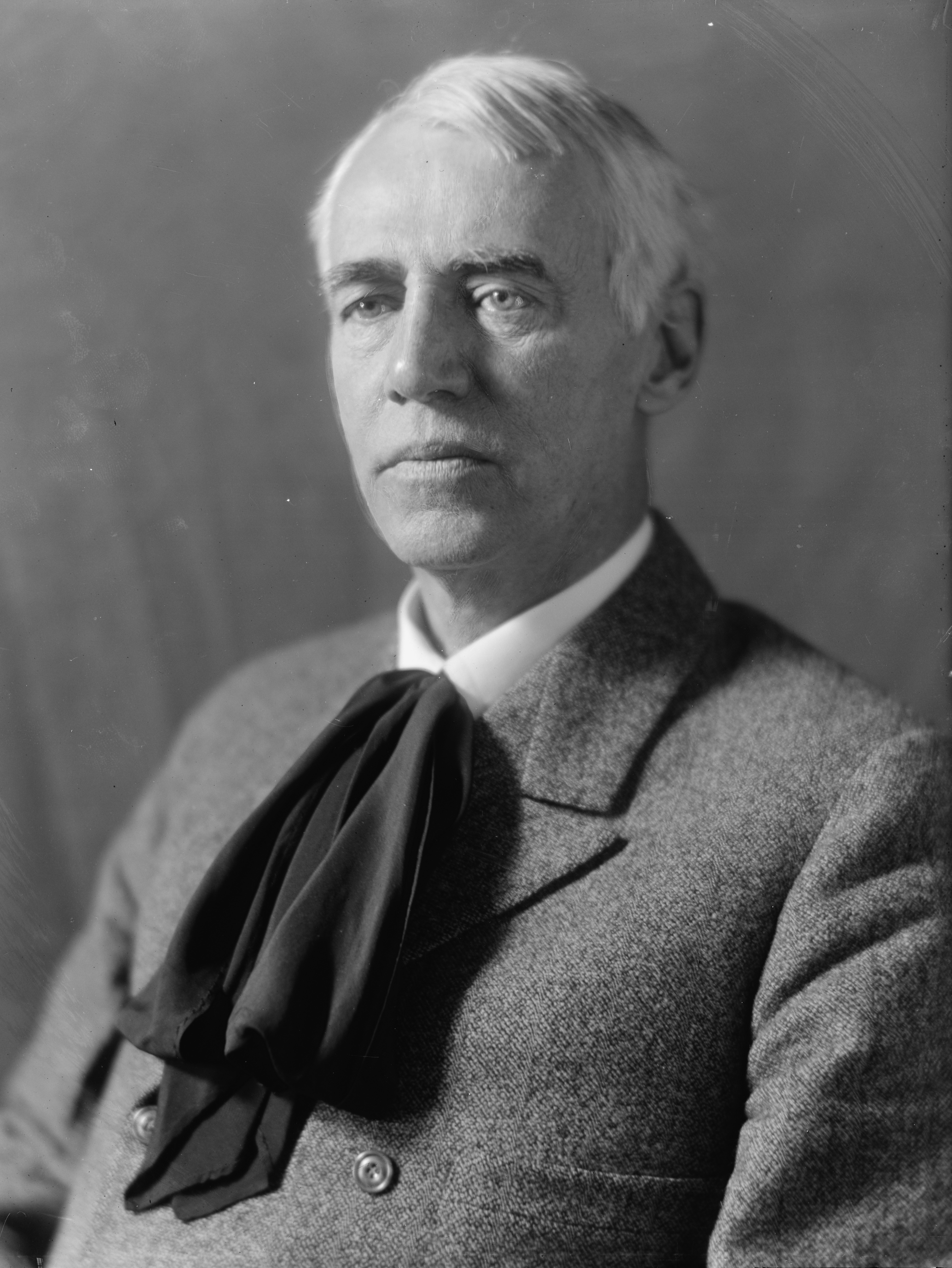

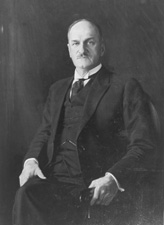
Nominee	Thomas F. Bayard Jr.	T. Coleman du Pont
Party	Democratic	Republican
Popular vote	37,304	36,979
Percentage	49.81%	49.38%
- County results Bayard: 50–60% Pont: 50–60%
U.S. senator before election
T. Coleman du Pont
Republican
Elected U.S. Senator
Thomas F. Bayard Jr.
Democratic

1922 United States Senate election in Delaware
Party	Candidate	Votes	%
Democratic	Thomas F. Bayard Jr.	37,304	49.81%
Republican	T. Coleman du Pont (Incumbent)	36,979	49.38%
Forward	Frank Stephens	608	0.81%
Majority		325	0.43%
Turnout		74,891	
Democratic gain from Republican			

== Florida ==
1922 United States Senate election in Florida
- November 7, 1922
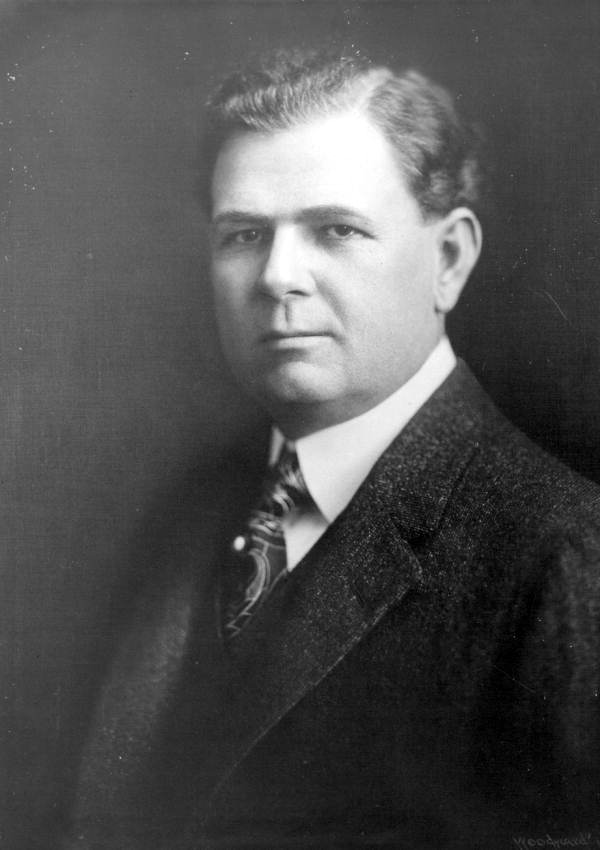

Nominee	Park Trammell	W. C. Lawson
Party	Democratic	Independent Republican
Popular vote	45,707	6,074
Percentage	88.27%	11.73%
- County results Trammell: 70–80% 80–90% >90%
U.S. senator before election
Park Trammell
Democratic
Elected U.S. Senator
Park Trammell
Democratic

1922 United States Senate election in Florida
Party	Candidate	Votes	%
Democratic	Park Trammell (Incumbent)	45,707	88.27%
Independent Republican	W. C. Lawson	6,074	11.73%
Majority		39,733	76.54%
Turnout		51,781	
Democratic hold			

== Georgia (special) ==
1922 United States Senate election in Georgia
- October 12, 1922
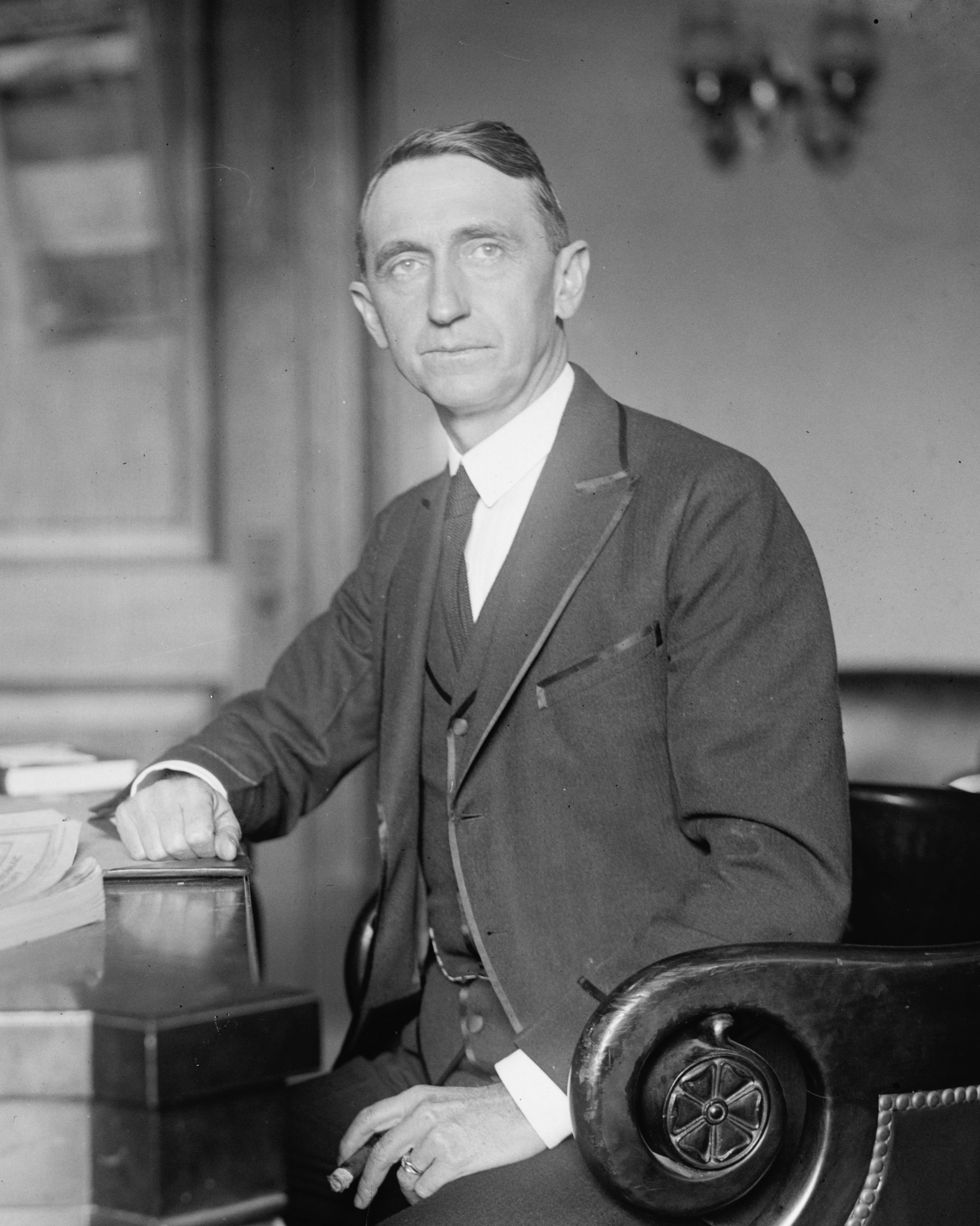

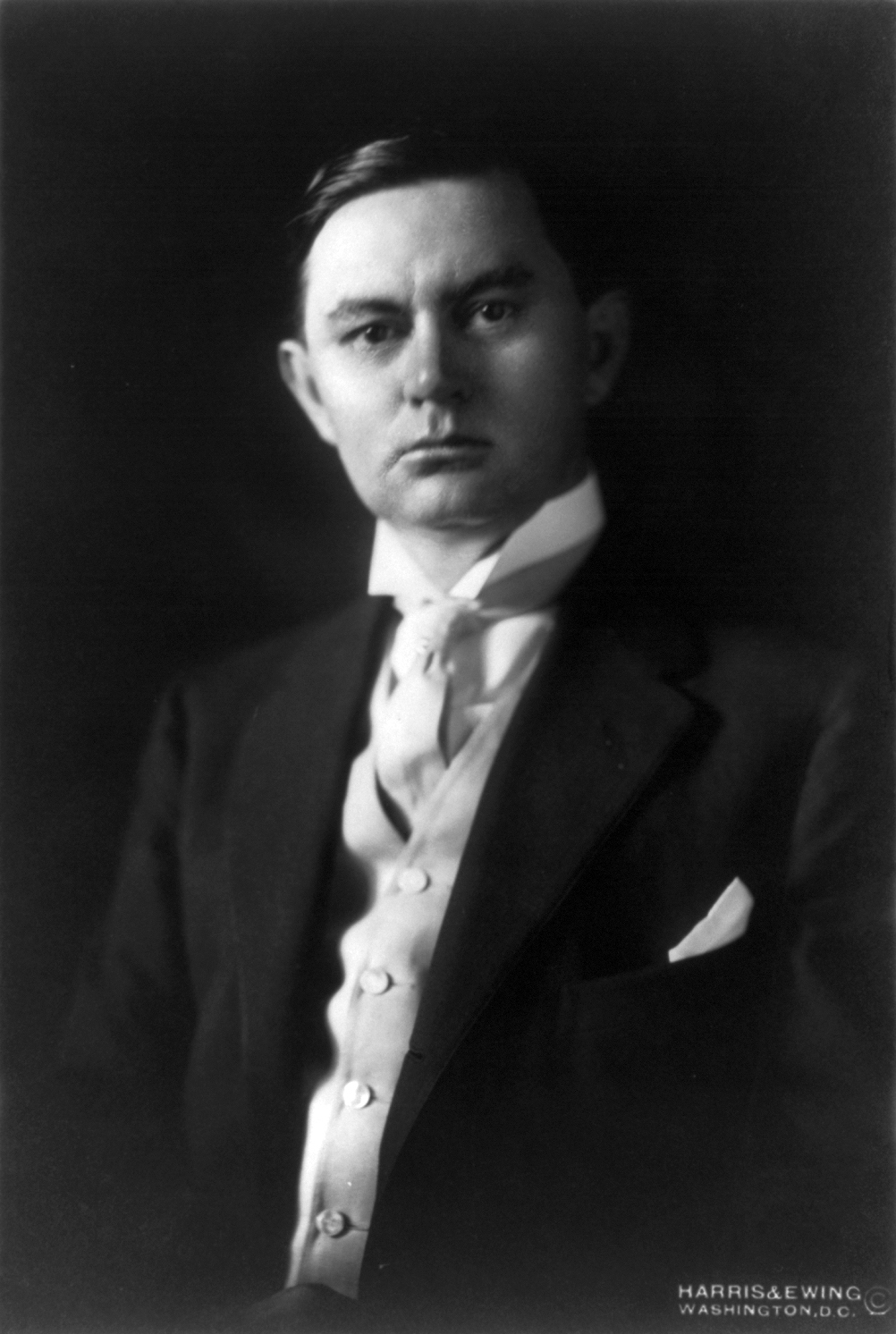

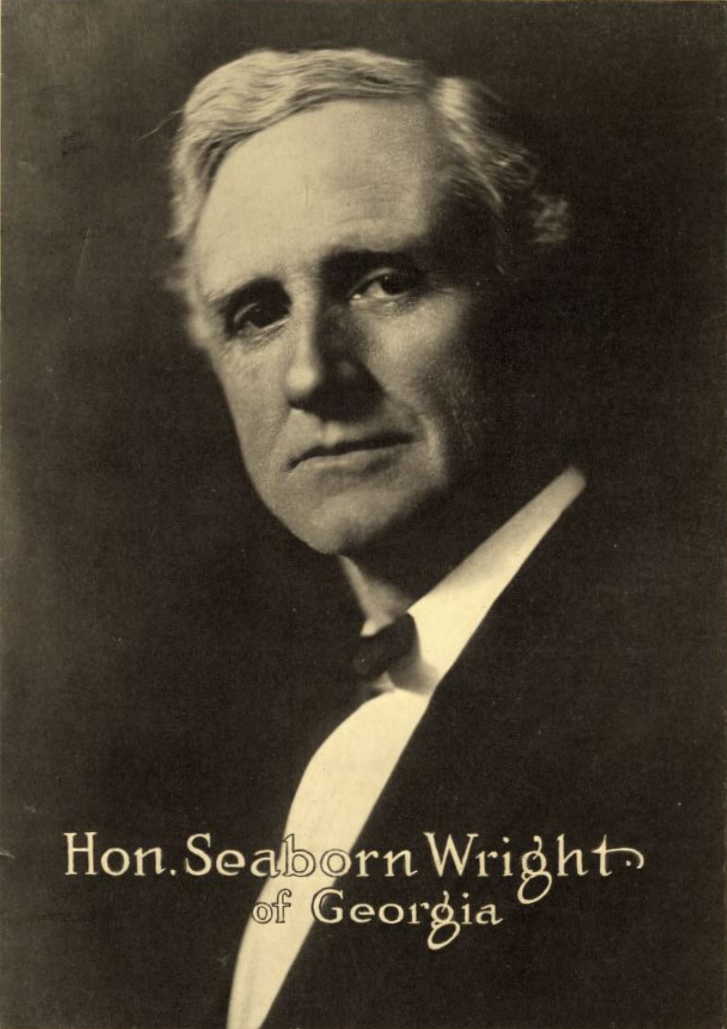
Nominee	Walter F. George	Thomas W. Hardwick	Seaborn Wright
Party	Democratic	Democratic	Democratic
Popular vote	60,436	36,328	12,820
Percentage	54.64%	32.85%	11.59%
U.S. senator before election
Rebecca Latimer Felton
Democratic
Elected U.S. Senator
Walter F. George
Democratic

1922 United States Senate special Democratic primary in Georgia
Party	Candidate	Votes	%
Democratic	Walter F. George	60,436	54.64%
Democratic	Thomas W. Hardwick	36,328	32.85%
Democratic	Seaborn Wright	12,820	11.59%
Democratic	John R. Cooper	1,018	0.92%
Majority		24,108	21.79%
Turnout		110,602	
Democratic hold			

In the special general election held November 7, 1922, George was unopposed.

== Indiana ==
1922 United States Senate election in Indiana
- November 7, 1922
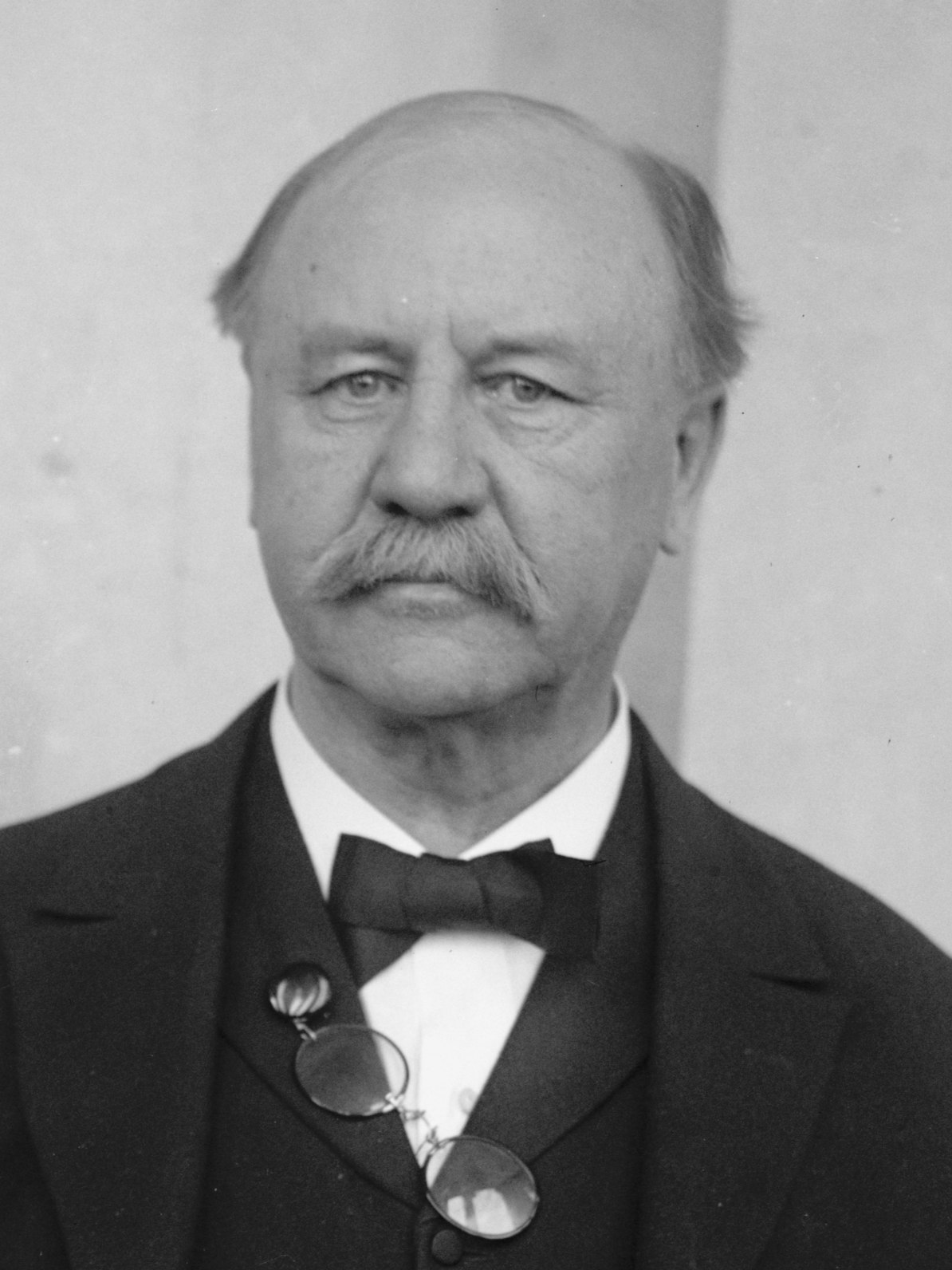

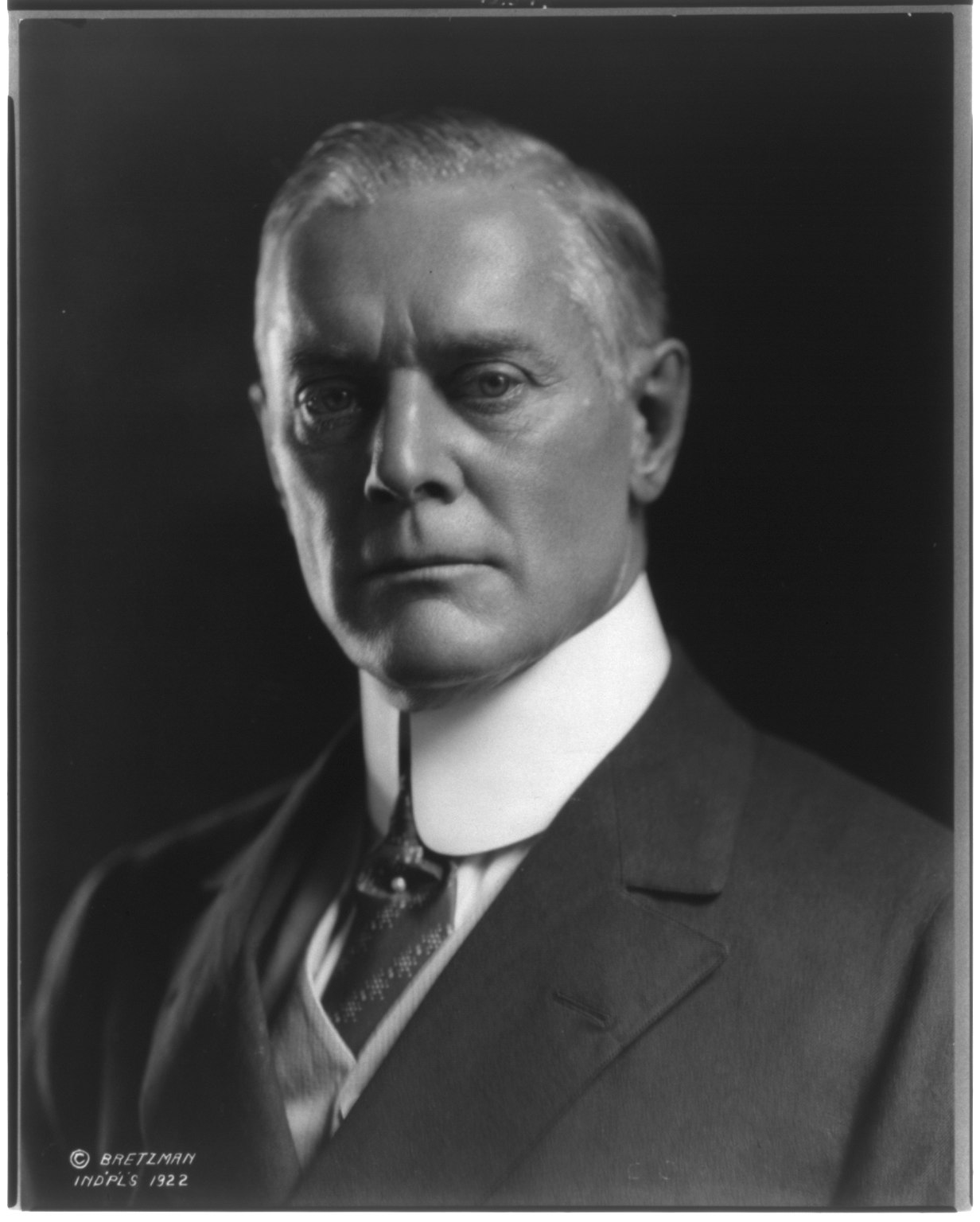
Nominee	Samuel Ralston	Albert Beveridge
Party	Democratic	Republican
Popular vote	558,169	524,558
Percentage	50.87%	47.80%
- County results Ralston: 40–50% 50–60% 60–70% Beveridge: 40–50% 50–60% 60–70%
U.S. senator before election
Harry Stewart New
Republican
Elected U.S. Senator
Samuel M. Ralston
Democratic

1922 United States Senate election in Indiana
Party	Candidate	Votes	%
Democratic	Samuel M. Ralston	558,169	51.55%
Republican	Albert J. Beveridge	524,558	48.45%
Majority		33,611	3.10%
Turnout		1,082,727	
Democratic gain from Republican			

== Iowa (special) ==
1922 United States Senate special election in Iowa
- November 7, 1922
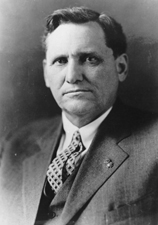

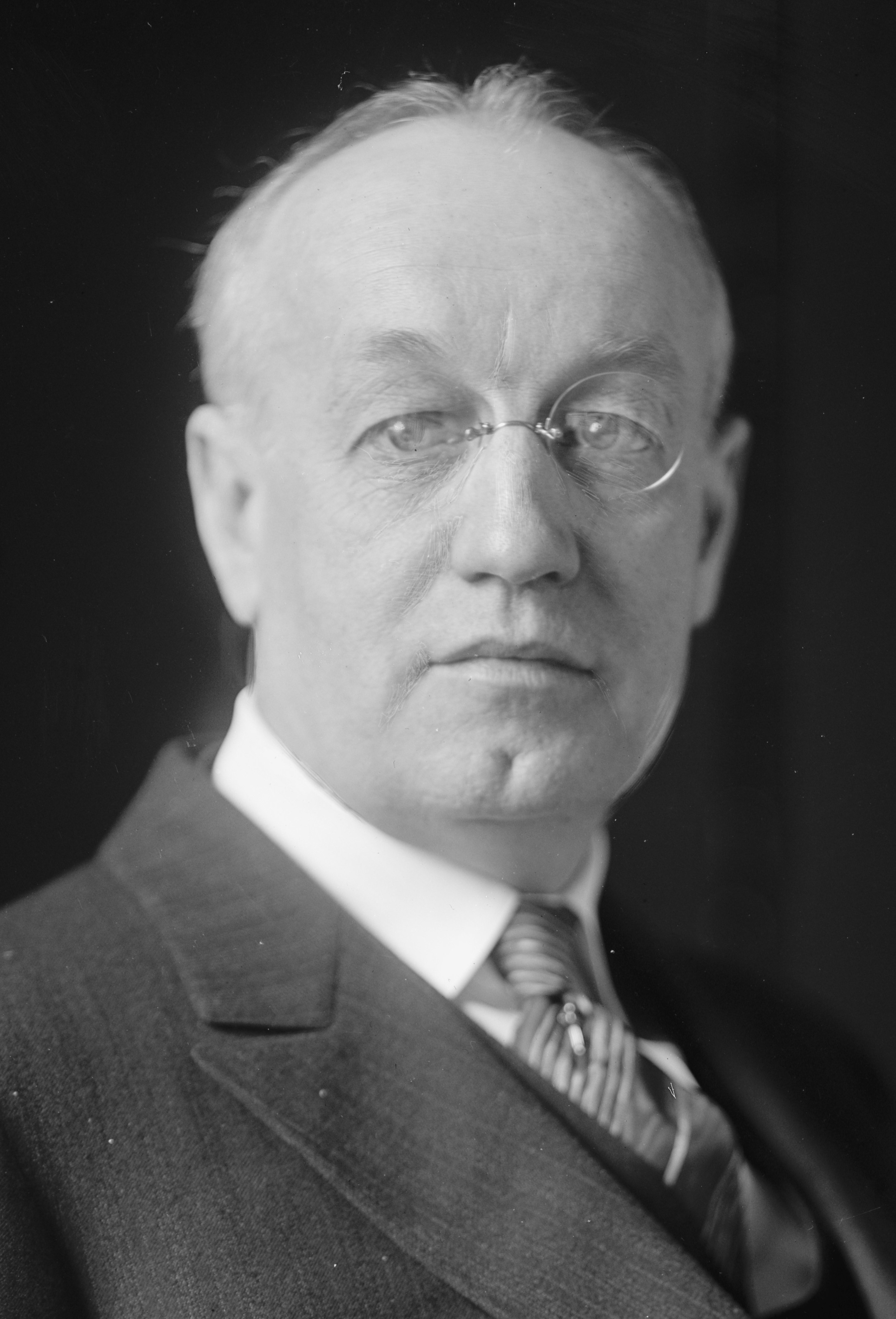
Nominee	Smith W. Brookhart	Clyde Herring
Party	Republican	Democratic
Popular vote	389,751	227,833
Percentage	63.11%	36.89%
- County results Brookhart: 50–60% 60–70% 70–80% 80–90% Herring: 50–60%
U.S. senator before election
Charles A. Rawson
Republican
Elected U.S. Senator
Smith W. Brookhart
Republican

1922 United States Senate special election in Iowa
Party	Candidate	Votes	%
Republican	Smith W. Brookhart	389,751	63.11%
Democratic	Clyde L. Herring	227,833	36.89%
Majority		161,918	27.22%
Turnout		617,584	
Republican hold			

== Maine ==
1922 United States Senate election in Maine
- November 7, 1922
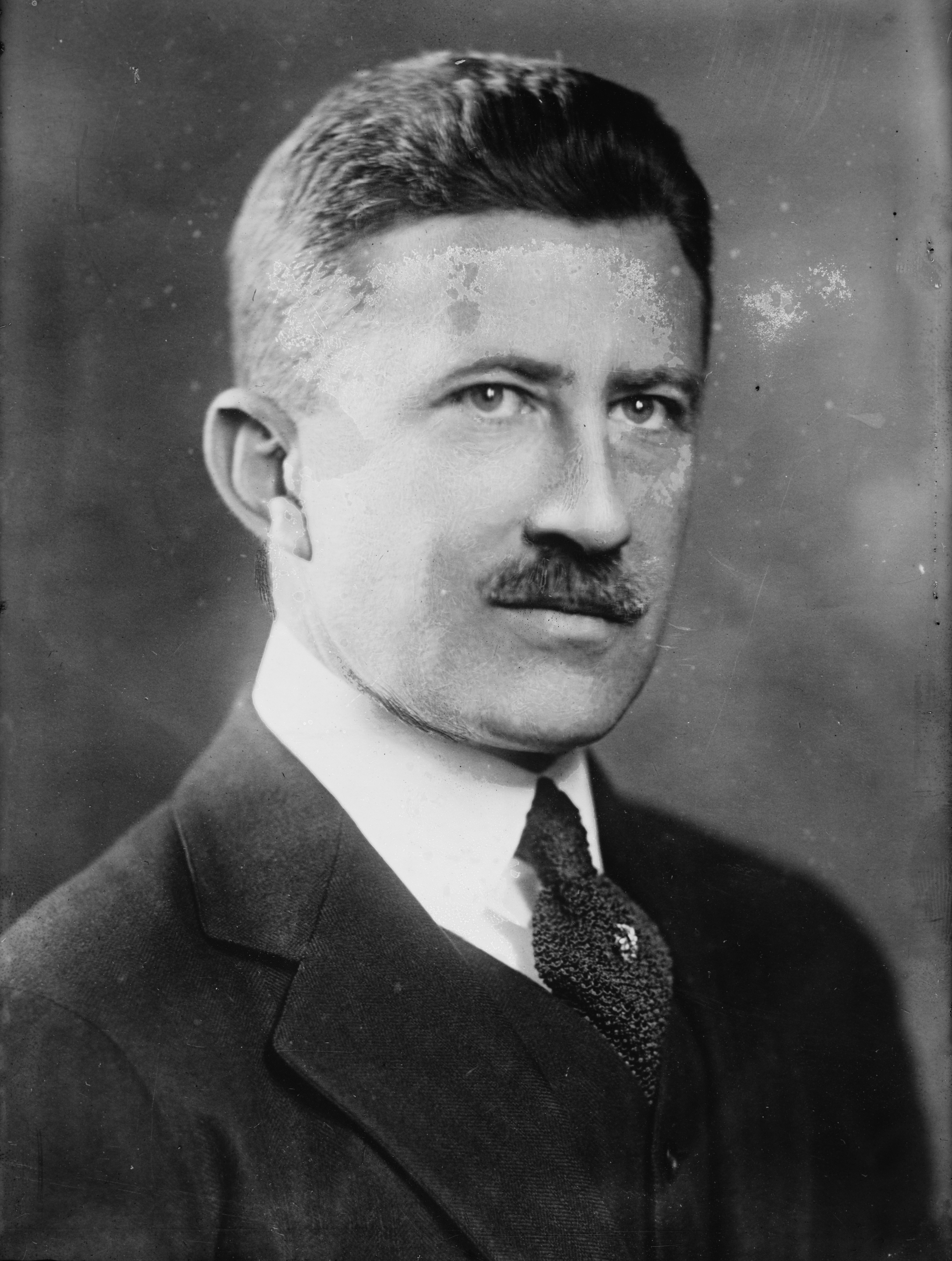

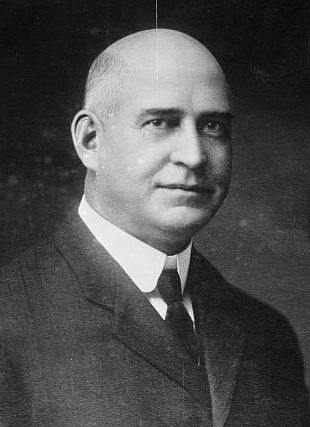
Nominee	Frederick Hale	Oakley C. Curtis
Party	Republican	Democratic
Popular vote	101,026	74,660
Percentage	57.50%	42.50%
- County Results; Hale: 50–60% 60–70% 70–80% Curtis: 50–60%
U.S. senator before election
Frederick Hale
Republican
Elected U.S. Senator
Frederick Hale
Republican

1922 United States Senate election in Maine
Party	Candidate	Votes	%
Republican	Frederick Hale (Incumbent)	101,026	57.50%
Democratic	Oakley C. Curtis	74,660	42.50%
Majority		26,366	15.00%
Turnout		175,686	
Republican hold			

== Maryland ==
1922 United States Senate election in Maryland
- November 7, 1922
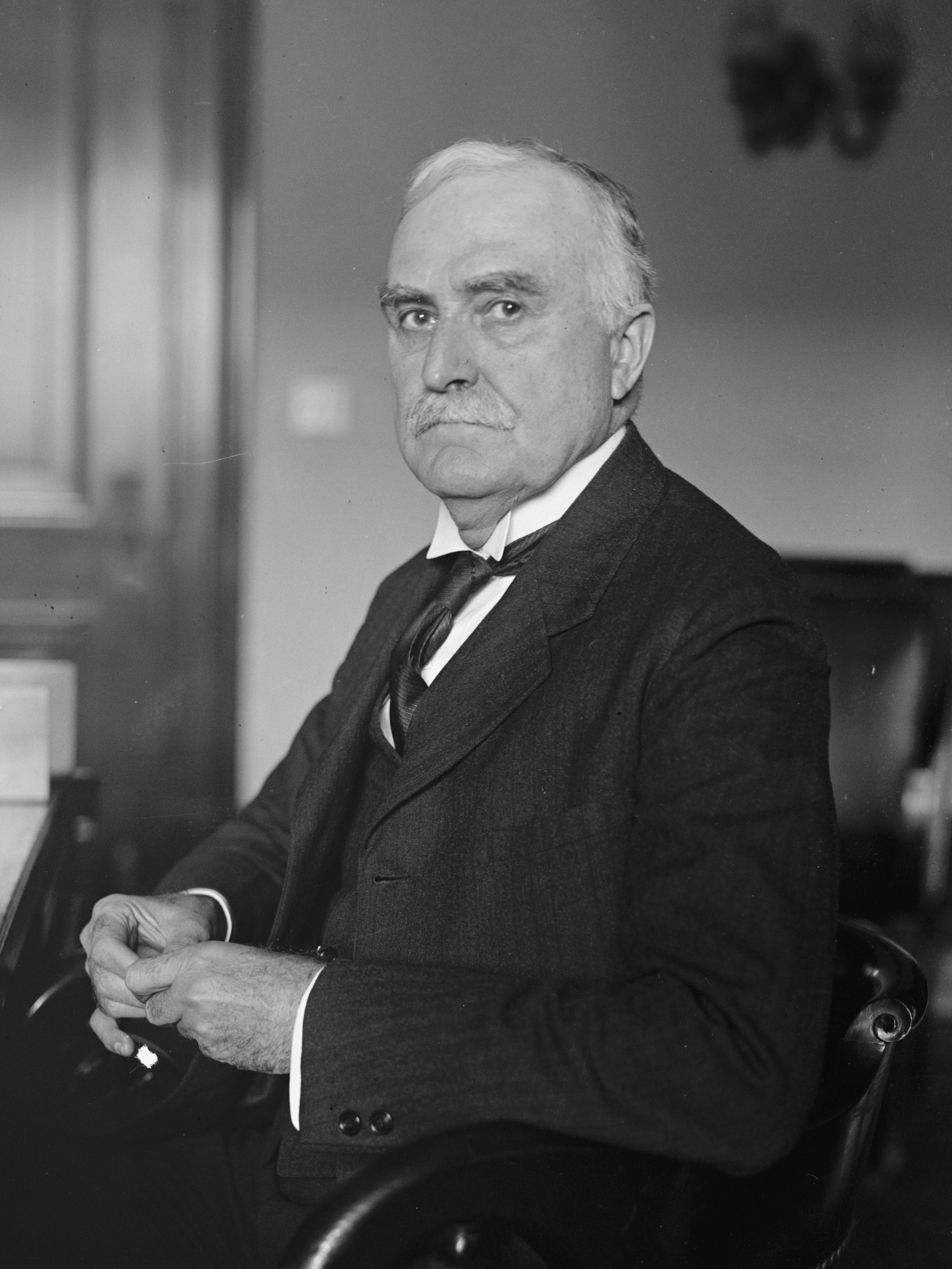

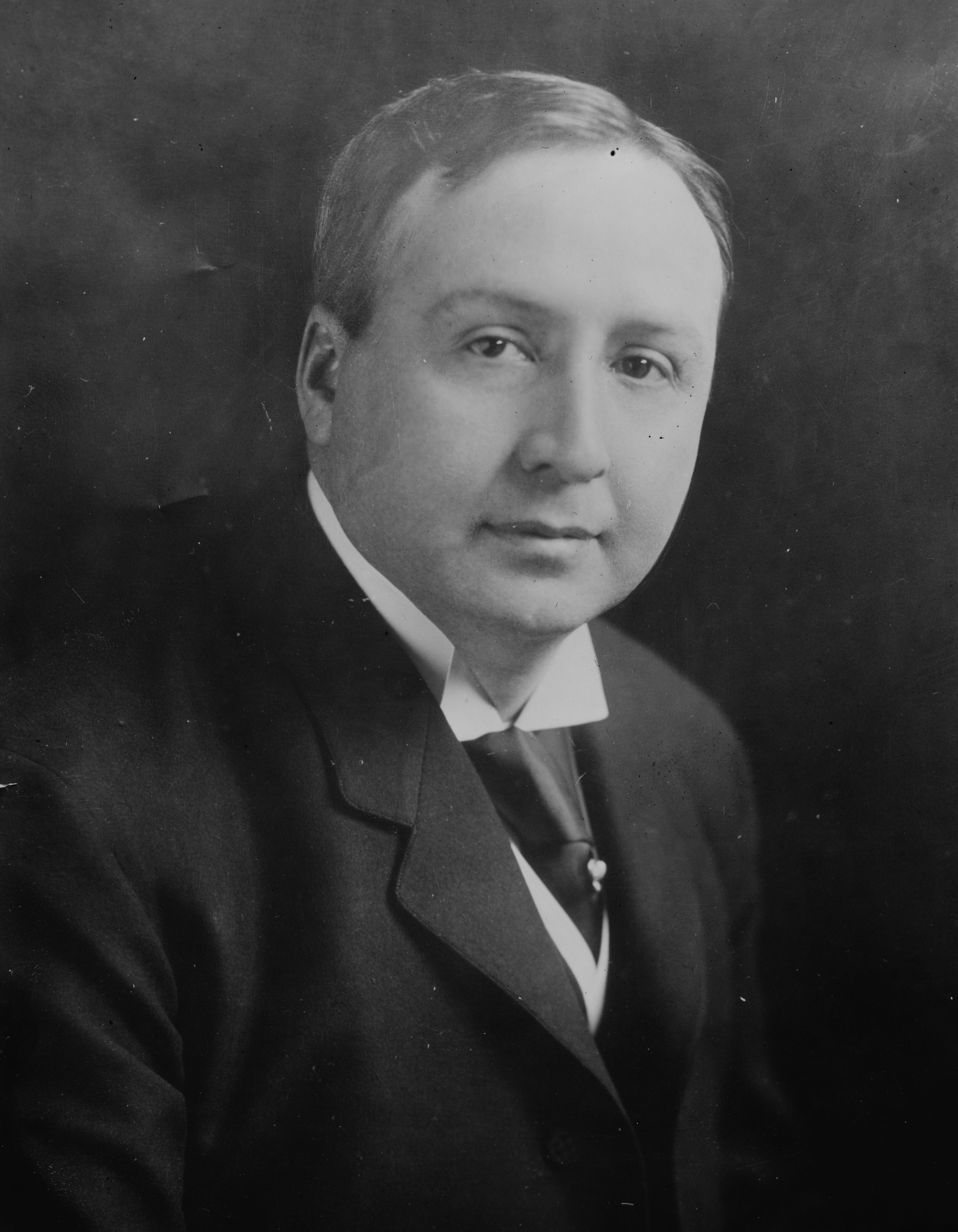
Nominee	William Cabell Bruce	Joseph I. France
Party	Democratic	Republican
Popular vote	160,947	139,581
Percentage	52.61%	45.63%
- County results France: 40–50% 50–60% Bruce: 50–60% 60–70%
U.S. senator before election
Joseph I. France
Republican
Elected U.S. Senator
William Cabell Bruce
Democratic

1922 United States Senate election in Maryland
Party	Candidate	Votes	%
Democratic	William Cabell Bruce	160,947	52.61%
Republican	Joseph I. France (Incumbent)	139,581	45.63%
Labor	Robert E. Long	2,909	0.95%
Socialist	James L. Smiley	2,479	0.81%
Majority		21,366	6.98%
Turnout		305,916	
Democratic gain from Republican			

== Massachusetts ==
1922 United States Senate election in Massachusetts
- November 7, 1922
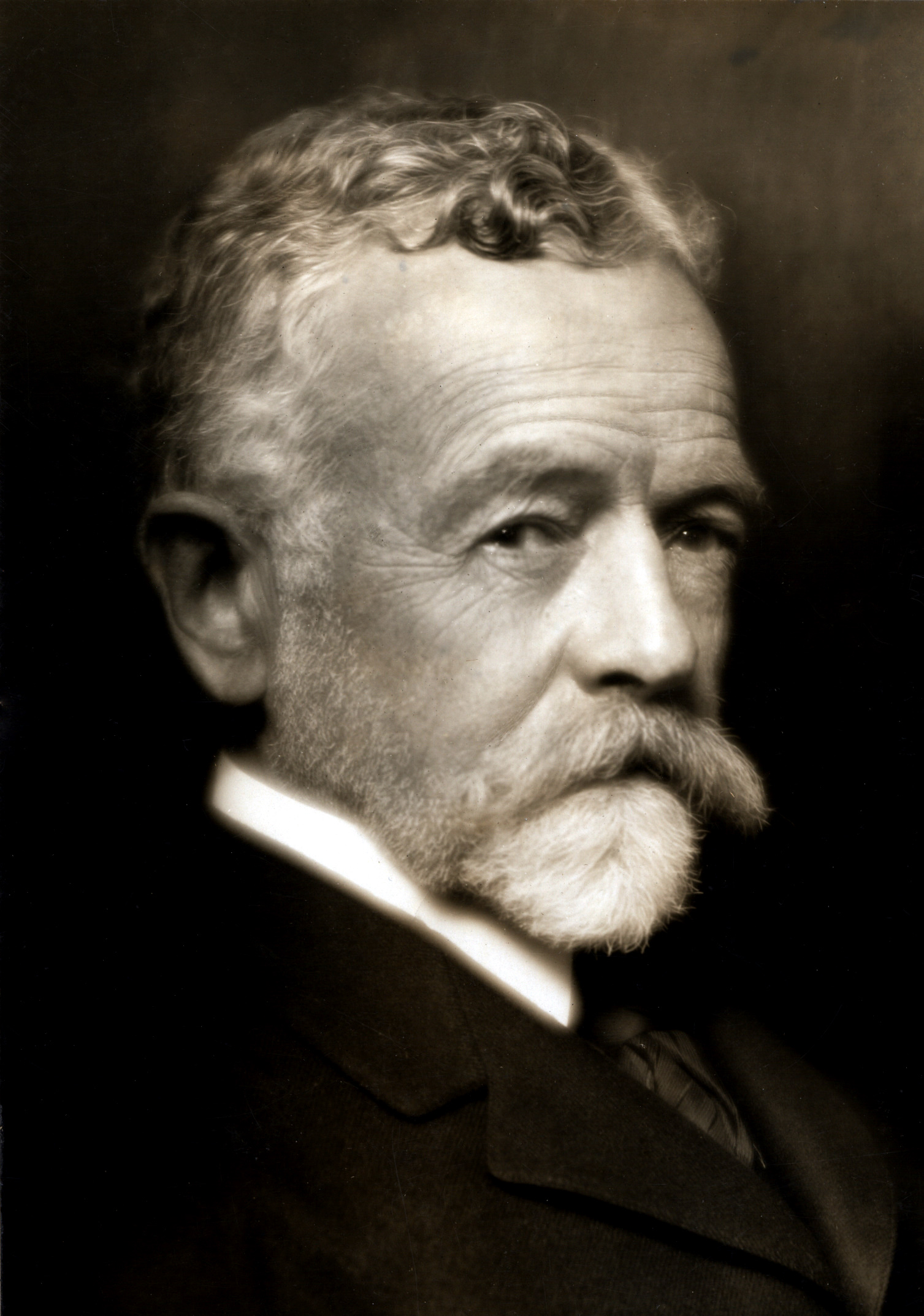

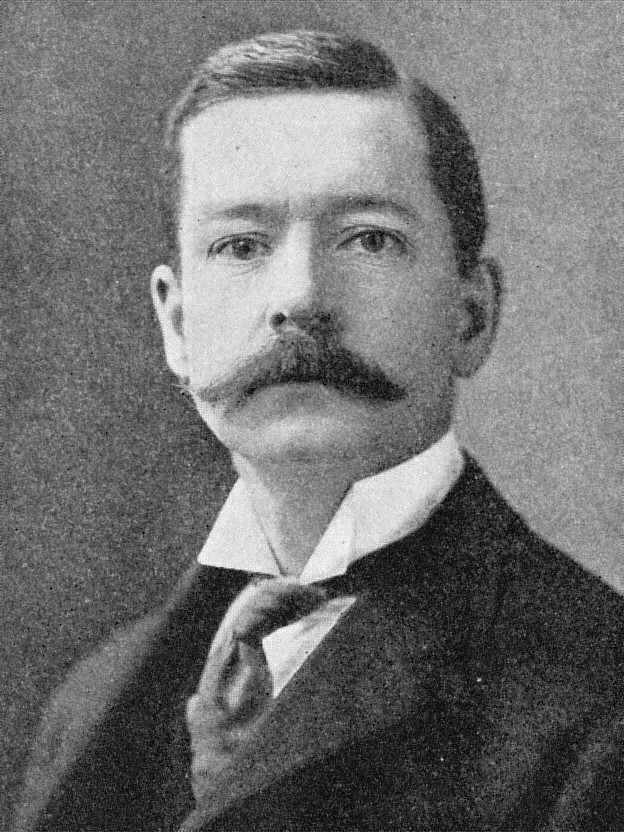
Nominee	Henry Cabot Lodge	William A. Gaston
Party	Republican	Democratic
Popular vote	414,130	406,776
Percentage	47.59%	46.67%
- Lodge: 40–50% 50–60% 60–70% 70–80% 80–90% 90–100% Gaston: 40–50% 50–60% 60–70% 70–80%
Senator before election
Henry Cabot Lodge
Republican
Elected Senator
Henry Cabot Lodge
Republican

1922 United States Senate election in Massachusetts
Party	Candidate	Votes	%
Republican	Henry Cabot Lodge (Incumbent)	414,130	47.59%
Democratic	William A. Gaston	406,776	46.75%
Prohibition	John A. Nichols	24,866	2.86%
Socialist	John Weaver Sherman	11,678	1.34%
Independent	Washington Cook	7,836	0.90%
Progressive	William E. Weeks	4,862	0.56%
Majority		7,354	0.84%
Turnout		870,148	
Republican hold			

== Michigan ==
1922 United States Senate election in Michigan
- November 7, 1922
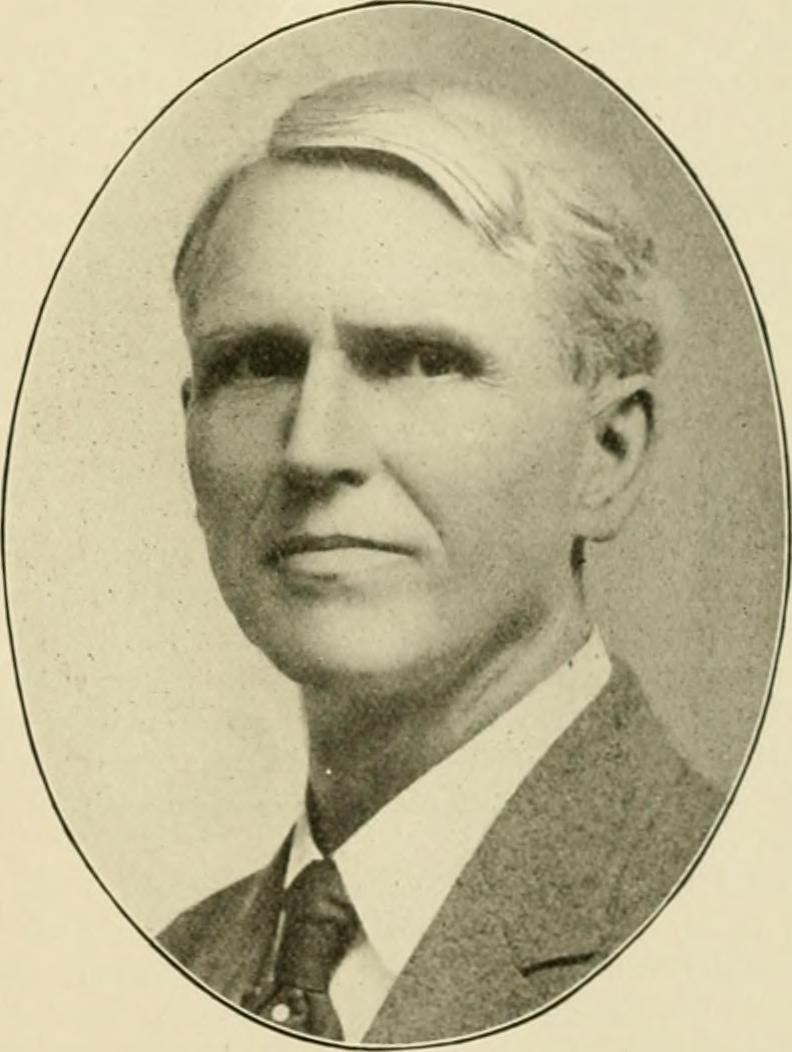

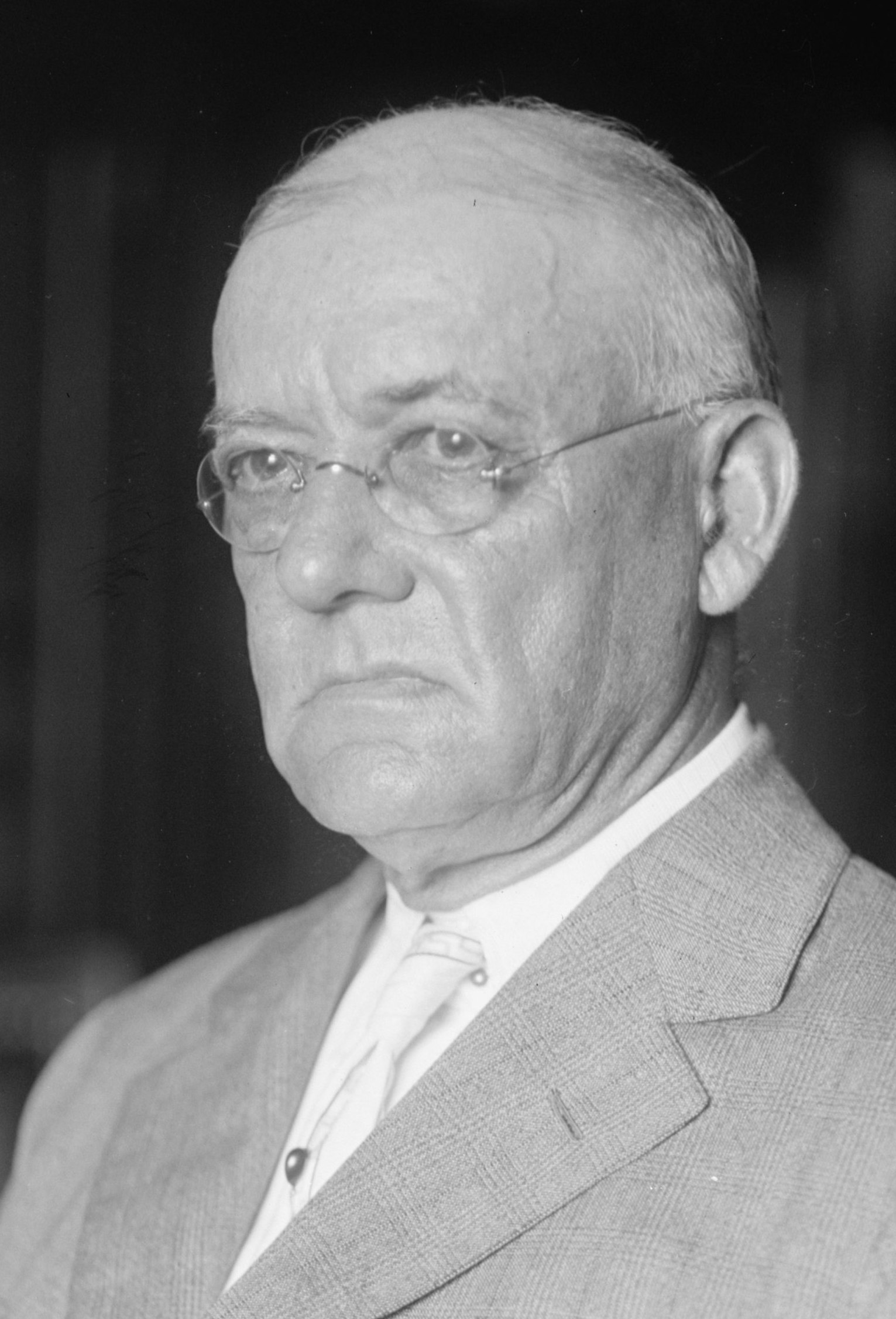
Nominee	Woodbridge N. Ferris	Charles E. Townsend
Party	Democratic	Republican
Popular vote	294,932	281,843
Percentage	50.59%	48.35%
- County results Ferris: 40–50% 50–60% 60–70% Townsend: 40–50% 50–60% 60–70% 70–80% 80–90%
U.S. senator before election
Charles E. Townsend
Republican
Elected U.S. Senator
Woodbridge N. Ferris
Democratic

1922 United States Senate election in Michigan
Party	Candidate	Votes	%
Democratic	Woodbridge N. Ferris	294,932	50.59%
Republican	Charles E. Townsend (Incumbent)	281,843	48.35%
Socialist	William L. Krieghoff	4,249	0.73%
Prohibition	Frank E. Titus	1,936	0.33%
Majority		13,089	2.24%
Turnout		582,960	
Democratic hold			

== Minnesota ==
1922 United States Senate election in Minnesota
- November 7, 1922
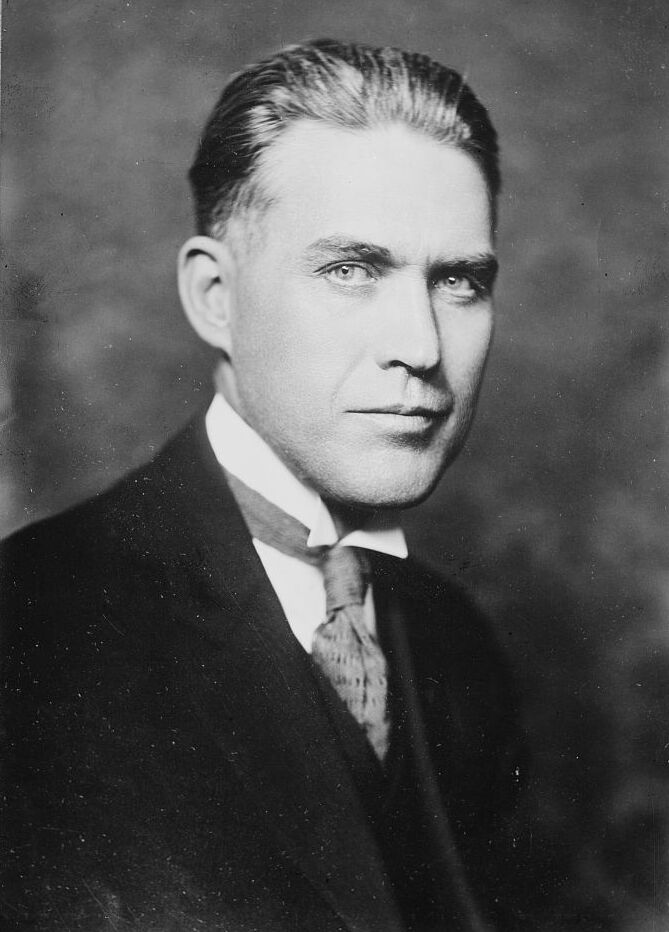

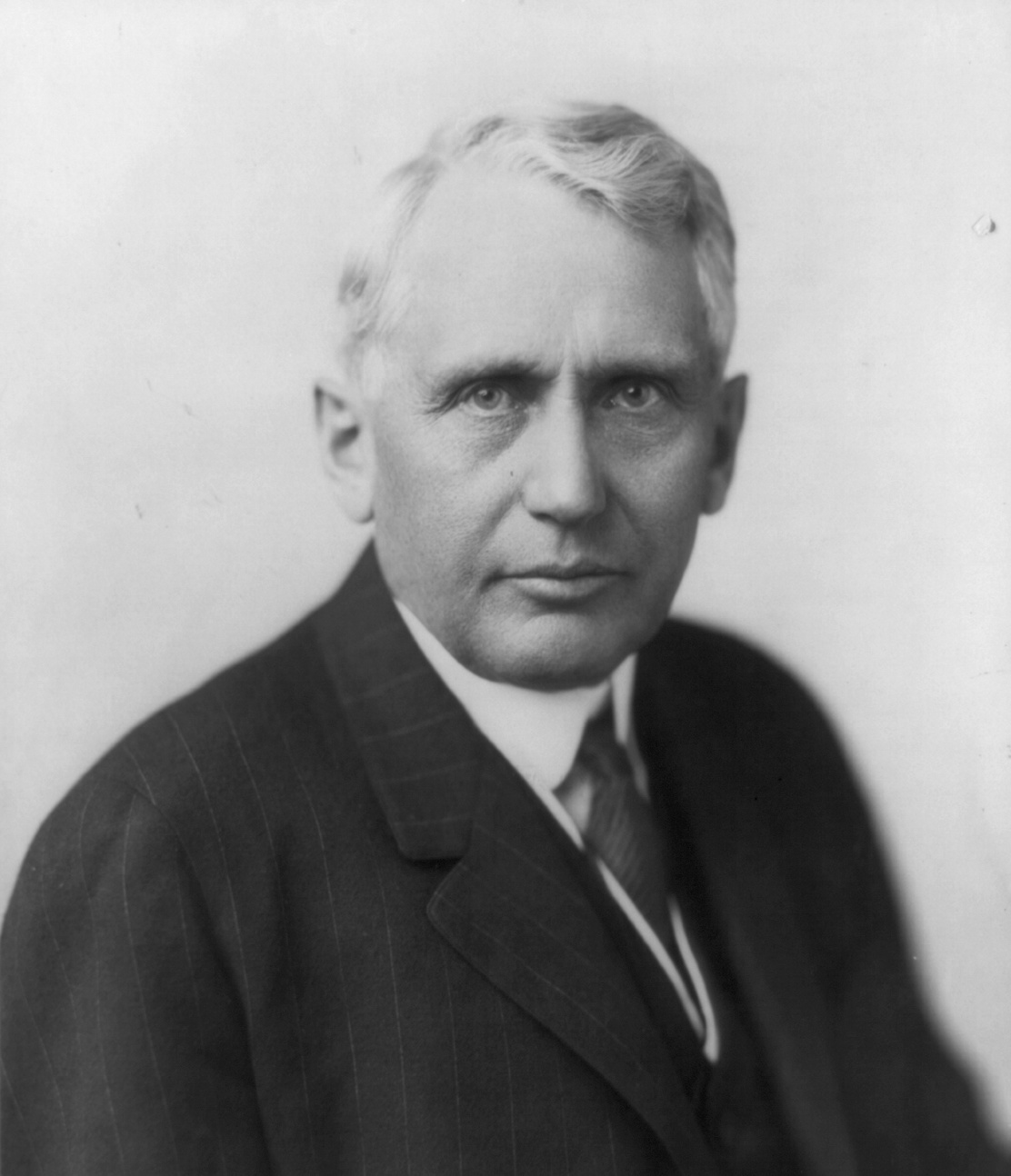

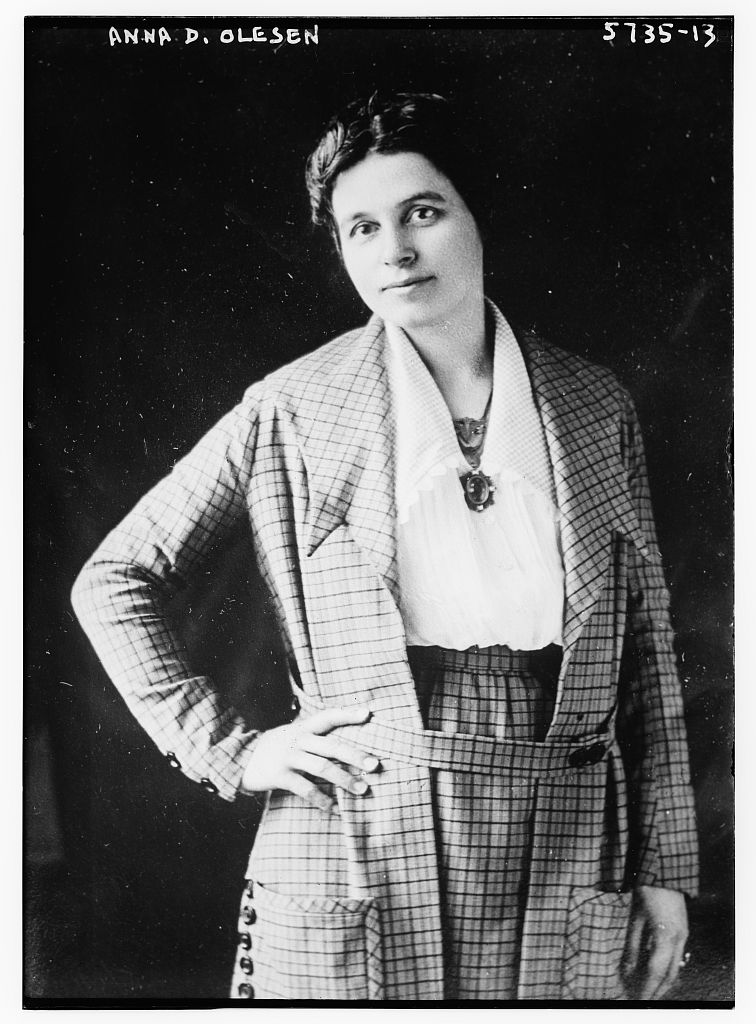
Nominee	Henrik Shipstead	Frank B. Kellogg	Anna D. Olesen
Party	Farmer–Labor	Republican	Democratic
Popular vote	325,372	241,833	123,624
Percentage	47.10%	35.01%	17.89%
- County results Shipstead: 30–40% 40–50% 50–60% 60–70% 70–80% Kellogg: 30–40% 40–50% 50–60% Olesen: 40–50%
U.S. senator before election
Frank B. Kellogg
Republican
Elected U.S. Senator
Henrik Shipstead
Farmer–Labor

1922 United States Senate election in Minnesota
Party	Candidate	Votes	%
Farmer–Labor	Henrik Shipstead	325,372	47.10%
Republican	Frank B. Kellogg (Incumbent)	241,833	35.01%
Democratic	Anna Dickie Olesen	123,624	17.90%
Majority		83,539	12.09%
Turnout		690,829	
Farmer–Labor gain from Republican			

== Mississippi ==
Mississippi election
- September 5, 1922
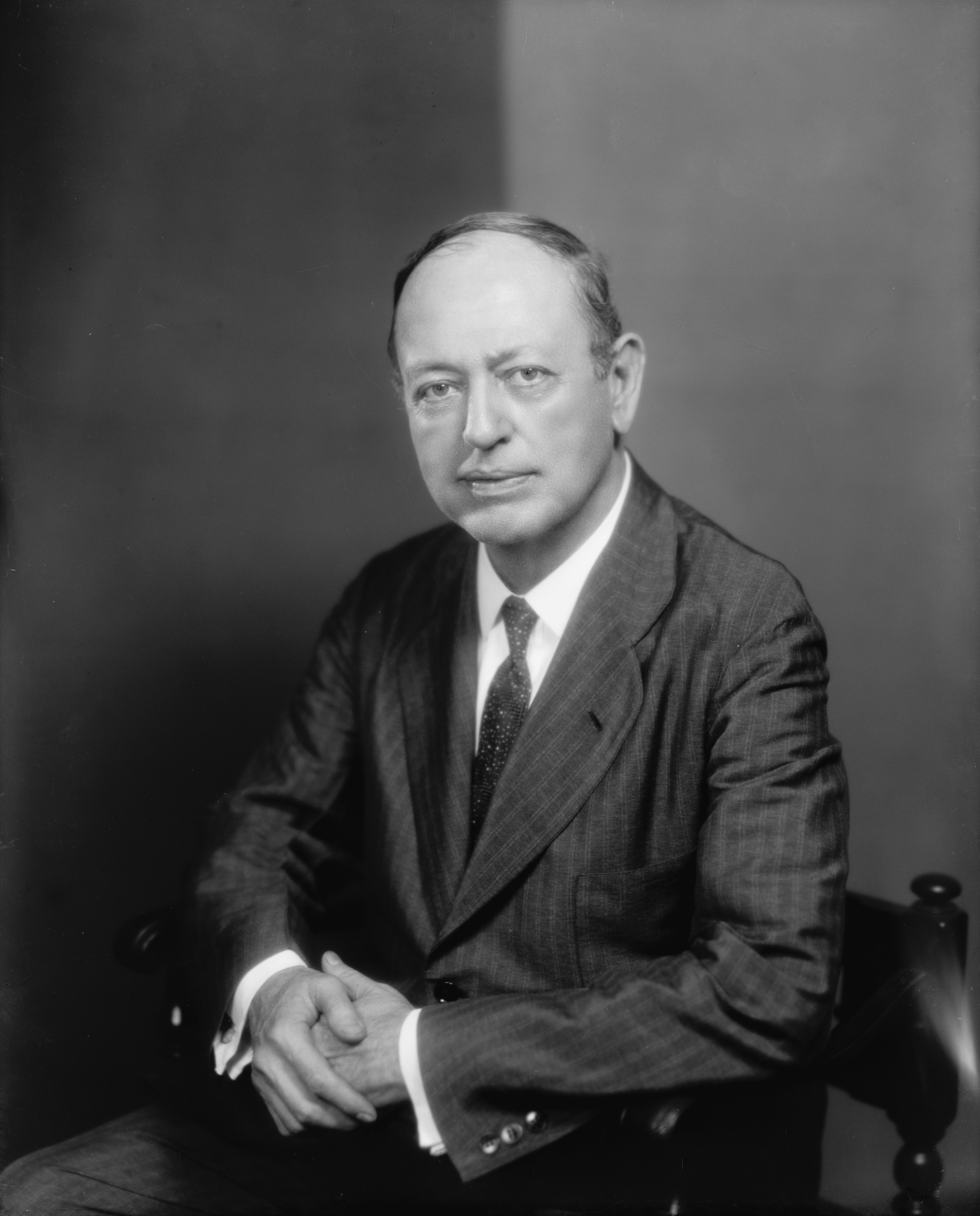

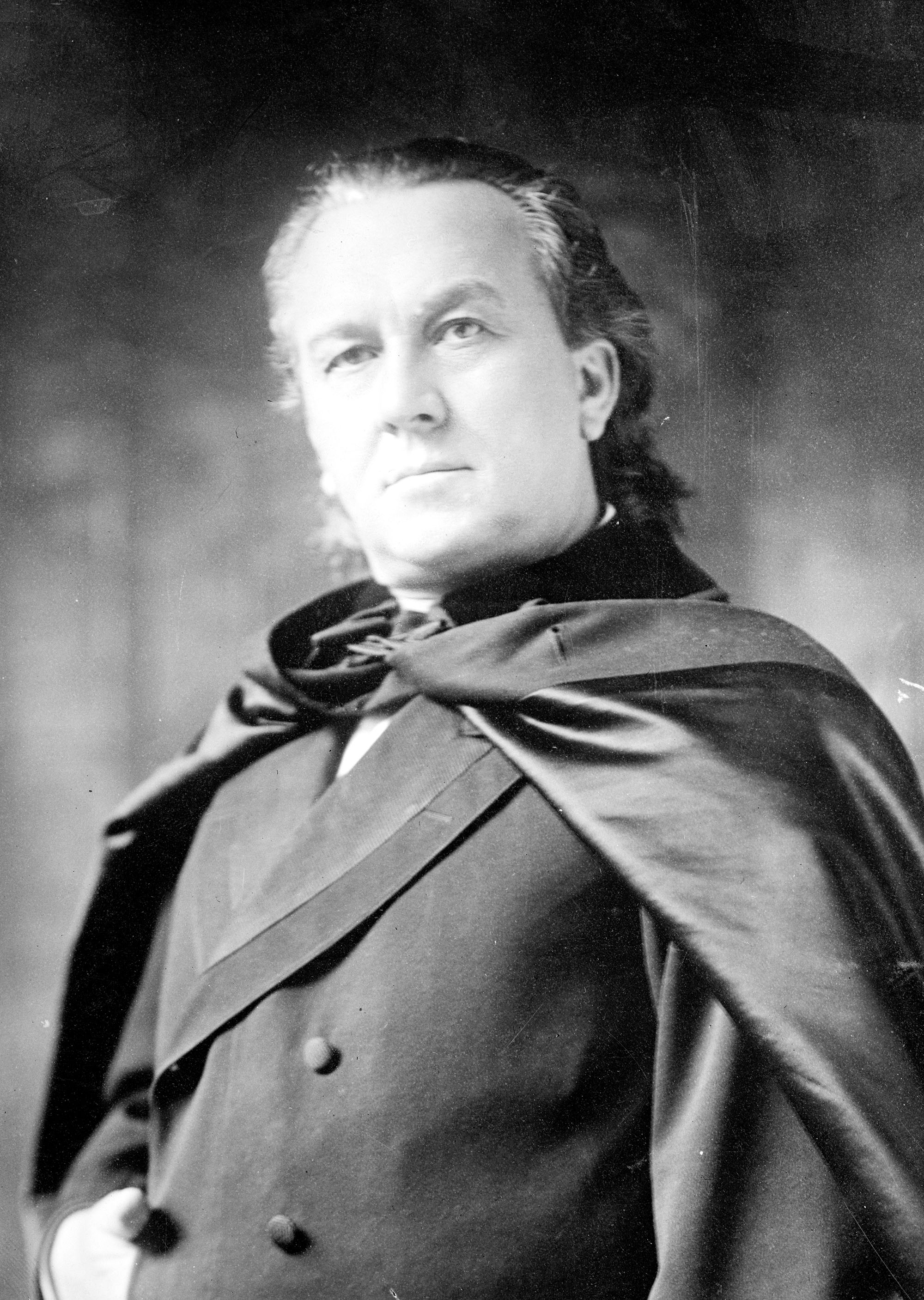
Nominee	Hubert D. Stephens	James K. Vardaman
Party	Democratic	Democratic
Popular vote	95,351	86,853
Percentage	52.33%	47.67%
U.S. senator before election
John Sharp Williams
Democratic
Elected U.S. Senator
Hubert D. Stephens
Democratic

1922 United States Senate election in Mississippi
Party	Candidate	Votes	%
Democratic	Hubert D. Stephens	63,639	92.84%
Republican	John C. Cook	3,632	5.30%
Socialist	Sumner W. Rose	1,273	1.86%
Majority		60007	87.54%
Turnout		68544	
Democratic hold			

== Missouri ==
1922 United States Senate election in Missouri
- November 7, 1922
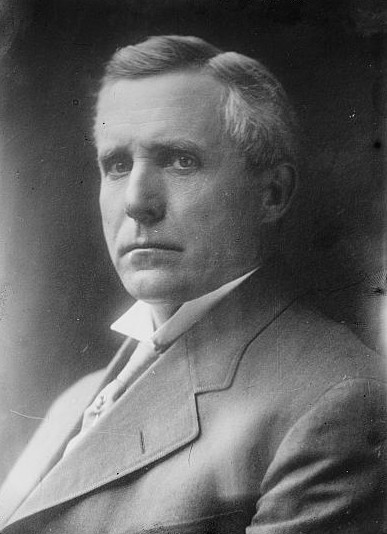

Nominee	James A. Reed	R.R. Brewster
Party	Democratic	Republican
Popular vote	506,264	462,009
Percentage	51.85%	47.32%
- Results by county Reed: 40–50% 50–60% 60–70% 70–80% Brewster: 40–50% 50–60% 60–70% 70–80%
U.S. senator before election
James A. Reed
Democratic
Elected U.S. Senator
James A. Reed
Democratic

1922 Missouri United States Senate election
Party	Candidate	Votes	%
Democratic	James A. Reed (Incumbent)	506,264	51.85%
Republican	R. R. Brewster	462,009	47.32%
Socialist	W. M. Brandt	7,119	0.73%
Socialist Labor	William Wesley Cox	970	0.10%
Majority		44,255	4.53%
Turnout		976,362	
Democratic hold			

== Montana ==
1922 United States Senate election in Montana
- November 7, 1922
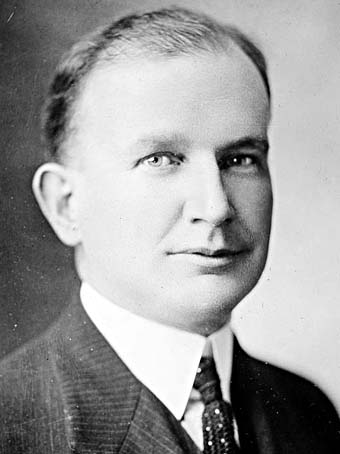

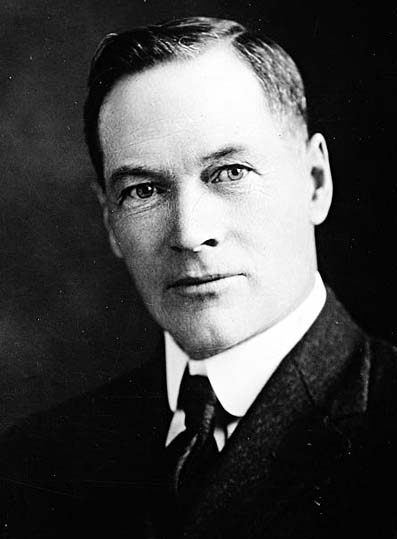
Nominee	Burton K. Wheeler	Carl W. Riddick
Party	Democratic	Republican
Popular vote	88,205	69,494
Percentage	55.56%	43.77%
- County Results; Wheeler: 40–50% 50–60% 60–70% 70–80% Riddick: 40–50% 50–60% 60–70% 70–80%
U.S. senator before election
Henry L. Myers
Democratic
Elected U.S. Senator
Burton K. Wheeler
Democratic

1922 United States Senate election in Montana
Party	Candidate	Votes	%
Democratic	Burton K. Wheeler (Incumbent)	88,205	55.57%
Republican	Carl W. Riddick	69,464	43.76%
Socialist	George H. Ambrose	1,068	0.67%
Majority		18,741	11.81%
Turnout		158,737	
Democratic hold			

== Nebraska ==
1922 United States Senate election in Nebraska
- November 7, 1922
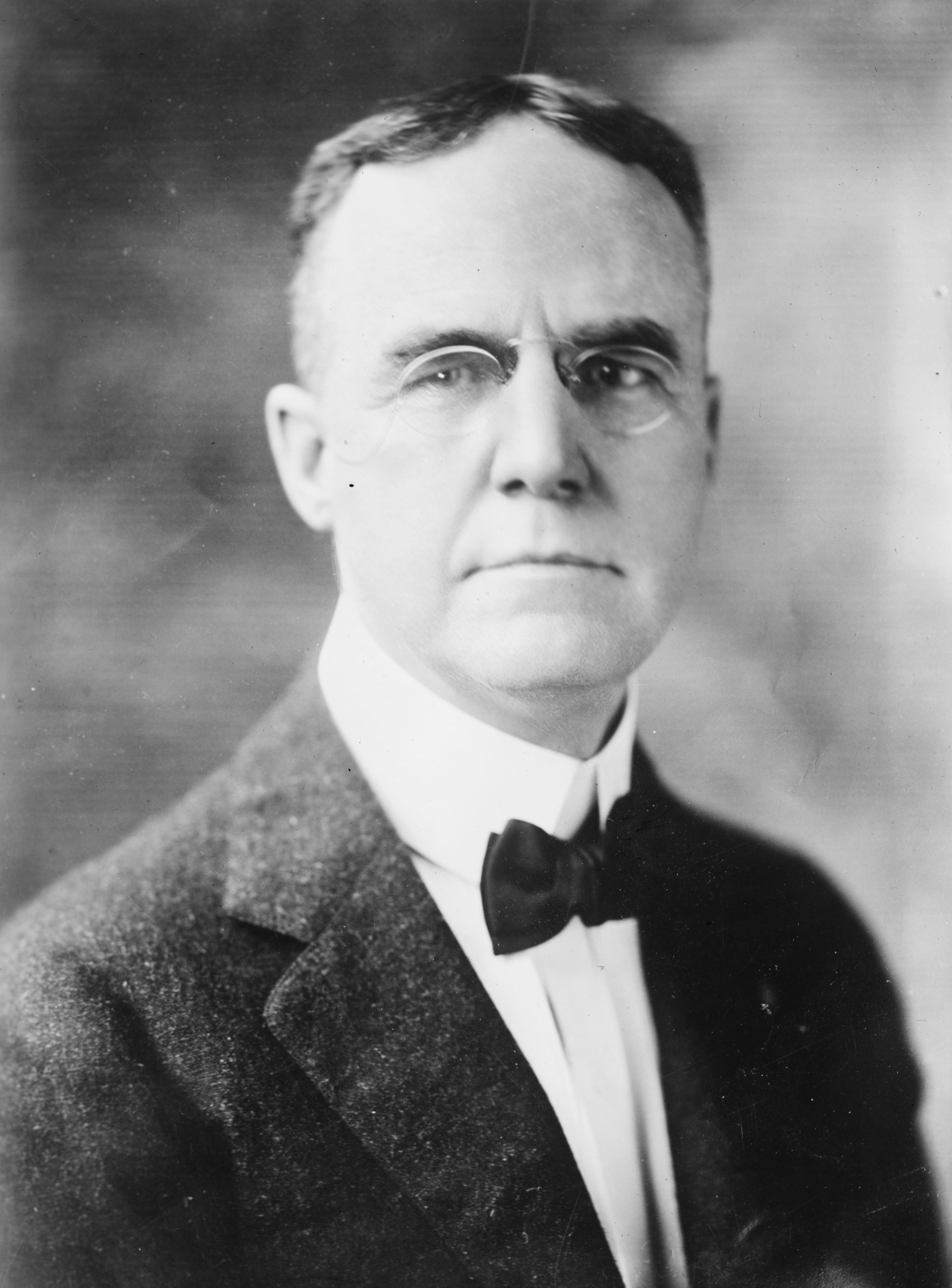

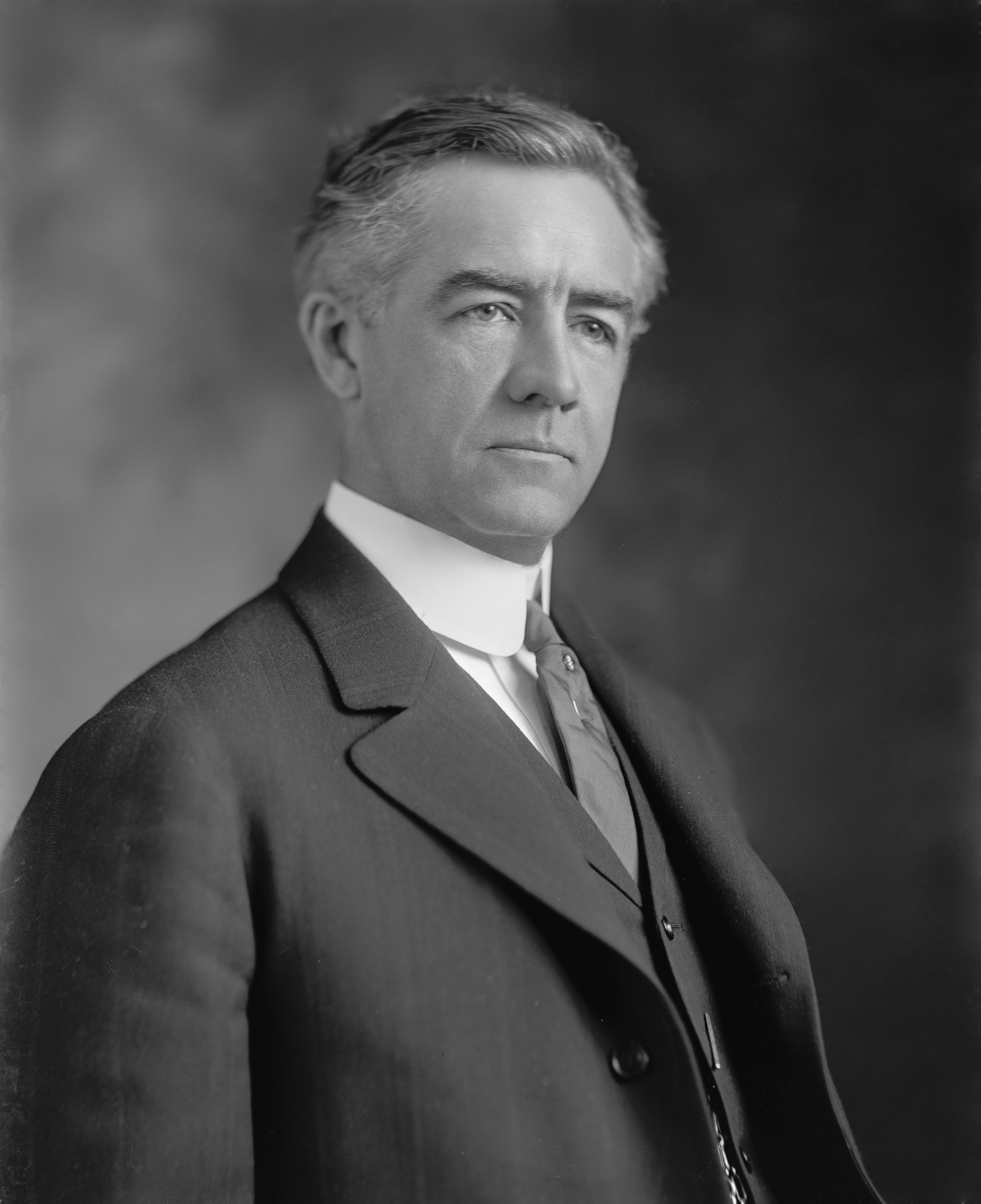
Nominee	Robert B. Howell	Gilbert Hitchcock
Party	Republican	Democratic
Popular vote	220,350	148,265
Percentage	56.84%	38.24%
- County results Howell: 40–50% 50–60% 60–70% 70–80% Hitchcock: 40–50% 50–60%
U.S. senator before election
Gilbert Hitchcock
Democratic
Elected U.S. Senator
Robert B. Howell
Republican

1922 United States Senate election in Nebraska
Party	Candidate	Votes	%
Republican	Robert B. Howell	220,350	56.84%
Democratic	Gilbert Hitchcock (Incumbent)	148,265	38.24%
Progressive	James L. Beebe	19,076	4.92%
Majority		72,085	18.60%
Turnout		387,691	
Republican gain from Democratic			

== Nevada ==
1922 United States Senate election in Nevada
- November 7, 1922
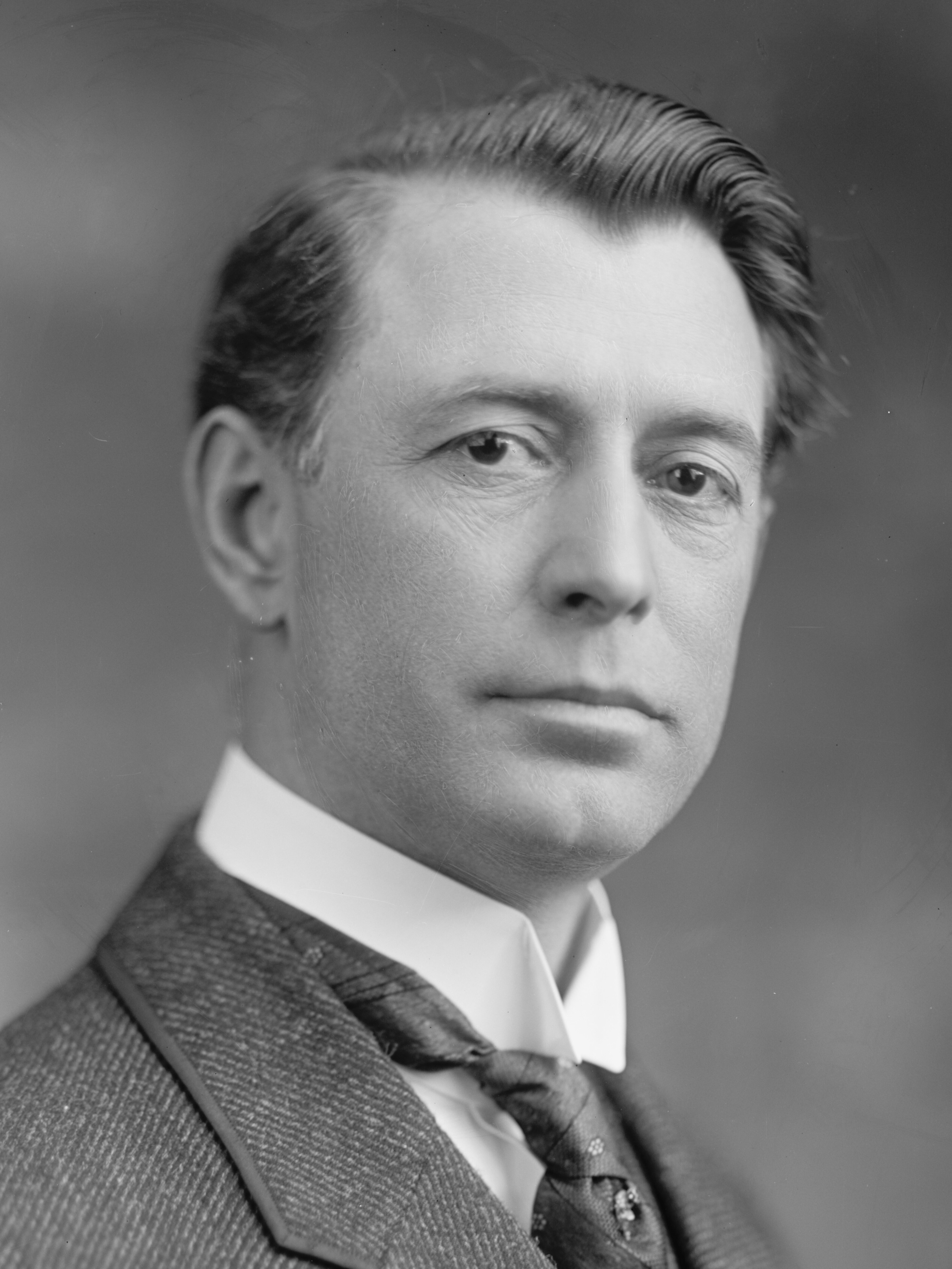

Nominee	Key Pittman	Charles S. Chandler
Party	Democratic	Republican
Popular vote	18,200	10,671
Percentage	63.04%	36.96%
- County Results; Pittman: 50–60% 60–70% 70–80% Chandler: 50–60% 60–70%
U.S. senator before election
Key Pittman
Democratic
Elected U.S. Senator
Key Pittman
Democratic

1922 United States Senate election in Nevada
Party	Candidate	Votes	%
Democratic	Key Pittman (Incumbent)	18,200	63.04%
Republican	Charles S. Chandler	10,671	36.96%
Majority		7,529	26.08%
Turnout		28,871	
Democratic hold			

== New Jersey ==
1922 United States Senate election in New Jersey
- November 7, 1922
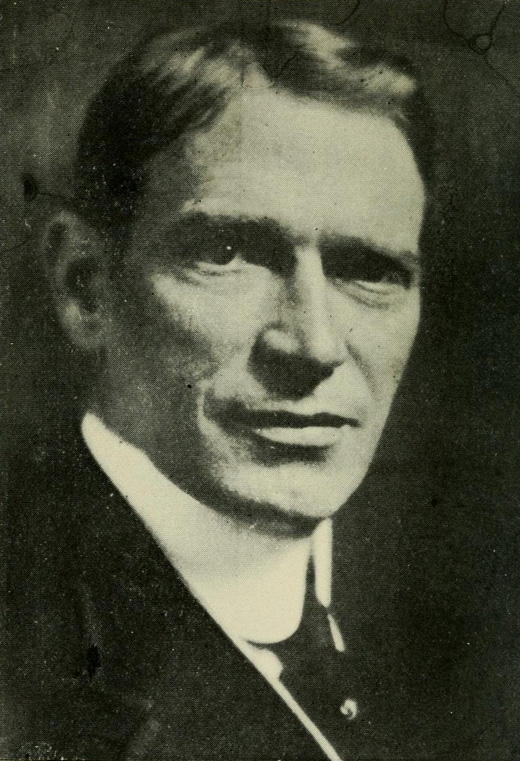

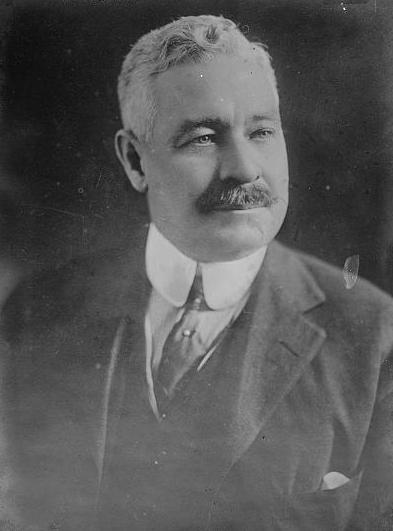
Nominee	Edward I. Edwards	Joseph S. Frelinghuysen Sr.
Party	Democratic	Republican
Popular vote	451,832	362,699
Percentage	54.87%	44.05%
- County results Edwards: 50–60% 70–80% Frelinghuysen: 40–50% 50–60% 60–70%
Senator before election
Joseph S. Frelinghuysen Sr.
Republican
Elected Senator
Edward I. Edwards
Democratic

1922 United States Senate election in New Jersey
Party	Candidate	Votes	%
Democratic	Edward I. Edwards	451,832	55.47%
Republican	Joseph S. Frelinghuysen Sr. (Incumbent)	362,699	44.53%
Majority		89,133	10.94%
Turnout		814,531	
Democratic gain from Republican			

== New Mexico ==
1922 United States Senate election in New Mexico
- November 7, 1922
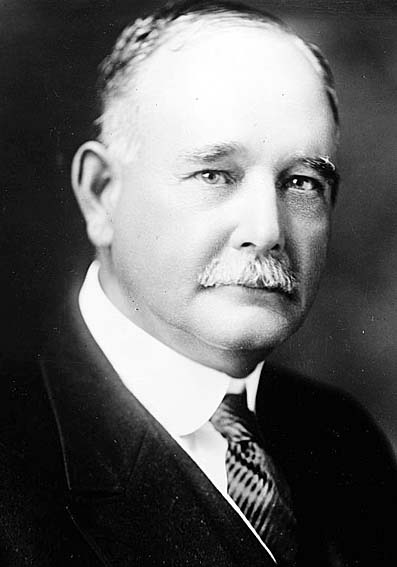

Nominee	Andrieus A. Jones	Stephen B. Davis Jr.
Party	Democratic	Republican
Popular vote	60,969	48,721
Percentage	55.58%	44.42%
- County results Jones: 50–60% 60–70% 70–80% 80–90% Davis: 50–60% 60–70% 70–80%
U.S. senator before election
Andrieus A. Jones
Democratic
Elected U.S. Senator
Andrieus A. Jones
Democratic

1922 United States Senate election in New Mexico
Party	Candidate	Votes	%
Democratic	Andrieus A. Jones (Incumbent)	60,969	55.58%
Republican	Stephen B. Davis, Jr.	48,721	44.42%
Majority		12,248	11.16%
Turnout		109,690	
Democratic hold			

== New York ==
1922 United States Senate election in New York
- November 7, 1922
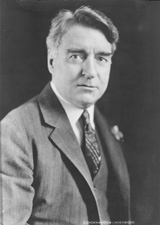

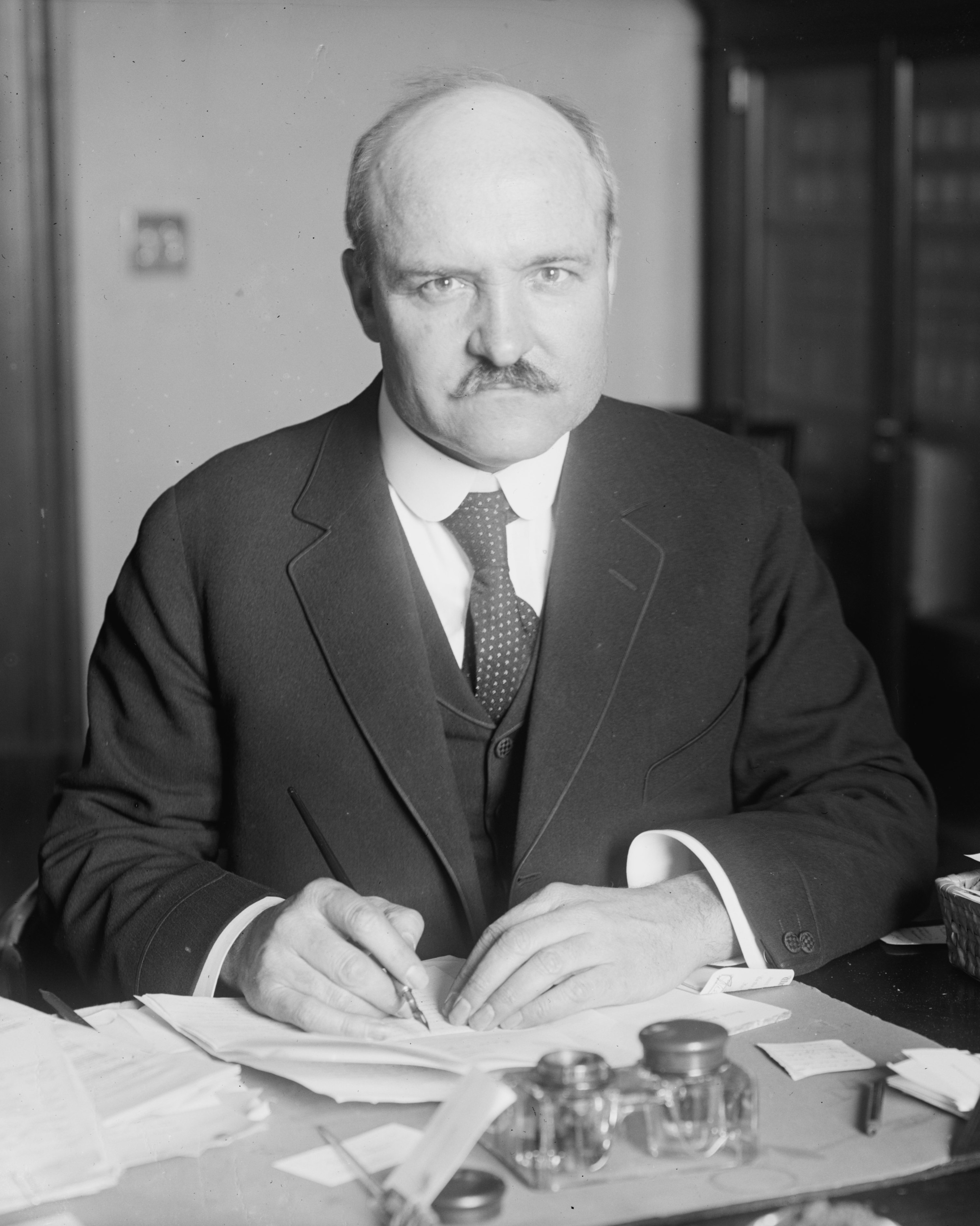
Nominee	Royal S. Copeland	William M. Calder
Party	Democratic	Republican
Popular vote	1,276,667	995,421
Percentage	52.60%	41.01%
- County Results; Copeland: 40–50% 50–60% 60–70% 70–80% Calder: 40–50% 50–60% 60–70%
Senator before election
William M. Calder
Republican
Elected Senator
Royal S. Copeland
Democratic

1922 United States Senate election in New York
Party	Candidate	Votes	%
Democratic	Royal S. Copeland	1,276,667	52.60%
Republican	William M. Calder (Incumbent)	995,421	41.01%
Socialist	Algernon Lee	117,928	4.86%
Prohibition	Coleridge A. Hart	32,124	1.32%
Socialist Labor	Henry Kuhn	4,993	0.21%
Majority		281,246	11.59%
Turnout		2,427,133	
Democratic gain from Republican			

== North Dakota ==
1922 United States Senate election in North Dakota
- November 7, 1922
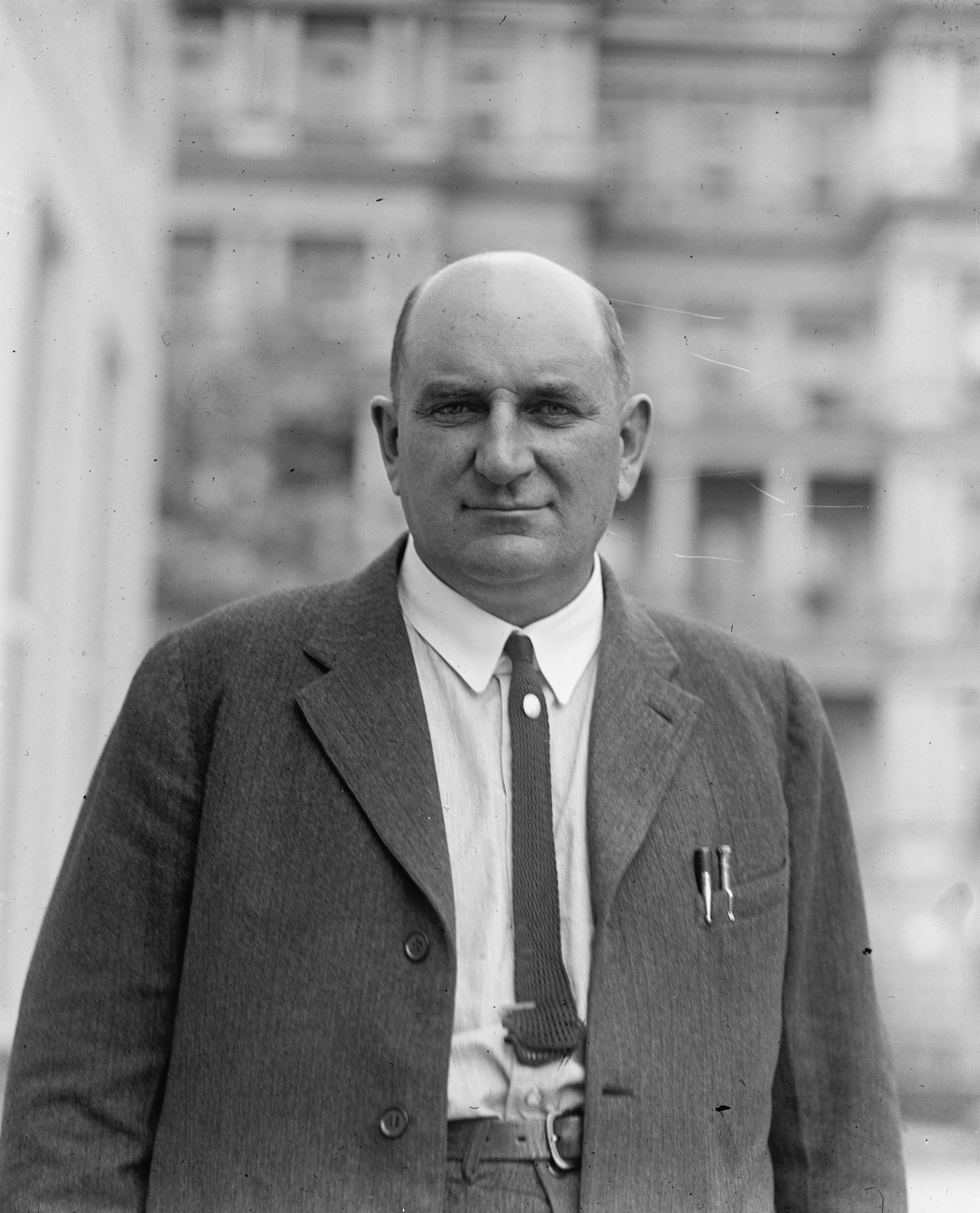

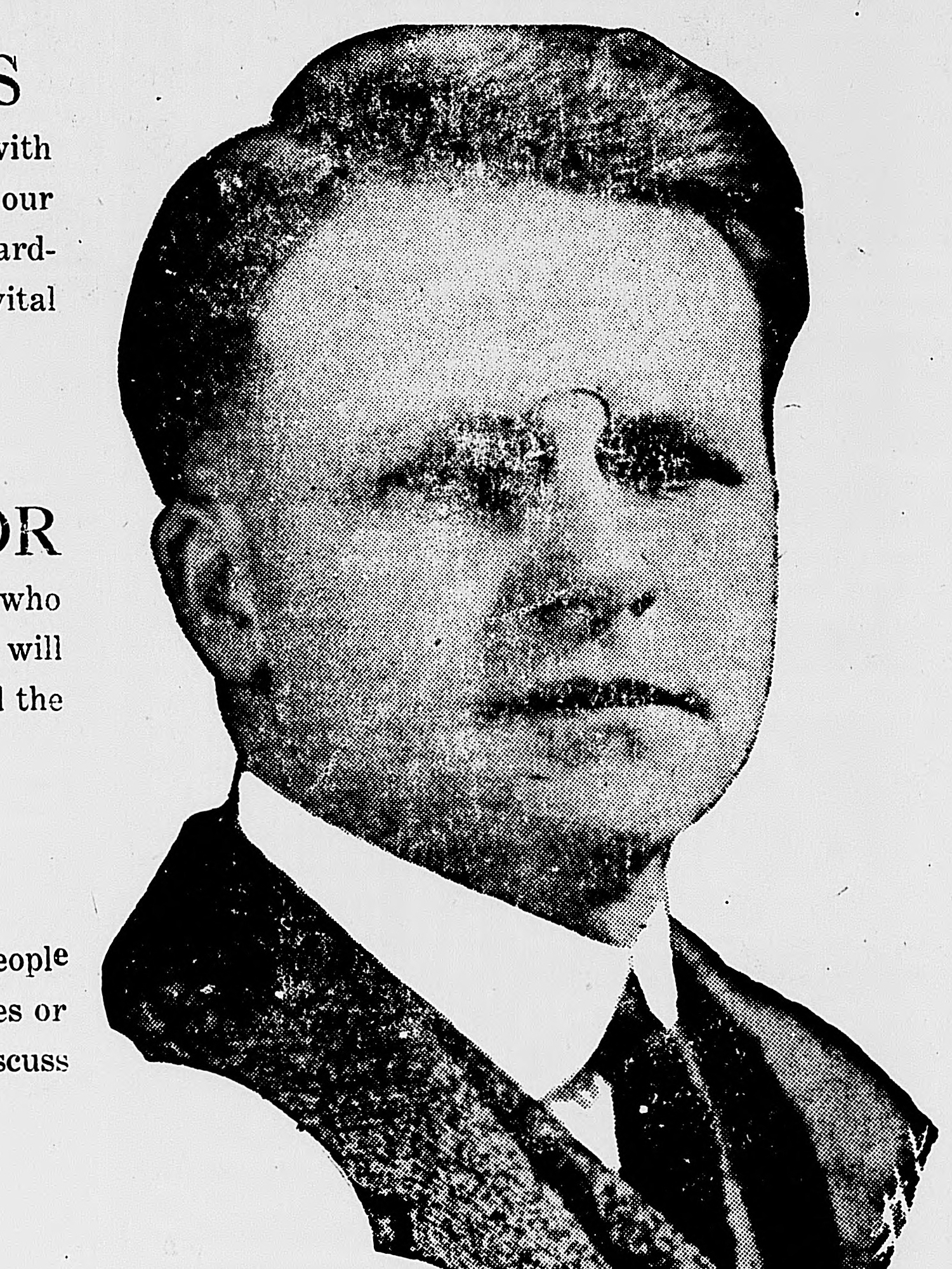
Nominee	Lynn Frazier	James Francis Thaddeus O'Connor
Party	Republican	Democratic
Popular vote	101,312	92,464
Percentage	52.28%	47.72%
- County Results; Frazier: 50–60% 60–70% 70–80% 80–90% O'Connor: 50–60% 60–70%
U.S. senator before election
Porter J. McCumber
Republican
Elected U.S. Senator
Lynn Frazier
Republican

1922 United States Senate election in North Dakota
Party	Candidate	Votes	%	±%
Republican	Lynn Frazier	101,312	52.28%	−1.57%
Democratic	James Francis Thaddeus O'Connor	92,464	47.72%	+9.47%
Majority		8,848	4.57%	−11.04%
Turnout		193,776		
Republican hold				

== Ohio ==
1922 United States Senate election in Ohio
- November 7, 1922
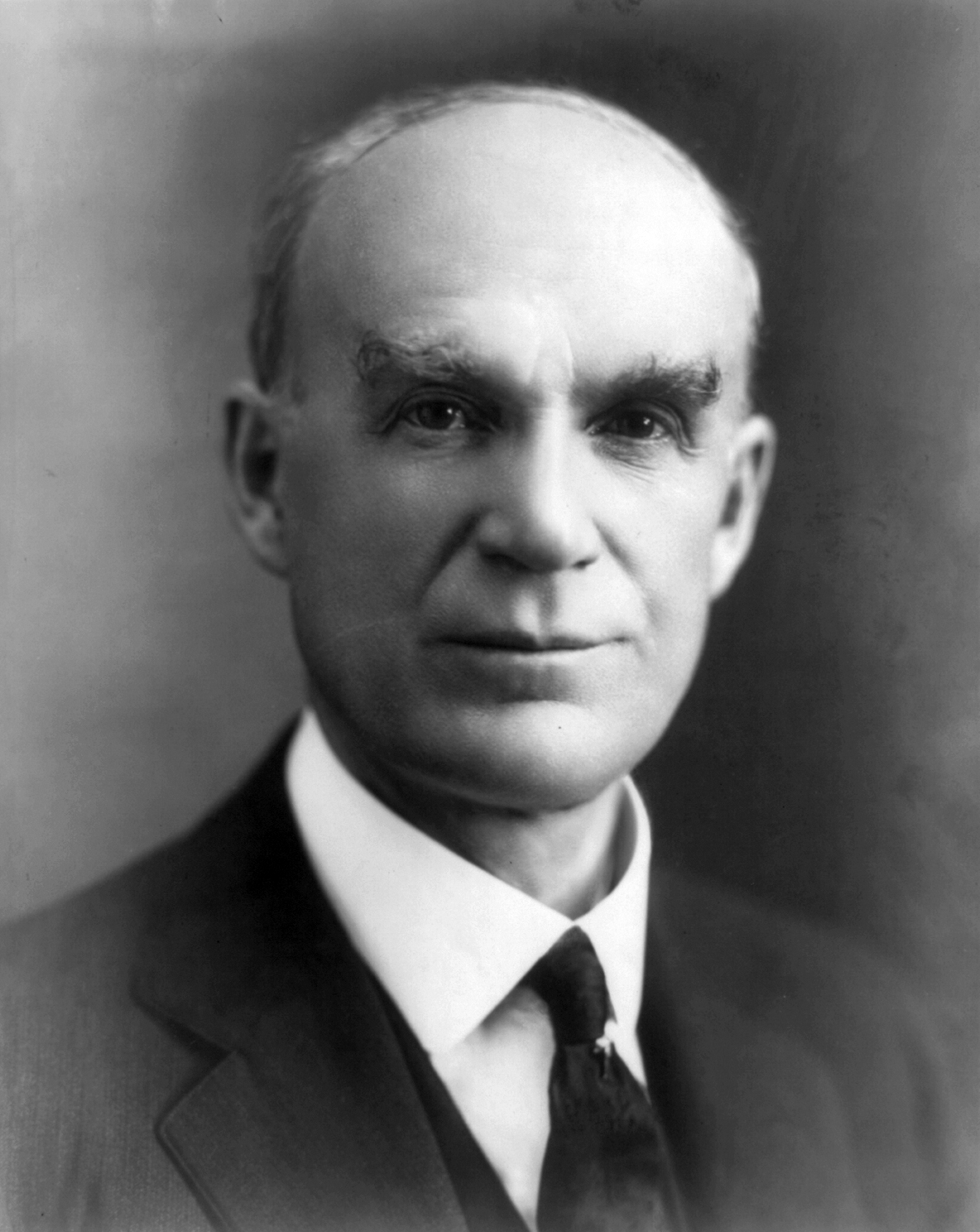

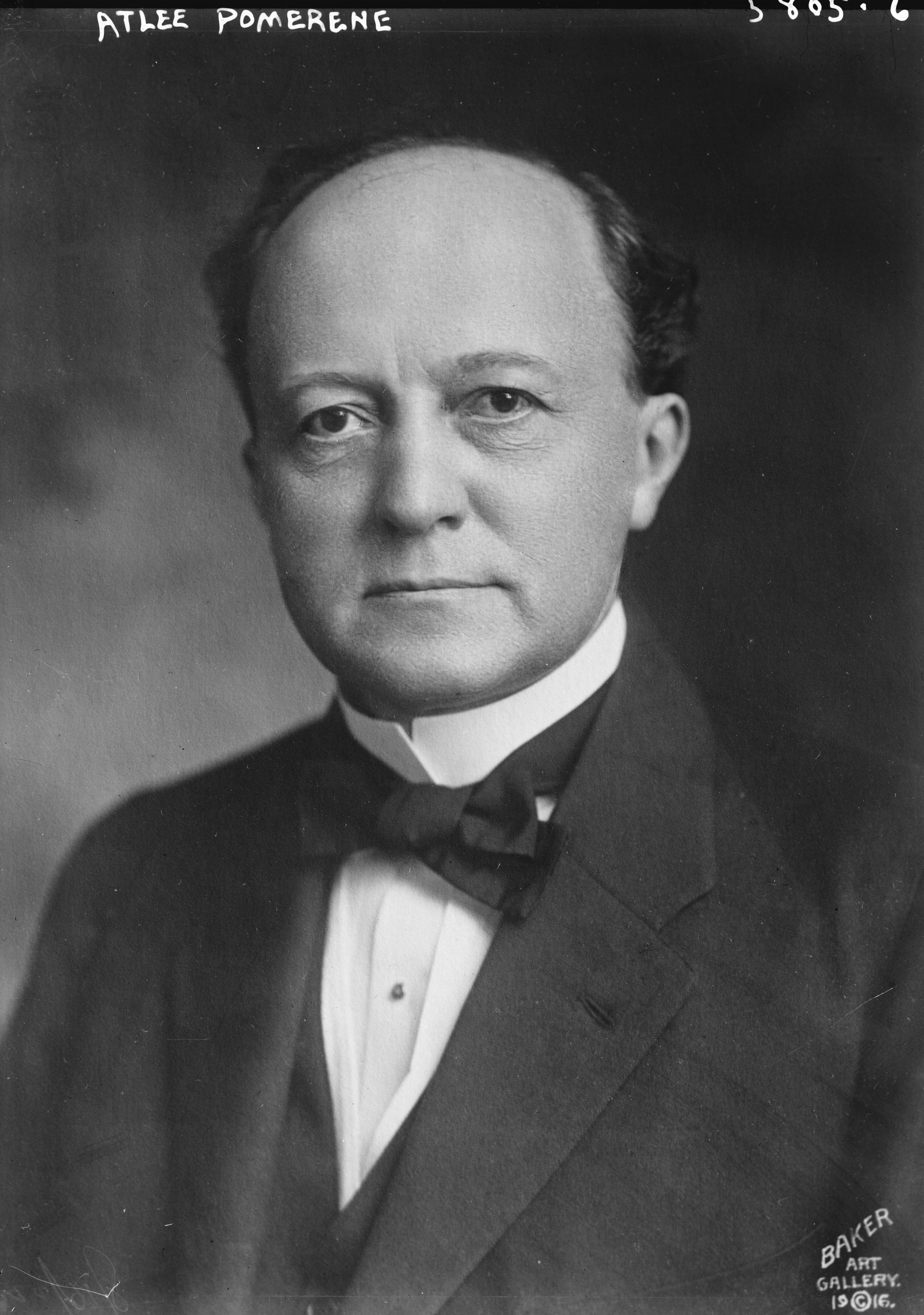
Nominee	Simeon D. Fess	Atlee Pomerene
Party	Republican	Democratic
Popular vote	794,159	744,558
Percentage	50.90%	47.72%
- County Results; Fess: 40–50% 50–60% 60–70% 70–80% Pomerene: 50–60% 60–70%
U.S. senator before election
Atlee Pomerene
Democratic
Elected U.S. Senator
Simeon D. Fess
Republican

1922 United States Senate election in Ohio
Party	Candidate	Votes	%
Republican	Simeon D. Fess	794,159	50.90%
Democratic	Atlee Pomerene (Incumbent)	744,558	47.72%
Independent	Virginia D. Green	21,514	1.38%
Majority		49,601	3.18%
Turnout		1,560,231	
Republican gain from Democratic			

== Pennsylvania ==
There were 3 elections in Pennsylvania.

=== Pennsylvania (special, class 1) ===
One-term Republican Philander C. Knox died October 12, 1921, and Republican state senator William E. Crow was appointed October 24, 1921 to continue the term, pending a special election. Crow then died August 2, 1922, and Republican attorney David A. Reed was appointed, also to continue the term, pending a special election. Reed won that election as well as the election to the next term.

1922 United States Senate special election in Pennsylvania
- November 7, 1922
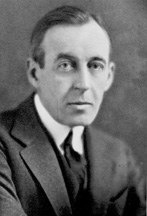

Nominee	David A. Reed	Rachel C. Robinson	William J. Van Essen
Party	Republican	Prohibition	Socialist
Popular vote	860,483	60,390	55,703
Percentage	86.15%	6.05%	5.58%
U.S. senator before election
David A. Reed
Republican
Elected U.S. Senator
David A. Reed
Republican

1922 United States Senate special election in Pennsylvania (Class 1)
Party	Candidate	Votes	%
Republican	David A. Reed (Incumbent)	860,483	86.15%
Prohibition	Rachel C. Robinson	60,390	6.05%
Socialist	William J. Van Essen	55,703	5.58%
Single Tax	Thomas J. Davis	21,997	2.20%
None	Scattering	287	0.03%
Majority		800,093	80.10%
Turnout		998,860	
Republican hold			

=== Pennsylvania (regular) ===
1922 United States Senate election in Pennsylvania
- November 7, 1922
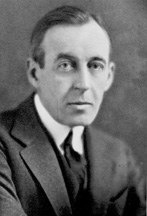

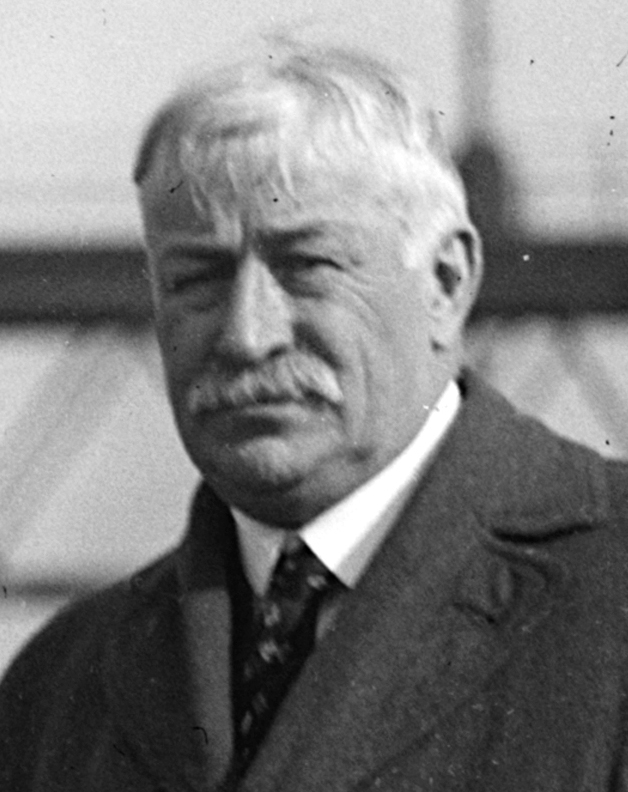
Nominee	David A. Reed	Samuel E. Shull	William J. Burke
Party	Republican	Democratic	Progressive Party (United States, 1924)
Popular vote	802,146	434,583	127,180
Percentage	55.61%	30.13%	8.82%
- County results Reed: 50–60% 60–70% 70–80% 80–90% Shull: 40–50% 50–60% 60–70% 70–80%
U.S. senator before election
David A. Reed
Republican
Elected U.S. Senator
David A. Reed
Republican

1922 United States Senate election in Pennsylvania
Party	Candidate	Votes	%
Republican	David A. Reed (Incumbent)	802,146	55.61%
Democratic	Samuel L. Schull	434,583	30.13%
Progressive	William J. Burke	127,180	8.82%
Prohibition	Rachel C. Robinson	41,935	2.91%
Socialist	Charles Sehl	33,004	2.29%
Single Tax	Charles J. Schoales	3,596	0.25%
None	Scattering	41	0.00%
Majority		367563	25.48%
Turnout		1442485	
Republican hold			

Reed would serve until 1935.

=== Pennsylvania (special, class 3) ===
Five-term Republican Boies Penrose died December 31, 1921, and Republican attorney George W. Pepper was appointed January 9, 1922 to continue the term, pending a special election, which he then won.

1922 United States Senate special election in Pennsylvania
- November 7, 1922
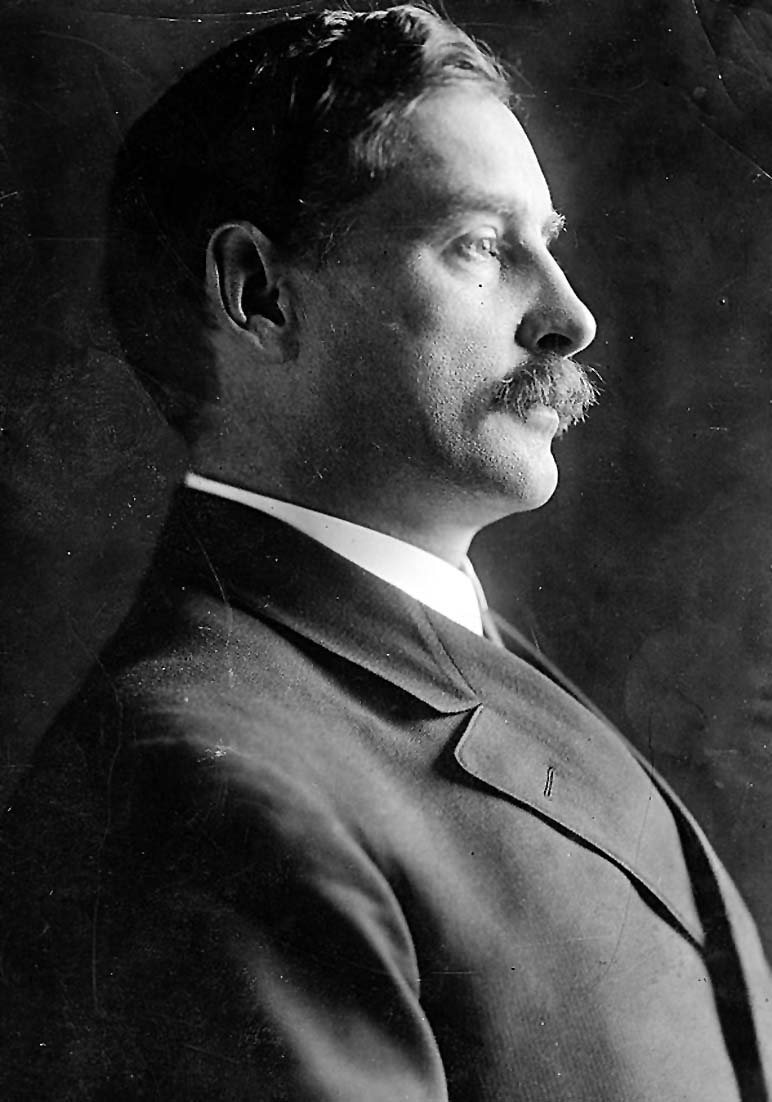

Nominee	George W. Pepper	Fred B. Kerr
Party	Republican	Democratic
Popular vote	819,507	468,330
Percentage	57.60%	32.91%
- County results Pepper: 30–40% 40–50% 50–60% 60–70% 70–80% Kerr: 40–50% 50–60% 60–70%
U.S. senator before election
George W. Pepper
Republican
Elected U.S. Senator
George W. Pepper
Republican

1922 United States Senate special election in Pennsylvania (Class 3)
Party	Candidate	Votes	%
Republican	George W. Pepper (Incumbent)	819,507	57.60%
Democratic	Fred B. Kerr	468,330	32.91%
Progressive	Earl W. Thompson	57,075	4.01%
Socialist	William J. Van Essen	38,440	2.70%
Prohibition	Frank G. Lewis	34,089	2.40%
Single Tax	James A. Robinson	5,356	0.38%
Majority		351,177	24.69%
Turnout		1422856	
Republican hold			

Pepper would only serve out that term, losing renomination in 1926.

== Rhode Island ==
1922 United States Senate election in Rhode Island
- November 7, 1922
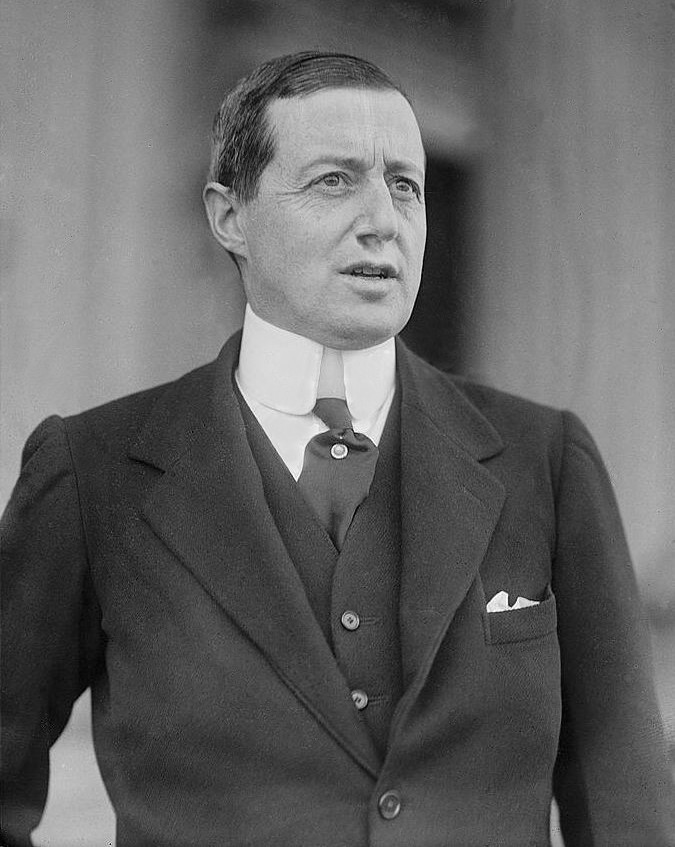

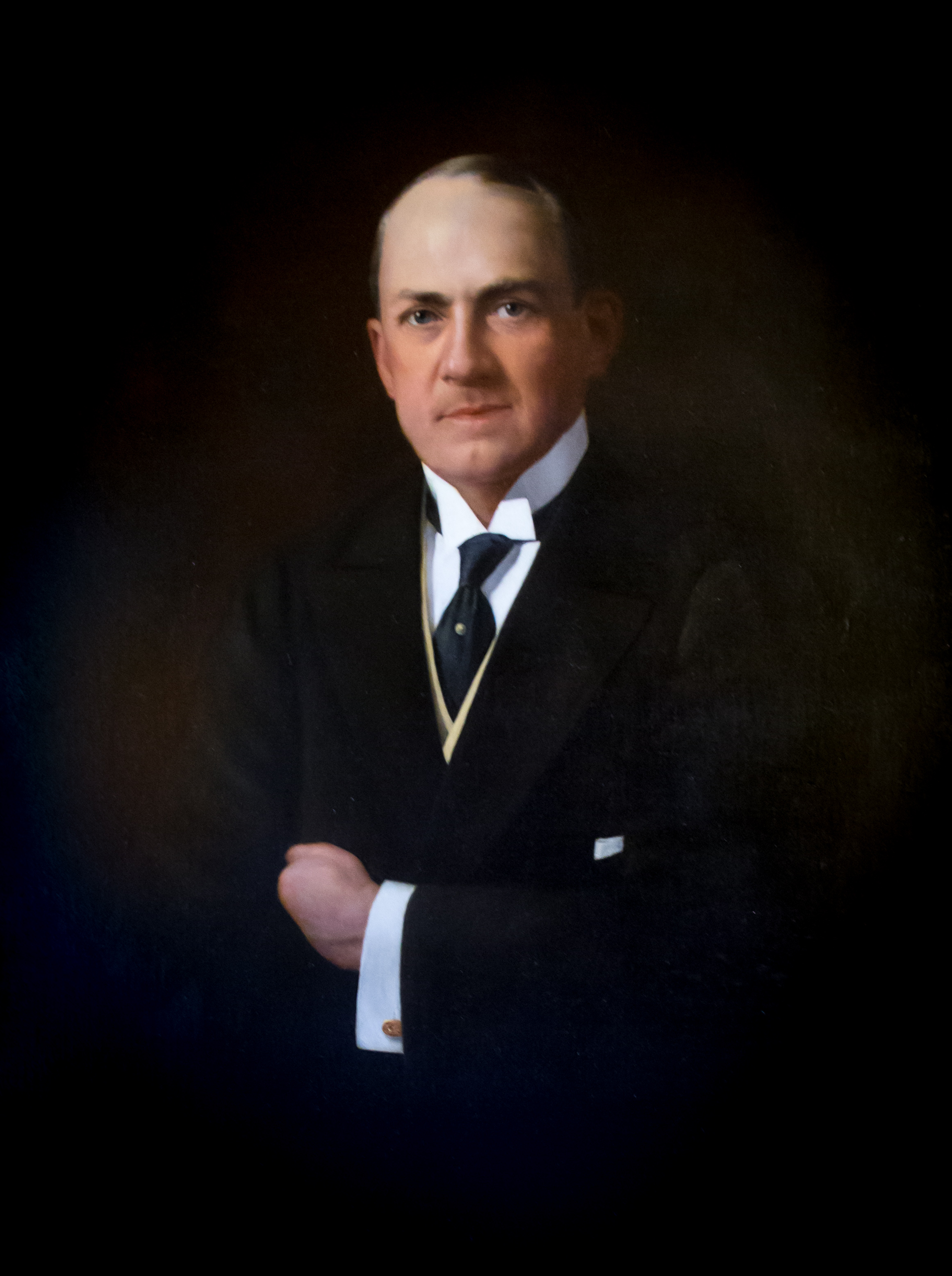
Nominee	Peter G. Gerry	Robert Livingston Beeckman
Party	Democratic	Republican
Popular vote	82,889	68,930
Percentage	52.17%	43.38%
U.S. senator before election
Peter G. Gerry
Democratic
Elected U.S. Senator
Peter G. Gerry
Democratic

1922 United States Senate election in Rhode Island
Party	Candidate	Votes	%
Democratic	Peter G. Gerry (Incumbent)	82,889	52.17%
Republican	Robert Livingston Beeckman	68,930	43.38%
Socialist Labor	James Matthews	6,102	3.84%
Law and Order	James I. Bartholomew	968	0.61%
Majority		13,959	8.79%
Turnout		158,889	
Democratic hold			

== Tennessee ==
1922 United States Senate election in Tennessee
- November 7, 1922
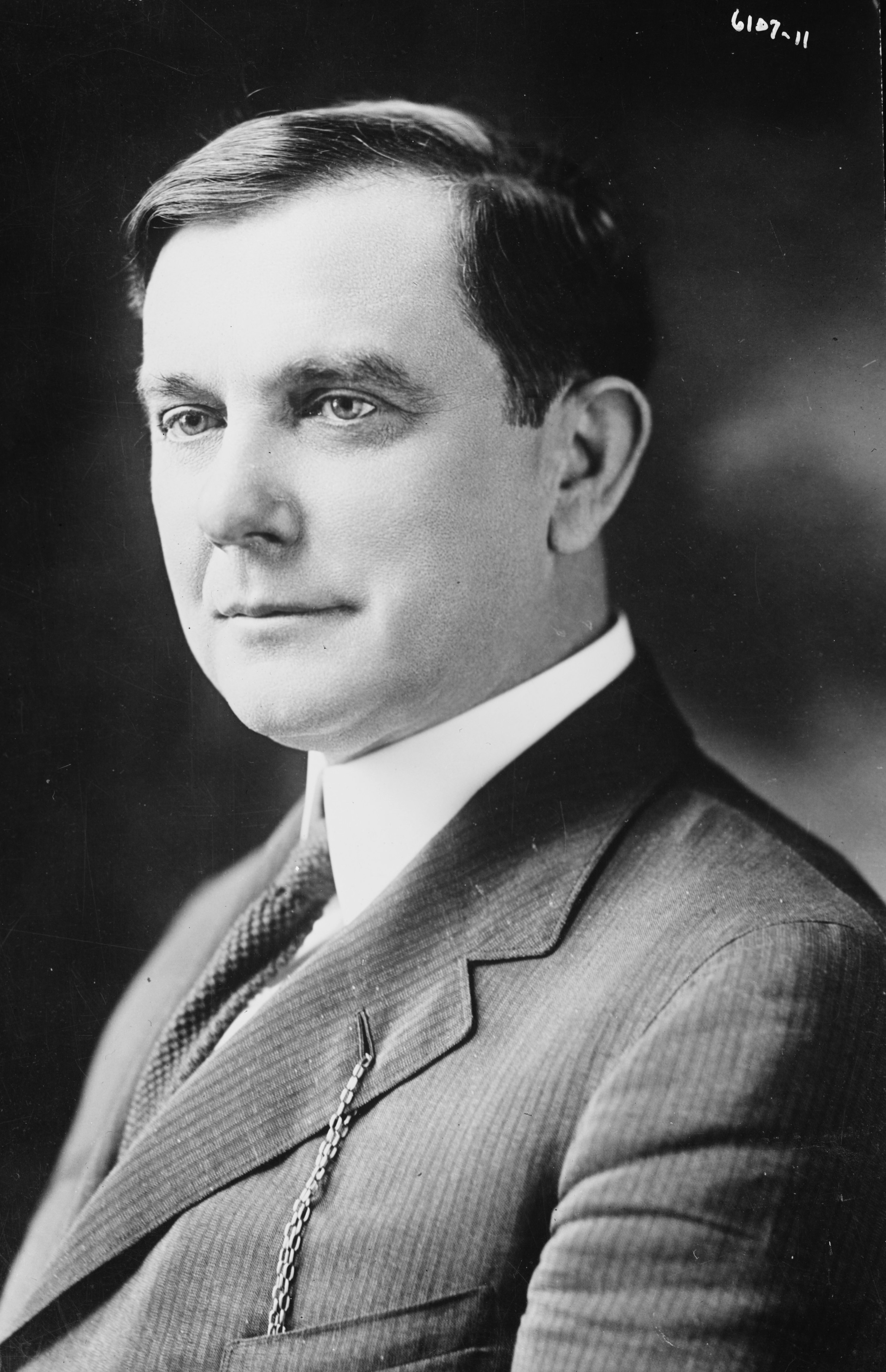

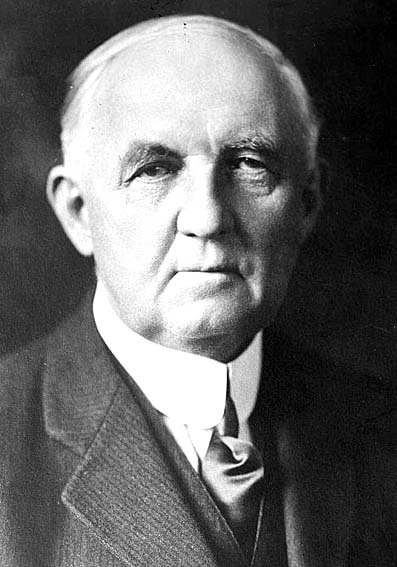
Nominee	Kenneth McKellar	Newell Sanders
Party	Democratic	Republican
Popular vote	151,523	71,199
Percentage	68.03%	31.97%
- McKellar: 50–60% 60–70% 70–80% 80–90% >90% Sanders: 50–60% 60–70% 70–80%
U.S. senator before election
Kenneth McKellar
Democratic
Elected U.S. senator
Kenneth McKellar
Democratic

1922 United States Senate election in Tennessee
Party	Candidate	Votes	%
Democratic	Kenneth D. McKellar (Incumbent)	151,523	68.03%
Republican	Newell Sanders	71,200	31.97%
Majority		80,323	36.06%
Turnout		222723	
Democratic hold			

== Texas ==
1922 United States Senate election in Texas
- November 7, 1922
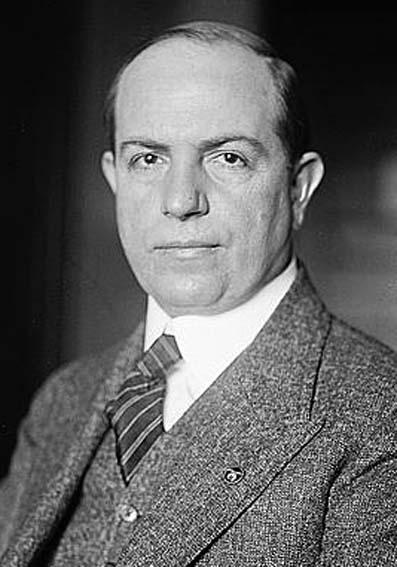

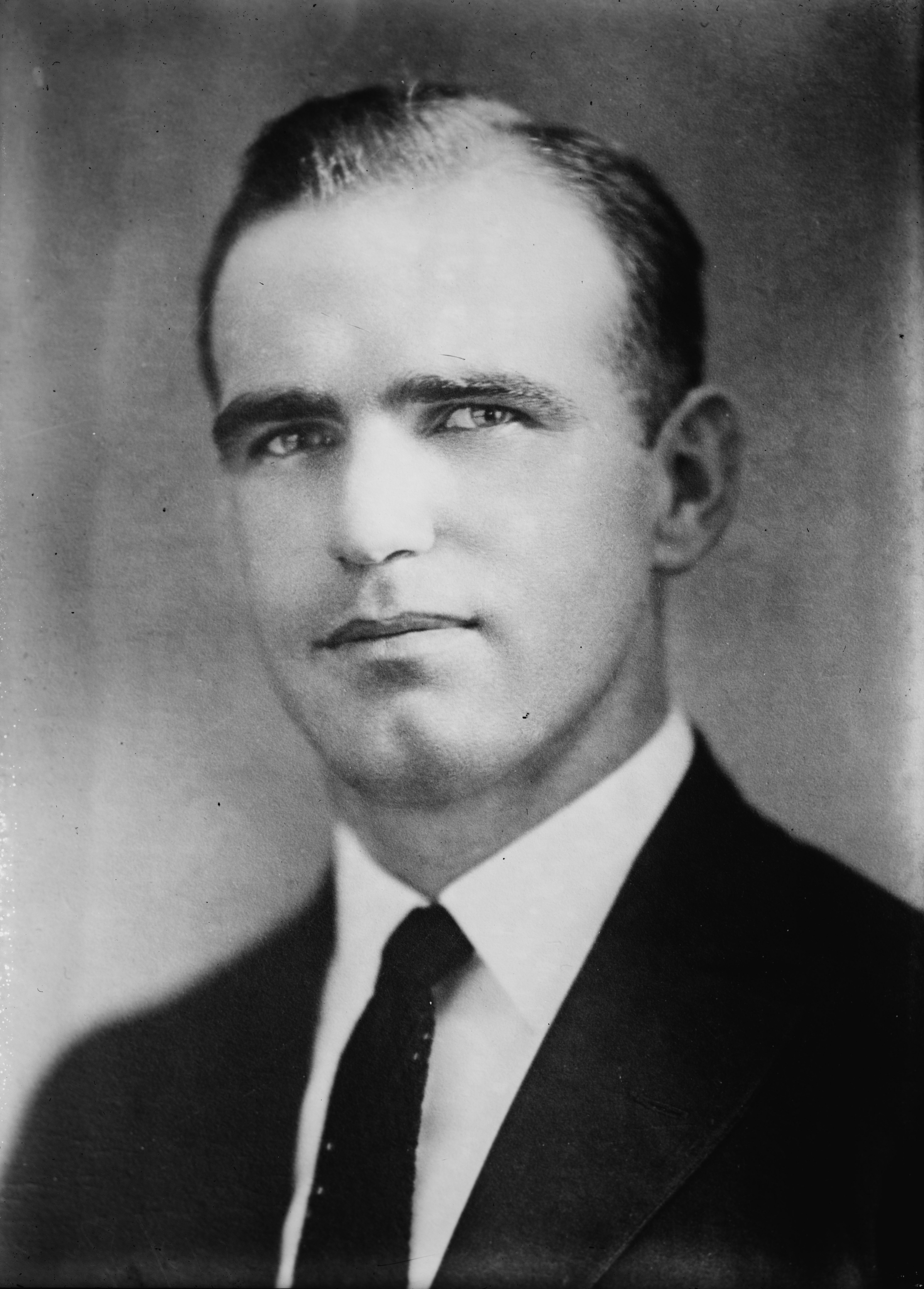
Nominee	Earle Mayfield	George Peddy (write-in)
Party	Democratic	Independent Democratic
Alliance		Republican
Popular vote	264,260	130,744
Percentage	66.90%	33.10%
- County Results Mayfield: 50–60% 60–70% 70–80% 80–90% >90% Peddy: 50–60% 60–70% 70–80% 80–90% No vote
U.S. senator before election
Charles Culberson
Democratic
Elected U.S. Senator
Earle Mayfield
Democratic

Incumbent Democratic U.S. Senator Charles Culberson ran for re-election to a fifth term, but he lost the Democratic primary. Railroads Commissioner Earle Bradford Mayfield defeated former Governor Pa Ferguson in the primary runoff. Mayfield won the runoff, but because of his support of the resurgent Ku Klux Klan, anti-Klan activists in the Democratic Party including George Peddy attempted to have him stripped of the nomination. After this failed, Peddy ran as the candidate of the "Independent Democrats." The Texas Republican Party also backed Peddy, but after a lengthy court battle, they were unable to have him included on the general election ballot as their official nominee. Peddy instead ran as a write-in candidate, but he lost the general election to Mayfield.

1922 United States Senate election in Texas
Party	Candidate	Votes	%
Democratic	Earle Bradford Mayfield	264,260	66.90%
Independent Democratic	George E. B. Peddy (write-in)	130,744	33.10%
Majority		133,516	33.80%
Turnout		395,004	
Democratic hold			

== Utah ==
1922 United States Senate election in Utah
- November 7, 1922
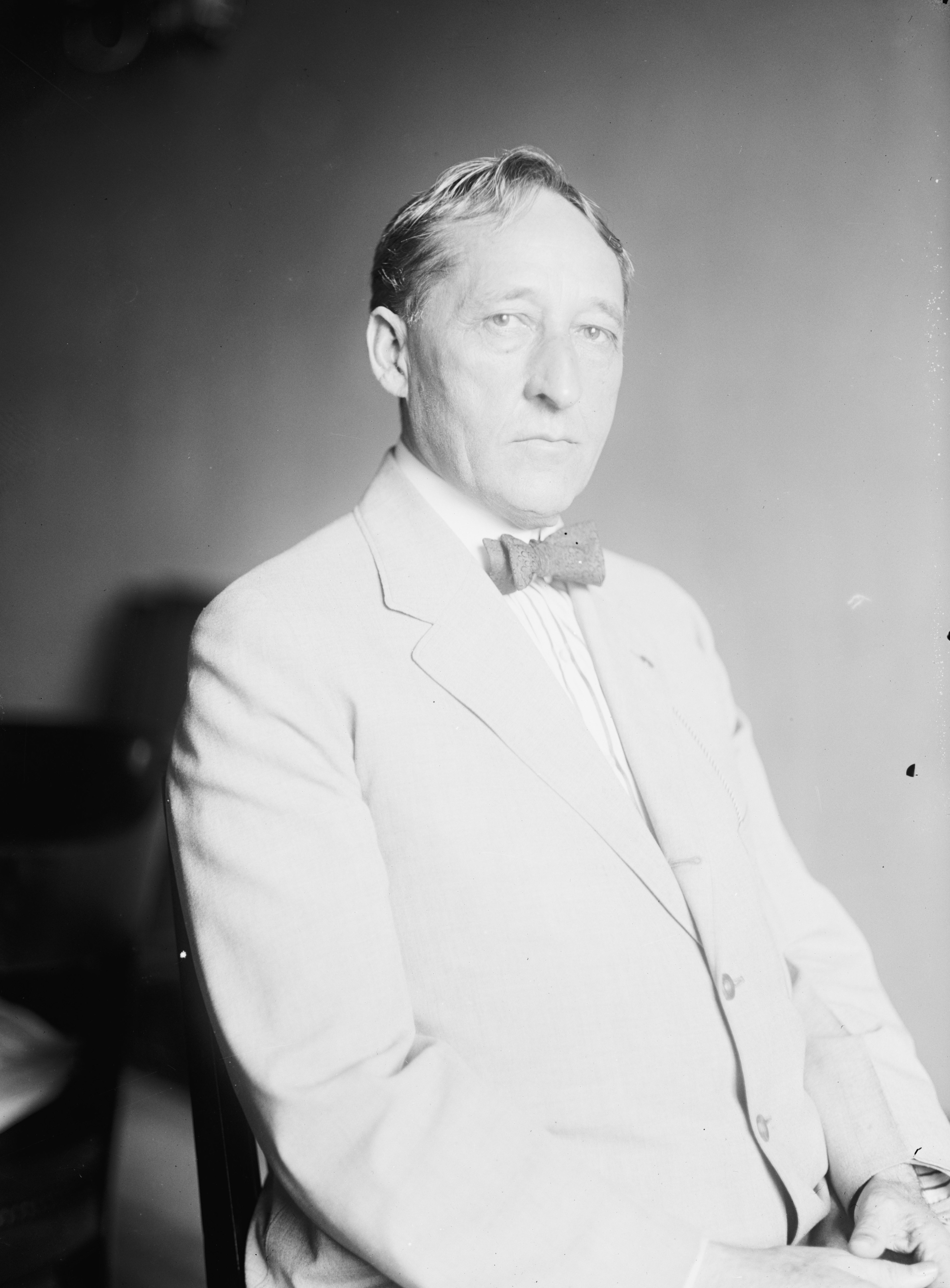

Nominee	William H. King	Ernest Bamberger
Party	Democratic	Republican
Popular vote	58,749	58,188
Percentage	48.63%	48.16%
- County results King: 40–50% 50–60% Bamberger: 50–60% 60–70% 70–80%
U.S. senator before election
William H. King
Democratic
Elected U.S. Senator
William H. King
Democratic

1922 United States Senate election in Utah
Party	Candidate	Votes	%
Democratic	William H. King (Incumbent)	58,749	48.63%
Republican	Ernest Bamberger	58,188	48.16%
Socialist	Charles T. Stoney	3,875	3.21%
Majority		561	0.47%
Turnout		120,812	
Democratic hold			

== Vermont ==
1922 United States Senate election in Vermont
- November 7, 1922
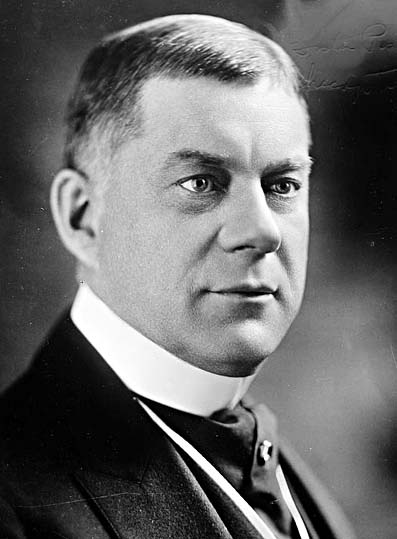

Nominee	Frank L. Greene	William B. Mayo
Party	Republican	Democratic
Popular vote	47,669	21,375
Percentage	69.0%	31.0%
- County results Greene: 50–60% 60–70% 70–80% 80–90% Mayo: 50–60%
U.S. senator before election
Carroll S. Page
Republican
Elected U.S. Senator
Frank L. Greene
Republican

1922 United States Senate election in Vermont
Party	Candidate	Votes	%
Republican	Frank L. Greene	47,669	69.04%
Democratic	William B. Mayo	21,375	30.96%
Majority		26,294	38.08%
Turnout		69,044	
Republican hold			

== Virginia ==
1922 United States Senate election in Virginia
- November 7, 1922
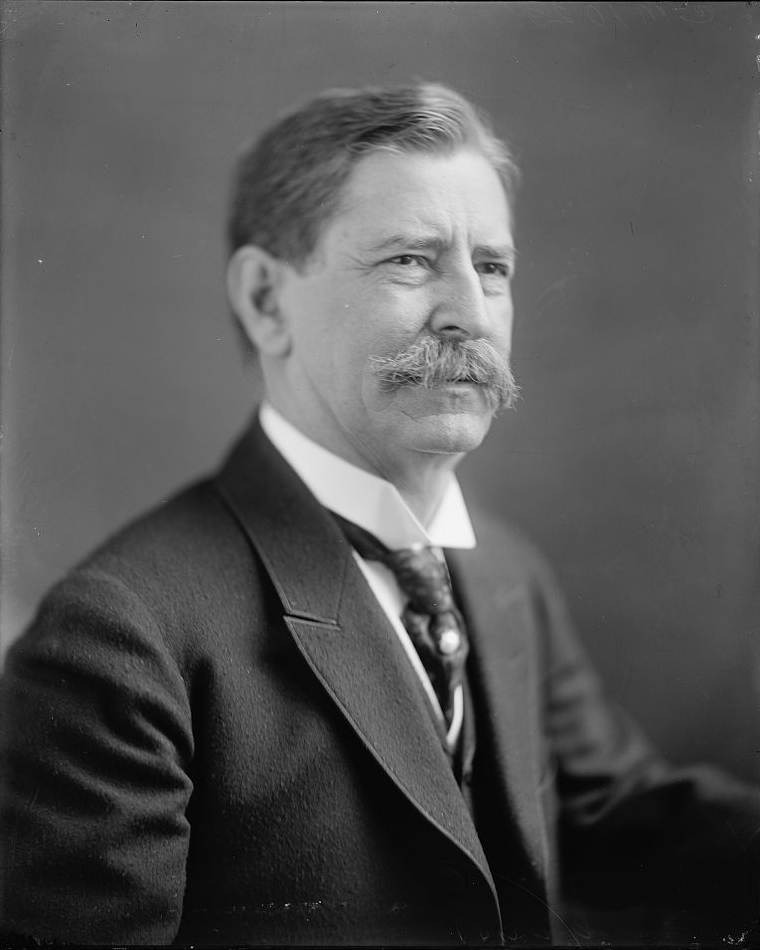

Nominee	Claude A. Swanson	J. W. McGavock
Party	Democratic	Republican
Popular vote	116,393	42,903
Percentage	71.9%	26.5%
U.S. senator before election
Claude A. Swanson
Democratic
Elected U.S. Senator
Claude A. Swanson
Democratic

1922 United States Senate election in Virginia
Party	Candidate	Votes	%
Democratic	Claude A. Swanson (inc.)	116,393	71.88%
Republican	J. W. McGavock	42,903	26.50%
Independent	Matt N. Lewis	2,627	1.62%
Majority		73,490	45.38%
Turnout		161,923	
Democratic hold			

== Washington ==
1922 United States Senate election in Washington
- November 7, 1922
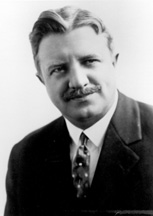

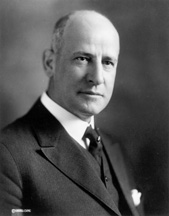

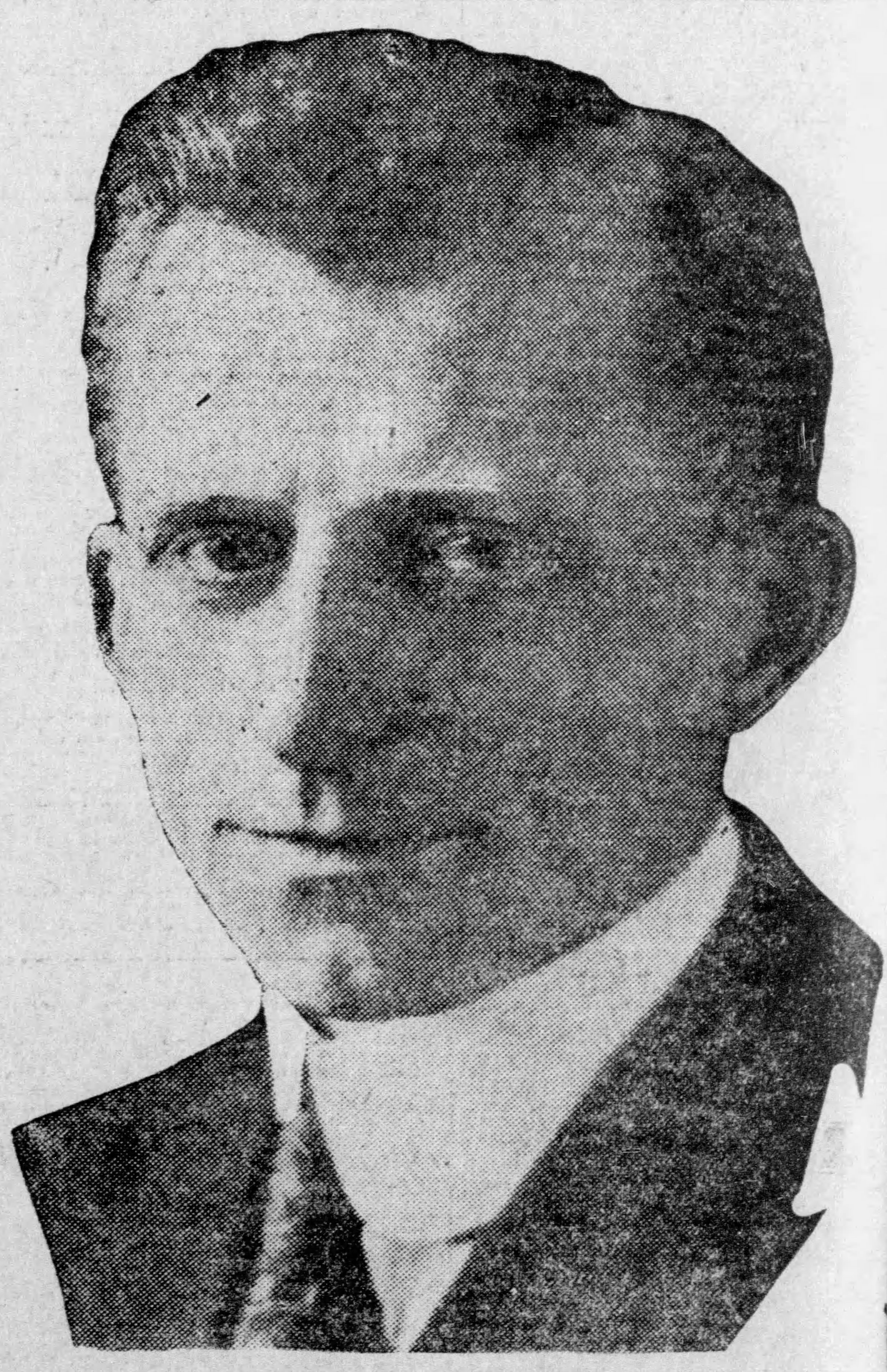
Nominee	Clarence Dill	Miles Poindexter	James A. Duncan
Party	Democratic	Republican	Farmer–Labor
Popular vote	130,347	126,410	35,326
Percentage	44.27%	42.93%	12.00%
- County results Dill: 40–50% 50–60% 60–70% Poindexter: 30–40% 40–50% 50–60% 60–70%
U.S. senator before election
Miles Poindexter
Republican
Elected U.S. Senator
Clarence C. Dill
Democratic

1922 United States Senate election in Washington
Party	Candidate	Votes	%
Democratic	Clarence Dill	130,347	44.27%
Republican	Miles Poindexter (Incumbent)	126,410	42.93%
Farmer–Labor	James A. Duncan	35,326	12.00%
Socialist Labor	David Burgess	1,904	0.65%
Workers	Frans Bostrom	482	0.16%
Majority		3,937	1.34%
Turnout		294,469	
Democratic gain from Republican			

== West Virginia ==
1922 United States Senate election in West Virginia
- November 7, 1922
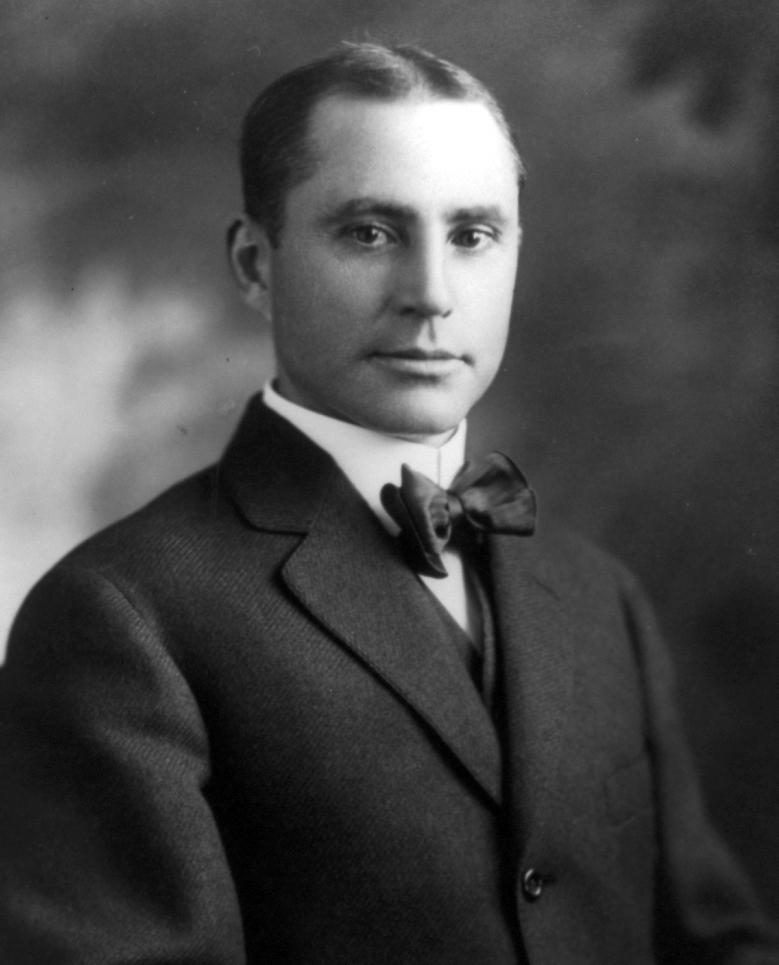

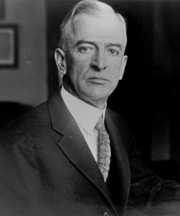
Nominee	Matthew M. Neely	Howard Sutherland
Party	Democratic	Republican
Popular vote	198,853	185,046
Percentage	51.15%	47.59%
- County results Neely: 40–50% 50–60% 60–70% 70–80% Sutherland: 40–50% 50–60% 60–70% 70–80%
U.S. senator before election
Howard Sutherland
Republican
Elected U.S. Senator
Matthew M. Neely
Democratic

1922 United States Senate election in West Virginia
Party	Candidate	Votes	%
Democratic	Matthew M. Neely	198,853	51.15%
Republican	Howard Sutherland (Incumbent)	185,046	47.59%
Socialist	M. S. Holt	4,895	1.26%
Majority		13,807	3.56%
Turnout		388,794	
Democratic gain from Republican			

== Wisconsin ==
1922 United States Senate election in Wisconsin
- November 7, 1922
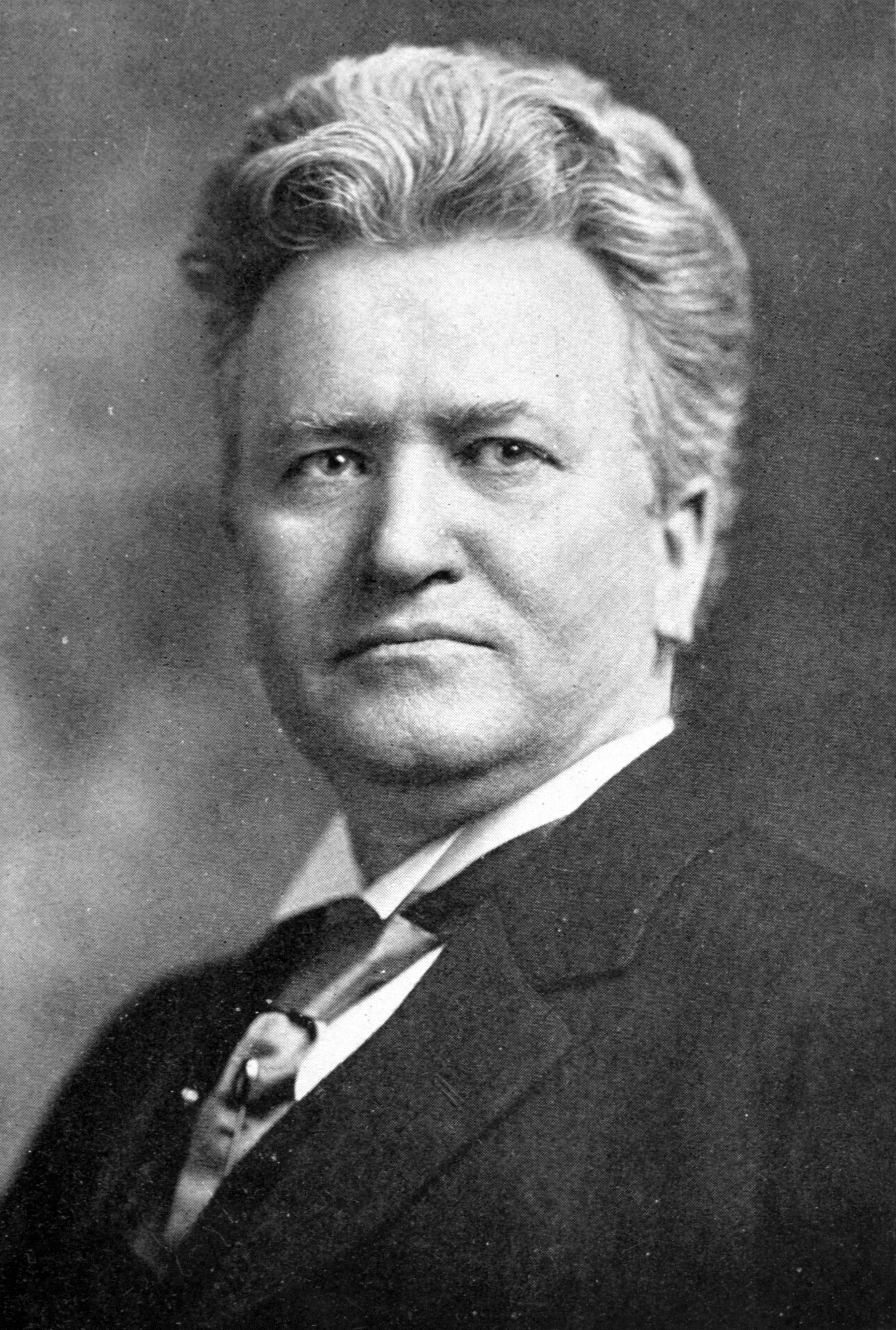

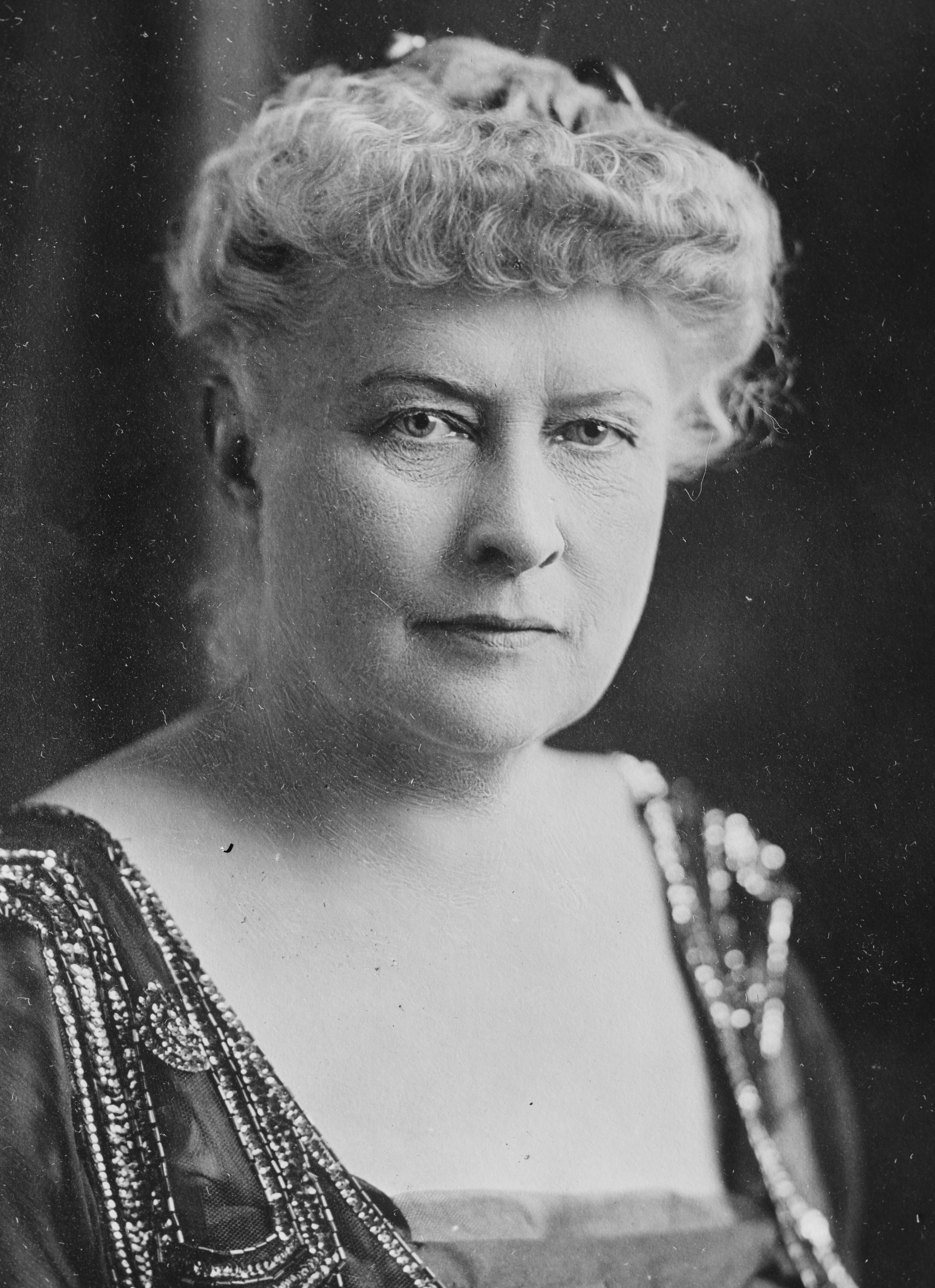
Nominee	Robert M. La Follette	Jessie Jack Hooper
Party	Republican	Democratic
Popular vote	379,494	78,029
Percentage	80.60%	16.57%
- County results La Follette: 60–70% 70–80% 80–90% >90%
U.S. senator before election
Robert M. La Follette
Republican
Elected U.S. Senator
Robert M. La Follette
Republican

1922 United States Senate election in Wisconsin
Party	Candidate	Votes	%
Republican	Robert M. La Follette (Incumbent)	379,494	80.67%
Democratic	Jessie Jack Hooper	78,029	16.59%
Prohibition	Adolph R. Buckman	11,254	2.39%
Independent	Richard Koeppel	1,656	0.35%
Majority		301,465	64.08%
Turnout		470,433	
Republican hold			

== Wyoming ==
1922 United States Senate election in Wyoming
- November 7, 1922
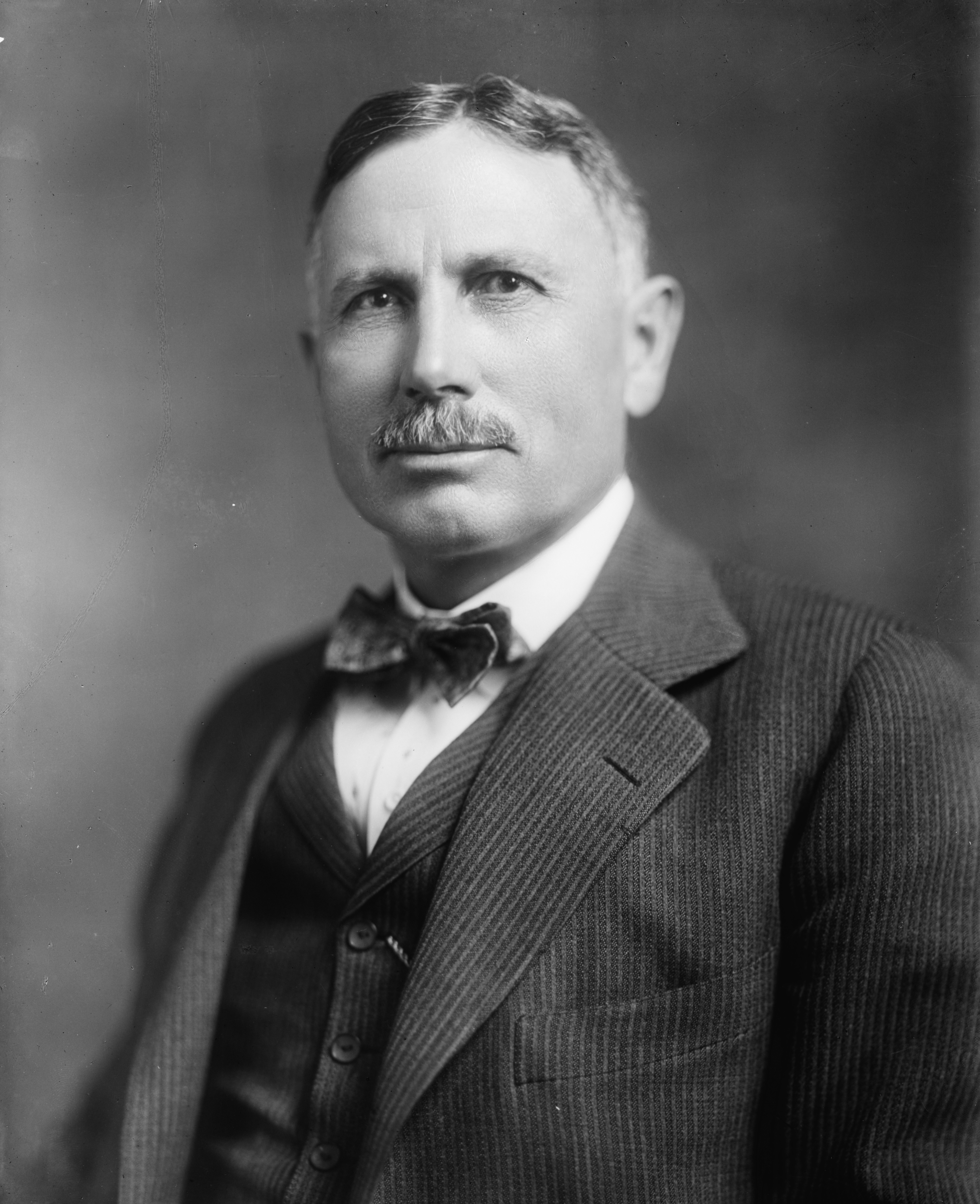

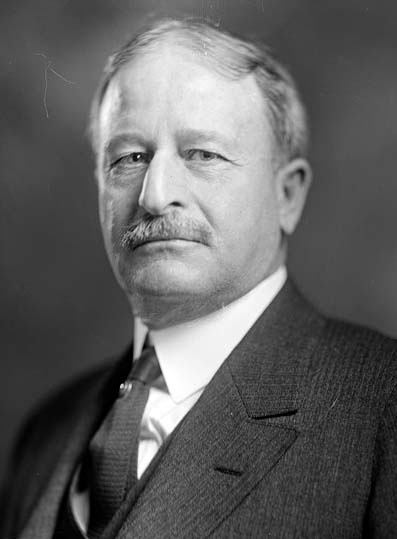
Nominee	John B. Kendrick	Frank Wheeler Mondell
Party	Democratic	Republican
Popular vote	35,734	26,627
Percentage	56.74%	42.28%
- County results Kendrick: 50–60% 60–70% Mondell: 50–60% No Data/Vote

1922 United States Senate election in Wyoming
Party	Candidate	Votes	%
Democratic	John B. Kendrick (Incumbent)	35,734	56.74%
Republican	Frank Wheeler Mondell	26,627	42.28%
Socialist	W. B. Guthrie	612	0.97%
Majority		9,107	14.46%
Turnout		62,973	
Democratic hold			

== See also ==
- 1923 United States Senate elections
- 1922 United States elections
  - 1922 United States House of Representatives elections
- 67th United States Congress
- 68th United States Congress
