= 1934 United States Senate elections =

- November 6, 1934 (Note: There was a regular election September 10 in Maine and a January 16 special election in Vermont.)
- Class 1

36 of the 96 seats in the United States Senate 49 seats needed for a majority
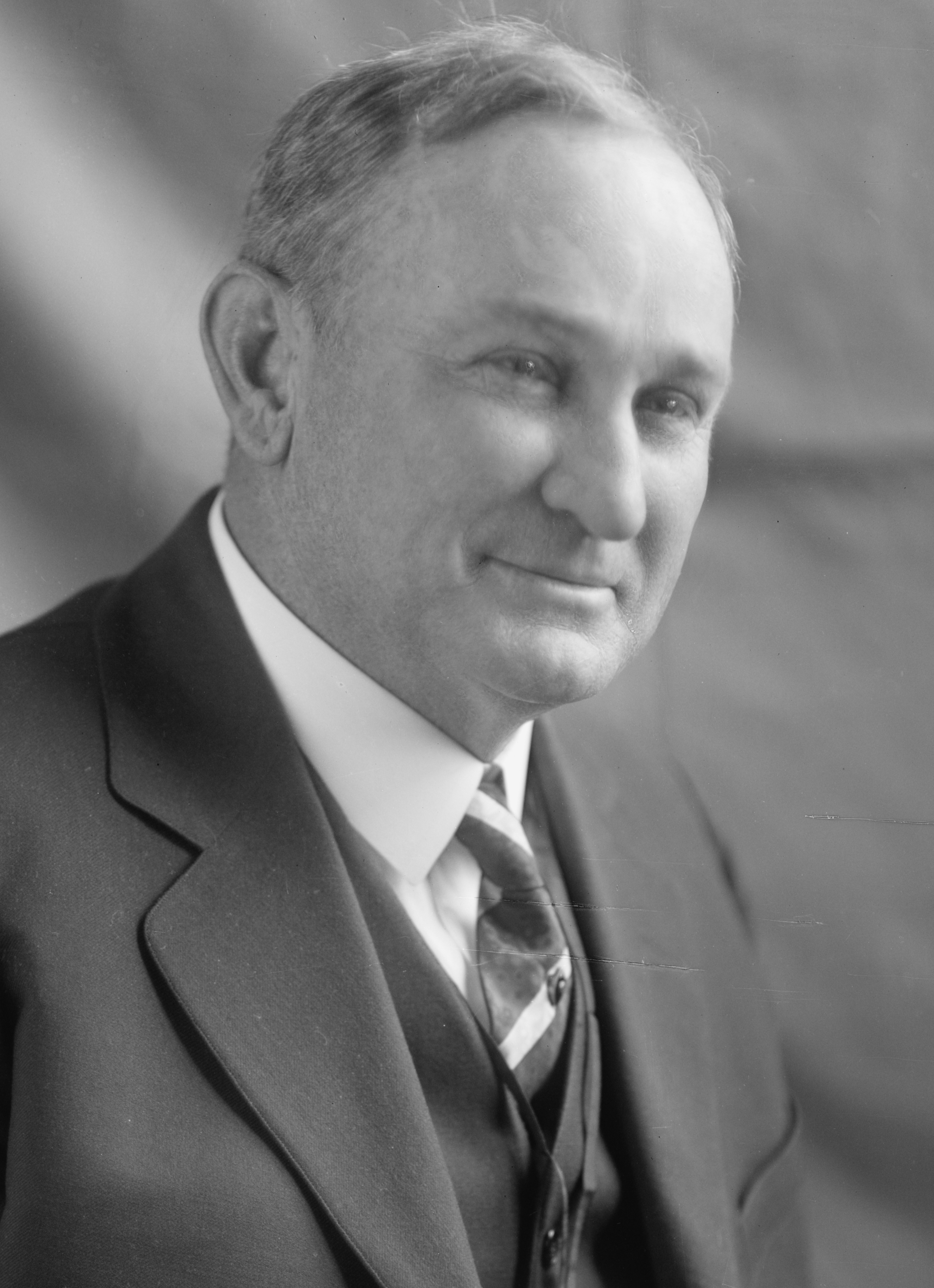

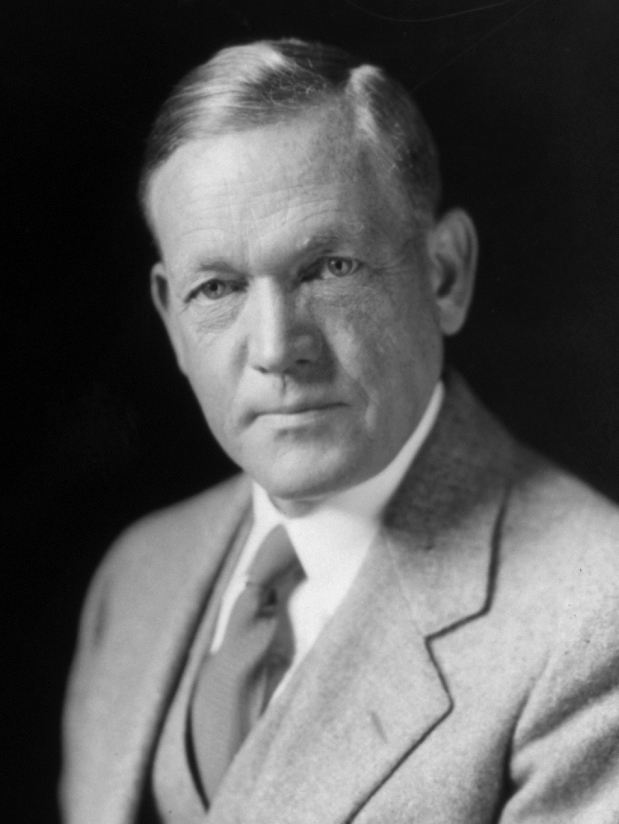
	Majority party	Minority party
Leader	Joseph Robinson	Charles McNary
Party	Democratic	Republican
Leader since	December 3, 1923	March 4, 1933
Leader's seat	Arkansas	Oregon
Seats before	60	35
Seats after	69	25
Seat change	▲9	▼10
Seats up	17	18
Races won	26	8
	Third party	Fourth party
Party	Farmer–Labor	Progressive
Seats before	1	0
Seats after	1	1
Seat change	Steady	▲1
Seats up	1	0
Races won	1	1
- Results of the elections: Democratic gain Democratic hold Republican hold Progressive gain Farmer–Labor hold No election
Majority Leader before election
Joseph Robinson
Democratic
Elected Majority Leader
Joseph Robinson
Democratic

The 1934 United States Senate elections were held in the middle of Democratic President Franklin D. Roosevelt's first term. The 32 seats of Class 1 were contested in regular elections, and special elections were held to fill vacancies. During the Great Depression, voters strongly backed Roosevelt's New Deal and his allies in the Senate, with Democrats picking up a net of nine seats, giving them a supermajority (which required 64 seats, two-thirds of the total 96 seats in 1934). Republicans later lost three more seats due to mid-term vacancies (one to Farmer-Labor and two to Democrats); however, a Democrat in Iowa died and the seat remained vacant until the next election. The Democrats entered the next election with a 70-22-2-1 majority.

This marked the second of three times since the ratification of the 17th Amendment in 1913 that the opposition party failed to flip any Senate seats in a midterm election, alongside 1914 and 2022.

A number of historic figures were first elected to the Senate in 1934, including future president Harry S. Truman, future federal district judge and labor secretary Lewis B. Schwellenbach, and future Supreme Court justice Sherman Minton. This election cycle currently holds the record for the number of defeated non-presidential party incumbents, with eight.

== Gains, losses, and holds ==
=== Retirements ===
Two Democrats and one Republican retired instead of seeking re-election.

State	Senator	Replaced by
Maryland	Phillips Lee Goldsborough	George L. P. Radcliffe
Nebraska (special)	William H. Thompson	Richard C. Hunter
Nebraska	William H. Thompson	Edward R. Burke
Washington	Clarence Dill	Lewis B. Schwellenbach

=== Defeats ===
Eight Republicans and two Democrats sought re-election but lost in the primary or general election.

State	Senator	Replaced by
Connecticut	Frederic C. Walcott	Francis T. Maloney
Indiana	Arthur Raymond Robinson	Sherman Minton
Mississippi	Hubert D. Stephens	Theodore G. Bilbo
Missouri	Roscoe C. Patterson	Harry S. Truman
Montana (special)	John E. Erickson	James E. Murray
New Jersey	Hamilton F. Kean	A. Harry Moore
Ohio	Simeon D. Fess	Vic Donahey
Pennsylvania	David A. Reed	Joseph F. Guffey
Rhode Island	Felix Hebert	Peter G. Gerry
West Virginia	Henry D. Hatfield	Rush Holt Sr.

=== Party switches ===
One Republican won re-election as a Progressive.

State	Senator	Replaced by
Wisconsin	Robert M. La Follette Jr.	Robert M. La Follette Jr.

=== Post-election changes ===
State	Senator	Replaced by
New Mexico	Bronson M. Cutting	Dennis Chavez
Florida (class 1)	Park Trammell	Scott Loftin
Florida (class 1)	Scott Loftin	Charles O. Andrews
Florida (class 3)	Duncan U. Fletcher	William Luther Hill
Florida (class 3)	William Luther Hill	Claude Pepper
Louisiana	Huey Long	Rose McConnell Long
Michigan	James J. Couzens	Prentiss M. Brown
Minnesota	Thomas D. Schall	Elmer Austin Benson

== Change in composition ==
=== Before the elections ===
At the beginning of 1934.

		D_{1}	D_{2}	D_{3}	D_{4}	D_{5}	D_{6}	D_{7}	D_{8}
D_{18}	D_{17}	D_{16}	D_{15}	D_{14}	D_{13}	D_{12}	D_{11}	D_{10}	D_{9}
D_{19}	D_{20}	D_{21}	D_{22}	D_{23}	D_{24}	D_{25}	D_{26}	D_{27}	D_{28}
D_{38}	D_{37}	D_{36}	D_{35}	D_{34}	D_{33}	D_{32}	D_{31}	D_{30}	D_{29}
D_{39}	D_{40}	D_{41}	D_{42}	D_{43}	D_{44} Ariz. Ran	D_{45} Fla. Ran	D_{46} Mass. Ran	D_{47} Miss. Ran	D_{48} Mont. (reg); Ran
Majority →									D_{49} Mont. (sp); Ran
D_{58} Va. Ran	D_{57} Utah; Ran	D_{56} Texas; Ran	D_{55} Tenn. (sp); Ran	D_{54} Tenn. (reg); Ran	D_{53} N.Y. Ran	D_{52} N.M. (sp); Ran	D_{51} Nev. Ran	D_{50} Neb. (reg); Neb. (sp); Retired	D_{49} Mont. (sp); Ran
D_{59} Wash. Retired	D_{60} Wyo. (reg); Wyo. (sp); Ran	FL_{1} Minn. Ran	R_{35} Wis. Ran	R_{34} W.Va. Ran	R_{33} Vt. (reg); Ran	R_{32} R.I. Ran	R_{31} Pa. Ran	R_{30} Ohio; Ran	R_{29} N.Dak. Ran
R_{19} Calif. Ran	R_{20} Conn. Ran	R_{21} Del. Ran	R_{22} Ind. Ran	R_{23} Maine; Ran	R_{24} Md. Ran	R_{25} Mich. Ran	R_{26} Mo. Ran	R_{27} N.J. Ran	R_{28} N.M. (reg); Ran
R_{18} Vt. (sp); Ran	R_{17}	R_{16}	R_{15}	R_{14}	R_{13}	R_{12}	R_{11}	R_{10}	R_{9}
		R_{1}	R_{2}	R_{3}	R_{4}	R_{5}	R_{6}	R_{7}	R_{8}

=== Elections result ===
		D_{1}	D_{2}	D_{3}	D_{4}	D_{5}	D_{6}	D_{7}	D_{8}
D_{18}	D_{17}	D_{16}	D_{15}	D_{14}	D_{13}	D_{12}	D_{11}	D_{10}	D_{9}
D_{19}	D_{20}	D_{21}	D_{22}	D_{23}	D_{24}	D_{25}	D_{26}	D_{27}	D_{28}
D_{38}	D_{37}	D_{36}	D_{35}	D_{34}	D_{33}	D_{32}	D_{31}	D_{30}	D_{29}
D_{39}	D_{40}	D_{41}	D_{42}	D_{43}	D_{44} Ariz. Re-elected	D_{45} Fla. Re-elected	D_{46} Mass. Re-elected	D_{47} Miss. Hold	D_{48} Mont. (reg); Re-elected
Majority →									D_{49} Mont. (sp); Hold
D_{58} Va. Re-elected	D_{57} Utah; Re-elected	D_{56} Texas; Re-elected	D_{55} Tenn. (sp); Elected (Note: Appointee elected)	D_{54} Tenn. (reg); Re-elected	D_{53} N.Y. Re-elected	D_{52} N.M. (sp); Elected	D_{51} Nev. Re-elected	D_{50} Neb. (reg); Neb. (sp); Hold	D_{49} Mont. (sp); Hold
D_{59} Wash. Hold	D_{60} Wyo. (reg); Wyo. (sp); Elected	D_{61} Conn. Gain	D_{62} Ind. Gain	D_{63} Md. Gain	D_{64} Mo. Gain	D_{65} N.J. Gain	D_{66} Ohio; Gain	D_{67} Pa. Gain	D_{68} R.I. Gain
R_{19} Del. Re-elected	R_{20} Maine; Re-elected	R_{21} Mich. Re-elected	R_{22} N.M. (reg); Re-elected	R_{23} N.Dak. Re-elected	R_{24} Vt. (reg); Re-elected	R_{25} Vt. (sp); Elected	P_{1} Wis. Re-elected new party	FL_{1} Minn. Re-elected	D_{69} W.Va. Gain
R_{18} Calif. Re-elected	R_{17}	R_{16}	R_{15}	R_{14}	R_{13}	R_{12}	R_{11}	R_{10}	R_{9}
		R_{1}	R_{2}	R_{3}	R_{4}	R_{5}	R_{6}	R_{7}	R_{8}

Key

D_{#}	Democratic
FL_{#}	Farmer–Labor
P_{#}	Progressive
R_{#}	Republican

== Race summaries ==
=== Elections during the 73rd Congress ===
In these special elections, the winners were seated during 1934; ordered by election date then by state.

State	Incumbent			Results	Candidates
State	Senator	Party	Electoral history	Results	Candidates
Vermont (Class 3)	Ernest W. Gibson	Republican	1933 (Appointed)	Interim appointee elected January 16, 1934.	▌ ✓ Ernest W. Gibson (Republican) 58.2%; ▌Harry W. Witters (Democratic) 41.8%
Montana (Class 2)	John E. Erickson	Democratic	1933 (Appointed)	Interim appointee lost nomination. New senator elected November 6, 1934. Democratic hold.	▌ ✓ James E. Murray (Democratic) 59.6%; ▌Scott Leavitt (Republican) 39.5%
Nebraska (Class 1)	William H. Thompson	Democratic	1933 (Appointed)	Interim appointee retired. New senator elected November 6, 1934. Democratic hold. Winner was not elected to the next term, see below.	▌ ✓ Richard C. Hunter (Democratic) 56.45%; ▌J. H. Kemp (Republican) 43.55%
New Mexico (Class 2)	Carl Hatch	Democratic	1933 (Appointed)	Interim appointee elected November 6, 1934.	▌ ✓ Carl Hatch (Democratic) 54.5%; ▌Richard C. Dillon (Republican) 45.0%
Tennessee (Class 2)	Nathan L. Bachman	Democratic	1933 (Appointed)	Interim appointee elected November 6, 1934.	▌ ✓ Nathan L. Bachman (Democratic) 80.1%; ▌John Randolph Neal Jr. (Independent) 19.9%
Wyoming (Class 1)	Joseph C. O'Mahoney	Democratic	1933 (Appointed)	Interim appointee elected November 6, 1934. Winner was also elected to the next term, see below.	▌ ✓ Joseph C. O'Mahoney (Democratic) 56.88%; ▌Vincent Carter (Republican) 43.12%

=== Elections leading to the 74th Congress ===
In these general elections, the winners were elected for the term beginning January 3, 1935; ordered by state.

All of the elections involved the Class 1 seats.

State	Incumbent			Results	Candidates
State	Senator	Party	Electoral history	Results	Candidates
Arizona	Henry F. Ashurst	Democratic	1912; 1916; 1922; 1928	Incumbent re-elected.	▌ ✓ Henry F. Ashurst (Democratic) 72.0%; ▌J. E. Thompson (Republican) 25.6%
California	Hiram Johnson	Republican	1916; 1922; 1928	Incumbent re-elected.	▌ ✓ Hiram Johnson (Republican) 94.5%; ▌George Ross Kirkpatrick (Socialist) 5.3%
Connecticut	Frederic C. Walcott	Republican	1928	Incumbent lost re-election. New senator elected. Democratic gain.	▌ ✓ Francis T. Maloney (Democratic) 40.41%; ▌Frederic C. Walcott (Republican) 40.14%
Delaware	John G. Townsend Jr.	Republican	1928	Incumbent re-elected.	▌ ✓ John G. Townsend Jr. (Republican) 53.3%; ▌Wilbur L. Adams (Democratic) 46.2%
Florida	Park Trammell	Democratic	1916; 1922; 1928	Incumbent re-elected.	▌ ✓ Park Trammell (Democratic); Unopposed
Indiana	Arthur Raymond Robinson	Republican	1925 (Appointed); 1926 (special); 1928	Incumbent lost re-election. New senator elected. Democratic gain.	▌ ✓ Sherman Minton (Democratic) 51.5%; ▌Arthur Raymond Robinson (Republican) 47.5%
Maine	Frederick Hale	Republican	1916; 1922; 1928	Incumbent re-elected.	▌ ✓ Frederick Hale (Republican) 50.1%; ▌F. Harold Dubord (Democratic) 49.7%
Maryland	Phillips Lee Goldsborough	Republican	1928	Incumbent retired to run for governor of Maryland. New senator elected. Democratic gain.	▌ ✓ George L. P. Radcliffe (Democratic) 56.1%; ▌Joseph I. France (Republican) 42.0%
Massachusetts	David I. Walsh	Democratic	1926 (special); 1928	Incumbent re-elected.	▌ ✓ David I. Walsh (Democratic) 59.4%; ▌Robert M. Washburn (Republican) 37.4%
Michigan	Arthur Vandenberg	Republican	1928 (Appointed); 1928 (special); 1928	Incumbent re-elected.	▌ ✓ Arthur Vandenberg (Republican) 51.3%; ▌Frank Albert Picard (Democratic) 47.0%; ▌John Monarch (Socialist) 1.7%
Minnesota	Henrik Shipstead	Farmer–Labor	1922; 1928	Incumbent re-elected.	▌ ✓ Henrik Shipstead (Farmer–Labor) 49.9%; ▌Einar Hoidale (Democratic) 29.2%; ▌N. J. Holmberg (Republican) 19.8%
Mississippi	Hubert D. Stephens	Democratic	1922; 1928	Incumbent lost renomination. New senator elected. Democratic hold.	▌ ✓ Theodore G. Bilbo (Democratic); Unopposed
Missouri	Roscoe C. Patterson	Republican	1928	Incumbent lost re-election. New senator elected. Democratic gain.	▌ ✓ Harry S. Truman (Democratic) 59.5%; ▌Roscoe C. Patterson (Republican) 39.7%; ▌W. C. Meyer (Socialist) 0.7%
Montana	Burton K. Wheeler	Democratic	1922; 1928	Incumbent re-elected.	▌ ✓ Burton K. Wheeler (Democratic) 70.1%; ▌George M. Bourquin (Republican) 28.7%
Nebraska	William H. Thompson	Democratic	1933 (Appointed)	Incumbent retired. New senator elected. Democratic hold. Winner was not elected to finish the current term; see above.	▌ ✓ Edward R. Burke (Democratic) 55.3%; ▌Robert G. Simmons (Republican) 42.9%
Nevada	Key Pittman	Democratic	1913 (special); 1916; 1922; 1928	Incumbent re-elected.	▌ ✓ Key Pittman (Democratic) 64.5%; ▌George W. Malone (Republican) 33.4%
New Jersey	Hamilton F. Kean	Republican	1928	Incumbent lost re-election. New senator elected. Democratic gain.	▌ ✓ A. Harry Moore (Democratic) 57.9%; ▌Hamilton F. Kean (Republican) 40.9%
New Mexico	Bronson M. Cutting	Republican	1927 (Appointed); 1928 (Retired); 1928	Incumbent re-elected.	▌ ✓ Bronson M. Cutting (Republican) 50.2%; ▌Dennis Chávez (Democratic) 49.4%
New York	Royal S. Copeland	Democratic	1922; 1928	Incumbent re-elected.	▌ ✓ Royal S. Copeland (Democratic) 55.3%; ▌E. Harold Cluett (Republican) 36.9%; ▌Norman Thomas (Socialist) 5.3%
North Dakota	Lynn Frazier	Republican	1922; 1928	Incumbent re-elected.	▌ ✓ Lynn Frazier (Republican) 58.2%; ▌Henry Holt (Democratic) 40.2%
Ohio	Simeon D. Fess	Republican	1922; 1928	Incumbent lost re-election. New senator elected. Democratic gain.	▌ ✓ Vic Donahey (Democratic) 60.0%; ▌Simeon D. Fess (Republican) 39.4%
Pennsylvania	David A. Reed	Republican	1922 (Appointed); 1922 (special); 1922; 1928	Incumbent lost re-election. New senator elected. Democratic gain.	▌ ✓ Joseph F. Guffey (Democratic) 50.8%; ▌David A. Reed (Republican) 46.5%
Rhode Island	Felix Hebert	Republican	1928	Incumbent lost re-election. New senator elected. Democratic gain.	▌ ✓ Peter G. Gerry (Democratic) 57.1%; ▌Felix Hebert (Republican) 42.9%
Tennessee	Kenneth McKellar	Democratic	1916; 1922; 1928	Incumbent re-elected.	▌ ✓ Kenneth McKellar (Democratic) 63.4%; ▌Ben W. Hooper (Republican) 35.8%
Texas	Tom Connally	Democratic	1928	Incumbent re-elected.	▌ ✓ Tom Connally (Democratic) 96.7%
Utah	William H. King	Democratic	1916; 1922; 1928	Incumbent re-elected.	▌ ✓ William H. King (Democratic) 53.1%; ▌Don B. Colton (Republican) 45.4%
Vermont	Warren Austin	Republican	1931 (special)	Incumbent re-elected.	▌ ✓ Warren Austin (Republican) 51.0%; ▌Fred C. Martin (Democratic) 48.4%
Virginia	Harry F. Byrd	Democratic	1933 (Appointed); 1933 (special)	Incumbent re-elected.	▌ ✓ Harry F. Byrd (Democratic) 76.0%; ▌Lawrence C. Page (Republican) 20.9%
Washington	Clarence Dill	Democratic	1922; 1928	Incumbent retired. New senator elected. Democratic hold.	▌ ✓ Lewis B. Schwellenbach (Democratic) 60.9%; ▌Reno Odlin (Republican) 34.0%
West Virginia	Henry D. Hatfield	Republican	1928	Incumbent lost re-election. New senator elected. Democratic gain. Winner was seated late on June 21, 1935, when he turned 30, due to not having satisfied the constitutional requirement to serve.	▌ ✓ Rush Holt Sr. (Democratic) 55.1%; ▌Henry D. Hatfield (Republican) 44.4%
Wisconsin	Robert M. La Follette Jr.	Republican	1925 (special); 1928	Incumbent re-elected as a Progressive. Progressive gain.	▌ ✓ Robert M. La Follette Jr. (Progressive) 47.8%; ▌John M. Callahan (Democratic) 24.2%; ▌John B. Chapple (Republican) 22.8%
Wyoming	Joseph C. O'Mahoney	Democratic	1933 (Appointed)	Interim appointee elected. Winner was also elected to finish the current term; see above.	▌ ✓ Joseph C. O'Mahoney (Democratic) 56.6%; ▌Vincent Carter (Republican) 43.0%

== Closest races ==
Ten races had a margin of victory under 10%:

State	Party of winner	Margin
Maine	Republican	0.4%
New Mexico	Republican	0.8%
Vermont	Republican	2.6%
Connecticut	Democratic (flip)	3.5%
Indiana	Democratic (flip)	4.0%
Michigan	Republican	4.3%
Pennsylvania	Democratic (flip)	4.3%
Utah	Democratic	7.7%
Delaware	Republican	7.1%
New Mexico (special)	Democratic	9.5%

Virginia was the tipping point state with a margin of 55.1%.

== Arizona ==
1934 United States Senate election in Arizona
- November 3, 1934
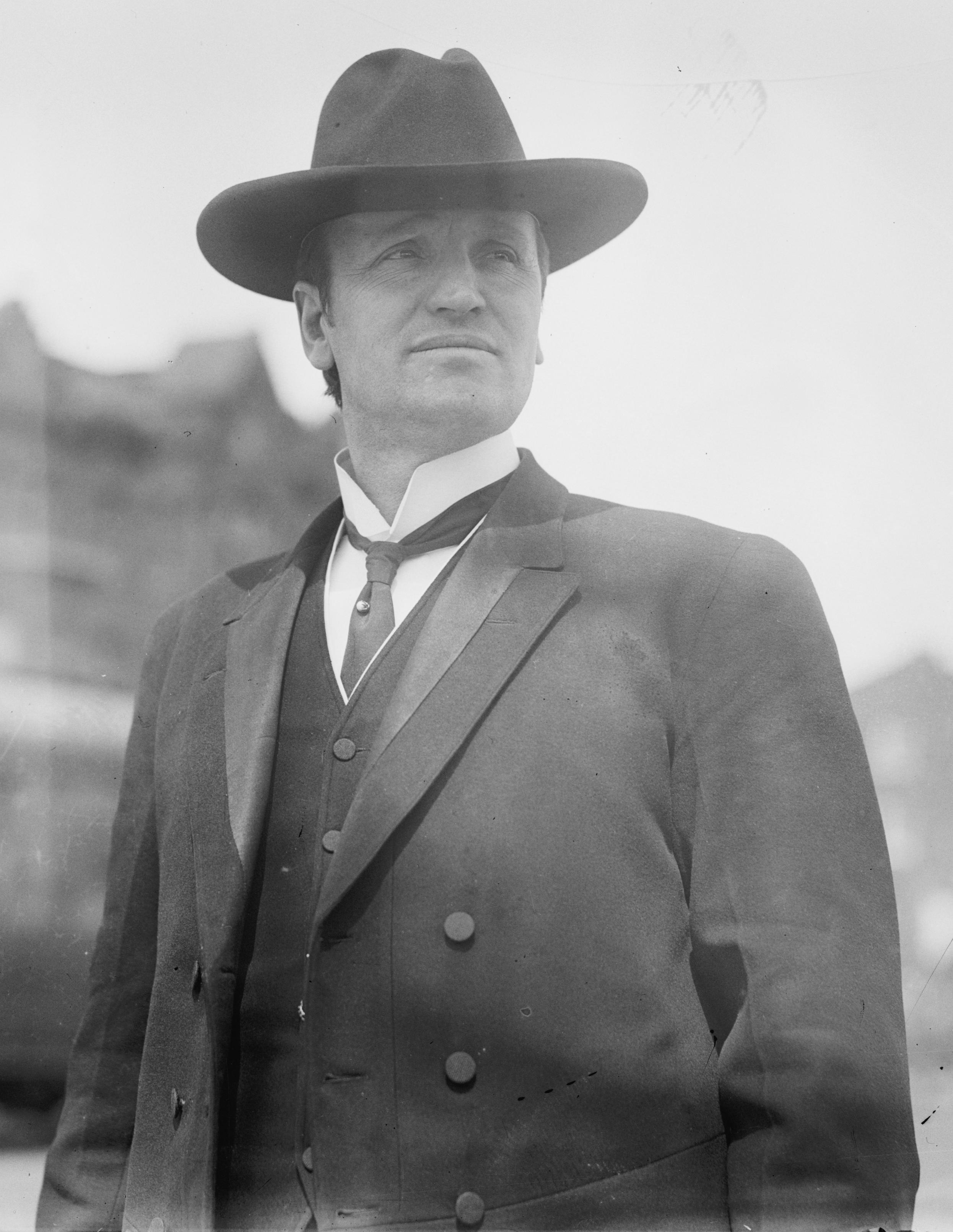

Nominee	Henry F. Ashurst	Joseph Edward Thompson
Party	Democratic	Republican
Popular vote	67,648	24,075
Percentage	72.03%	25.63%
- County results Ashurst: 60–70% 70–80% 80–90%
United States Senator before election
Henry F. Ashurst
Democratic
Elected United States Senator
Henry F. Ashurst
Democratic

1934 United States Senate election in Arizona
Party	Candidate	Votes	%	±%
Democratic	Henry F. Ashurst (incumbent)	67,648	72.03%	
Republican	Joseph Edward Thompson	24,075	25.63%	
Socialist	Charles D. Pinkerton	1,591	1.69%	
Communist	Ramon Garcia	606	0.65%	
Majority		43,573	46.40%	
Turnout		93,920		
Democratic hold				

== California ==
1934 United States Senate election in California
- November 5, 1934
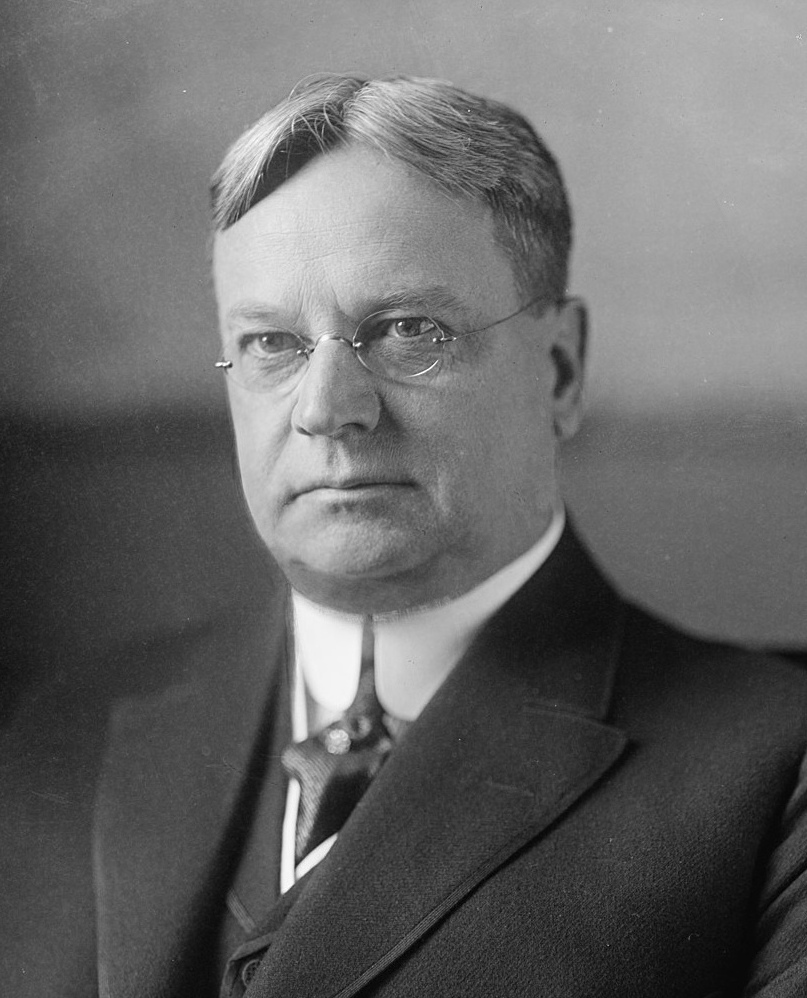

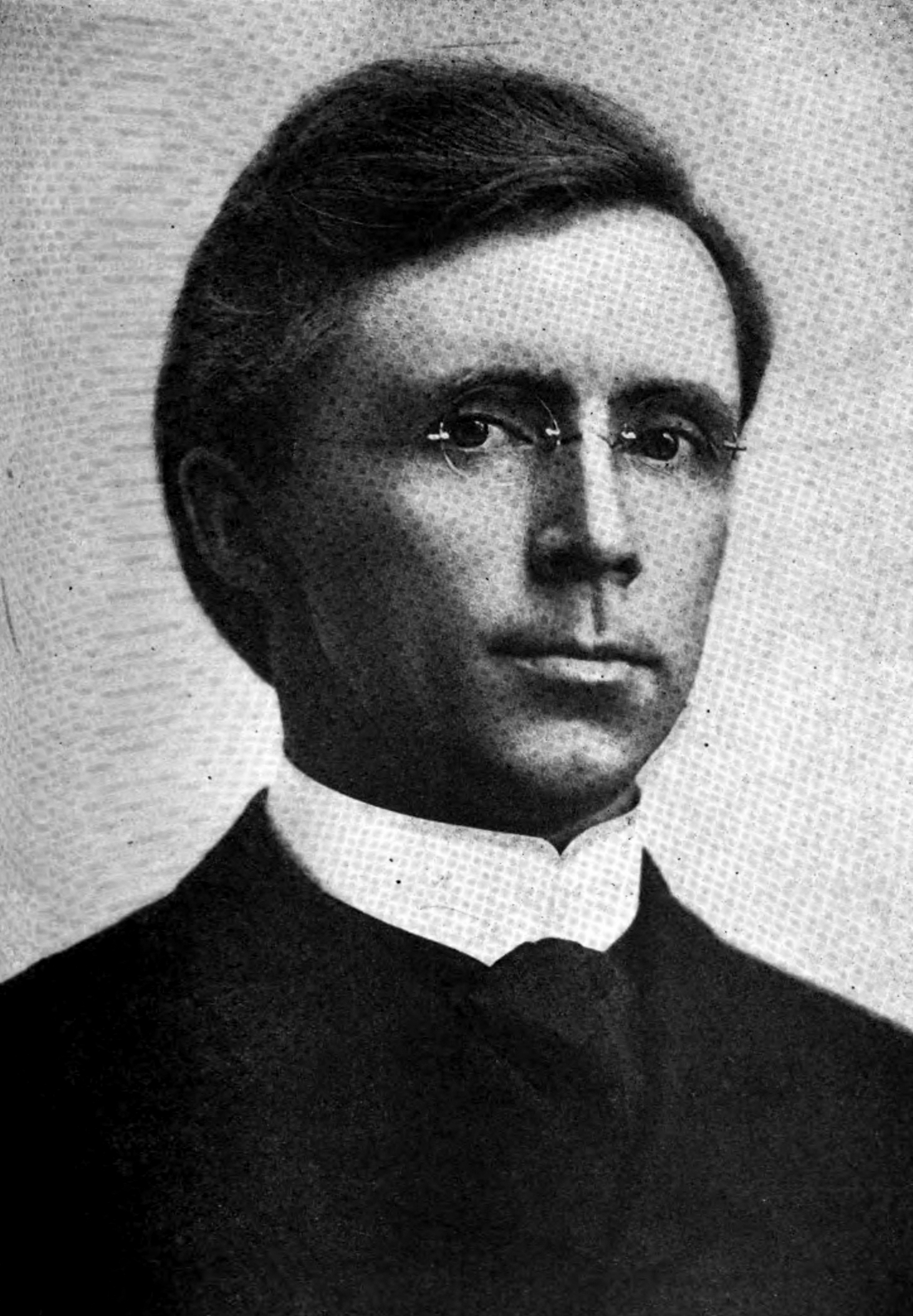
Nominee	Hiram Johnson	George Ross Kirkpatrick
Party	Republican	Socialist
Alliance	Democratic
Popular vote	1,946,572	108,748
Percentage	94.66%	5.29%
- County results Johnson: 90–100%
U.S. senator before election
Hiram Johnson
Republican
Elected U.S. Senator
Hiram Johnson
Republican

1934 United States Senate election in California
Party	Candidate	Votes	%
Republican	Hiram Johnson (incumbent)	1,946,572	94.54%
Socialist	George Ross Kirkpatrick	108,748	5.28%
Write-in	Pat Chambers	1,025	0.05%
None	Scattering	2,595	0.13%
Majority		1,837,824	89.26%
Turnout		2,058,940	
Republican hold			

== Connecticut ==
1934 United States Senate election in Connecticut
- November 6, 1934
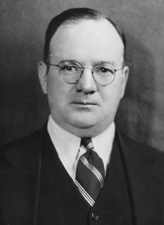

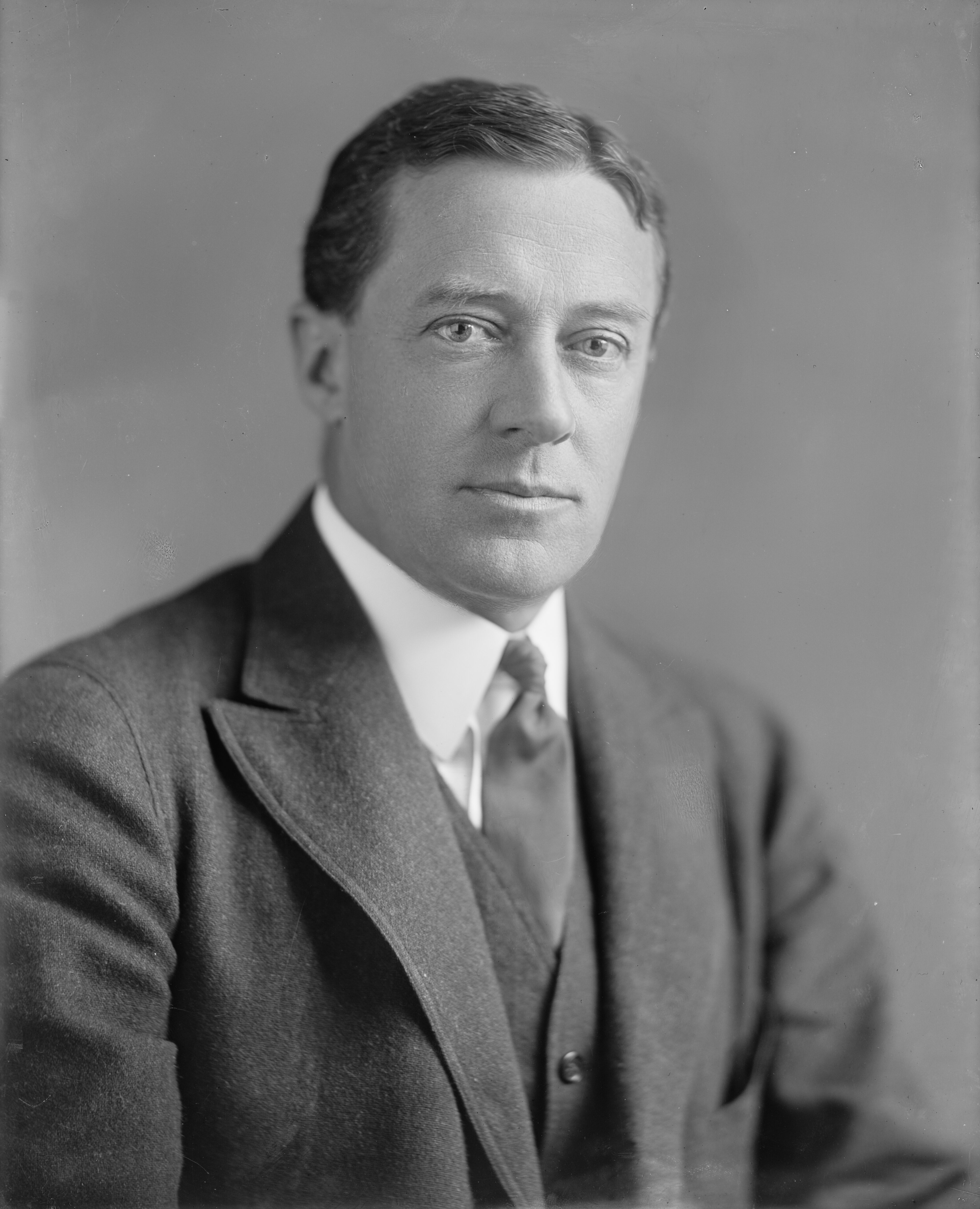
Nominee	Francis T. Maloney	Frederic C. Walcott
Party	Democratic	Republican
Popular vote	265,552	258,313
Percentage	51.75%	48.25%
- Maloney: 50–60% 60–70% Walcott: 50–60% 60–70% 70–80% 80–90%
U.S. senator before election
Frederic C. Walcott
Republican
Elected U.S. Senator
Francis T. Maloney
Democratic

1934 United States Senate election in Connecticut
Party	Candidate	Votes	%	±%
Democratic	Francis T. Maloney	265,552	51.75%	
Republican	Frederic C. Walcott (incumbent)	247,623	48.25%	
Majority		17,929	3.50%	
Turnout		513,175		
Democratic gain from Republican				

== Delaware ==
1934 United States Senate election in Delaware
- November 6, 1934
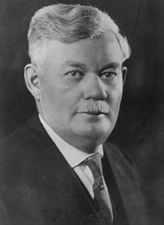

Nominee	John G. Townsend Jr.	Wilbur L. Adams
Party	Republican	Democratic
Popular vote	52,829	45,771
Percentage	53.27%	46.16%
- County results Townsend: 50–60% Adams: 50–60%
U.S. senator before election
John G. Townsend Jr.
Republican
Elected U.S. Senator
John G. Townsend Jr.
Republican

1934 United States Senate election in Delaware
Party	Candidate	Votes	%
Republican	John G. Townsend Jr. (incumbent)	52,829	53.27%
Democratic	Wilbur L. Adams	45,771	46.16%
Socialist	Fred W. Whiteside	497	0.50%
Communist	John T. Wlodkoski	69	0.07%
Majority		7,058	7.11%
Turnout		99,166	
Republican hold			

== Florida ==
1934 Florida United States Senate Democratic primary
- June 26, 1934
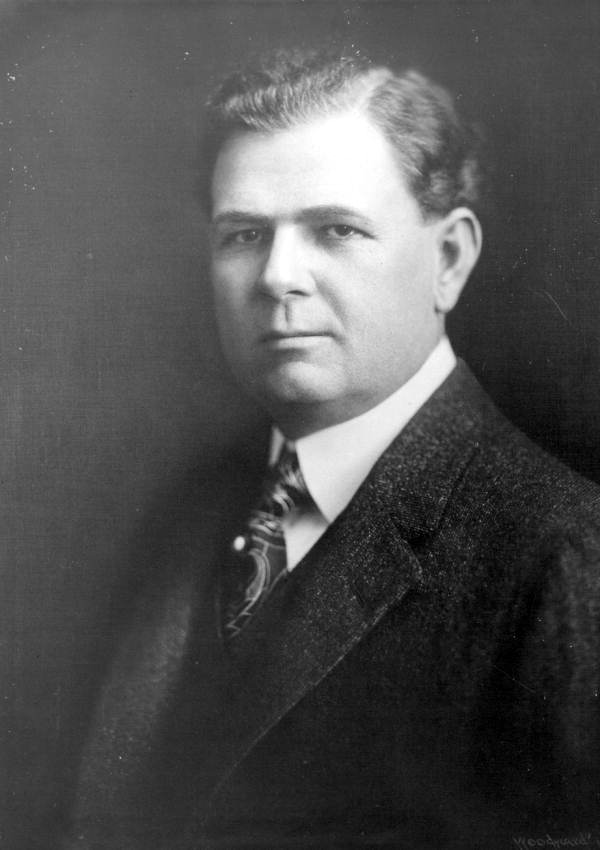

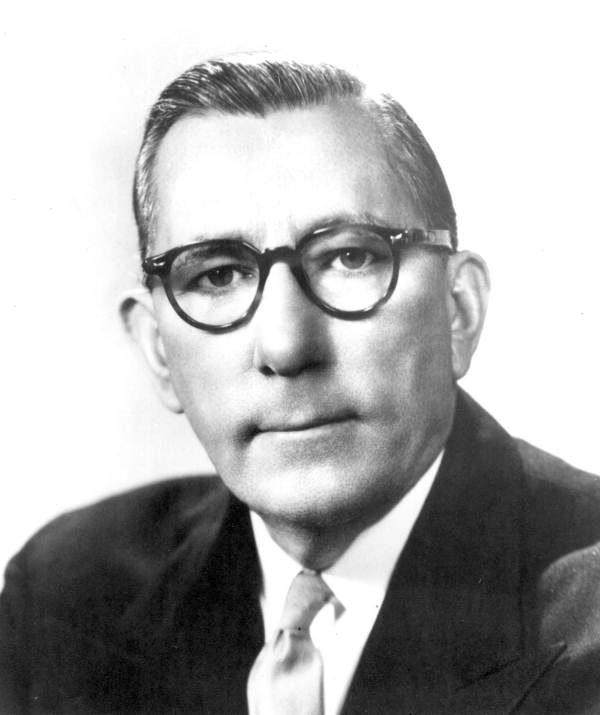
Nominee	Park Trammell	Claude Pepper
Party	Democratic	Democratic
Popular vote	103,028	98,978
Percentage	51.00%	49.00%
- Primary county results Trammell: 50–60% 60–70% 70–80% Pepper: 50–60% 60–70% 70–80% 80–90%
U.S. senator before election
Park Trammell
Democratic
Elected U.S. Senator
Park Trammell
Democratic

1934 United States Senate election in Florida
Party	Candidate	Votes	%
Democratic	Park Trammell (incumbent)	131,780	100.00%
Democratic hold			

== Indiana ==
1934 United States Senate election in Indiana
- November 6, 1934
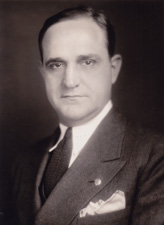

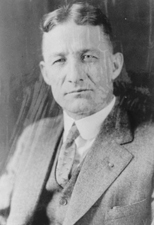
Nominee	Sherman Minton	Arthur Robinson
Party	Democratic	Republican
Popular vote	758,801	700,103
Percentage	51.46%	47.48%
- County results Minton: 40–50% 50–60% 60–70% Robinson: 40–50% 50–60%
U.S. senator before election
Arthur Raymond Robinson
Republican
Elected U.S. Senator
Sherman Minton
Democratic

1934 United States Senate election in Indiana
Party	Candidate	Votes	%
Democratic	Sherman Minton	758,801	51.46%
Republican	Arthur Raymond Robinson (incumbent)	700,103	47.48%
Socialist	Forrest Wallace	9,414	0.64%
Prohibition	Albert Jackman	4,987	0.34%
Communist	Wenzel Stocker	1,307	0.09%
Majority		58,698	3.98%
Turnout		1,474,612	
Democratic gain from Republican			

== Maine ==
1934 United States Senate election in Maine
- September 10, 1934
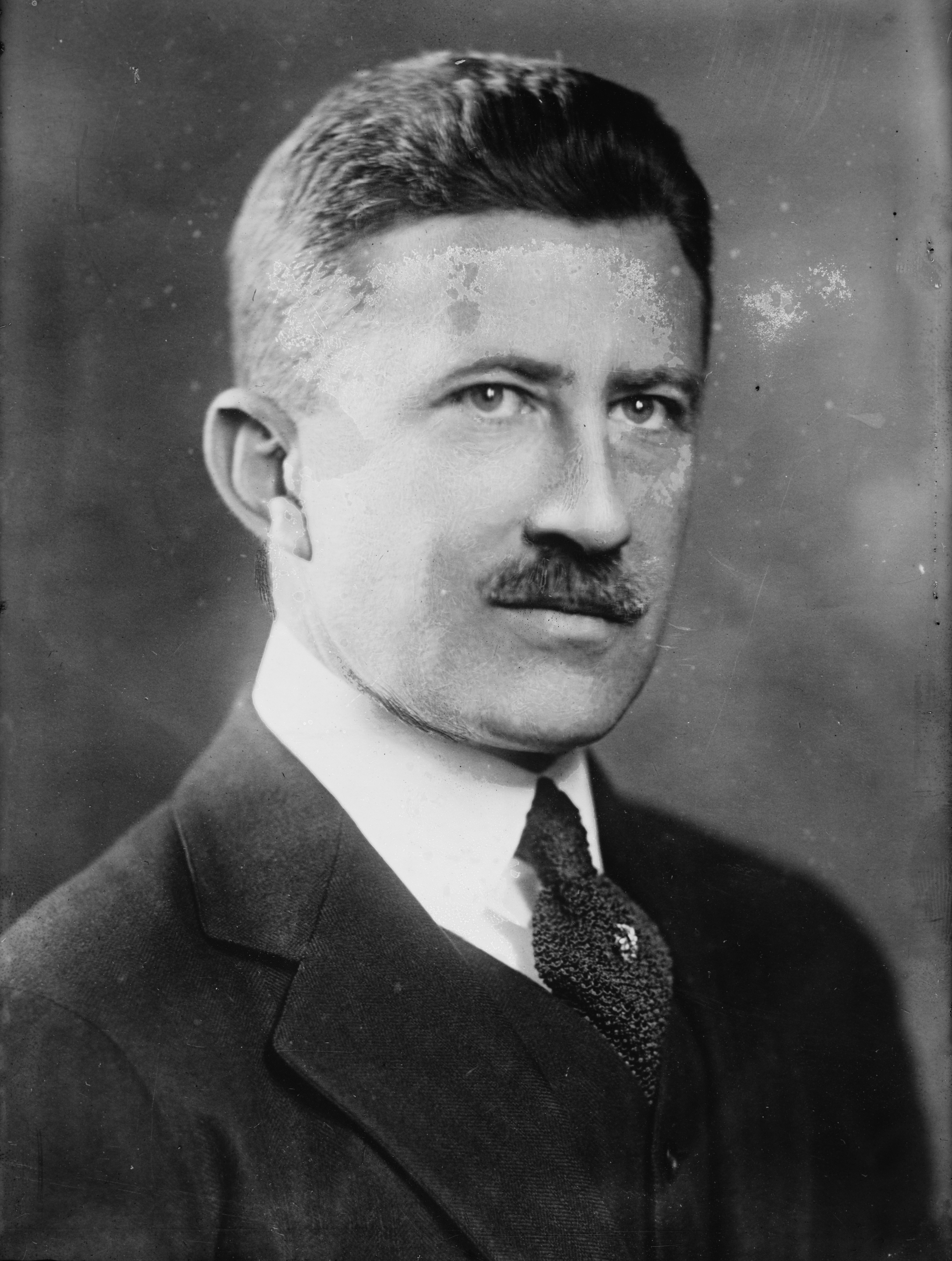

Nominee	Frederick Hale	Harold Dubord
Party	Republican	Democratic
Popular vote	139,773	138,573
Percentage	50.14%	49.71%
- County results Hale: 50–60% 60–70% Dubord: 50–60% 60–70%
U.S. senator before election
Frederick Hale
Republican
Elected U.S. Senator
Frederick Hale
Republican

1934 United States Senate election in Maine
Party	Candidate	Votes	%
Republican	Frederick Hale (incumbent)	139,773	50.14%
Democratic	F. Harold Dubord	138,573	49.71%
Communist	Hans Nelson	422	0.15%
Majority		1,200	0.43%
Turnout		278,768	
Republican hold			

== Maryland ==
1934 United States Senate election in Maryland
- November 5, 1934
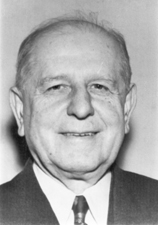

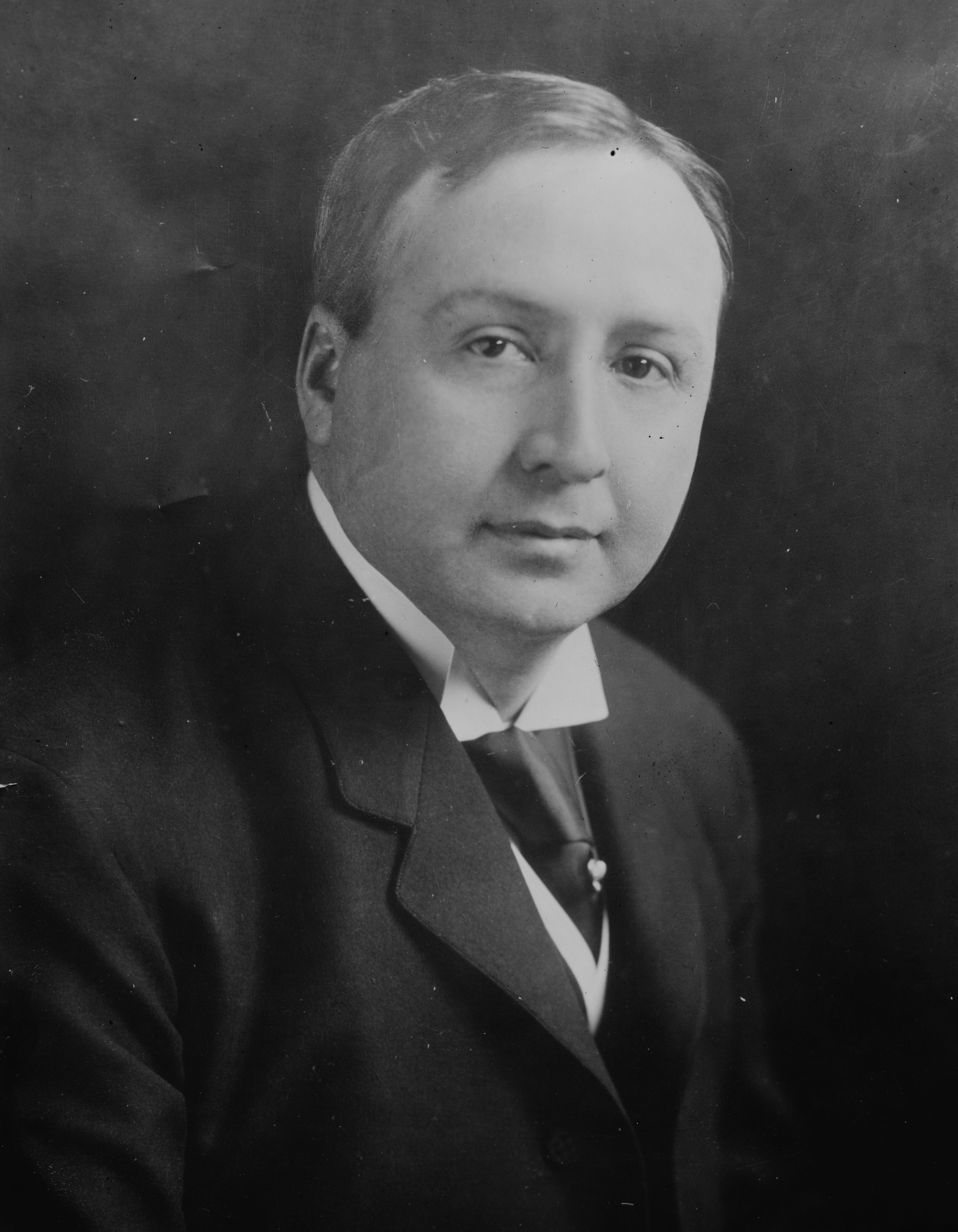
Nominee	George L. P. Radcliffe	Joseph I. France
Party	Democratic	Republican
Popular vote	264,279	197,643
Percentage	56.10%	41.95%
- County results France: 40–50% 50–60% 60–70% Radcliffe: 40–50% 50–60% 60–70%
U.S. senator before election
Phillips Lee Goldsborough
Republican
Elected U.S. Senator
George L. P. Radcliffe
Democratic

1934 United States Senate election in Maryland
Party	Candidate	Votes	%
Democratic	George L. P. Radcliffe	264,279	56.10%
Republican	Joseph I. France	197,643	41.95%
Socialist	Elisabeth Gilman	6,067	1.29%
American Labor	Ada Smith Lang	1,935	0.41%
Communist	Samuel Gale	1,188	0.25%
Majority		66,636	14.15%
Turnout		471,112	
Democratic gain from Republican			

== Massachusetts ==
1934 United States Senate election in Massachusetts
- November 6, 1934
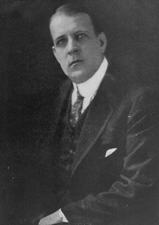

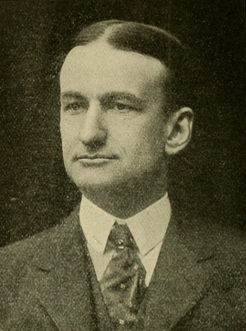
Nominee	David I. Walsh	Robert M. Washburn
Party	Democratic	Republican
Popular vote	852,776	536,692
Percentage	59.39%	37.38%
- Map key Walsh: 40–50% 50–60% 60–70% 70–80% Washburn: 50–60% 60–70%
Senator before election
David I. Walsh
Democratic
Elected Senator
David I. Walsh
Democratic

1934 United States Senate election in Massachusetts
Party	Candidate	Votes	%
Democratic	David I. Walsh (incumbent)	852,776	59.39%
Republican	Robert M. Washburn	536,692	37.38%
Socialist	Albert Sprague Coolidge	22,092	1.54%
Prohibition	Barnard Smith	10,363	0.72%
Socialist Labor	Albert L. Waterman	8,245	0.57%
Communist	Paul C. Wicks	5,757	0.40%
Majority		316,084	22.01%
Turnout		1,435,932	
Democratic hold			

== Michigan ==
1934 United States Senate election in Michigan
- November 6, 1934
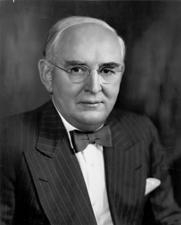

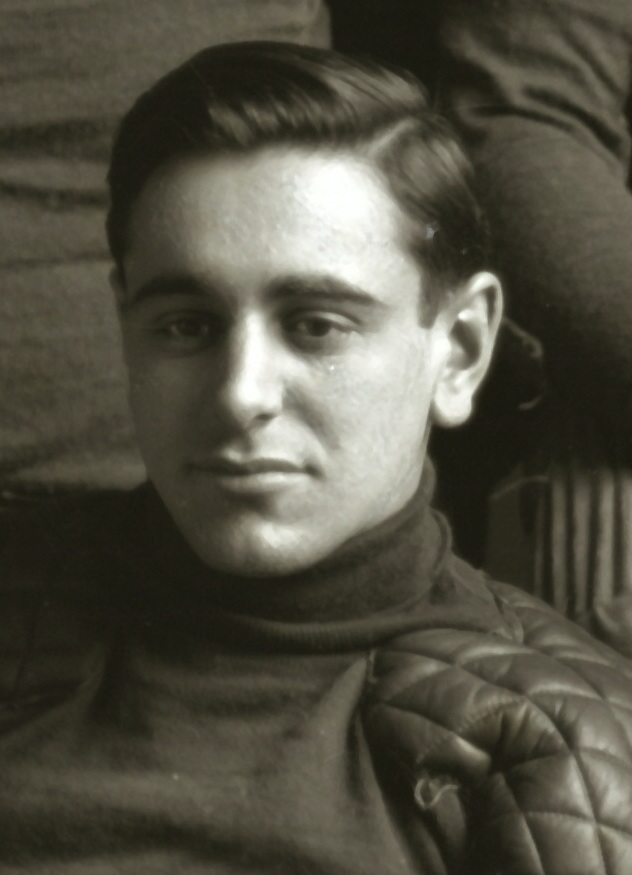
Nominee	Arthur Vandenberg	Frank Picard
Party	Republican	Democratic
Popular vote	626,017	573,574
Percentage	51.32%	47.03%
- County results Vandenberg: 40–50% 50–60% 60–70% Picard: 40–50% 50–60% 60–70%
U.S. senator before election
Arthur Vandenberg
Republican
Elected U.S. Senator
Arthur Vandenberg
Republican

1934 United States Senate election in Michigan
Party	Candidate	Votes	%
Republican	Arthur Vandenberg (incumbent)	626,017	51.32%
Democratic	Frank Albert Picard	573,574	47.02%
Socialist	John Monarch	10,644	0.87%
Communist	Philip Raymond	5,634	0.46%
Farmer–Labor	W. Ralph Jones	2,042	0.17%
Socialist Labor	John Vonica	939	0.08%
Commonwealth Land	Jay W. Slaughter	735	0.06%
National	Chester A. Shewalter	147	0.01%
None	Scattering	2	0.00%
Majority		52,443	4.30%
Turnout		1,219,734	
Republican hold			

== Minnesota ==
1934 United States Senate election in Minnesota
- November 6, 1934
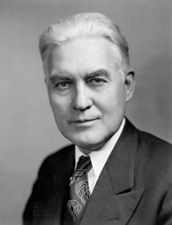

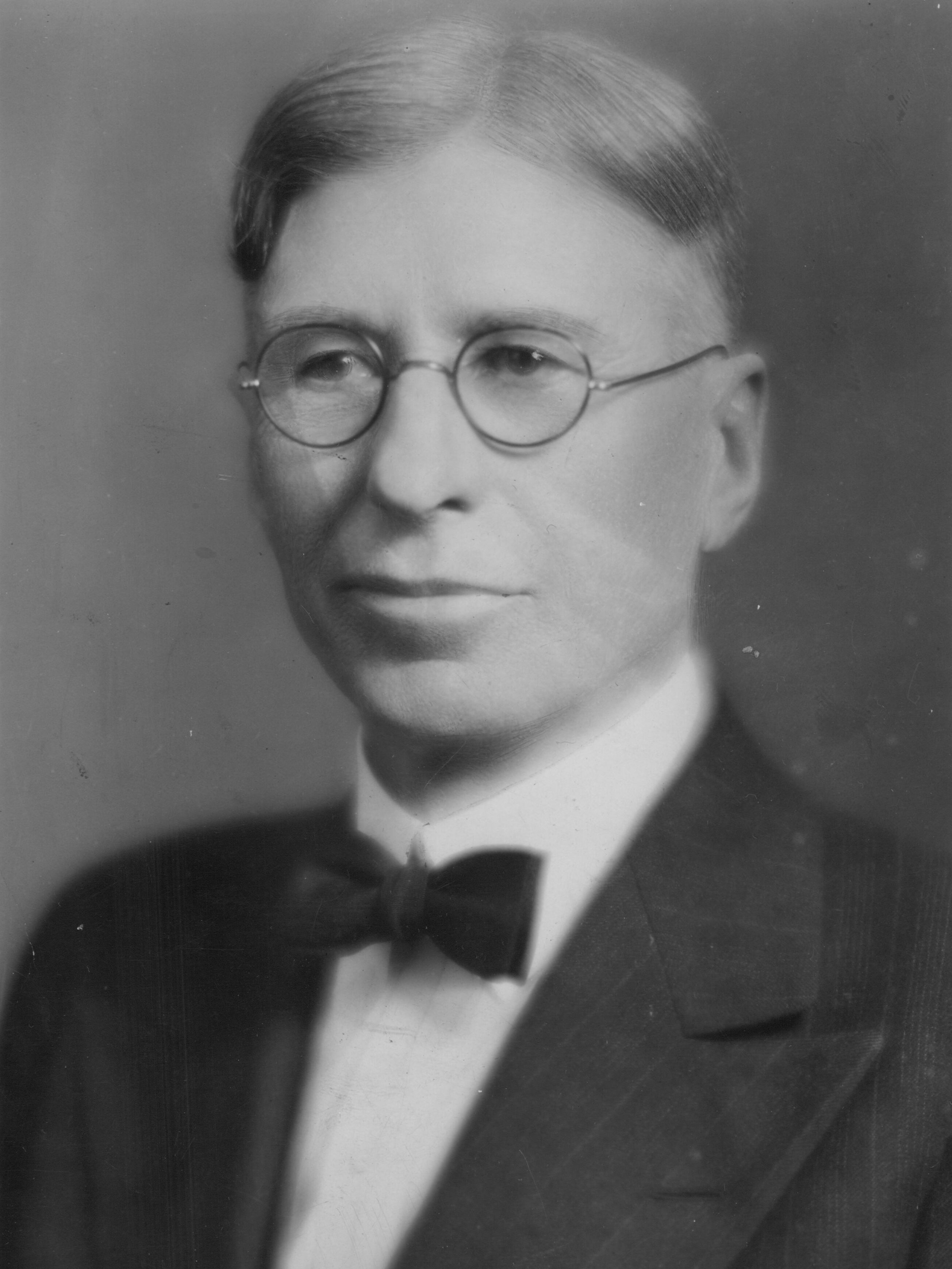

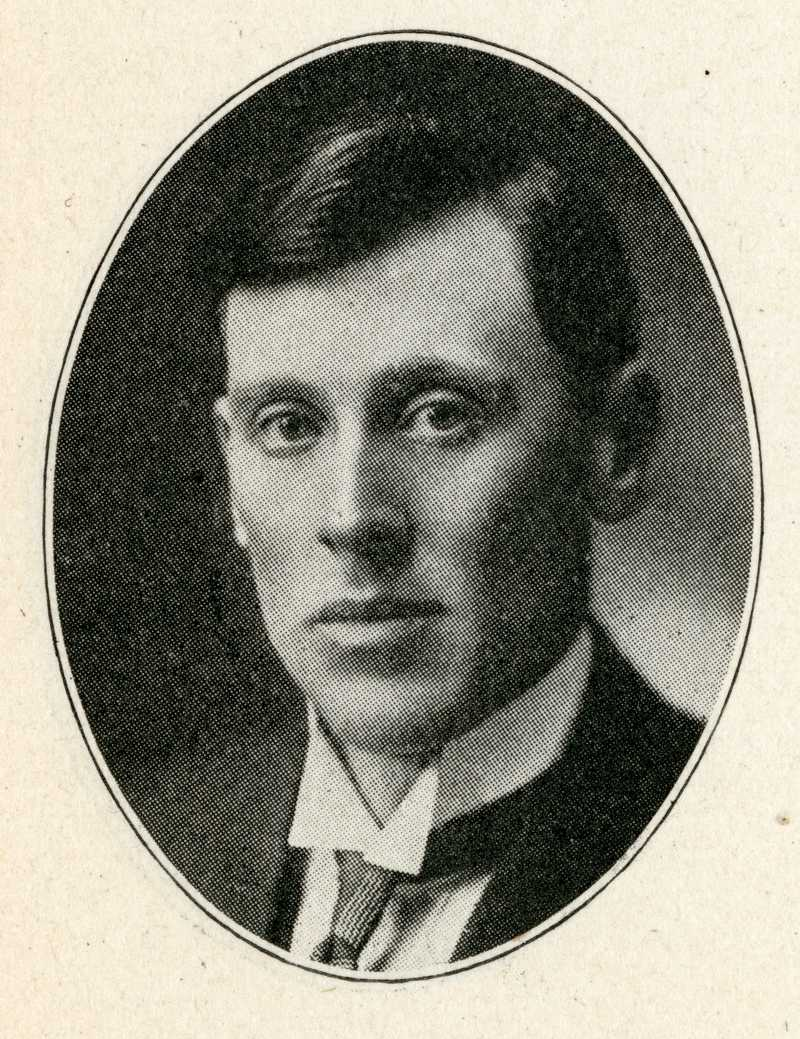
Nominee	Henrik Shipstead	Einar Hoidale	N. J. Holmberg
Party	Farmer–Labor	Democratic	Republican
Popular vote	503,379	294,757	200,083
Percentage	49.87%	29.20%	19.82%
County results
Shipstead
30–40%
40–50%
50–60%
60–70%
70–80%
Hoidale
30–40%
40–50%
50–60%
Holmberg
30–40%
U.S. senator before election
Henrik Shipstead
Farmer–Labor
Elected U.S. Senator
Henrik Shipstead
Farmer–Labor

1934 United States Senate election in Minnesota
Party	Candidate	Votes	%
Farmer–Labor	Henrik Shipstead (incumbent)	503,379	49.87%
Democratic	Einar Hoidale	294,757	29.20%
Republican	N. J. Holmberg	200,083	19.82%
Communist	Aldred Tiala	5,620	0.56%
Socialist	Morris Kaplan	5,618	0.56%
Majority		409,622	20.67%
Turnout		1,009,457	
Farmer–Labor hold			

== Mississippi ==
1934 Democratic Senate primary election in Mississippi
- September 18, 1934
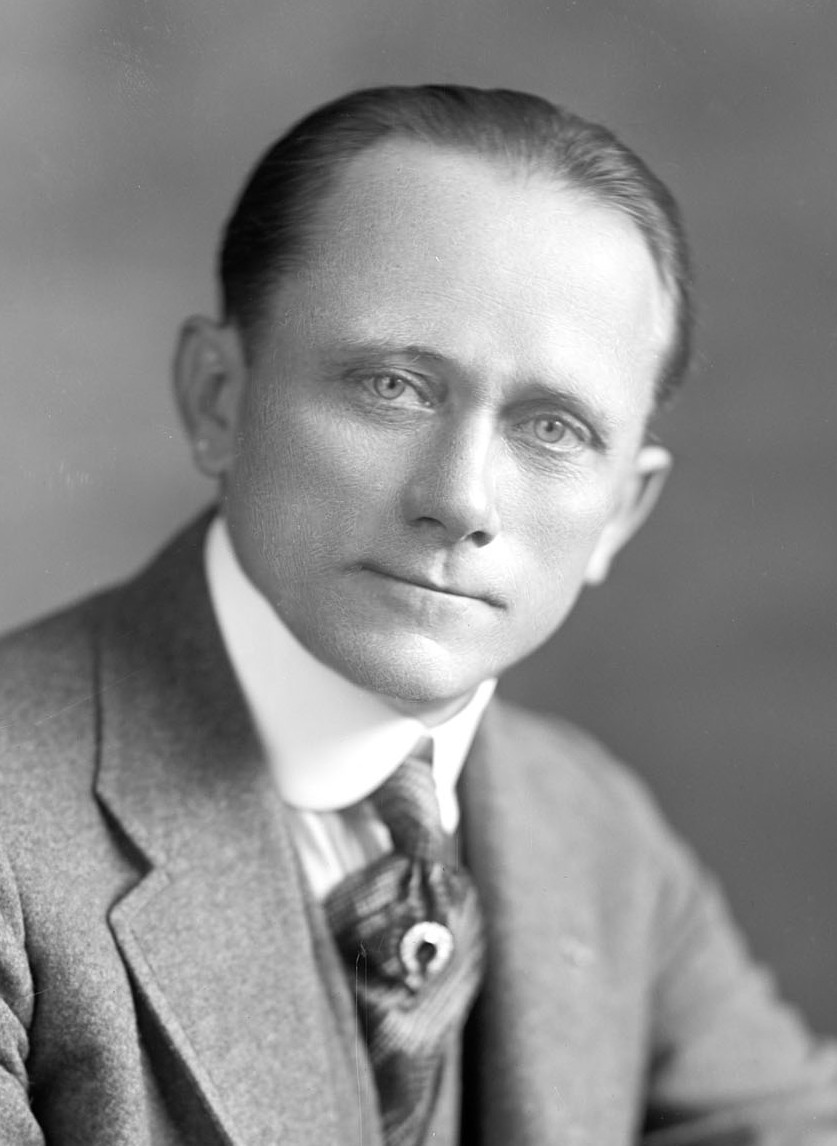

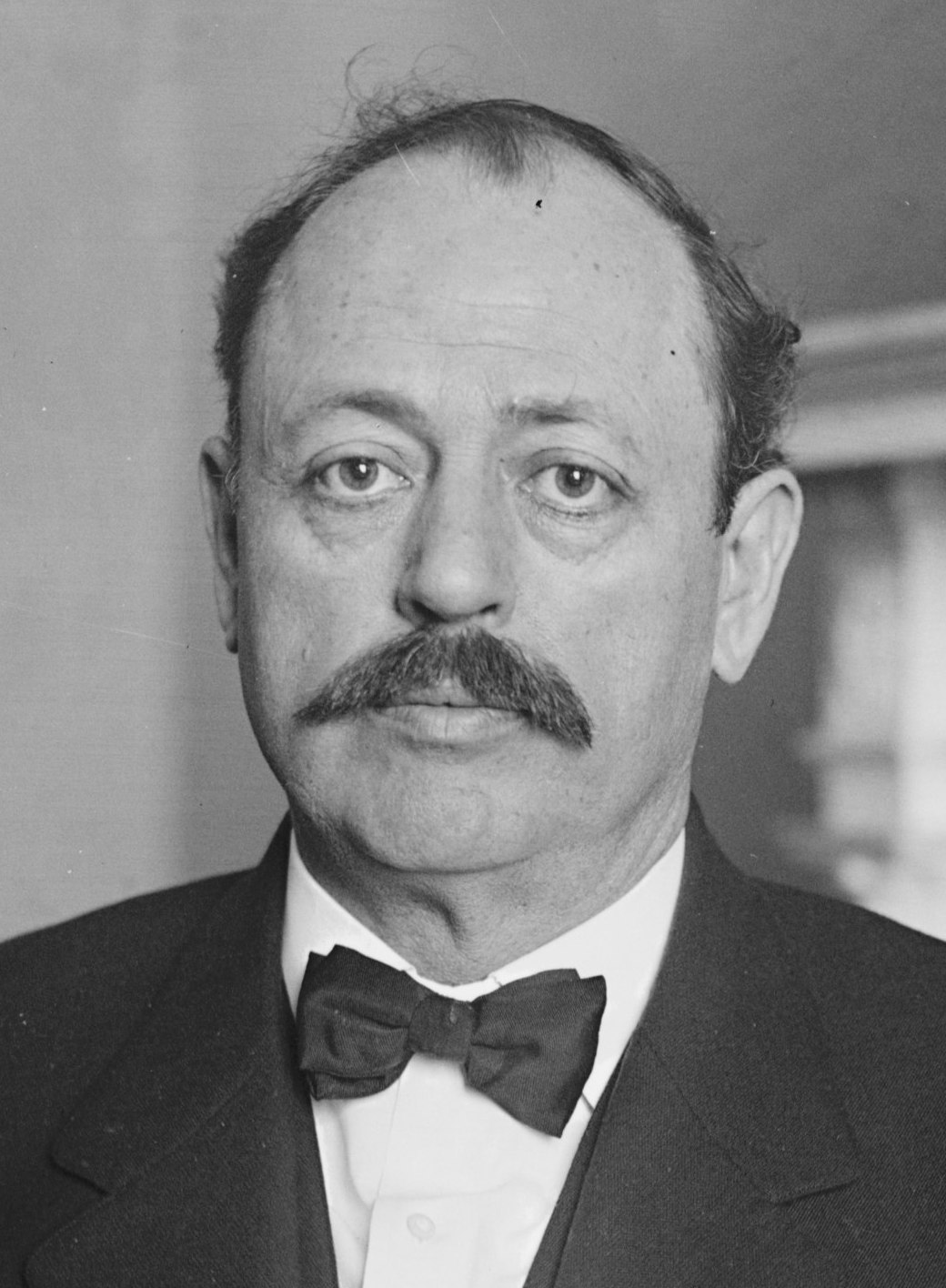
Nominee	Theodore Bilbo	Hubert Stephens
Party	Democratic	Democratic
Popular vote	101,702	94,587
Percentage	51.81%	48.19%
- County results Bilbo: 50–60% 60–70% 70–80% 80–90% Stephens: 50–60% 60–70% 70–80% 80–90%
U.S. senator before election
Hubert Stephens
Democratic
Elected U.S. Senator
Theodore Bilbo
Democratic

1934 United States Senate election in Mississippi
Party	Candidate	Votes	%
Democratic	Theodore G. Bilbo (incumbent)	51,609	100.00%
Democratic hold			

== Missouri ==
1934 United States Senate election in Missouri
- November 6, 1934
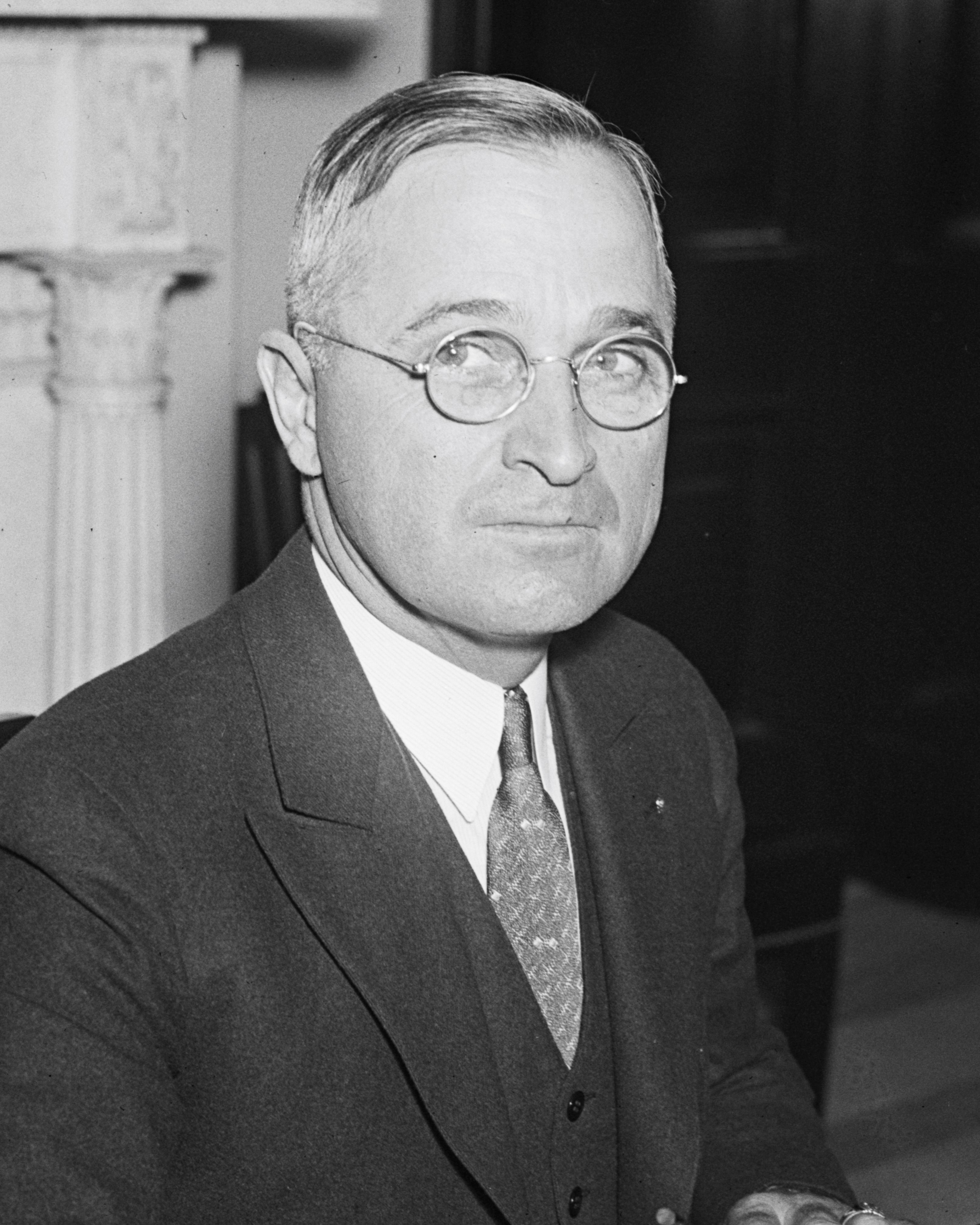

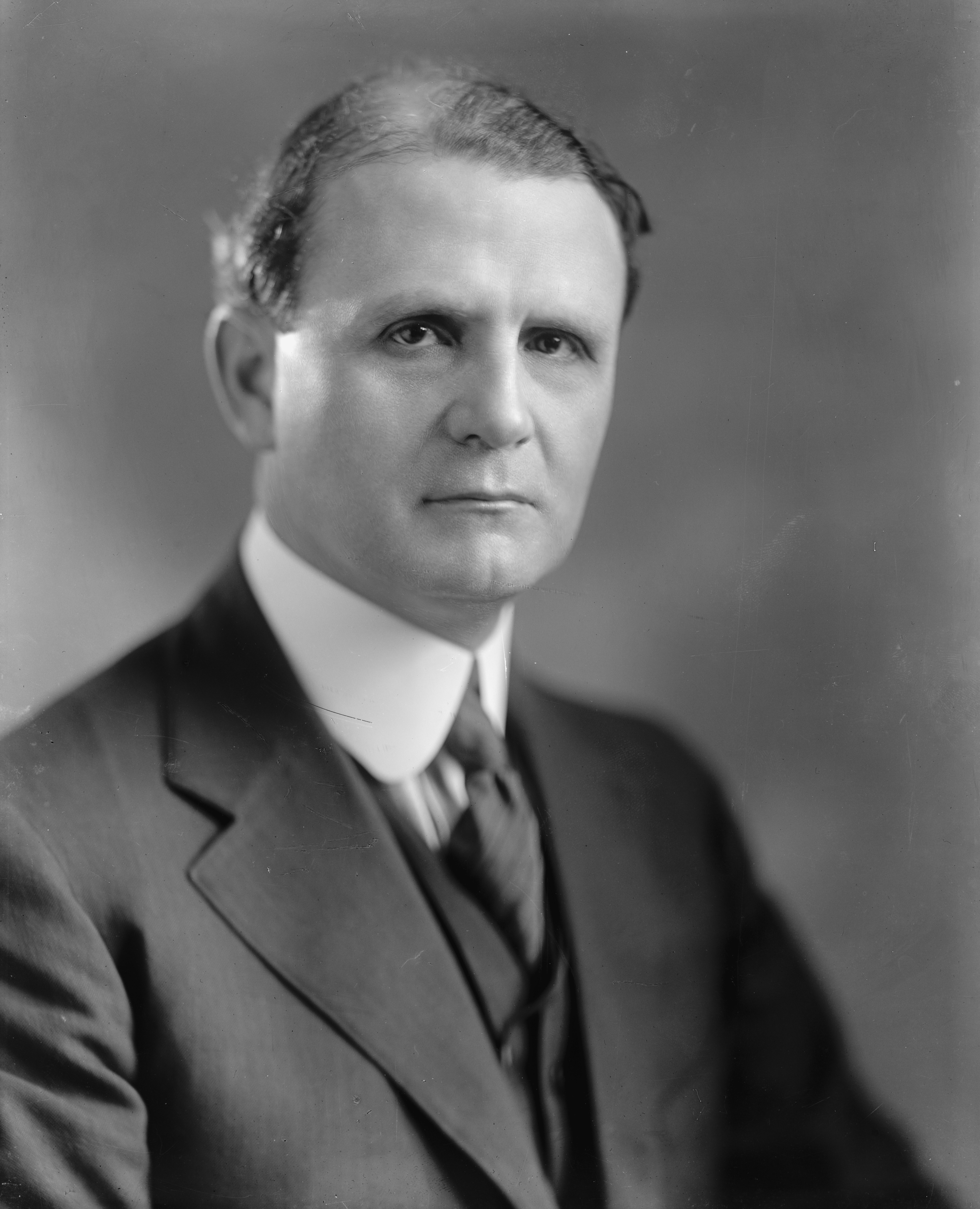
Nominee	Harry S. Truman	Roscoe C. Patterson
Party	Democratic	Republican
Popular vote	787,110	524,954
Percentage	59.55%	39.71%
- County results Truman: 40–50% 50–60% 60–70% 70–80% 80–90% >90% Patterson: 40–50% 50–60% 60–70% 70–80%
U.S. senator before election
Roscoe C. Patterson
Republican
Elected U.S. Senator
Harry S. Truman
Democratic

1934 Missouri United States Senate election
Party	Candidate	Votes	%
Democratic	Harry S. Truman	787,110	59.54%
Republican	Roscoe C. Patterson (incumbent)	524,954	39.71%
Socialist	W. C. Meyer	9,010	0.68%
Communist	Frank Brown	418	0.03%
Socialist Labor	William Wesley Cox	384	0.03%
Majority		262,156	19.83%
Turnout		1,321,876	
Democratic gain from Republican			

== Montana ==
=== Montana (regular) ===
1934 United States Senate election in Montana
- November 6, 1934
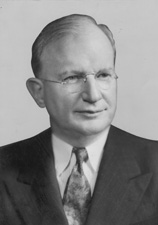

Nominee	Burton K. Wheeler	George Bourquin
Party	Democratic	Republican
Popular vote	142,823	58,519
Percentage	70.14%	28.74%
- County results Wheeler: 50–60% 60–70% 70–80% 80–90% No data
U.S. senator before election
Burton K. Wheeler
Democratic
Elected U.S. senator
Burton K. Wheeler
Democratic

1934 United States Senate election in Montana
Party	Candidate	Votes	%	±%
Democratic	Burton K. Wheeler (incumbent)	142,823	70.14%	+16.94%
Republican	George M. Bourquin	58,519	28.74%	−18.06%
Socialist	William F. Held	1,381	0.68%	
Communist	Raymond F. Gray	903	0.44%	
Majority		84,304	41.40%	+35.00%
Turnout		203,626		
Democratic hold				

=== Montana (special) ===
1934 United States Senate special election in Montana
- November 6, 1934
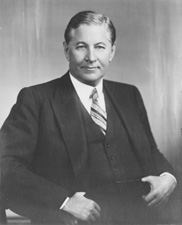

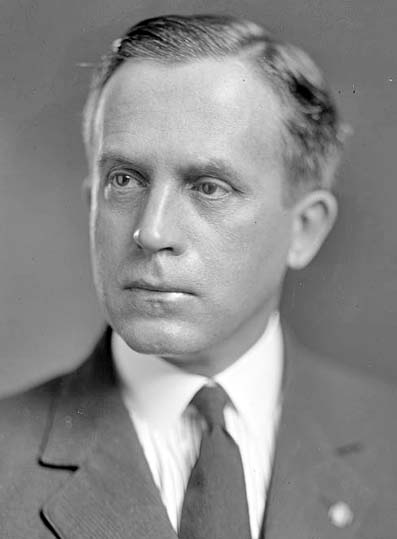
Nominee	James E. Murray	Scott Leavitt
Party	Democratic	Republican
Popular vote	116,965	77,307
Percentage	59.66%	39.43%
- County results Murray: 40–50% 50–60% 60–70% 70–80% Leavitt: 50–60% No data
U.S. senator before election
John E. Erickson
Democratic
Elected U.S. Senator
James E. Murray
Democratic

1934 United States Senate special election in Montana
Party	Candidate	Votes	%	±%
Democratic	James E. Murray	116,965	59.66%	−0.67%
Republican	Scott Leavitt	77,307	39.43%	+1.56%
Socialist	John F. Duffy	1,779	0.91%	+0.34%
Majority		39,658	20.23%	−2.22%
Turnout		196,051		
Democratic hold				

== Nebraska ==
=== Nebraska (regular) ===
1934 United States Senate election in Nebraska
- November 6, 1934
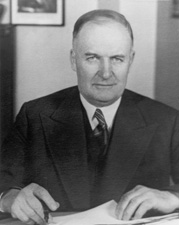

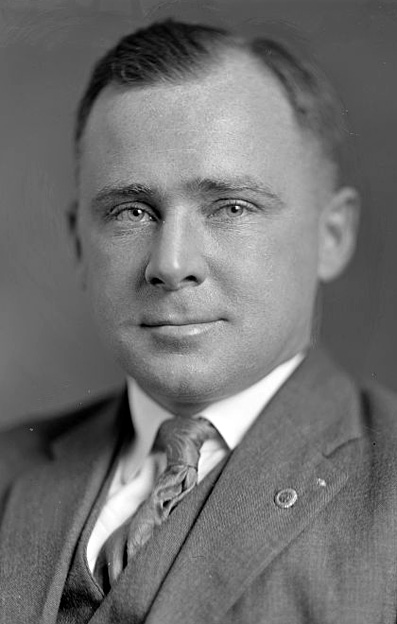
Nominee	Edward R. Burke	Robert G. Simmons
Party	Democratic	Republican
Popular vote	305,958	237,126
Percentage	55.30%	42.86%
- County results Burke: 40–50% 50–60% 60–70% Simmons: 40–50% 50–60% 60–70%
U.S. senator before election
William Henry Thompson
Democratic
Elected U.S. Senator
Edward R. Burke
Democratic

1934 United States Senate election in Nebraska
Party	Candidate	Votes	%	±%
Democratic	Edward R. Burke	305,958	55.30%	+16.58%
Republican	Robert G. Simmons	237,126	42.86%	−18.42%
Independent	Henry Hoffman	7,670	1.39%	—
Independent	E. D. O'Sullivan (write-in)	2,501	0.45%	—
Write-in		44	0.01%	—
Majority		68,832	12.44%	−10.12%
Total votes		553,299	100.00%	
Democratic hold				

=== Nebraska (special) ===
1934 United States Senate special election in Nebraska
- November 6, 1934
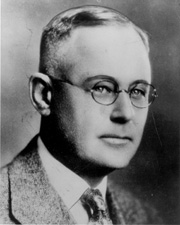

Nominee	Richard C. Hunter	J. H. Kemp
Party	Democratic	Republican
Popular vote	281,421	217,106
Percentage	56.45%	43.55%
- County results Hunter: 50–60% 60–70% Kemp: 50–60% 60–70% 70–80%
U.S. senator before election
William Henry Thompson
Democratic
Elected U.S. Senator
Richard C. Hunter
Democratic

1934 United States Senate special election in Nebraska
Party	Candidate	Votes	%	±%
Democratic	Richard C. Hunter	281,421	56.45%	+17.73%
Republican	J. H. Kemp	217,106	43.55%	−17.73%
Write-in		24	0.00%	—
Majority		64,315	12.90%	−9.66%
Total votes		498,551	100.00%	
Democratic hold				

== Nevada ==
1934 United States Senate election in Nevada
- November 6, 1934
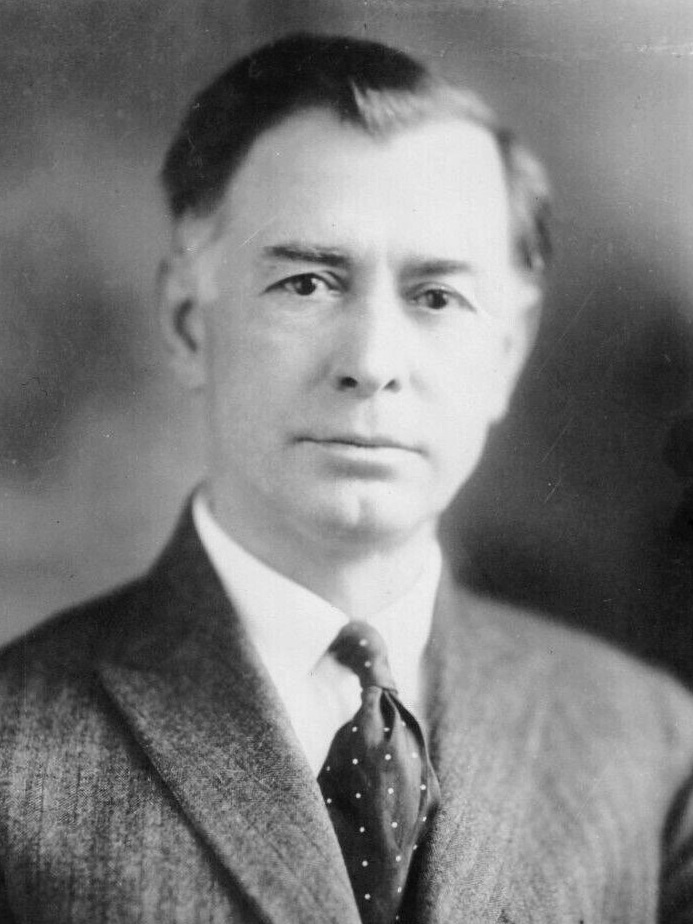

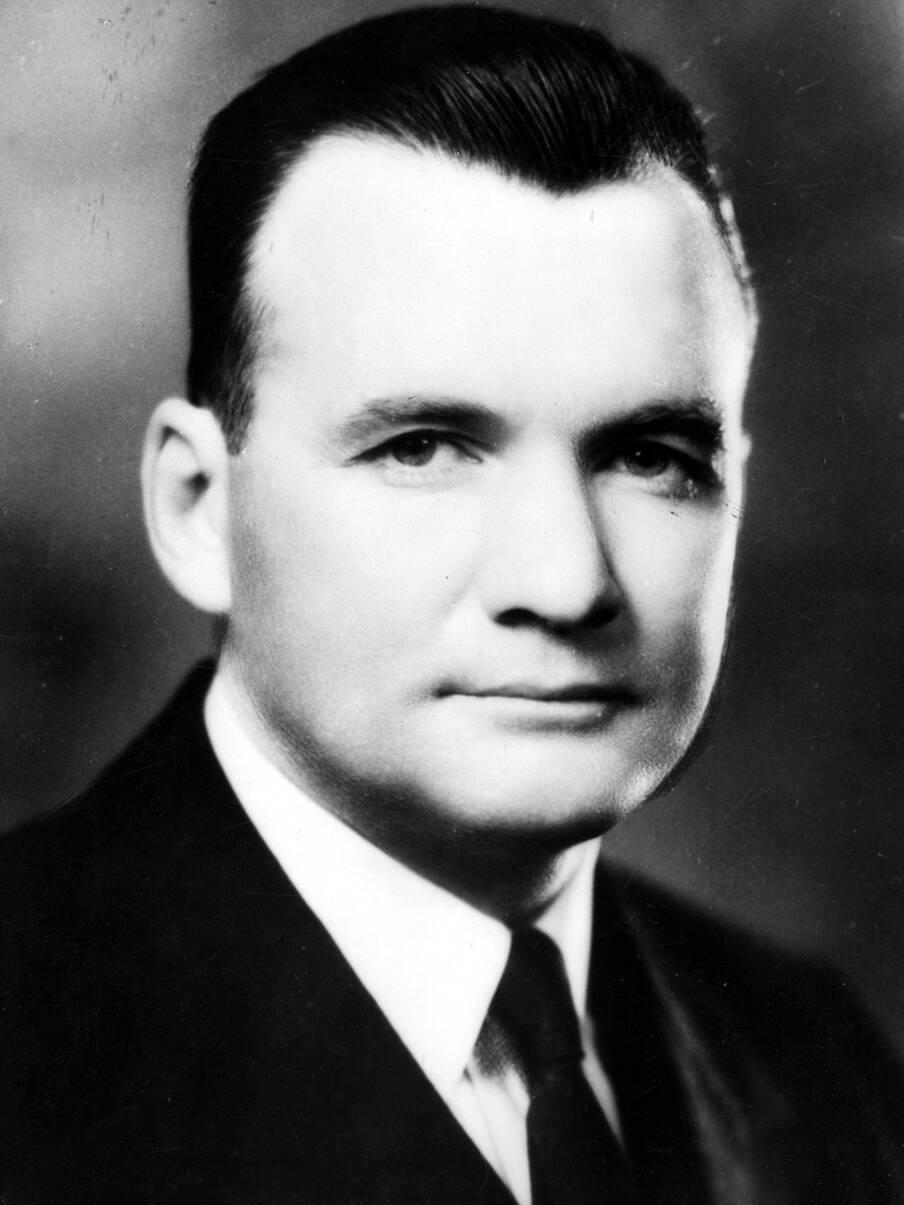
Nominee	Key Pittman	George W. Malone
Party	Democratic	Republican
Popular vote	27,581	14,273
Percentage	64.51%	33.38%
- County results Pittman: 50–60% 60–70% 70–80% 80–90% Malone: 50–60%
U.S. senator before election
Key Pittman
Democratic
Elected U.S. Senator
Key Pittman
Democratic

1934 United States Senate election in Nevada
Party	Candidate	Votes	%
Democratic	Key Pittman (incumbent)	27,581	64.51%
Republican	George W. Malone	14,273	33.38%
Independent	John P. Reynolds	901	2.11%
Majority		13,308	31.13%
Turnout		42,755	
Democratic hold			

== New Jersey ==
1934 United States Senate election in New Jersey
- November 6, 1934
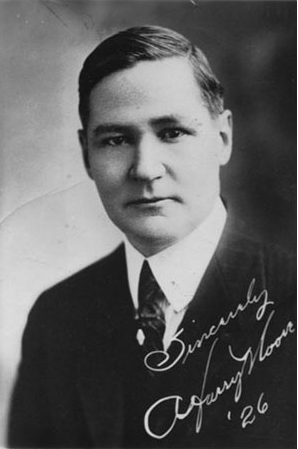

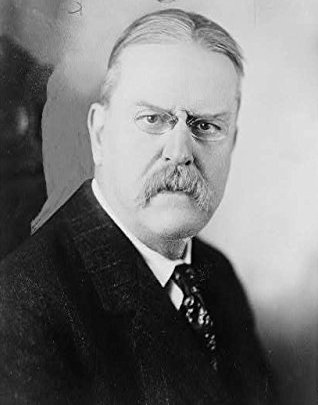
Nominee	A. Harry Moore	Hamilton Fish Kean
Party	Democratic	Republican
Popular vote	785,971	554,483
Percentage	57.90%	40.85%
- County results Moore: 40–50% 50–60% 60–70% 70–80% Kean: 50–60%
U.S. senator before election
Hamilton Fish Kean
Republican
Elected U.S. senator
A. Harry Moore
Democratic

1934 United States Senate election in New Jersey
Party	Candidate	Votes	%
Democratic	A. Harry Moore	785,971	57.90%
Republican	Hamilton Fish Kean (incumbent)	554,483	40.85%
Socialist	John S. Martin	9,721	0.72%
Communist	Rebecca Grecht	2,874	0.21%
Prohibition	Elwood Hollingshead	2,072	0.15%
Socialist Labor	John C. Butterworth	1,640	0.12%
Independent Veteran	William L. Detmering	648	0.05%
Majority		231,488	17.05%
Turnout		1,357,409	
Democratic gain from Republican			

== New Mexico ==
=== New Mexico (regular) ===
1934 United States Senate election in New Mexico
- November 6, 1934
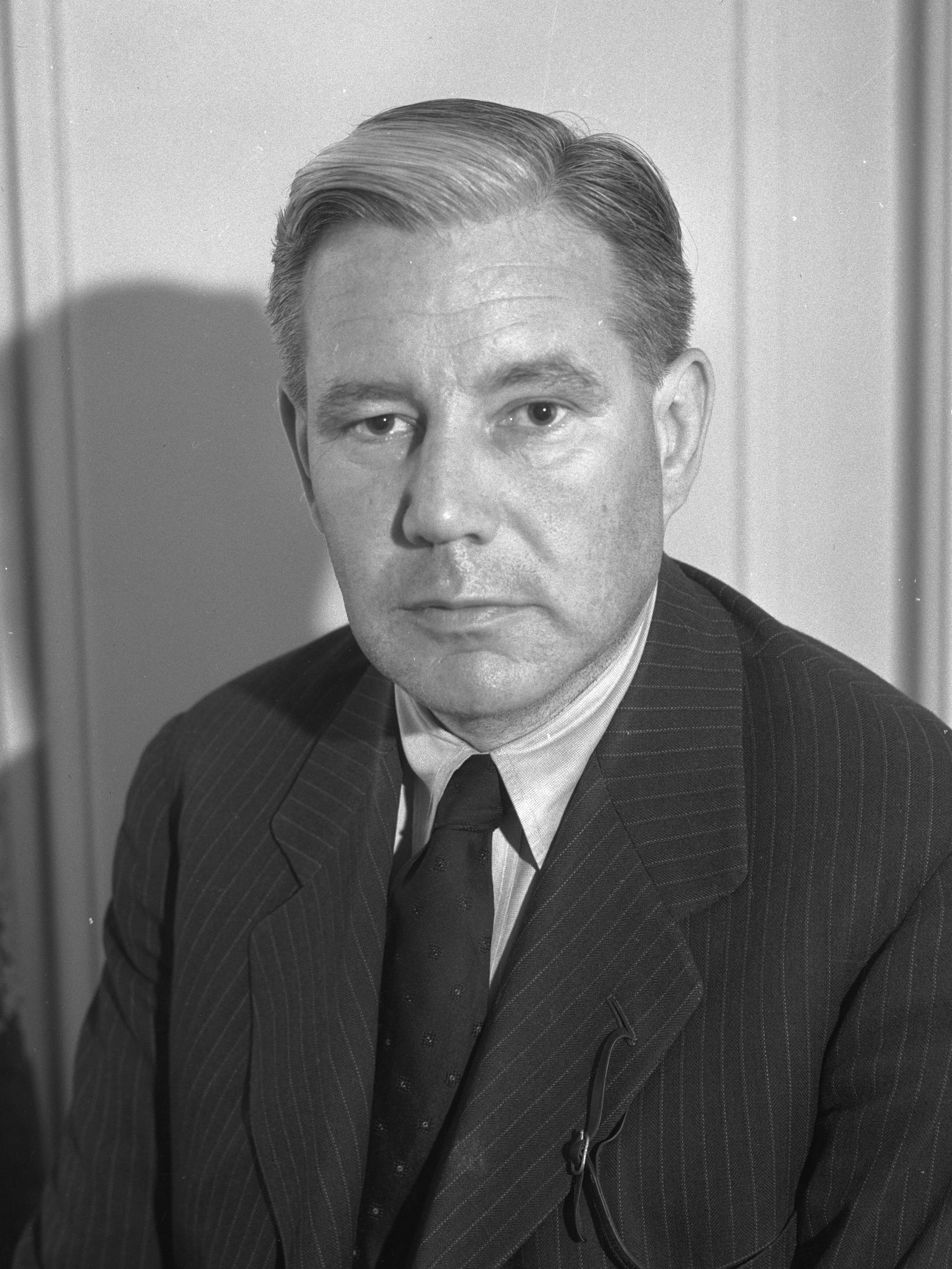

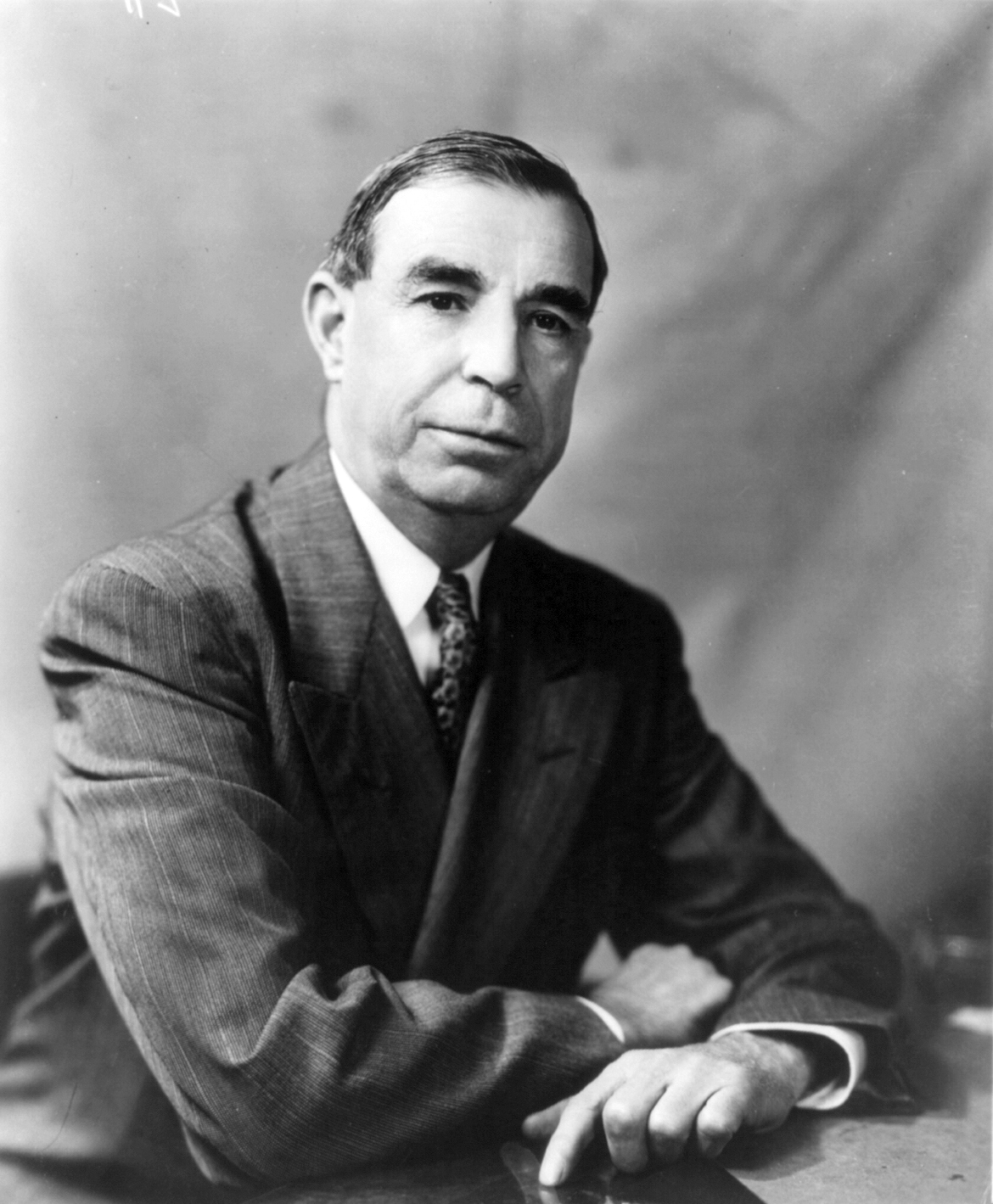
Nominee	Bronson M. Cutting	Dennis Chavez
Party	Republican	Democratic
Popular vote	76,228	74,944
Percentage	50.20%	49.35%
- County results Cutting: 40–50% 50–60% 60–70% Chevez: 50–60% 60–70%
U.S. senator before election
Bronson M. Cutting
Republican
Elected U.S. Senator
Bronson M. Cutting
Republican

1934 United States Senate election in New Mexico
Party	Candidate	Votes	%
Republican	Bronson M. Cutting (incumbent)	76,228	50.20%
Democratic	Dennis Chávez	74,944	49.35%
Socialist	W. C. Thorp	568	0.37%
Communist	Alphonso Ray	122	0.08%
Majority		1,284	0.85%
Turnout		151,862	
Republican hold			

=== New Mexico (special) ===
1934 United States Senate special election in New Mexico
- November 6, 1934
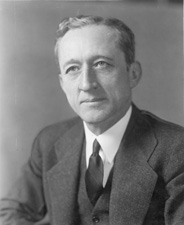

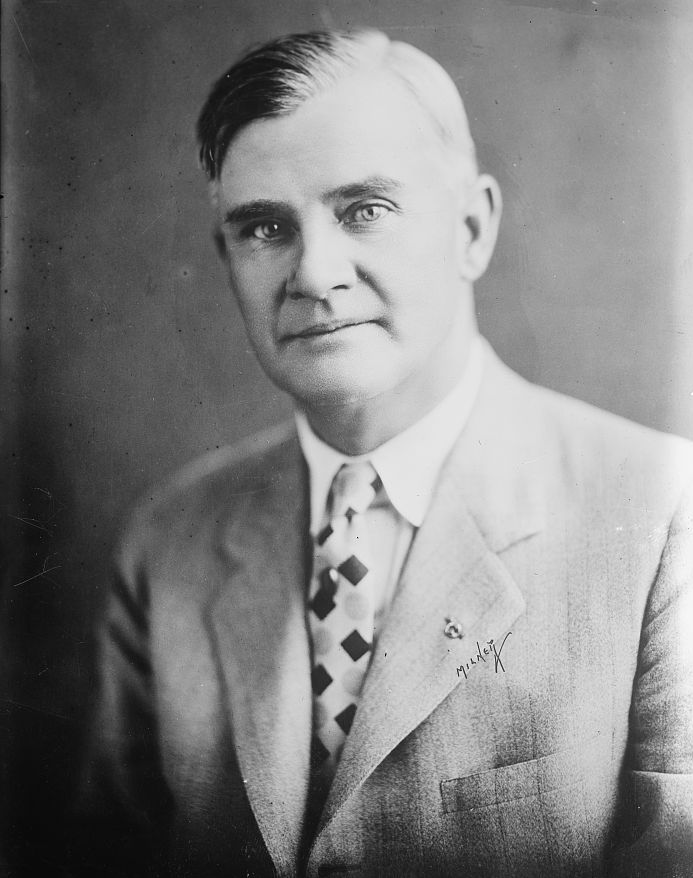
Nominee	Carl Hatch	Richard C. Dillon
Party	Democratic	Republican
Popular vote	81,934	66,956
Percentage	54.76%	44.75%
- County results Hatch: 40–50% 50–60% 60–70% 70–80% 80–90% Dillon: 50–60% 60–70%
U.S. senator before election
Carl Hatch
Democratic
Elected U.S. Senator
Carl Hatch
Democratic

1934 United States Senate special election in New Mexico
Party	Candidate	Votes	%
Democratic	Carl Hatch (incumbent)	81,934	54.76%
Republican	Richard C. Dillon	66,956	44.75%
Socialist	T. N. Hotchinson	613	0.41%
Communist	C. G. Plater	134	0.09%
Majority		14,978	10.01%
Turnout		149,637	
Democratic hold			

== New York ==
1934 United States Senate election in New York
- November 6, 1934
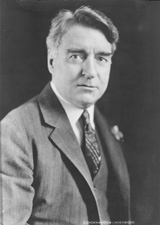

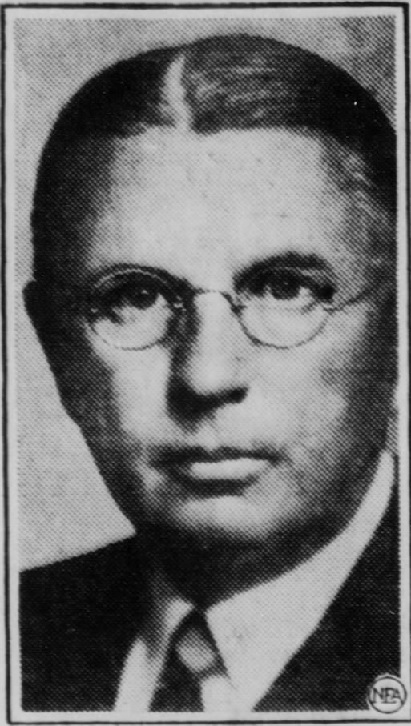

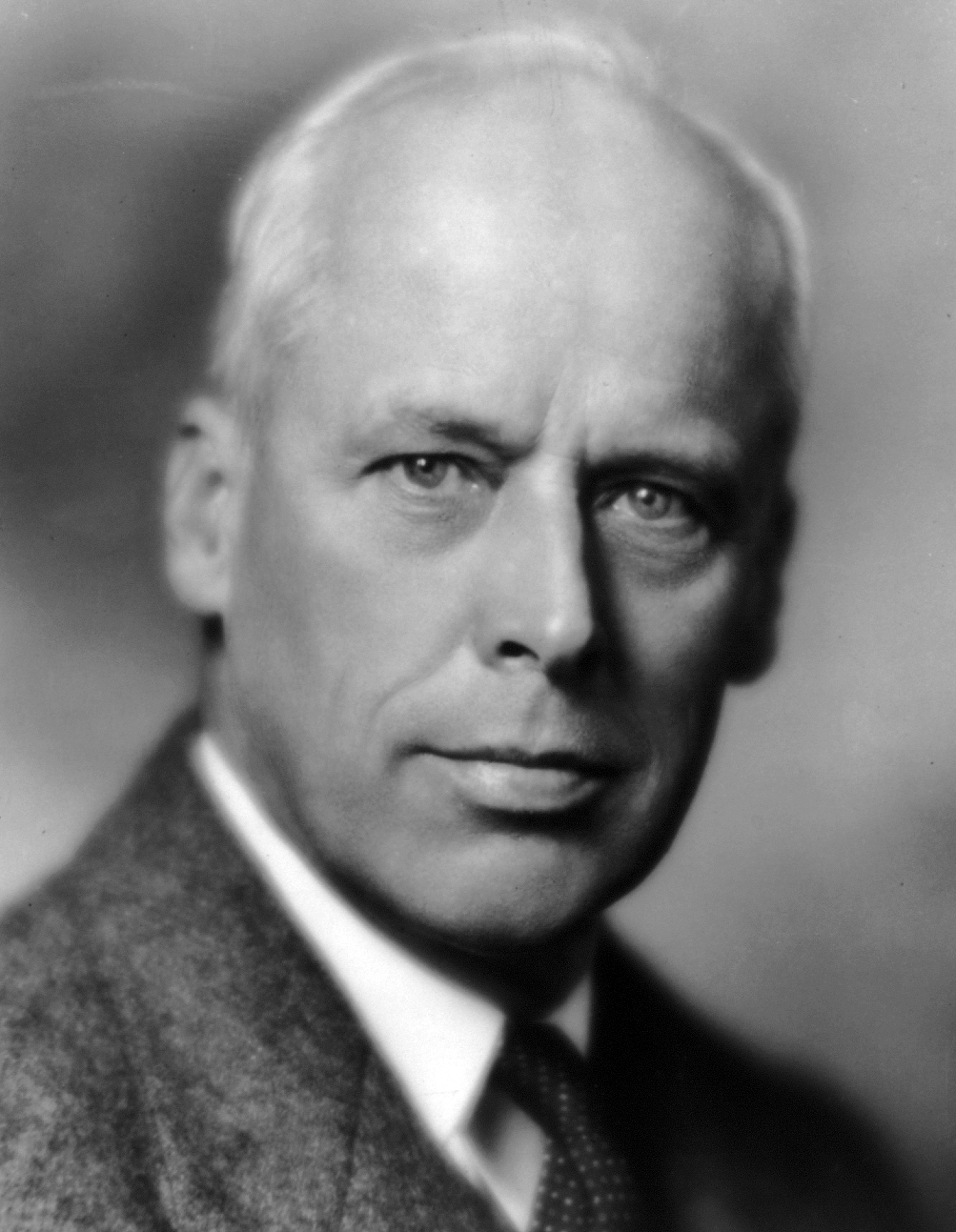
Nominee	Royal S. Copeland	E. Harold Cluett	Norman Thomas
Party	Democratic	Republican	Socialist
Popular vote	2,046,377	1,363,440	194,952
Percentage	55.34%	36.87%	5.27%
- County results Copeland: 40–50% 50–60% 60–70% 70–80% Cluett: 40–50% 50–60% 60–70%
U.S. senator before election
Royal S. Copeland
Democratic
Elected U.S. Senator
Royal S. Copeland
Democratic

In New York, the whole Democratic ticket was elected in the third landslide in a row.

1934 United States Senate election
Party	Candidate	Votes	%	±%
Democratic	Royal S. Copeland (incumbent)	2,046,377	55.21%	+6.13%
Republican	E. Harold Cluett	1,363,440	36.87%	−11.02%
Socialist	Norman Thomas	194,952	5.27%	+2.65%
Communist	Max Bedacht	45,396	1.23%	+0.95%
Constitutional	Henry Skillman Breckinridge	24,241	0.66%	N/A
Prohibition	Michael Bartell	16,769	0.45%	+0.45%
Socialist Labor	Olive Johnson	6,622	0.18%	+0.05%
Total votes		3,727,797	100.00%	

== North Dakota ==
1934 United States Senate election in North Dakota
- November 6, 1934
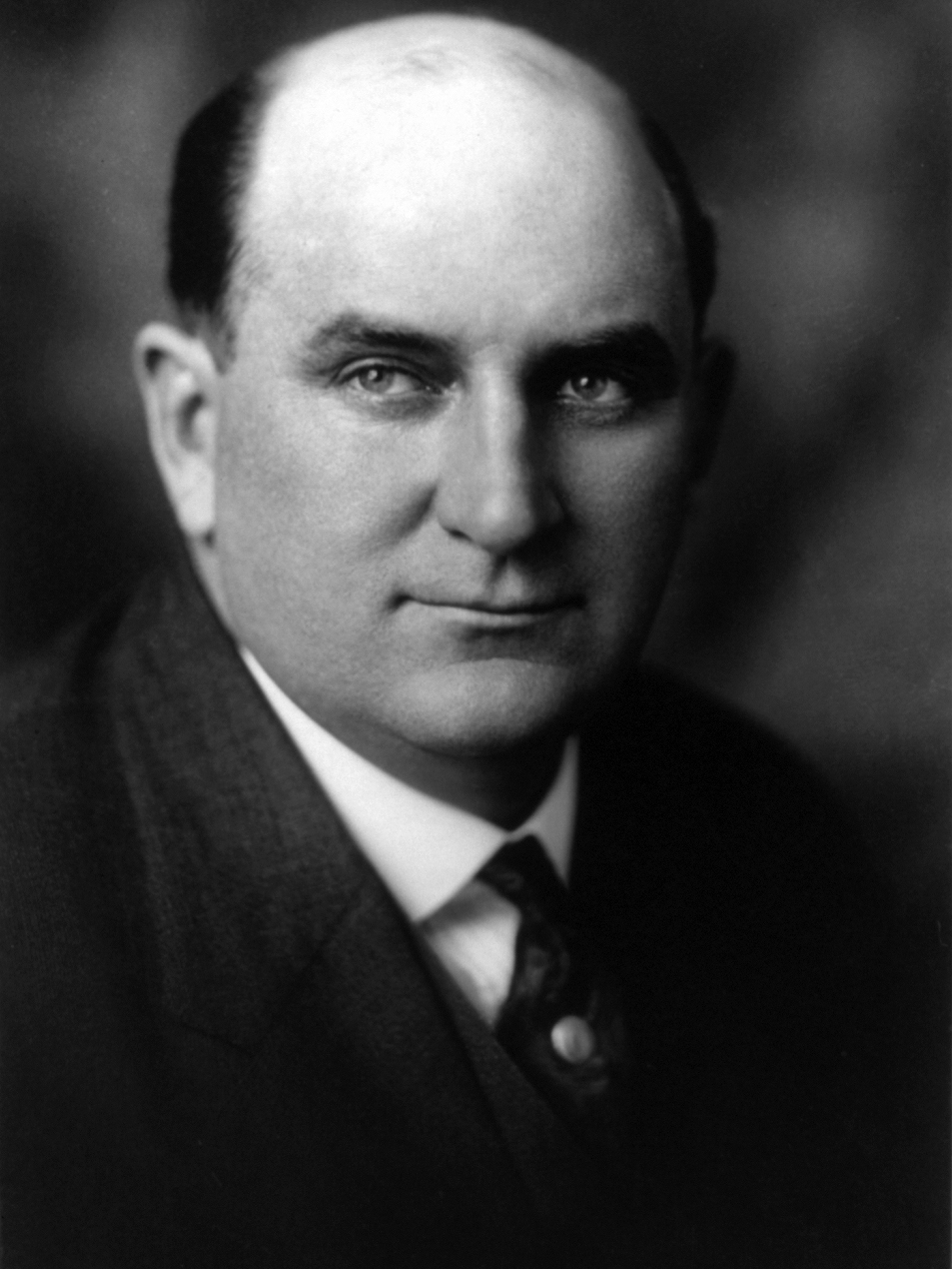

Nominee	Lynn Frazier	Henry Holt
Party	Republican	Democratic
Popular vote	151,205	104,477
Percentage	58.24%	40.24%
- County results Frazier: 50–60% 60–70% 70–80% Holt: 50–60%
U.S. senator before election
Lynn Frazier
Republican
Elected U.S. Senator
Lynn Frazier
Republican

1934 United States Senate election in North Dakota
Party	Candidate	Votes	%	±%
Republican	Lynn Frazier (inc.)	151,205	58.24%	−21.39%
Democratic	Henry Holt	104,477	40.24%	+20.90%
Independent	Alfred S. Dale	3,269	1.26%	—
Independent	Arvo F. Husa	656	0.25%	—
Majority		46,728	18.00%	−42.29%
Turnout		259,607		
Republican hold				

== Ohio ==
1934 United States Senate election in Ohio
- November 6, 1934
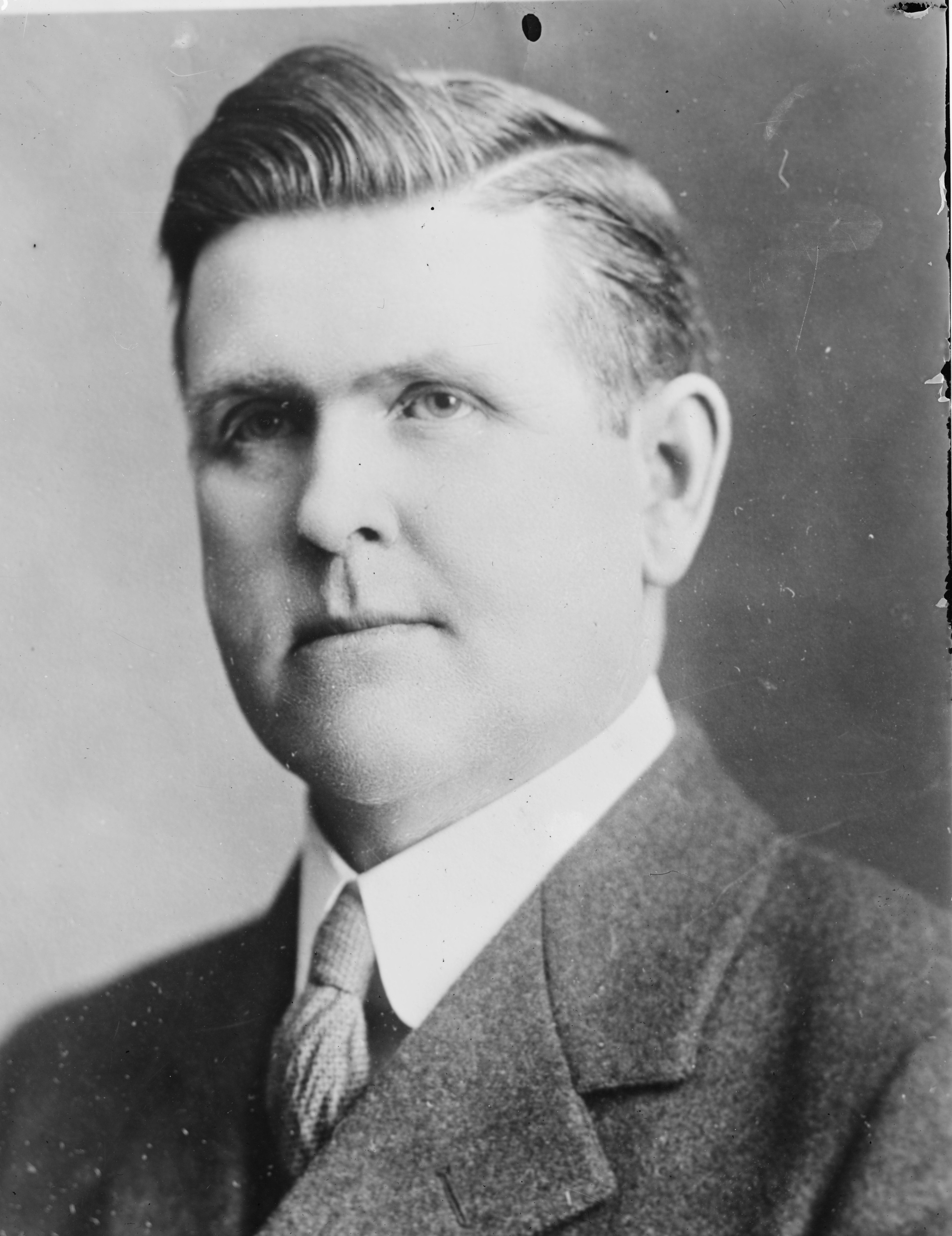

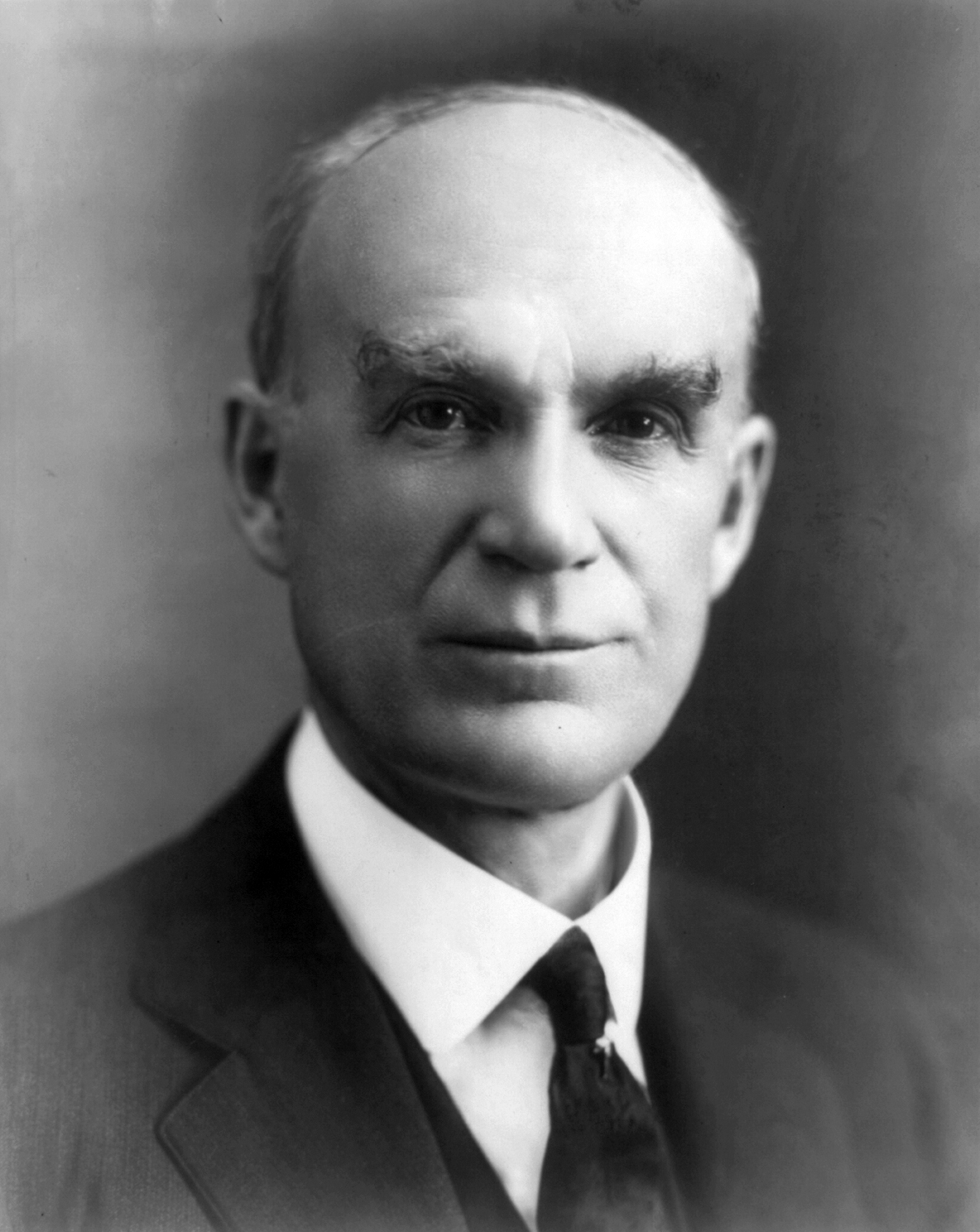
Nominee	Vic Donahey	Simeon Fess
Party	Democratic	Republican
Popular vote	1,276,206	839,068
Percentage	59.95%	39.41%
U.S. senator before election
Simeon Fess
Republican
Elected U.S. Senator
Vic Donahey
Democratic

1934 United States Senate election in Ohio
Party	Candidate	Votes	%
Democratic	A. Victor Donahey	1,276,206	59.95%
Republican	Simeon D. Fess (incumbent)	839,068	39.41%
Communist	W. C. Sandberg	13,546	0.64%
None	Scattering	23	0.00%
Majority		437,138	20.54%
Turnout		2,128,843	
Democratic gain from Republican			

== Pennsylvania ==
1934 United States Senate election in Pennsylvania
- November 6, 1934
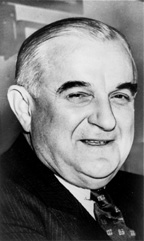

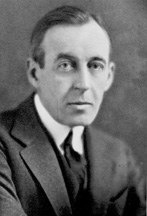
Nominee	Joseph F. Guffey	David A. Reed
Party	Democratic	Republican
Popular vote	1,494,010	1,366,872
Percentage	50.78%	46.46%
- County results Guffey: 40–50% 50–60% 60–70% Martin: 40–50% 50–60% 60–70%
U.S. senator before election
David A. Reed
Republican
Elected U.S. Senator
Joseph F. Guffey
Democratic

General election
Party	Candidate	Votes	%	±%
Democratic	Joseph F. Guffey	1,494,010	50.78%	+16.78%
Republican	David A. Reed (incumbent)	1,366,872	46.46%	−17.92%
Socialist	James H. Maurer	50,444	0.39%	−0.37%
Prohibition	Edwin J. Fithian	19,985	0.68%	+0.19%
Communist	Harry M. Wicks	6,170	0.21%	+0.21%
Socialist Labor	George W. Ohls	4,665	0.16%	+0.12%
N/A	Other	129	0.00%	N/A
Majority		127,948	4.32%	
Turnout		2,942,275		
Democratic gain from Republican				

== Rhode Island ==
1934 United States Senate election in Rhode Island
Party	Candidate	Votes	%
Democratic	Peter G. Gerry	140,700	57.12%
Republican	Felix Hebert (incumbent)	105,545	42.85%
None	Scattering	68	0.03%
Majority		35,155	14.27%
Turnout		246,313	
Democratic gain from Republican			

== Tennessee ==
There were two elections due to a resignation.

=== Tennessee (regular) ===
1934 United States Senate election in Tennessee
- November 6, 1934
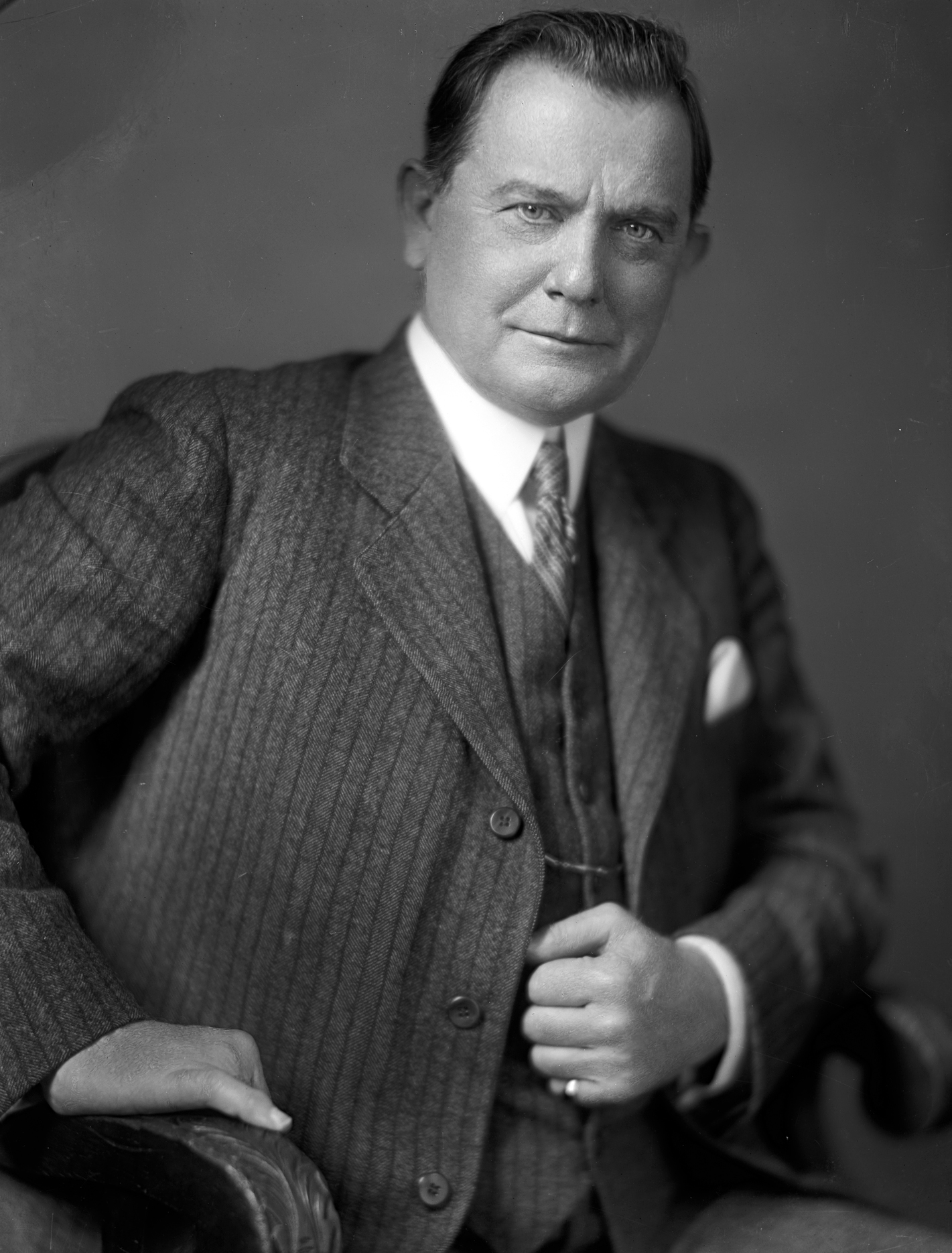

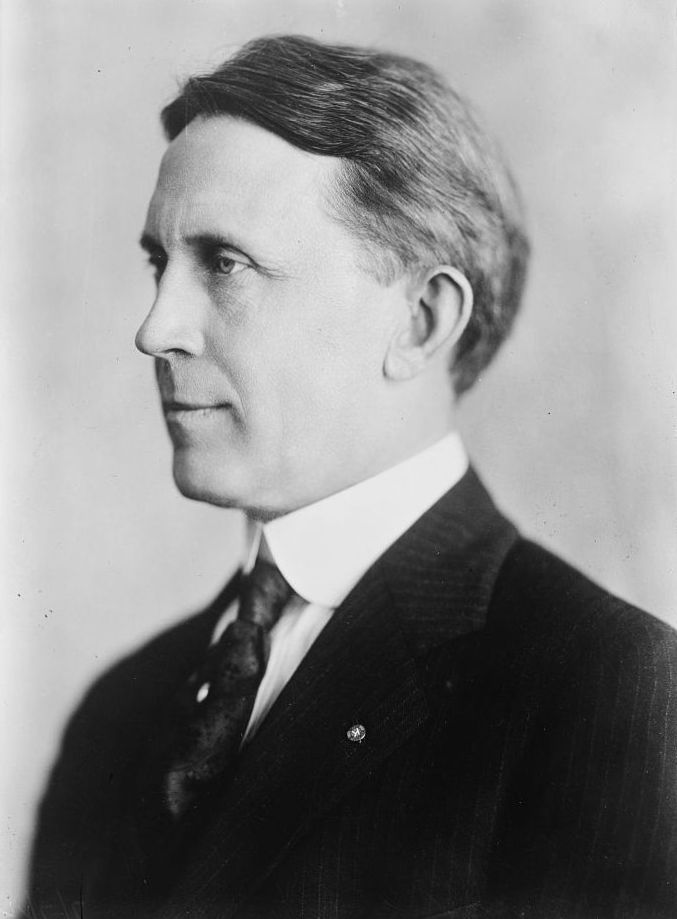
Nominee	Kenneth McKellar	Ben W. Hooper
Party	Democratic	Republican
Popular vote	195,430	110,401
Percentage	63.40%	35.81%
- County results McKellar: 50–60% 60–70% 70–80% 80–90% >90% Hooper: 40–50% 50–60% 60–70% 70–80%
U.S. senator before election
Kenneth McKellar
Democratic
Elected U.S. senator
Kenneth McKellar
Democratic

Three-term Democrat Kenneth D. McKellar was easily re-elected.

1934 United States Senate election in Tennessee
Party	Candidate	Votes	%
Democratic	Kenneth D. McKellar (incumbent)	195,430	63.39%
Republican	Ben W. Hooper	110,401	35.81%
Independent	C. W. Holsington	2,443	0.79%
Majority		85,029	27.58%
Turnout			
Democratic hold			

=== Tennessee (special) ===
1934 United States Senate special election in Tennessee
- November 6, 1934
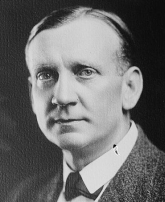

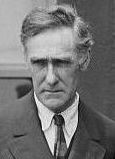
Nominee	Nathan L. Bachman	John Randolph Neal Jr.
Party	Democratic	Independent
Popular vote	200,249	49,773
Percentage	80.09%	19.91%
Senator before election
Nathan L. Bachman
Democratic
Elected Senator
Nathan L. Bachman
Democratic

One-term Democrat Cordell Hull resigned March 3, 1933 to become U.S. secretary of state.

Democrat Nathan L. Bachman was appointed to continue Hull's term, pending a special election which Bachman easily won.

1934 United States Senate special election in Tennessee
Party	Candidate	Votes	%
Democratic	Nathan L. Bachman (incumbent)	200,249	80.09%
Independent	John Randolph Neal Jr.	49,773	19.91%
Majority		150,476	60.18%
Turnout		250,022	
Democratic hold			

== Texas ==
Texas election
- November 6, 1934
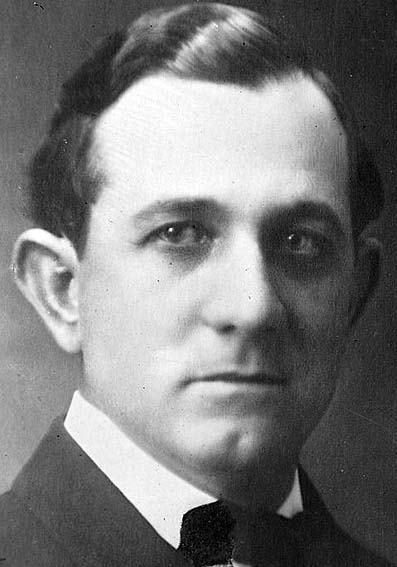
Nominee	Tom Connally
Party	Democratic
Alliance	Republican
Popular vote	439,375
Percentage	96.69%
- County results Daniel: 60–70% 70–80% 80–90% 90–100%
U.S. senator before election
Tom Connally
Democratic
Elected U.S. Senator
Tom Connally
Democratic

1934 United States Senate election in Texas
Party	Candidate	Votes	%
Democratic	Tom Connally (incumbent)	439,375	96.69
Republican	Ulysses S. Goen	12,895	2.84
Socialist	William Burr Starr	1,828	0.40
Communist	L. C. Keel	310	0.07
Majority		426,480	93.85
Turnout		454,408	
Democratic hold			

== Utah ==
1934 United States Senate election in Utah
- November 6, 1934
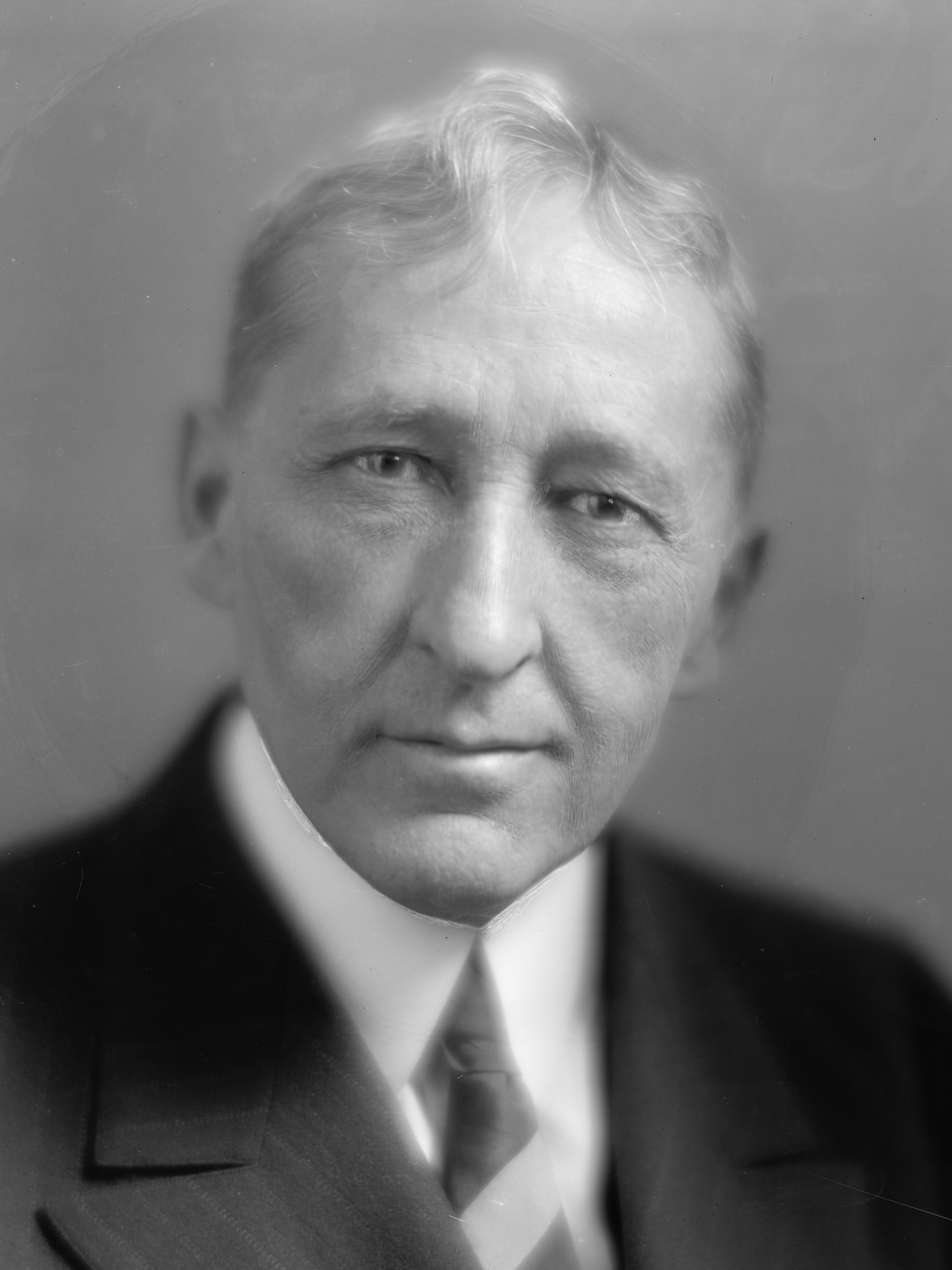

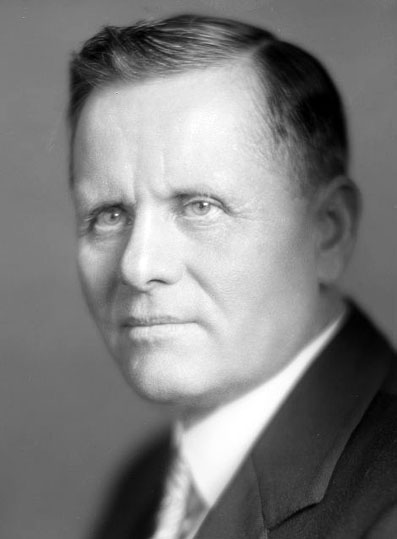
Nominee	William H. King	Don B. Colton
Party	Democratic	Republican
Popular vote	95,931	82,154
Percentage	53.06%	45.44%
- County results King: 40–50% 50–60% 60–70% Colton: 40–50% 50–60% 60–70%
U.S. senator before election
William H. King
Democratic
Elected U.S. Senator
William H. King
Democratic

1934 United States Senate election in Utah
Party	Candidate	Votes	%
Democratic	William H. King (incumbent)	95,931	53.06%
Republican	Don B. Colton	82,154	45.44%
Socialist	John O. Waters	1,497	0.83%
Communist	Cornelia B. Johnson	1,207	0.67%
Majority		13,777	7.92%
Turnout		180,792	
Democratic hold			

== Vermont ==
=== Vermont (regular) ===
1934 United States Senate election in Vermont
- January 16, 1934
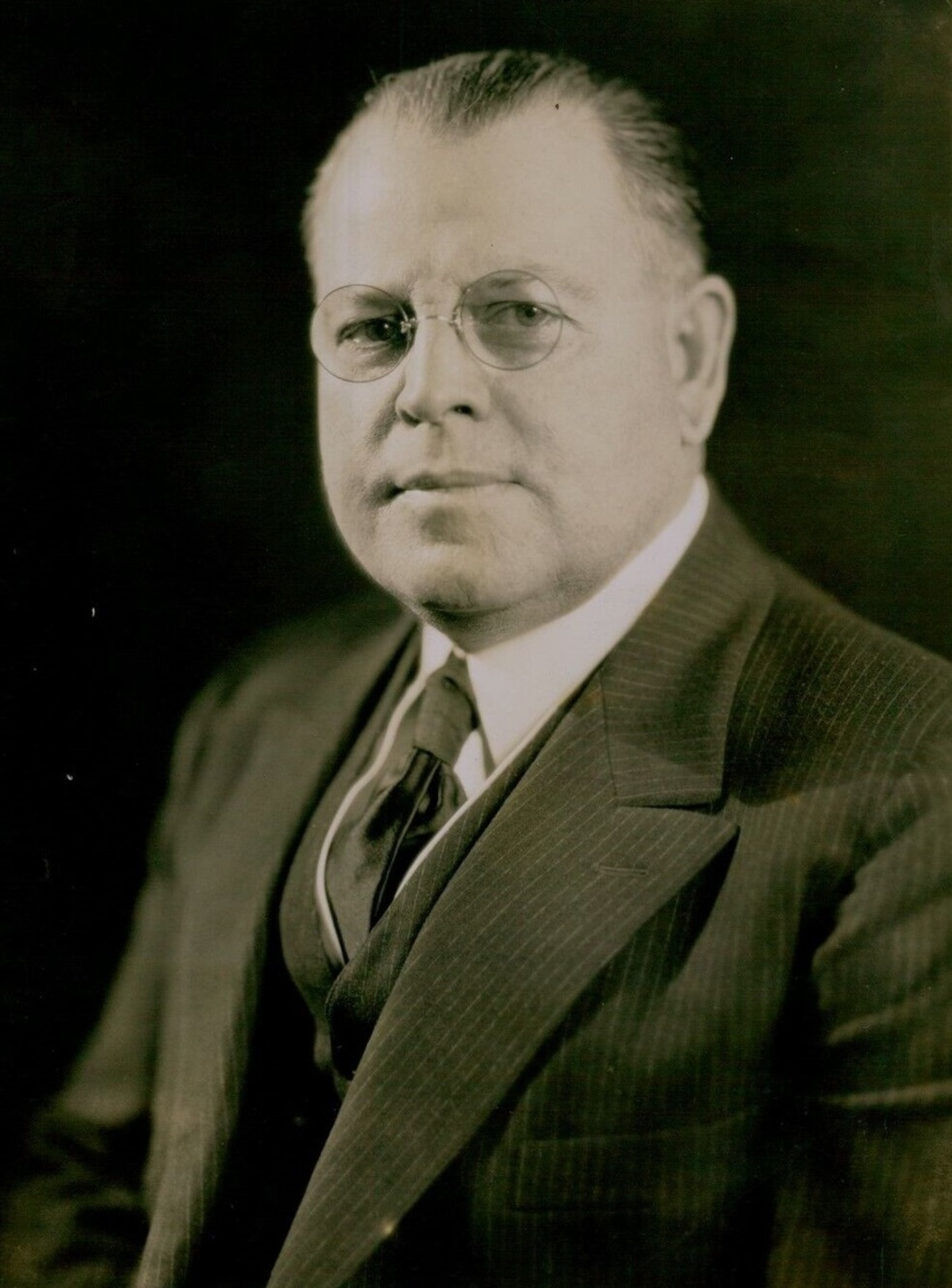

Nominee	Warren Austin	Fred C. Martin
Party	Republican	Democratic
Popular vote	67,146	63,632
Percentage	51.0%	48.4%
- County results Austin: 50–60% 60–70% 70–80% Martin: 50–60%
U.S. senator before election
Warren Austin
Republican
Elected U.S. Senator
Warren Austin
Republican

1934 United States Senate election in Vermont
Party	Candidate	Votes	%	±%
Republican	Warren Austin (incumbent)	67,146	51.0%	
Democratic	Fred C. Martin	63,632	48.4%	
Socialist	Charles R. Butler	771	0.0%	
N/A	Other	3	0.0%	
Total votes		131,552	100	

=== Vermont (special) ===
1934 United States Senate special election in Vermont
- January 16, 1934
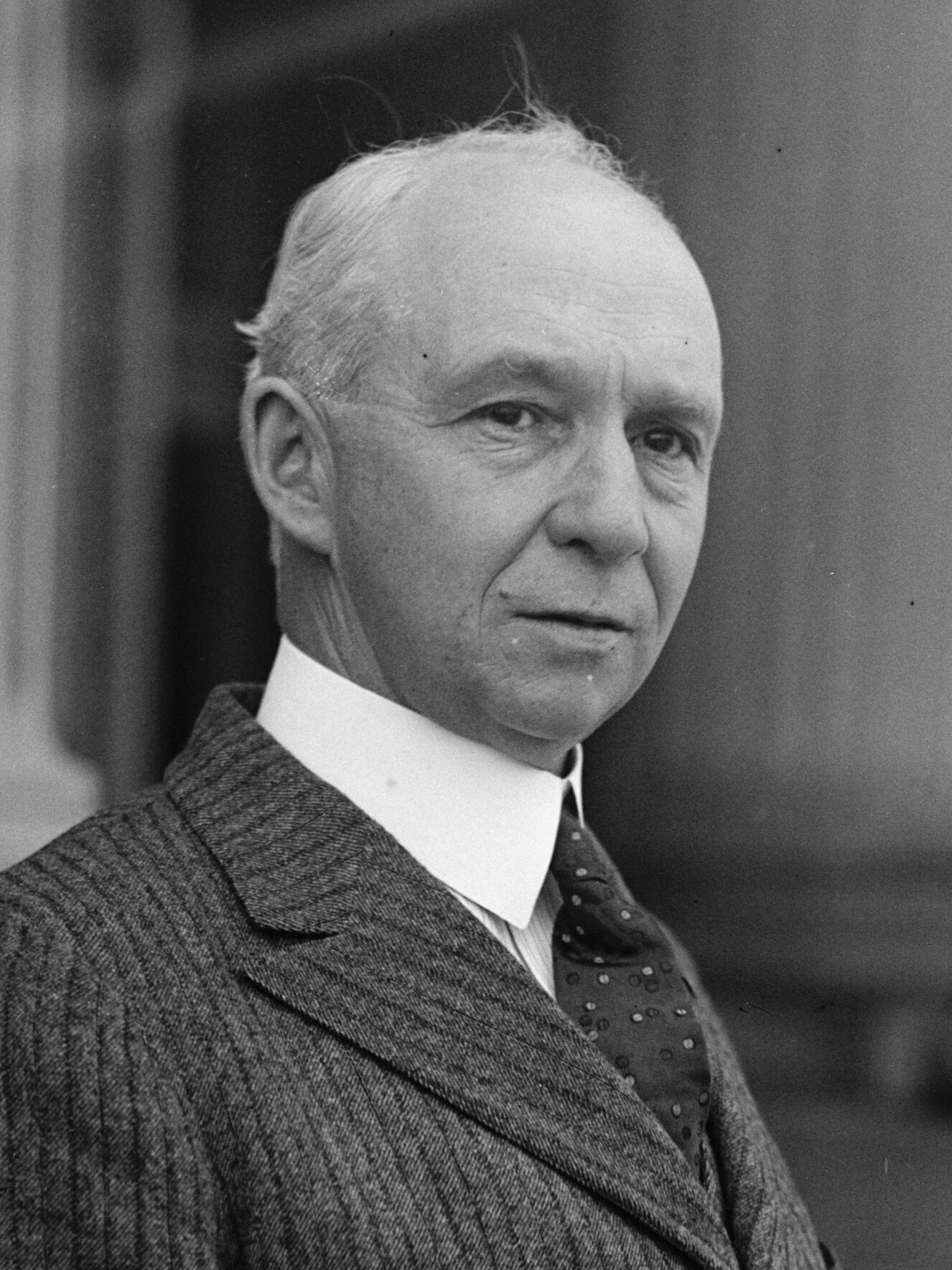

Nominee	Ernest Willard Gibson	Harry Witters
Party	Republican	Democratic
Popular vote	28,436	20,382
Percentage	58.23%	41.74%
- Gibson: 50–60% 60–70% 70–80% 80–90% >90% Witters: 50–60% 60–70% 70–80% 80–90% >90% Tie: 50%
U.S. senator before election
Porter H. Dale
Republican
Elected U.S. Senator
Ernest W. Gibson, Sr.
Republican

1934 United States Senate special election in Vermont
Party	Candidate	Votes	%
Republican	Ernest W. Gibson (incumbent)	28,436	58.2%
Democratic	Harry W. Witters	20,382	41.7%
N/A	Other	12	0.1%
Total votes		48,830	100.0%

== Virginia ==
1934 United States Senate election in Virginia
- November 6, 1934
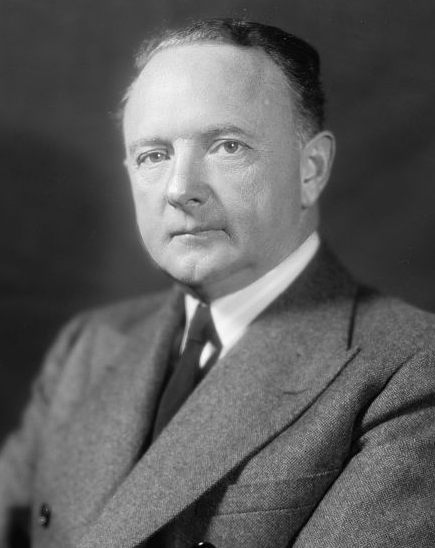

Nominee	Harry F. Byrd, Sr.	Lawrence C. Page
Party	Democratic	Republican
Popular vote	109,963	30,289
Percentage	75.96%	20.92%
- County and independent city results Byrd: 50–60% 60–70% 70–80% 80–90% 90–100% Page: 50–60%
U.S. senator before election
Harry F. Byrd, Sr.
Democratic
Elected U.S. Senator
Harry F. Byrd, Sr.
Democratic

1934 United States Senate election in Virginia
Party	Candidate	Votes	%	±%
Democratic	Harry F. Byrd Sr. (incumbent)	109,963	75.96%	+4.65%
Republican	Lawrence C. Page	30,289	20.92%	−5.75%
Independent	J. L. Litz	1,503	1.04%	
Socialist	Herman R. Ansell	1,127	0.78%	+0.10%
Independent	John G. Bowman	1,046	0.72%	
Communist	Alexander Wright	431	0.30%	+0.30%
Prohibition	Hewman H. Raymond	391	0.27%	−0.15%
Write-ins		22	0.02%	+0.02%
Majority		79,674	55.03%	+10.39%
Turnout		144,772		
Democratic hold				

== Washington ==
1934 United States Senate election in Washington
- November 6, 1934
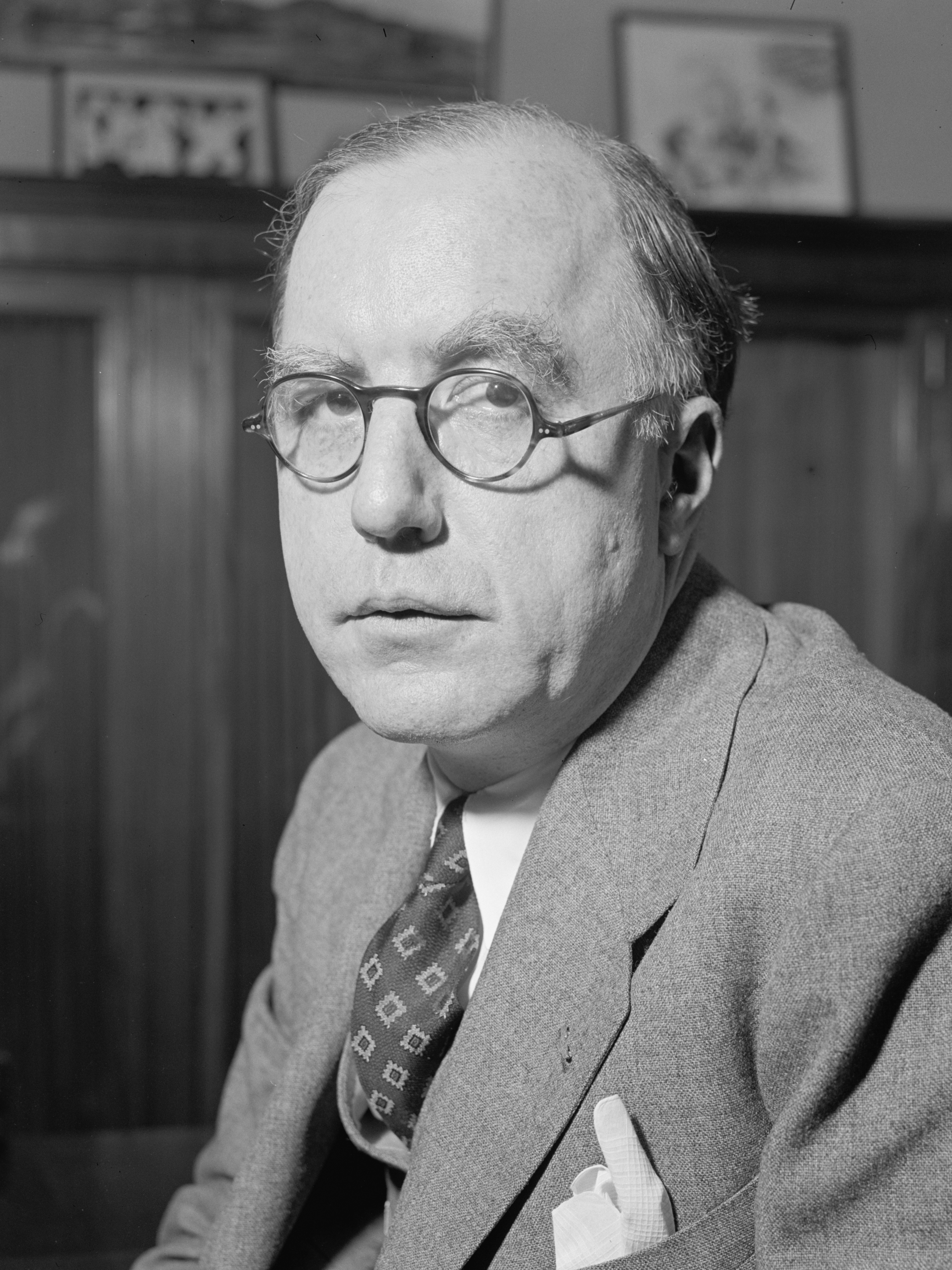

Nominee	Lewis Schwellenbach	Reno Odlin
Party	Democratic	Republican
Popular vote	302,606	168,994
Percentage	60.93%	34.02%
- County results Schwellenbach: 50–60% 60–70% Tie: 40–50%
U.S. senator before election
Clarence Dill
Democratic
Elected U.S. Senator
Lewis Schwellenbach
Democratic

1934 United States Senate election in Washington
Party	Candidate	Votes	%
Democratic	Lewis B. Schwellenbach	302,606	60.92%
Republican	Reno Odlin	168,994	34.02%
Cincinnatus Nonpartisan Movement	William J. Wilkins	11,866	2.39%
Socialist	John F. McKay	7,192	1.45%
Communist	George Edward Bradley	3,470	0.70%
Prohibition	Chester H. Thompson	1,551	0.31%
Socialist Labor	Edward Kriz	556	0.11%
Washington State American Liberty League	Glen S. Corkery	453	0.09%
Majority		133,612	26.90%
Turnout		496,688	
Democratic hold			

== West Virginia ==
1934 United States Senate election in West Virginia
- November 6, 1934
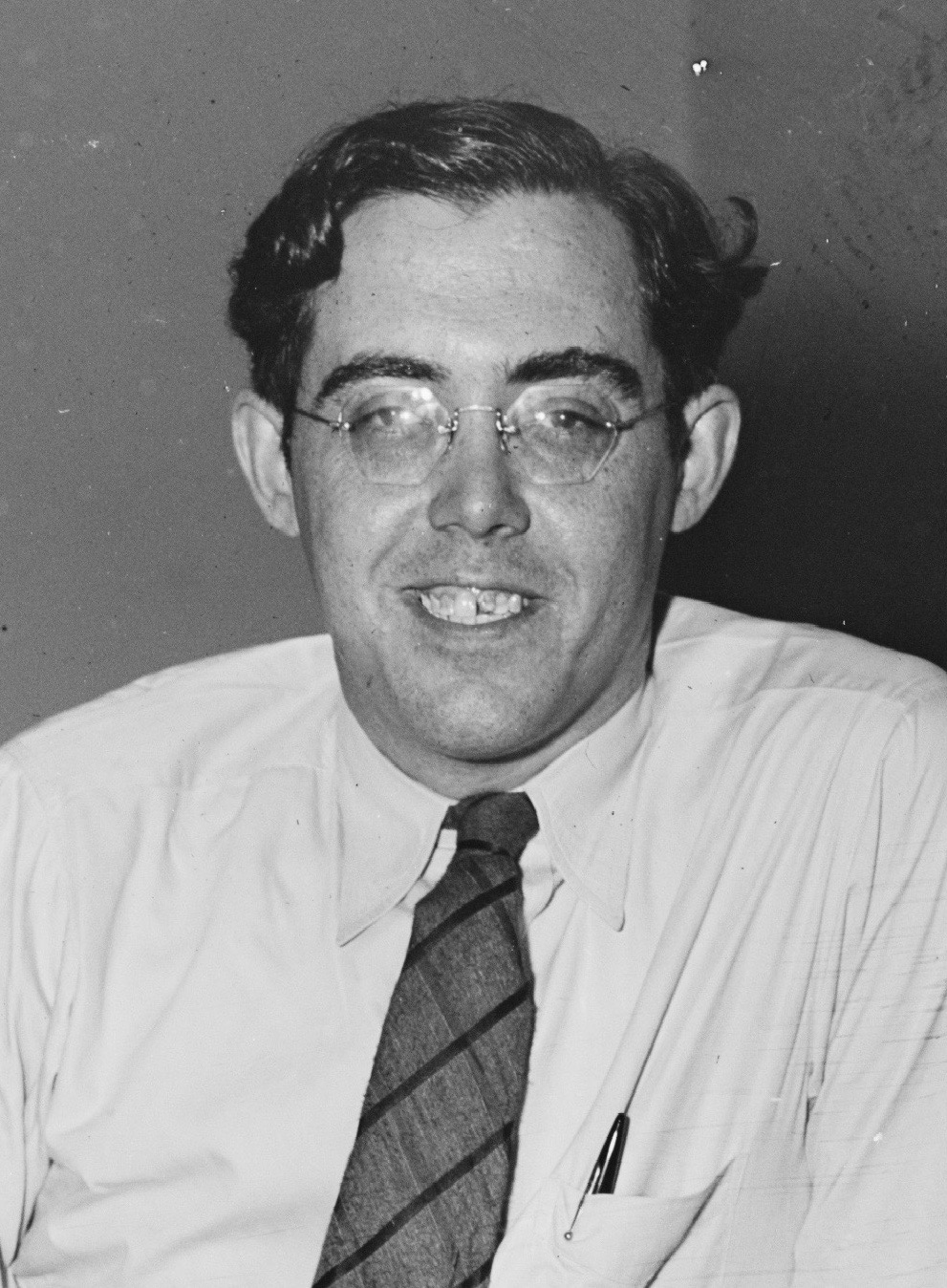

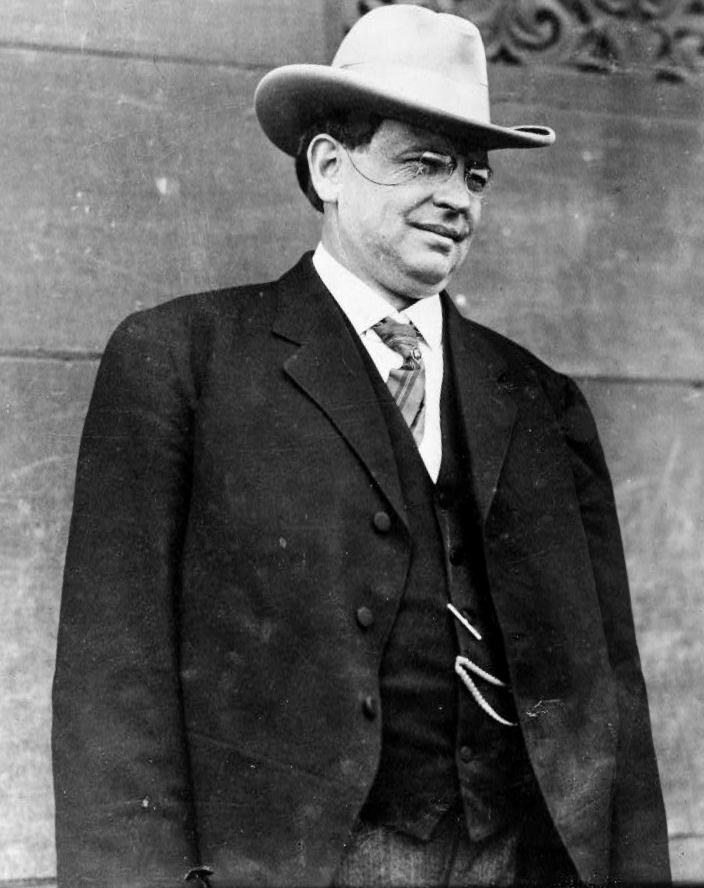
Nominee	Rush Holt Sr.	Henry D. Hatfield
Party	Democratic	Republican
Popular vote	349,882	281,756
Percentage	55.14%	44.40%
- County results Holt: 50–60% 60–70% Hatfield: 40–50% 50–60% 60–70% 70–80%
U.S. senator before election
Henry D. Hatfield
Republican
Elected U.S. Senator
Rush Holt Sr.
Democratic

1934 United States Senate election in West Virginia
Party	Candidate	Votes	%
Democratic	Rush Holt Sr.	349,882	55.14%
Republican	Henry D. Hatfield (incumbent)	281,756	44.40%
Prohibition	John Wesley McDonald	2,931	0.46%
Majority		68,126	10.74%
Turnout		634,569	
Democratic gain from Republican			

== Wisconsin ==
1934 United States Senate election in Wisconsin
- November 6, 1934
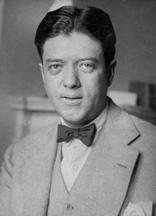

Nominee	Robert La Follette Jr.	John M. Callahan	John B. Chapple
Party	Progressive	Democratic	Republican
Popular vote	440,513	223,438	210,569
Percentage	47.78%	24.24%	22.84%
- County results La Follete Jr.: 30–40% 40–50% 50–60% 60–70% Callahan: 30–40% 40–50% Chapple: 30–40% 40–50%
U.S. senator before election
Robert La Follette Jr.
Republican
Elected U.S. Senator
Robert La Follette Jr.
Progressive

1934 United States Senate election in Wisconsin
Party	Candidate	Votes	%
Progressive	Robert M. La Follette Jr. (incumbent)	440,513	47.78%
Democratic	John M. Callahan	223,438	24.24%
Republican	John B. Chapple	210,569	22.84%
Socialist	James P. Sheehan	44,453	4.82%
Independent Communist	Fern Dobbins	2,127	0.23%
Independent Prohibition	Theodore Lee	826	0.09%
None	Scattering	23	0.00%
Majority		217,075	23.54%
Turnout		921,949	
Progressive gain from Republican			

== Wyoming ==
1934 United States Senate elections in Wyoming
- November 6, 1934
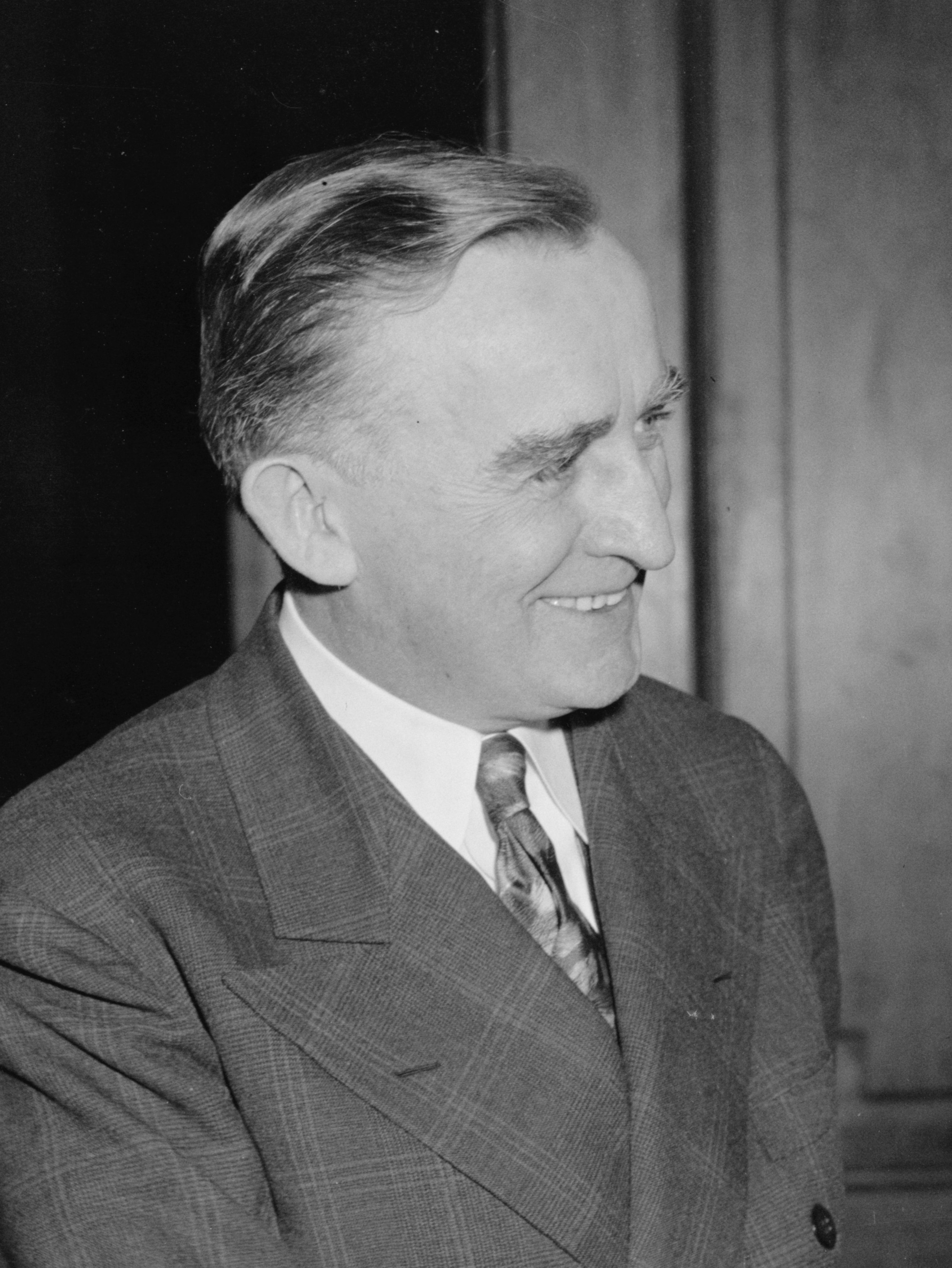

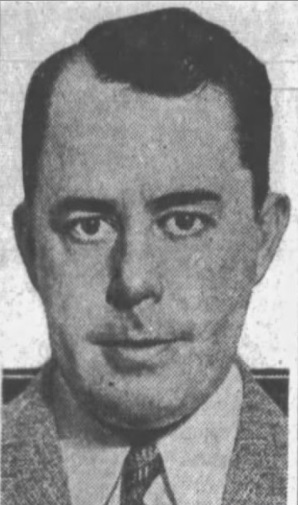
Nominee	Joseph C. O'Mahoney	Vincent Carter
Party	Democratic	Republican
Popular vote	53,806	40,819
Percentage	56.62%	42.96%
- County results O'Mahoney: 50–60% 60–70% Carter: 50–60% 60–70%
U.S. senator before election
Joseph C. O'Mahoney
Democratic
Elected U.S. Senator
Joseph C. O'Mahoney
Democratic

There were two elections to the same seat due to the November 3, 1933 death of Democrat John B. Kendrick. Democrat Joseph C. O'Mahoney was appointed to continue the term, pending a special election. O'Mahoney won both the special election and the regular election to the next term.

=== Wyoming (regular) ===
1934 United States Senate election in Wyoming
Party	Candidate	Votes	%	±%
Democratic	Joseph C. O'Mahoney (inc.)	53,806	56.62%	+3.13%
Republican	Vincent Carter	40,819	42.96%	−3.14%
Socialist	Joseph N. Lunn	401	0.42%	+0.01%
Majority		12,987	13.67%	+6.26%
Turnout		95,026		
Democratic hold				

=== Wyoming (special) ===
1934 United States Senate special election in Wyoming
Party	Candidate	Votes	%	±%
Democratic	Joseph C. O'Mahoney (inc.)	53,859	56.88%	+3.39%
Republican	Vincent Carter	40,825	43.12%	−2.97%
Majority		13,034	13.77%	+6.36%
Turnout		94,684		
Democratic hold				

O'Mahoney would be re-elected twice and serve until his 1952 defeat.

== See also ==
- 1934 United States elections
  - 1934 United States House of Representatives elections
- 73rd United States Congress
- 74th United States Congress
