= 1937 New York City mayoral election =

- November 2, 1937
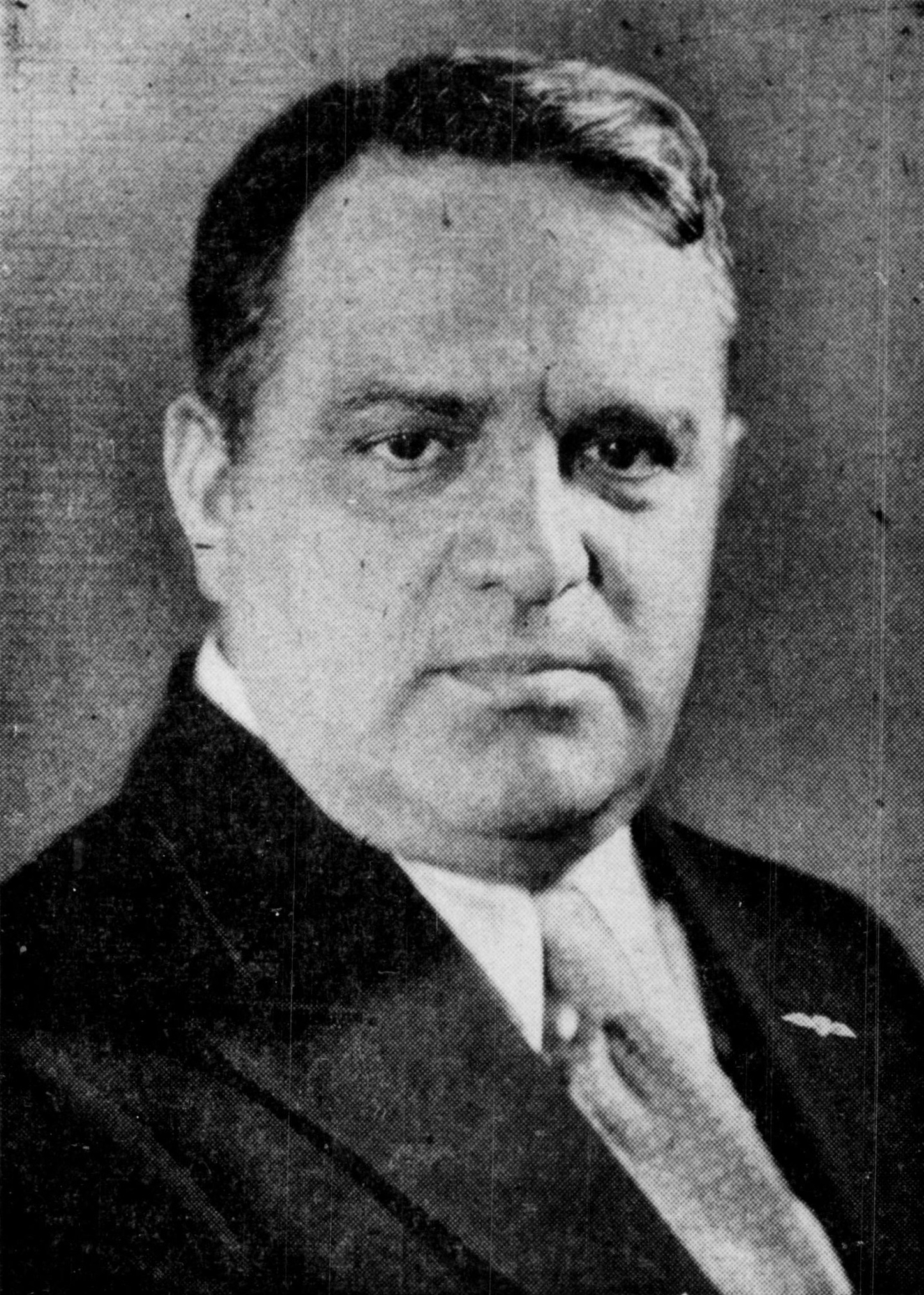

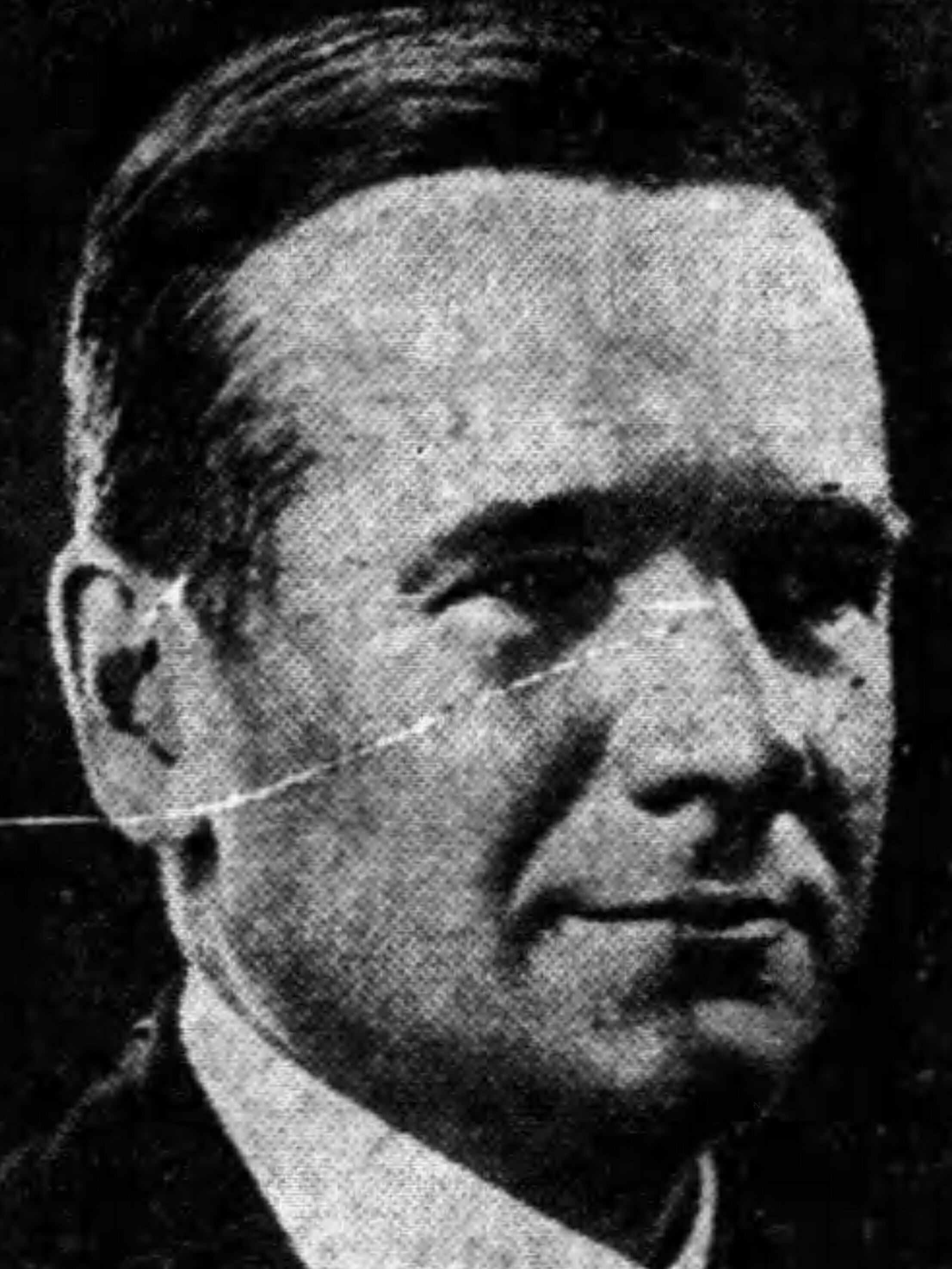
Candidate	Fiorello La Guardia	Jeremiah T. Mahoney
Party	Republican	Democratic
Alliance	American Labor; City Fusion; Ind. Progressive	Trades Union; Anti-Communist
Popular vote	1,344,630	890,756
Percentage	60.1%	39.8%
- Borough results LaGuardia: 50–60% 60–70%
Mayor before election
Fiorello La Guardia
Republican
Elected mayor
Fiorello La Guardia
Republican

The 1937 New York City mayoral election took place on November 2, 1937. Incumbent Fiorello La Guardia was reelected with 60 percent of the vote, defeating Democratic candidate Jeremiah T. Mahoney. La Guardia was nominated by the Republican Party and the American Labor Party and also ran on the City Fusion and Independent Progressive ballot lines, while Mahoney ran on the Trade Union and Anti-Communist ballot lines.

Primaries were held on Thursday, September 16. U.S. senator Royal S. Copeland ran in both the Republican and Democratic primaries with the support of Tammany Hall as a critic of the New Deal, but he lost both to primaries to New Deal supporters, La Guardia and Mahoney, respectively.

As of 2026, this is the last time a Republican candidate for New York City mayor carried all five boroughs.

== Republican primary ==
=== Candidates ===
- Royal S. Copeland, U.S. senator from New York since 1923 (also running as Democrat)
- Fiorello La Guardia, incumbent mayor since 1934

==== Withdrew ====
- Thomas J. Curran, minority leader of the New York City Board of Aldermen

=== Results ===
1937 Republican mayoral primary
Party	Candidate	Votes	%
Republican	Fiorello La Guardia (incumbent)	81,667	63.54%
Democratic	Royal S. Copeland	46,853	36.46%
Total votes		128,520	100.00%

== Democratic primary ==
=== Candidates ===
- Royal S. Copeland, U.S. senator from New York since 1923 (also running as Republican)
- Jeremiah T. Mahoney, president of the Amateur Athletic Union and former New York Supreme Court judge
- Fiorello La Guardia, incumbent mayor since 1934 (write-in)

==== Withdrew ====
- Samuel Levy, Manhattan borough president (endorsed Copeland, ran for City Council president)
- Grover A. Whalen, president of the World's Fair Corporation and former New York City Police Commissioner (endorsed Mahoney)

==== Declined ====
- John P. O'Brien, former mayor
- Jimmy Walker, former mayor

=== Results ===
1937 Democratic mayoral primary
Party	Candidate	Votes	%
Democratic	Jeremiah T. Mahoney	417,980	58.14%
Democratic	Royal S. Copeland	243,880	33.92%
Republican	Fiorello La Guardia (inc., write-in)	57,092	7.94%
Total votes		718,952	100.00%

== General election ==
=== Candidates ===
- Fiorello La Guardia, incumbent mayor since 1934 (Republican, American Labor, City Fusion, and Independent Progressive)
- Jeremiah T. Mahoney, president of the Amateur Athletic Union and former New York Supreme Court judge (Democratic, Anti-Communist and Trade Union)

=== Results ===
1937 New York City mayoral election
Party	Candidate	Votes	%	±%
Republican	Fiorello La Guardia (incumbent)	672,823	30.12%	▲9.45
American Labor	Fiorello La Guardia (incumbent)	482,459	21.60%	N/A
City Fusion	Fiorello La Guardia (incumbent)	159,895	7.16%	▼12.44
Ind. Progressive	Fiorello La Guardia (incumbent)	28,839	1.27%	N/A
Total	Fiorello La Guardia (incumbent)	1,344,016	60.17%	▲19.79
Democratic	Jeremiah T. Mahoney	875,942	39.22%	▲12.95
Trades Union	Jeremiah T. Mahoney	7,163	0.32%	N/A
Anti-Communist	Jeremiah T. Mahoney	6,486	0.29%	N/A
Total	Jeremiah T. Mahoney	889,591	39.83%	N/A
Total votes		2,233,607	100.00%	
