= 1937 New York City Council presidential election =

- November 7, 1937
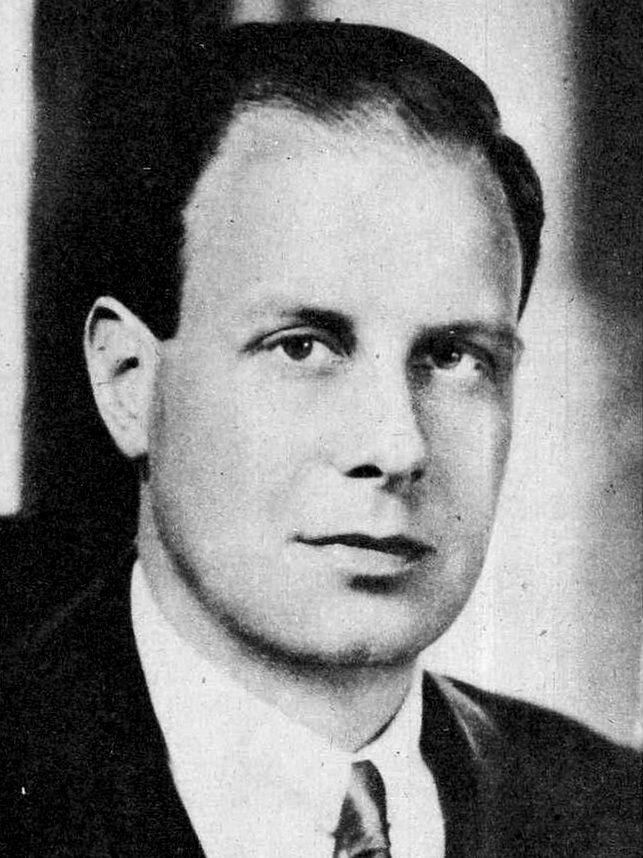

| Nominee | Newbold Morris | Max J. Schneider |
| Party | Republican | Democratic |
| Alliance | City Fusion; American Labor; Ind. Progressive | Trade Union; Anti-Communist |
| Popular vote | 1,139,568 | 916,563 |
| Percentage | 55.4% | 44.6% |
President of the Board of Aldermen before election
William F. Brunner
Democratic
Elected President of the Board of Aldermen
Newbold Morris
Republican

An election was held on November 7, 1937, to elect the first President of the New York City Council. Republican Newbold Morris was elected over Democrat Max J. Schneider.

== Background ==
Bernard S. Deutsch was elected president of the Board of Aldermen in 1933, but he died in office on November 21, 1935. He was succeeded by Timothy J. Sullivan, who did not seek re-election to the renamed post. In a 1936 special election to complete Deutsch's term, William F. Brunner was elected.

== Democratic primary ==
=== Candidates ===
- Samuel Levy, Manhattan Borough President (also running as Republican with Royal S. Copeland)
- Max J. Schneider, president of the National Safety Bank and Trust Company and the Textile Refinishers Association (running with Jeremiah T. Mahoney)

=== Results ===
1937 Democratic City Council presidential primary
| Party | Candidate | Votes | % |
|---|---|---|---|
| Democratic | Max J. Schneider | 378,267 | 56.73% |
| Democratic | Samuel Levy | 288,567 | 43.27% |
| Total votes | | 666,834 | 100.00% |

== Republican primary ==
=== Candidates ===
- Samuel Levy, Manhattan Borough President (also running as Democrat with Royal S. Copeland)
- Newbold Morris, member of the Board of Aldermen (running with Fiorello La Guardia)

=== Results ===
1937 Republican City Council presidential primary
| Party | Candidate | Votes | % |
|---|---|---|---|
| Republican | Newbold Morris | 78,129 | 68.13% |
| Democratic | Samuel Levy | 36,753 | 31.67% |
| Total votes | | 114,682 | 100.00% |

== General election ==
=== Candidates ===
- Newbold Morris, member of the Board of Aldermen (Republican, City Fusion, American Labor and Progressive)
- Max J. Schneider, president of the National Safety Bank and Trust Company and the Textile Refinishers Association (Democratic, Trades Union and Anti-Communist)

=== Results ===
1937 New York City Council presidential election
| Party | Candidate | Votes | % | ±% |
|---|---|---|---|---|
| Republican | Newbold Morris | 1,139,568 | 55.42% | |
| Democratic | Max J. Schneider | 916,563 | 44.58% | |
| Total votes | | 2,056,131 | 100.00% | |
