= William Henry Hughes =

William Henry Hughes may refer to:

- Bill Hughes (musician) (1930–2018), American jazz trombonist and bandleader
- William H. Hughes (1864–1903), American businessman and politician from New York
