= James S. Parker =

American politician

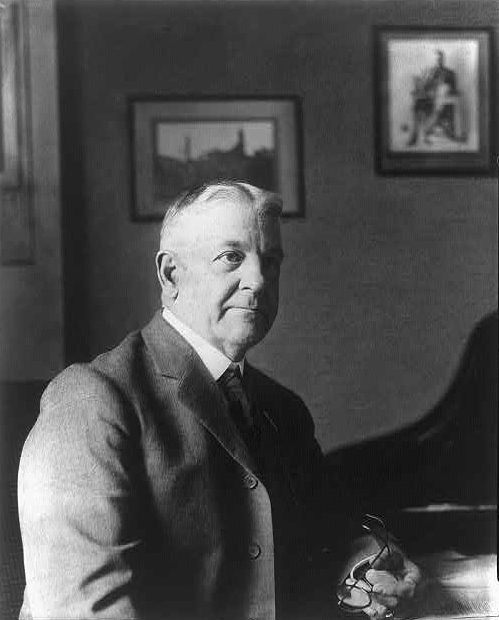

Member of the U.S. House of Representatives from New York's 29th district
- In office March 4, 1913 – December 19, 1933
- Preceded by: Michael E. Driscoll
- Succeeded by: William D. Thomas

Member of the New York State Assembly from the Washington County district
- In office January 1, 1904 – December 31, 1905
- Preceded by: William H. Hughes
- Succeeded by: Eugene R. Norton
- In office January 1, 1908 – December 31, 1912
- Preceded by: Eugene R. Norton
- Succeeded by: Eugene R. Norton

Personal details
- Born: June 3, 1867 Great Barrington, Massachusetts
- Died: December 19, 1933 (aged 66) Washington, D.C.
- Resting place: Evergreen Cemetery, Salem
- Party: Republican
- Education: Cornell University

James Southworth Parker (June 3, 1867 – December 19, 1933) was a United States representative from New York.

== Life ==
Born in Great Barrington, Berkshire County, Massachusetts, he attended the public schools and was graduated from Cornell University in 1887. He taught at St. Paul's School in Concord, New Hampshire in 1887 and moved to Salem, Washington County, New York in 1888 and taught at St. Paul's School at Salem. He began farming in Salem in 1898. He was also interested in breeding harness racing horses.

He was a member of the New York State Assembly (Washington Co.) in 1904, 1905, 1908, 1909, 1910, 1911 and 1912. There he was allied with the opponents of the policies of Charles Evans Hughes.

Parker was elected as a Republican to the Sixty-third and to the ten succeeding Congresses, holding office from March 4, 1913, until his death on December 19, 1933. While in the House, he was Chairman of the Committee on Interstate and Foreign Commerce during the Sixty-ninth through Seventy-first Congresses.

He and Senator Charles McNary of Oregon introduced a bill in 1930 to give mail contract subsidies for transoceanic trip to American dirigibles.

He was married twice: first in 1899 to Marian Williams, who died in 1923; second to Amy Glidden, two years after his first wife's death. He had 6 children. He died on December 19, 1933, in Washington, D.C., and was buried at the Evergreen Cemetery in Salem, NY.

== See also ==
- List of members of the United States Congress who died in office (1900–1949)

New York State Assembly
Preceded by William H. Hughes	New York State Assembly; Washington County; 1904–1905	Succeeded by Eugene R. Norton
Preceded by Eugene R. Norton	New York State Assembly; Washington County; 1908–1912	Succeeded by Eugene R. Norton
U.S. House of Representatives
Preceded by Michael E. Driscoll	Member of the U.S. House of Representatives from New York's 29th congressional district 1913–1933	Succeeded by William D. Thomas
