= SS Alanson B. Houghton =

World War II Liberty ship of the United States

History

United States
- Name: Alanson B. Houghton
- Namesake: Alanson B. Houghton
- Owner: War Shipping Administration (WSA)
- Operator: American South African Lines, Inc.
- Ordered: as type (EC2-S-C1) hull, MC hull 2293
- Builder: J.A. Jones Construction, Panama City, Florida
- Cost: $1,023,016
- Yard number: 34
- Way number: 1
- Laid down: 19 January 1944
- Launched: 14 March 1944
- Sponsored by: Mrs. H.R. Pratt
- Completed: 15 April 1944
- Identification: Call Signal: KWJZ
- Fate: Laid up in National Defense Reserve Fleet, Mobile, Alabama, 14 October 1949; Sold for scrapping, 28 October 1971

General characteristics
- Class & type: Liberty ship; type EC2-S-C1, standard
- Tonnage: 10,865 LT DWT; 7,176 GRT
- Displacement: 3,380 long tons (3,434 t) (light); 14,245 long tons (14,474 t) (max)
- Length: 441 feet 6 inches (135 m) oa; 416 feet (127 m) pp; 427 feet (130 m) lwl
- Beam: 57 feet (17 m)
- Draft: 27 ft 9.25 in (8.4646 m)
- Installed power: 2 × Oil fired 450 °F (232 °C) boilers, operating at 220 psi (1,500 kPa); 2,500 hp (1,900 kW)
- Propulsion: 1 × triple-expansion steam engine, (manufactured by General Machinery Corp., Hamilton, Ohio); 1 × screw propeller
- Speed: 11.5 knots (21.3 km/h; 13.2 mph)
- Capacity: 562,608 cubic feet (15,931 m^{3}) (grain); 499,573 cubic feet (14,146 m^{3}) (bale)
- Complement: 38–62 USMM; 21–40 USNAG
- Armament: Varied by ship; Bow-mounted 3-inch (76 mm)/50-caliber gun; Stern-mounted 4-inch (102 mm)/50-caliber gun; 2–8 × single 20-millimeter (0.79 in) Oerlikon anti-aircraft (AA) cannons and/or, 2–8 × 37-millimeter (1.46 in) M1 AA guns

SS Alanson B. Houghton was a Liberty ship built in the United States during World War II. She was named after Alanson B. Houghton, the vice president and later president of Corning Glass Works, a member of the United States House of Representatives from New York (1919–1922), the United States Ambassador to Germany (1922–1925), United States Ambassador to the United Kingdom (1925–1929), and a member of the Jekyll Island Club.

== Construction ==
Alanson B. Houghton was laid down on 19 January 1944, under a United States Maritime Commission (MARCOM) contract, MC hull 2293, by J.A. Jones Construction, Panama City, Florida; sponsored by Mrs. H.R. Pratt, she was launched on 14 March 1944.

== History ==
She was allocated to American South African Lines, Inc., on 15 April 1944. On 14 October 1949, she was laid up in the National Defense Reserve Fleet, in Mobile, Alabama. On 28 October 1971, she was sold, along with 13 other ships, for $513,000 to Union Minerals and Alloys Corporation, for scrapping. She was removed from the fleet 25 October 1972.

== Bibliography ==
- "Jones Construction, Panama City FL". ShipbuildingHistory.com. 13 October 2010.
- "Liberty Ships – World War II".
- Maritime Administration. "Alanson B. Houghton". Ship History Database Vessel Status Card. U.S. Department of Transportation, Maritime Administration. Archived from the original on 12 December 2019.
- Davies, James (May 2004). "Specifications (As-Built)" (PDF). p. 23.
- "SS Alanson B. Houghton".
