= Robert Baker (New York politician) =

American politician

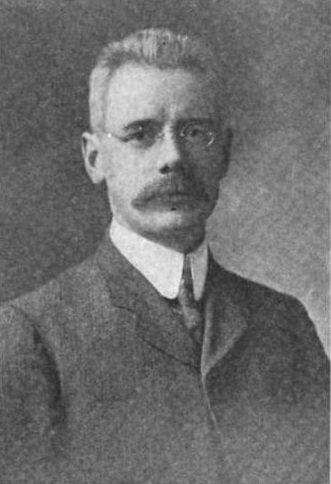

Member of the U.S. House of Representatives from New York's 6th district
- In office March 4, 1903 – March 3, 1905
- Preceded by: George H. Lindsay
- Succeeded by: William M. Calder

Personal details
- Born: April 1862 Bury St. Edmunds, Suffolk, England, U.K.
- Died: June 15, 1943 (aged 81) Brooklyn, New York, U.S.
- Resting place: Cemetery of the Evergreens, Brooklyn, New York
- Citizenship: United States
- Party: Democratic
- Spouse: Gertrude A. Zoller (m. 1887)
- Occupation: Businessman

Robert Baker (April 1862 – June 15, 1943) was an American businessman and politician who served one term as a U.S. representative from New York from 1903 to 1905.

== Biography ==
Born at Bury St. Edmunds, Suffolk, England, U.K. in April 1862, Baker attended the common schools. He immigrated to the United States in 1882, and settled in Albany, New York. He married Gertrude A. Zoller of Albany in October 1887. In 1887, he was elected secretary of the Albany Single Tax Club.

== Career ==
Baker moved to Brooklyn, in 1889. A prominent reformer and follower of the single tax theories of Henry George, in 1891 he was elected president of the Brooklyn Single Tax League. Also in 1891, Baker was elected secretary of the Brooklyn Ballot Reform League. From 1893 to 1898, he was a national committee member of the Single Tax League of the United States.

In 1894, Baker was an unsuccessful candidate for the New York State Assembly. In 1896, he was an active supporter of William Jennings Bryan and gave several campaign speeches on his behalf. In 1897, he was a campaign speaker for Henry George during George's second campaign for mayor of New York City. He was a founding member of the Citizens Union in 1897, and served as its secretary. In March 1902, he was appointed an auditor in the office of the New York City Comptroller, a position he reportedly received from Democratic Party leaders in exchange for withdrawing his candidacy for sheriff.

=== Congress ===
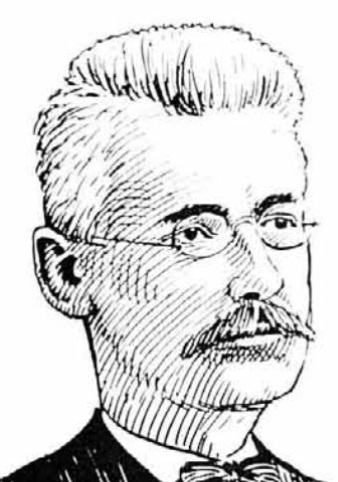
Baker in 1903

In 1902, Baker was elected to the United States House of Representatives as a Democrat. He represented New York's 6th district in the 58th Congress, March 4, 1903 to March 3, 1905. He was an unsuccessful candidate for a second term in 1904, and his single term was marked with controversy as Baker stayed true to his reformist philosophy. He quickly earned the nicknames "No Pass" and "Anti-Pass" for declining the free railroad passes that were then regularly handed out to legislators by the B & O Railroad.

A pacifist, he refused to nominate candidates from his district for appointment to the United States Military Academy and United States Naval Academy. In addition, he offered an unsuccessful resolution that would have condemned the "Bloody Sunday" massacre in St. Petersburg, Russia, in which the Tsar's imperial guard fired upon unarmed demonstrators who wanted to present a petition advocating for improved working conditions and higher wages. A figure of frequent ridicule in the Brooklyn press, he was an unsuccessful candidate for reelection in 1904 to the 59th Congress and was the unsuccessful Democratic candidate for election in 1906 to the 60th Congress.

=== Later career ===
In 1905, an extended illness that resisted treatment caused Baker to became an adherent of Christian Science. Baker was appointed secretary of the New York City Department of Docks and Ferries in February 1906. He resigned after three days because the department's commissioner indicated that as a condition of his employment, Baker would be prohibited from public speaking. Later in life he reversed his pacifist philosophy, and became a strong proponent of war with Nazi Germany, writing poems and letters to the Brooklyn Eagle in support of the cause. He also began a successful business career, including serving as president of the Austin Rotary Engine Company and the DeLany Separator Company, as well as vice president of Brooklyn's Realty Redemption Company.

== Death and burial ==
Baker died in Brooklyn on June 15, 1943. He was buried at Cemetery of the Evergreens in Brooklyn, Nazareth Section, Lot 936.

U.S. House of Representatives
| Preceded by George H. Lindsay | Member of the U.S. House of Representatives from New York's 6th congressional district March 4, 1903 – March 3, 1905 | Succeeded by William M. Calder |
