= William M. Calder =

American politician (1869–1945)

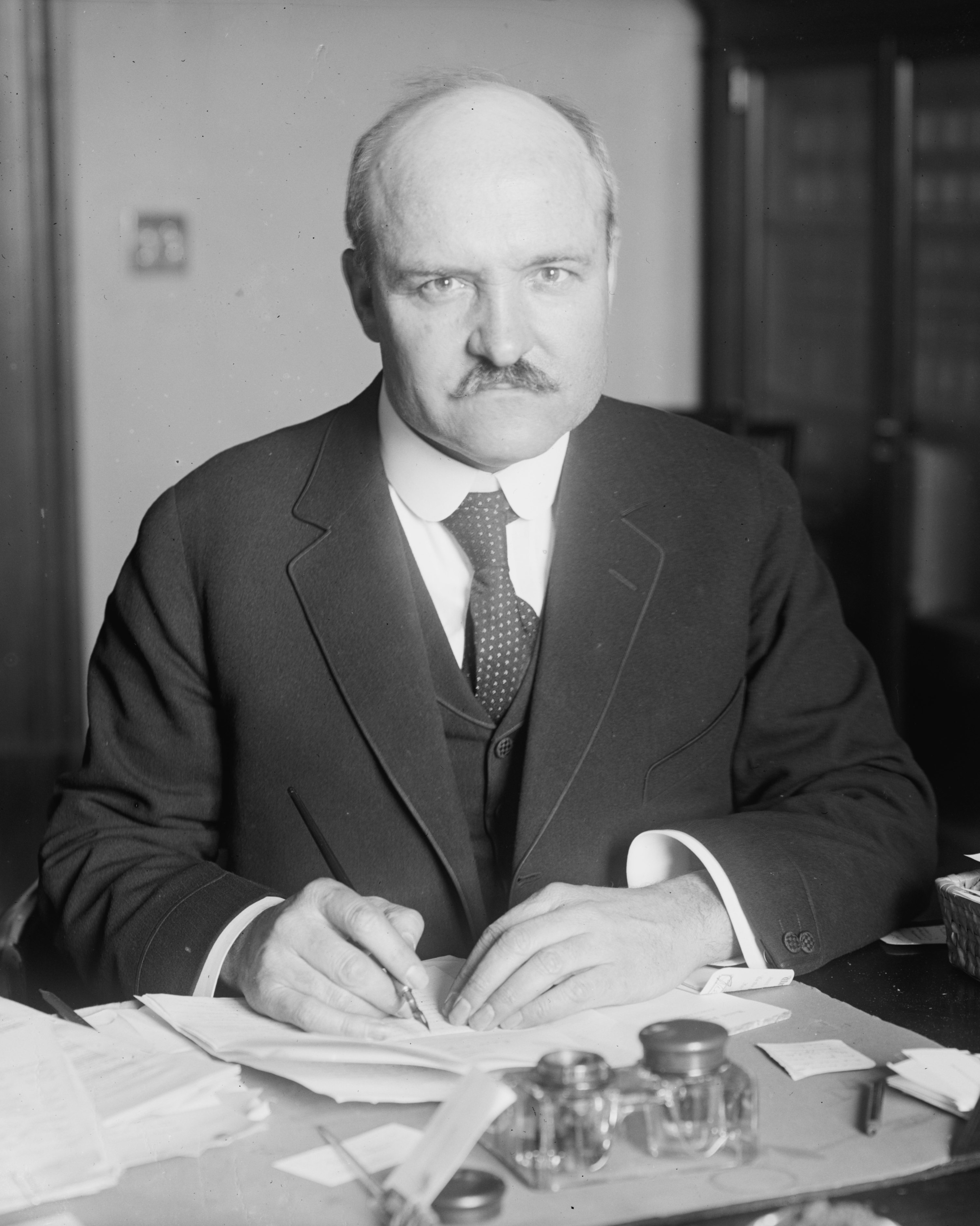
- Calder in 1917

United States Senator from New York
- In office March 4, 1917 – March 3, 1923
- Preceded by: James Aloysius O'Gorman
- Succeeded by: Royal S. Copeland

Member of the U.S. House of Representatives from New York's 6th district
- In office March 4, 1905 – March 3, 1915
- Preceded by: Robert Baker
- Succeeded by: Frederick W. Rowe

Personal details
- Born: March 3, 1869 Brooklyn, New York, U.S.
- Died: March 3, 1945 (aged 76) Brooklyn, New York, U.S.
- Party: Republican
- Spouse: Catherine E. Harloe
- Children: 2

William Musgrave Calder I (March 3, 1869 – March 3, 1945) was an American politician and architect who served as a member of both chambers of the United States Congress from New York.

== Early life and education ==
He was born in Brooklyn on March 3, 1869, to Susan Calder (née Ryan) and Alexander G. Calder, a carpenter and building contractor. He trained as a carpenter and attended night classes at Cooper Union.

== Career ==
Calder went into business as a builder and architect, most notably in the Park Slope and Flatbush neighborhoods of Brooklyn. In this capacity, he developed the "Calder House," a semi-detached two-family structure that was widely adopted in the latter district. From 1902 until his death, Calder resided in the former district at 551 1st Street, a limestone townhouse built by competitor William Flanagan.

He served as the Borough of Brooklyn building commissioner from 1902 to 1903. He represented New York as a Republican in the United States House of Representatives from 1905 until 1915. In 1914, he lost the Republican primary for the United States Senate to James Wolcott Wadsworth Jr. In 1916, he won the Republican primary, defeating Robert Bacon, and was elected to the Senate over Democratic National Committee chairman William F. McCombs in the general election. He served one term, from 1917 to 1923. During his tenure, he became well known as the sponsor of the Standard Time Act in 1918 (also known as the Calder Act), the first U.S. law implementing standard time and daylight saving time in the United States. In 1922, he was defeated for re-election by Democrat Royal S. Copeland. After leaving Congress he continued to be active in the building trade and financial institutions.

== Personal life ==
In 1893, he married Catherine E. Harloe. His children were Elsie Calder, who married to Rear Admiral Robert C. Lee, and William M. Calder II. He died on March 3, 1945, which was his 76th birthday.

== Legacy ==
His papers are held in a number of archives including: Herbert Hoover Presidential Library; the New York Historical Society; and Yale University. His grandson, William Musgrave Calder III, was professor emeritus of classics at the University of Illinois at Urbana–Champaign.

Party political offices
First	Republican nominee for U.S. Senator from New York (Class 1); 1916, 1922	Succeeded by Alanson B. Houghton
U.S. House of Representatives
Preceded by Robert Baker	Member of the U.S. House of Representatives from New York's 6th congressional district 1905–1915	Succeeded by Frederick W. Rowe
U.S. Senate
Preceded by James A. O'Gorman	U.S. senator (Class 1) from New York; 1917–1923; Served alongside: James W. Wadsworth Jr.	Succeeded by Royal S. Copeland
