= Edwin S. Underhill =

American politician

Edwin Stewart Underhill
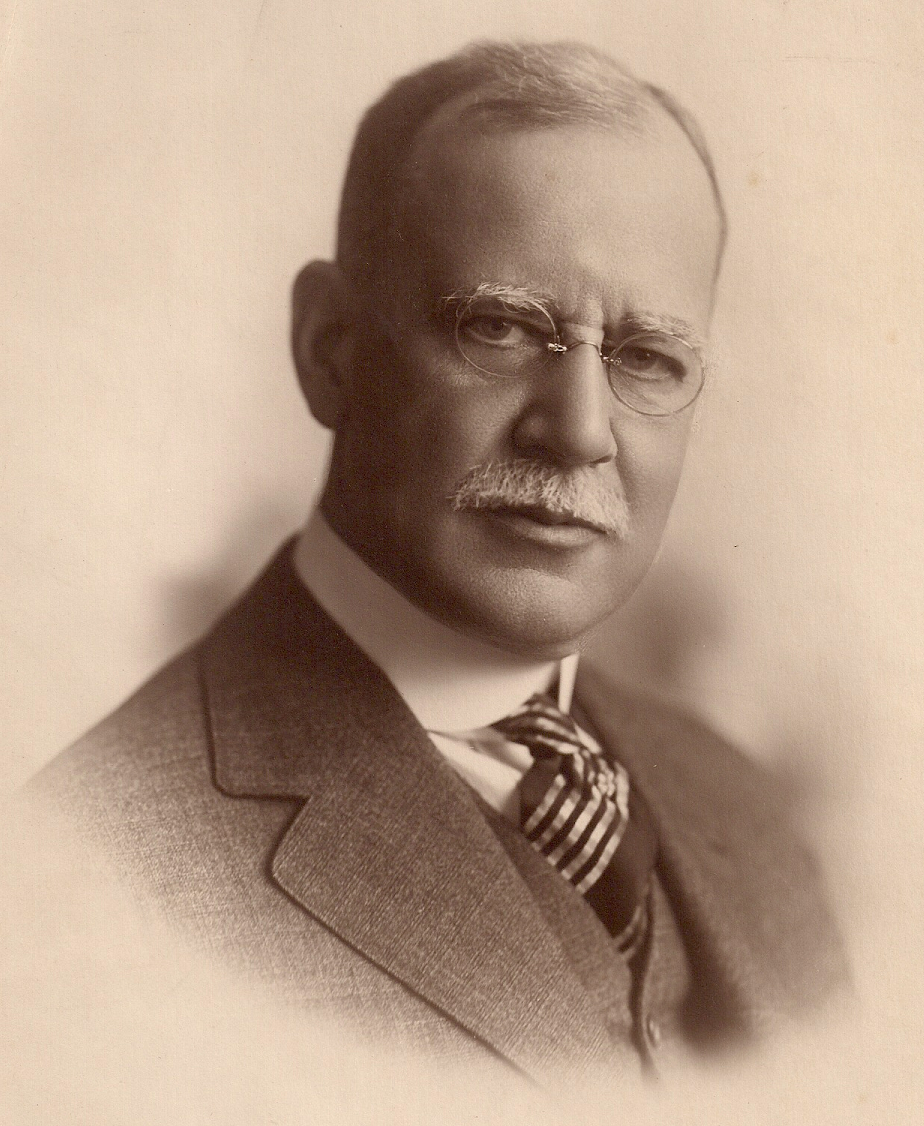

Member of the U.S. House of Representatives from New York
- In office March 4, 1911 – March 3, 1915
- Preceded by: J. Sloat Fassett
- Succeeded by: Harry H. Pratt
- Constituency: 33rd district (1911–1913); 37th district (1913–1915)

Personal details
- Born: October 7, 1861 Bath, New York, United States
- Died: February 7, 1929 (aged 67) Coopers Plains, New York, United States
- Cause of death: Automobile accident
- Resting place: Grove Cemetery, Bath, New York, United States
- Party: Democratic

Edwin Stewart Underhill (October 7, 1861 – February 7, 1929) was a U.S. representative from New York.

Born in Bath, New York, Underhill attended the common schools of his native city and Haverling High School at Bath. He graduated from Yale College in 1881.

He died as the result of an automobile accident in Coopers Plains, New York, February 7, 1929. He was interred in Grove Cemetery, Bath, New York.

== Political service ==
He served as presidential elector on the Democratic ticket in 1888.

Underhill was elected as a Democrat to the Sixty-second and Sixty-third Congresses (March 4, 1911 – March 3, 1915). He served as chairman of the Committee on Industrial Arts and Expositions (Sixty-third Congress). He was not a candidate for renomination in 1914.

He served as delegate to the Democratic National Convention at Houston, Texas, in 1928.

== Professional life ==
His father owned the Steuben Farmers' Advocate newspaper in Bath, and Edwin Underhill he served as editor there, and at the Canandaigua Messenger, before becoming editor and publisher of the Daily Democrat in Corning, New York, in 1899.

After his political service he returned to newspapers; he was publisher of the Democrat and its successor, The Evening Leader, until his death, and his descendants continued to run the newspaper until 1972.

He also engaged in banking, serving as vice president of the Farmers & Mechanics' Trust Co., Bath, New York.

== See also ==
- List of United States representatives from New York
- Politics of the United States

== Sources ==
- United States Congress. "Edwin S. Underhill (id: U000007)". Biographical Directory of the United States Congress.
- Peer, Dick. "The Leader: About Us". The Leader, Corning, New York. Retrieved May 23, 2012.

U.S. House of Representatives
Preceded by J. Sloat Fassett	Member of the U.S. House of Representatives from New York's 33rd congressional district 1911–1913	Succeeded by Charles A. Talcott
Preceded by Edward B. Vreeland	Member of the U.S. House of Representatives from New York's 37th congressional district 1913–1915	Succeeded by Harry H. Pratt
