= 1928 United States Senate election in New York =

- November 6, 1928
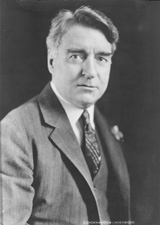

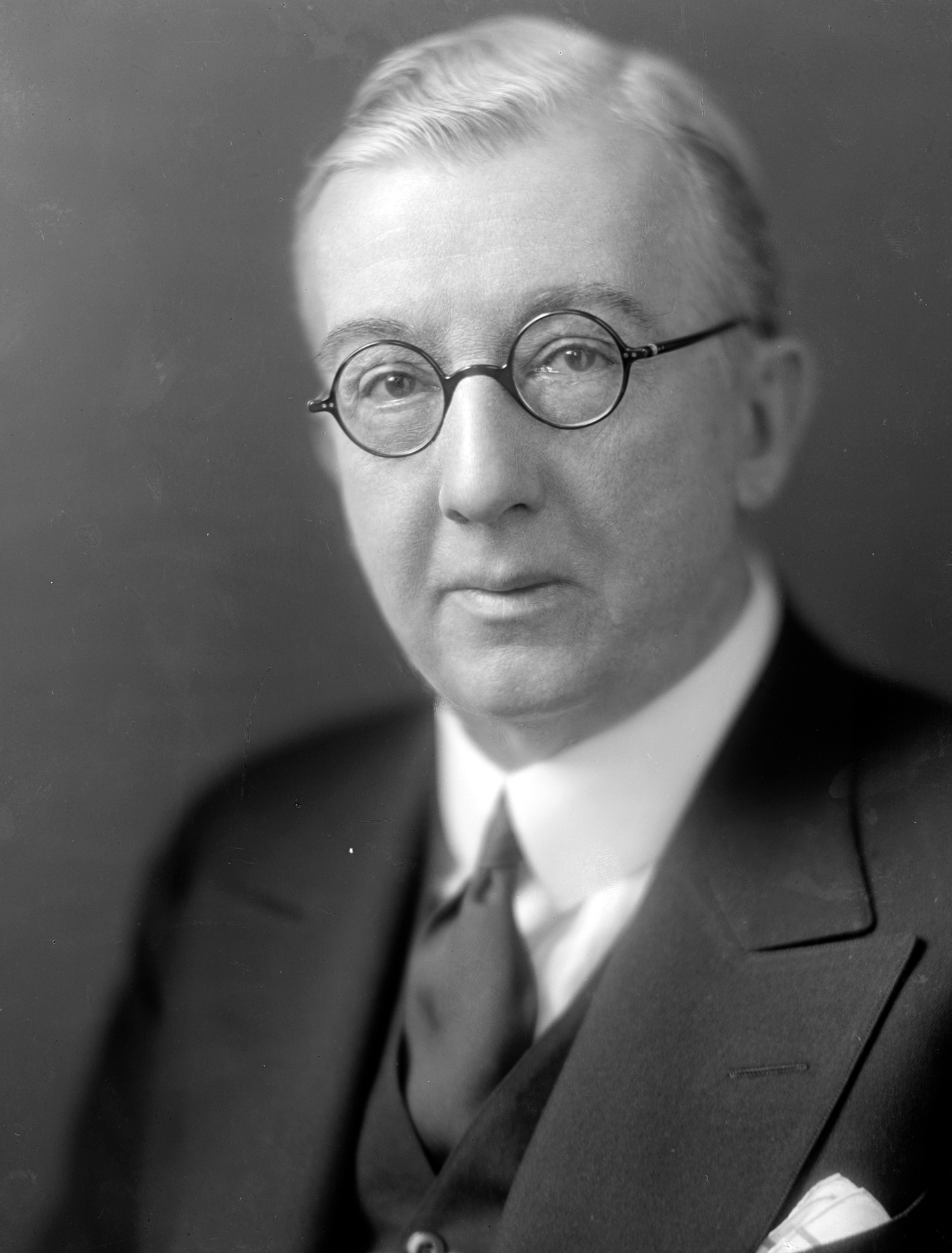
Nominee	Royal S. Copeland	Alanson B. Houghton
Party	Democratic	Republican
Popular vote	2,084,273	2,034,014
Percentage	49.08%	47.89%
- County results Copeland: 40–50% 50–60% 60–70% 70–80% Houghton: 50–60% 60–70% 70–80%
Senator before election
Royal S. Copeland
Democratic
Elected Senator
Royal S. Copeland
Democratic

The 1928 United States Senate election in New York was held on November 6, 1928. Incumbent Democratic Senator Royal S. Copeland was re-elected to a second term, defeating Republican Alanson B. Houghton.

== Democratic nomination ==
=== Candidates ===
- Royal S. Copeland, incumbent Senator since 1923

=== Convention ===
After speeches celebrating Copeland's support for tolerance for Catholics and immigration reform, his renomination was carried by acclamation.

== Republican nomination ==
=== Candidates ===
- George R. Fearon, State Senator from Onondaga County
- Alanson B. Houghton, U.S. Ambassador to the United Kingdom

=== Convention ===
1928 New York Republican convention
Party	Candidate	Votes	%
Republican	Alanson B. Houghton	911	88.45%
Republican	George R. Fearon	119	11.55%
Total votes		1,030	100.00%

== General election ==
=== Candidates ===
- McAlister Coleman, activist and author (Socialist)
- Royal S. Copeland, incumbent Senator (Democratic)
- Alanson B. Houghton, U.S. Ambassador to the United Kingdom (Republican)
- Henry Kuhn, perennial candidate (Socialist Labor)
- Robert Minor, cartoonist and journalist (Workers)

=== Results ===
1928 United States Senate election in New York
Party	Candidate	Votes	%	±%
Democratic	Royal S. Copeland (incumbent)	2,084,273	49.08%	▼3.52
Republican	Alanson B. Houghton	2,034,014	47.89%	▲6.88
Socialist	McAlister Coleman	111,208	2.62%	▼2.24
Workers	Robert Minor	11,956	0.28%	New
Socialist Labor	Henry Kuhn	5,543	0.13%	▼0.08
Total votes		4,246,994	100.00%	
