= Harry H. Pratt =

American politician

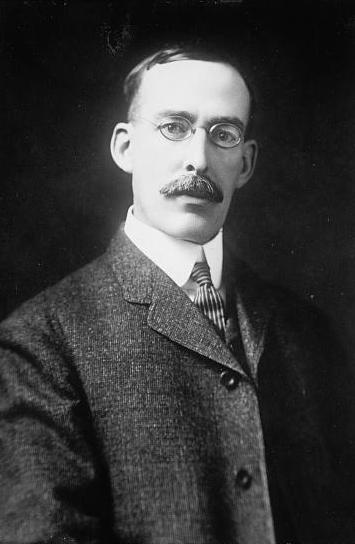

Member of the U.S. House of Representatives from New York's 37th district
- In office March 4, 1915 – March 3, 1919
- Preceded by: Edwin S. Underhill
- Succeeded by: Alanson B. Houghton

Personal details
- Born: November 11, 1864 Corning, New York, US
- Died: November 13, 1932 (aged 68) Corning, New York, US
- Resting place: Hope Cemetery
- Party: Republican

Harry Hayt Pratt (November 11, 1864 – November 13, 1932) was a U.S. representative from New York.

Born in Corning, New York, Pratt attended Corning Union School and graduated from Corning Free Academy in 1882. His family owned the Corning Weekly Journal, and Pratt served as associate editor from 1882 to 1891. When the paper shifted to seven day a week publication, Pratt was associate editor of the Corning Daily Journal from 1891 to 1906, and editor of the Daily Journal and manager of the Corning Journal Publishing Company from 1906 to 1919.

In 1892 he married Clarissa Chapman Spencer. They were the parents of six children: Sophie and George (twins); Hugh; Harriet; Ransom; and Helen. Pratt was active in the Masons and the Elks.

A Republican, he served in local offices including member of the board of health, and he attended numerous local, county, and state party conventions. He served as one of Corning's members of the Steuben County Board of Supervisors in 1898 and 1899. Pratt was assistant postmaster of Corning while his father served as postmaster; the younger Pratt was appointed postmaster on September 8, 1905 and served until January 27, 1914. He was a delegate to the Republican state conventions in 1908 and 1910.

He was elected as a Republican to the Sixty-fourth and Sixty-fifth Congresses (March 4, 1915 – March 3, 1919). He was an unsuccessful candidate for renomination in 1918.

After leaving Congress, Pratt engaged in publicity work for the United States Department of Labor and the War Risk Insurance Bureau from 1919 to 1921. He was a public relations counselor for the Erie Railroad Company from 1923 to 1928, and managing editor of the Erie Railroad Magazine. He also served as a director of the Corning Free Library and the Corning Chamber of Commerce.

He died in Corning on November 13, 1932, and was interred at Hope Cemetery in Corning.

== Sources ==
- United States Congress. "Harry H. Pratt (id: P000500)". Biographical Directory of the United States Congress.

U.S. House of Representatives
| Preceded by Edwin S. Underhill | Member of the U.S. House of Representatives from New York's 37th congressional district 1915–1919 | Succeeded by Alanson B. Houghton |
