= Alanson B. Houghton =

American politician (1863–1941)

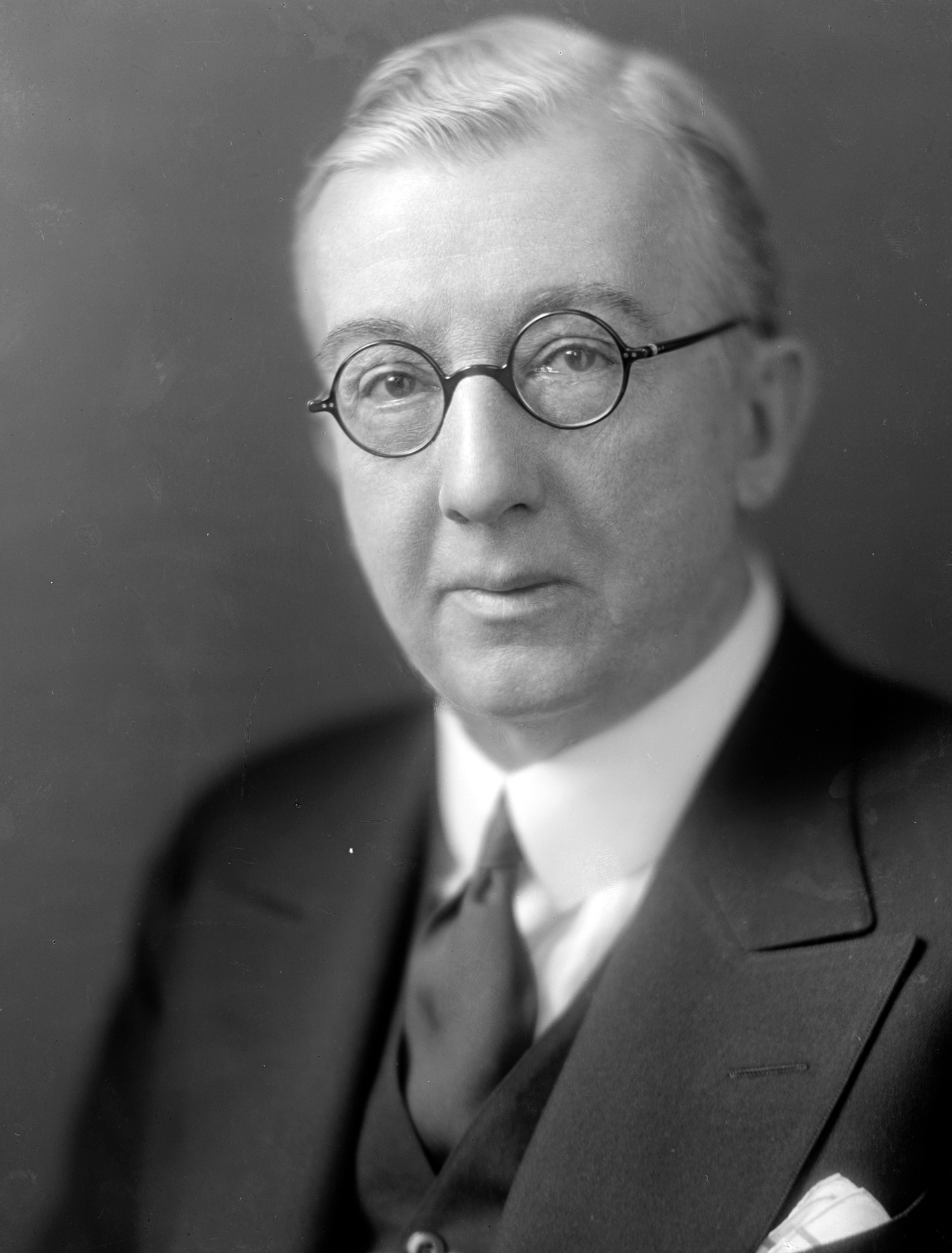
- Houghton, 1905–1941

40th United States Ambassador to the United Kingdom
- In office April 27, 1925 – March 28, 1929
- President: Calvin Coolidge; Herbert Hoover
- Preceded by: Frank B. Kellogg
- Succeeded by: Charles G. Dawes

United States Ambassador to Germany
- In office April 22, 1922 – February 21, 1925
- President: Warren G. Harding; Calvin Coolidge
- Preceded by: Ellis Loring Dresel (as Chargé d'Affaires)
- Succeeded by: Jacob Gould Schurman

Member of the U.S. House of Representatives from New York's 37th district
- In office March 4, 1919 – February 28, 1922
- Preceded by: Harry H. Pratt
- Succeeded by: Lewis Henry

Personal details
- Born: Alanson Bigelow Houghton; October 10, 1863 Cambridge, Massachusetts, US
- Died: September 15, 1941 (aged 77) Dartmouth, Massachusetts, US
- Party: Republican
- Children: Amory Houghton
- Relatives: Houghton family

Alanson Bigelow Houghton (October 10, 1863 – September 15, 1941) was an American businessman, politician, and diplomat who served as a congressman and ambassador. He was a member of the Republican Party.

== Early life and business career ==
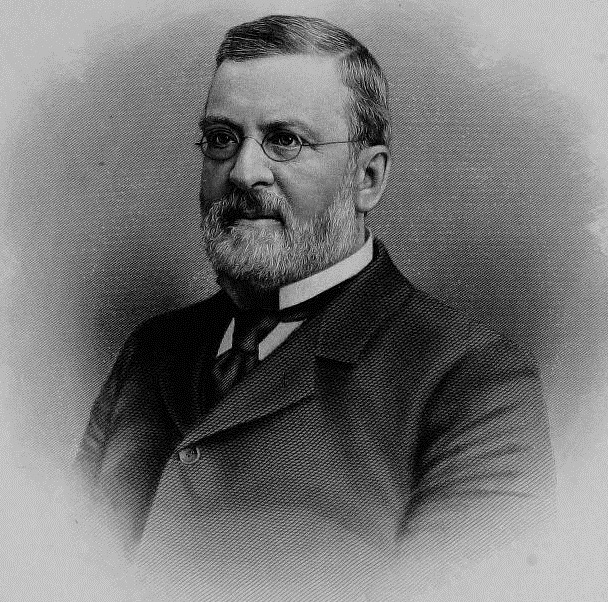
Amory Houghton Jr. (1837–1909), his father

Alanson B. Houghton was born on October 10, 1863, in Cambridge, Middlesex County, Massachusetts. He was the son of Ellen Ann (Bigelow) and Amory Houghton Jr. (1837–1909), who would later be President of the Corning Glass Works, the company founded by Alanson's grandfather Amory Houghton Sr. in 1851.

In 1868, his family moved to Corning, New York. He attended the Corning Free Academy in Corning and St. Paul's School in Concord, New Hampshire. Houghton graduated from Harvard University in 1886 and then pursued postgraduate courses in Europe. He attended graduate school in Göttingen, Berlin, and Paris until 1889.

Upon his return to Corning in 1889, Houghton began work for his family's business, Corning Glass Works. He served as vice president of the company from 1902 to 1910, and as the company's president from 1910 to 1918. Under Houghton's leadership, the company tripled in size to become one of the largest producers of glass products in the United States. The company manufactured 40% of incandescent light bulbs and 75% of the railway signal glass used in the U.S.

Houghton's interest in and promotion of education, particularly in western New York state, led to his being appointed a trustee of Hobart College in 1917.

He was a member of the Jekyll Island Club (aka The Millionaires Club) on Jekyll Island, Georgia, along with J.P. Morgan and William Rockefeller among others.

== Politics ==
Houghton was a presidential elector in the 1904 presidential election. He was also a presidential elector in 1916, voting for the Republican candidates Charles Evans Hughes and Charles W. Fairbanks.

In 1918, Alanson B. Houghton defeated incumbent Congressman Harry H. Pratt in the Republican primary. He went on to win the general election and joined the Sixty-sixth Congress, representing New York's 37th Congressional District. In 1920, Houghton garnered 68% of the vote to win reelection over Democrat Charles R. Durham and Socialist Francis Toomey. Houghton took office on March 4, 1919. During his two terms in the House, Houghton served on the Foreign Affairs and Ways and Means committees.

== Diplomacy ==
Houghton, having studied in prewar Germany, admired German culture and understood German politics. His appointment was approved by the U.S. Senate and well received by the Weimar Republic. On February 28, 1922, Houghton resigned his House seat to accept appointment from President Warren G. Harding as the U.S. Ambassador to Germany. Houghton believed that world peace, European stability, and American prosperity depended upon a reconstruction of Europe's economy and political system. He saw his role as promoting American political engagement with Europe. He overcame domestic opposition, and disinterest in Washington. He quickly realized that the central issues of the day were all entangled in economics, especially war debts owed by the Allies to the United States, reparations owed by Germany to the Allies, worldwide inflation, and international trade and investment. Solutions, he believed, required new policies by Washington and close cooperation with Britain and Germany. He was a leading promoter of the Dawes Plan.

On February 24, 1925, President Calvin Coolidge appointed Houghton as the U.S. Ambassador to Great Britain. Houghton assumed the post on April 6, 1925, and served until April 27, 1929. Houghton's service in both Germany and England gave him a unique ability to address the issue of the war reparations Germany owed to its World War I opponents, England being one of them. Houghton laid some of the groundwork for the Dawes Plan, named after then U.S. Vice President Charles G. Dawes, who would be Houghton's successor as Ambassador to Great Britain.

In 1928, Houghton ran for the U.S. Senate from New York against first-term incumbent Royal S. Copeland, a Democrat. Houghton lost by just over one percentage point.

== Death and legacy ==
After his loss in the 1928 Senate race, Houghton returned to managing the Corning Glass Works. He was a founding member of the Board of Trustees of the Institute for Advanced Study, in Princeton, New Jersey, serving as chairman until his death in 1941. He also was an original standing committee member of the Foundation for the Study of Cycles and served as vice president of the American Peace Society, which publishes World Affairs, the oldest U.S. journal on international relations.

Houghton died at his summer home in South Dartmouth, Massachusetts, on September 15, 1941. He was interred at Hope Cemetery Annex in Corning, New York.

During World War II the Liberty ship SS Alanson B. Houghton was built in Panama City, Florida, and named in his honor.

Houghton's son, Amory Houghton (1899–1981), served as the United States Ambassador to France (1957–1961) under President Dwight D. Eisenhower. His grandson, Amo Houghton, was a U.S. Congressman from New York from 1987 until 2005.

== See also ==
- List of covers of Time magazine (1920s) – April 5, 1926
- The Harvard Monthly

U.S. House of Representatives
Preceded by Harry H. Pratt	Member of the U.S. House of Representatives from New York's 37th congressional district 1919–1922	Succeeded by Lewis Henry
Diplomatic posts
Preceded by Ellis Loring Dresel	United States Ambassador to Germany; 1922–1925	Succeeded by Jacob Gould Schurman
Preceded by Frank B. Kellogg	United States Ambassador to the United Kingdom; 1925–1929	Succeeded by Charles G. Dawes
Party political offices
Preceded by William M. Calder	Republican nominee for U.S. senator from New York (Class 1); 1928	Succeeded by E. Harold Cluett
