= William D. Thomas =

American politician

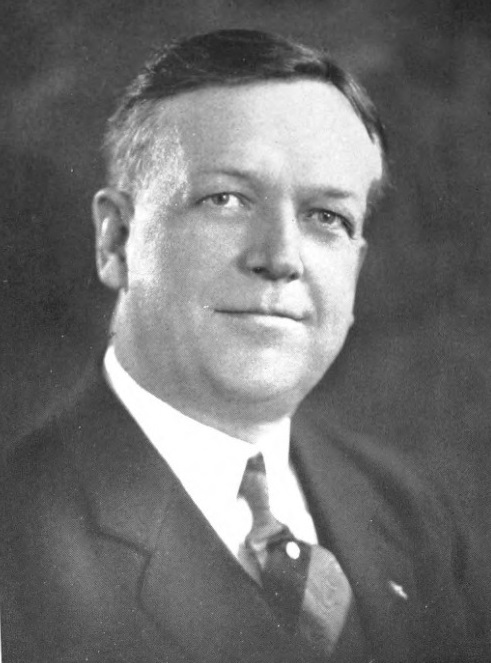
- From 1938's William David Thomas, Late a Representative

Member of the United States House of Representatives from New York's 29th district
- In office January 30, 1934 – May 17, 1936
- Preceded by: James S. Parker
- Succeeded by: E. Harold Cluett

Treasurer of Rensselaer County, New York
- In office 1927–1933
- Preceded by: Mary M. Lewis
- Succeeded by: John J. Tower

Member of the New York State Assembly from the Rensselaer County 2nd District
- In office January 1, 1925 – December 31, 1926
- Preceded by: Henry Meurs
- Succeeded by: Maurice Whitney

Personal details
- Born: March 22, 1880 Middle Granville, New York, U.S.
- Died: May 17, 1936 (aged 56) Washington, D.C., U.S.
- Resting place: Maple Grove New Cemetery, Hoosick Falls, New York
- Party: Republican
- Spouse: Carolyn G. Haffner (m. 1907-1936, his death)
- Children: 1
- Education: Albany College of Pharmacy
- Profession: Pharmacist

William David Thomas (March 22, 1880 – May 17, 1936) was an American pharmacist and politician from Hoosick Falls, New York. A Republican, he was most notable for his service as a member of the United States House of Representatives from New York, a position he held from 1934 until his death.

A native of Middle Granville, New York, Thomas graduated from Albany College of Pharmacy in 1904 and settled in Hoosick Falls, where he operated a pharmacy. Thomas also became involved in banking and other business ventures.

A Republican, Thomas served as town clerk of Hoosick from 1917 to 1925. In 1925 and 1926, he served in the New York State Assembly. From 1927 to 1933 he served as treasurer of Rensselaer County. He was chairman of the county's Republican Party from 1927 to 1934.

In January 1934, Thomas won a special election for a seat in the United States House of Representatives. He won election to a full term in November 1934 and served from January 30, 1934, until his death. He died in Washington, D.C., on May 17, 1936, before the expiration of his Congressional term. Thomas was buried at Maple Grove New Cemetery in Hoosick Falls.

== Early life ==
William D. Thomas was born in Middle Granville, New York, on March 22, 1880, the eldest son of David T. Thomas and Mary Rebecca (McKenzie) Thomas. He attended the schools of Middle Granville, and graduated from Middle Granville High School in 1897. In 1904, he graduated from the Albany College of Pharmacy with a Graduate of Pharmacy (Ph. G.) degree.

== Career ==
Thomas settled in Hoosick Falls, New York, in 1905, where he was a partner in a pharmacy, Smith & Thomas. In 1906, he purchased his partner's share, after which he owned and operated the business as Thomas Pharmacy. Thomas was active in banking and finance, including serving on the board of directors of the Permanent Savings and Loan Association of Hoosick Falls and the Peoples First National Bank.

A Republican, Thomas served as town clerk of Hoosick from 1917 to 1925. He was a member of the New York State Assembly (Rensselaer Co., 2nd D.) in 1925 and 1926. From 1927 to 1933, Taylor served as treasurer of Rensselaer County. From 1927 to 1934, he was chairman of the Rensselaer County Republican Committee. Thomas was also active in civic and fraternal organizations, including the Masons and Elks, and he served both organizations in leadership roles. In addition, he was an honorary member of United Spanish War Veterans.

In 1934, Thomas was elected to the United States House of Representatives, filling the vacancy caused by the death of James S. Parker. He served from January 30, 1934, until his death in Washington, D.C., on May 17, 1936. He was buried at Maple Grove Cemetery in Hoosick Falls.

== Family ==
In 1907, Thomas married Carolyn G. Haffner of Brooklyn. They were the parents of a daughter, Lillian H. Thomas. Lillian Thomas was the wife of Aubrey Brownell of Hamburg, New York.

Carolyn Haffner Thomas was a graduate of Girls' Normal School in Brooklyn and taught school before her marriage. She played an important role in the career of painter Grandma Moses. In the mid-1930s, Carolyn Thomas asked Moses to take part in a display for the Hoosick Falls Women's Exchange. Several of Moses' paintings were exhibited at the Thomas Pharmacy as part of this project, and they were noticed by art collector Louis J. Caldor. Caldor purchased them and began to publicize and exhibit Moses' work, which led to her achieving international fame.

== See also ==
- List of members of the United States Congress who died in office (1900–1949)

New York State Assembly
Preceded by Henry Meurs	New York State Assembly; Rensselaer County, 2nd District; 1925–1926	Succeeded by Maurice Whitney
U.S. House of Representatives
Preceded by James S. Parker	Member of the U.S. House of Representatives from New York's 29th congressional district 1934–1936	Succeeded by E. Harold Cluett
