= 1934 United States Senate election in New York =

- November 6, 1934
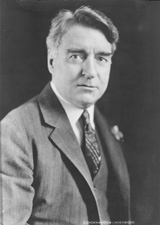

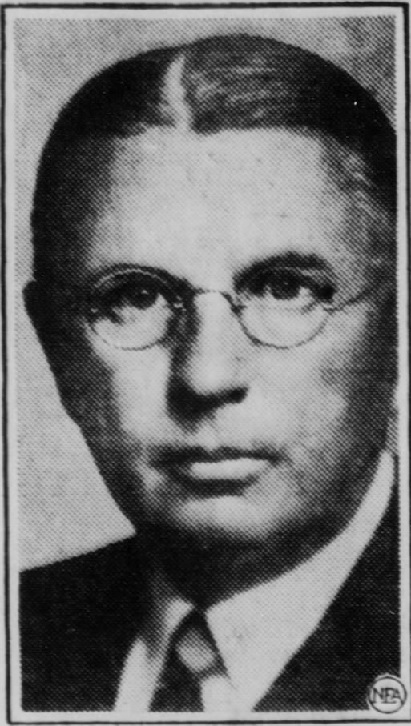

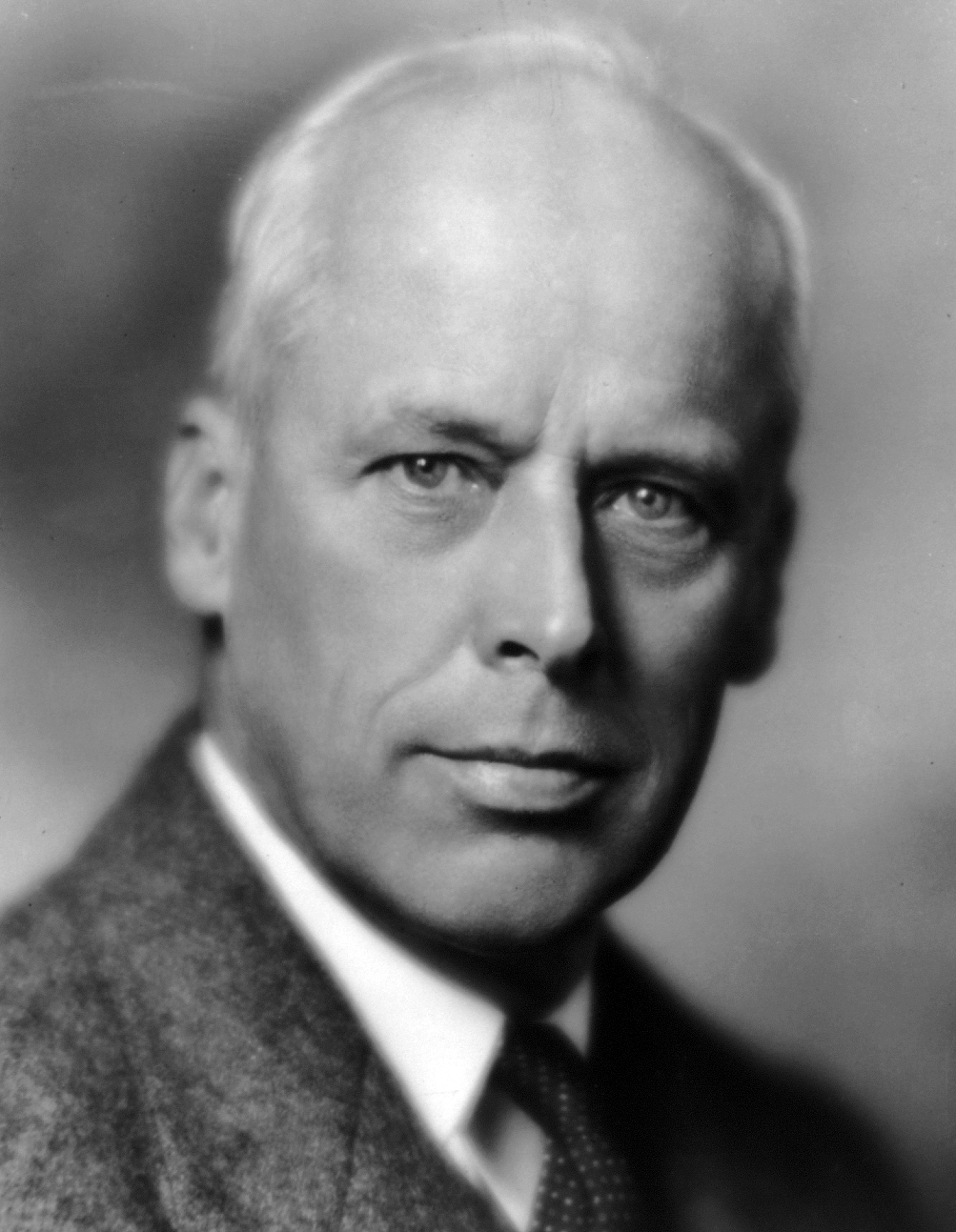
Nominee	Royal S. Copeland	E. Harold Cluett	Norman Thomas
Party	Democratic	Republican	Socialist
Popular vote	2,046,377	1,363,440	194,952
Percentage	55.34%	36.87%	5.27%
- County results Copeland: 40–50% 50–60% 60–70% 70–80% Cluett: 40–50% 50–60% 60–70%
U.S. senator before election
Royal S. Copeland
Democratic
Elected U.S. Senator
Royal S. Copeland
Democratic

The 1934 United States Senate election in New York was held on November 6, 1934, to elect a U.S. Senator. Incumbent Democratic Senator Royal Copeland was re-elected to a third term in office, though he would die in office in 1938.

== Democratic nomination ==
=== Candidates ===
- Royal S. Copeland, incumbent U.S. Senator since 1923

=== Convention ===
The Democratic State Convention was held September 27 in Buffalo. With Copeland and the rest of the Democratic ticket unopposed, the convention was uneventful. Copeland's nomination was submitted by Abraham Kaplan of Tammany Hall.

== Republican nomination ==
=== Candidates ===
- E. Harold Cluett, businessman

==== Withdrew ====
- William M. Chadbourne

==== Declined ====
- Joseph R. Hanley, State Senator

=== Convention ===
In marked contrast to the Democratic convention, the Republican convention in Rochester on September 28 was considered the most raucous for that party since 1910, when Theodore Roosevelt led a progressive revolt. The early focus of the convention was on the race for Governor, where Robert Moses won a hard-fought three-ballot struggle. After this, several other nominations were completed without opposition. After a recess of ten minutes, the Senate contest began; it quickly devolved to a contest by the delegates to find a man willing to join Moses's ticket.

First, Harold Riegelman nominated William M. Chadbourne for Senate; his nomination was seconded by William T. Simpson and Hamilton Fish III. Then, William D. Thomas nominated E. Harold Cluett; his nomination was seconded by Philip Elling of Ulster County and Frank L. Wiswall of Albany. Chadbourne ultimately declined to run, announcing his preference that another man should be nominated; Cluett was then nominated by acclamation, though some delegates attempted to humorously vote for candidates who were not in nomination. Cluett made a brief acceptance speech, pledging to give all his time and effort to the campaign.

== General election ==
=== Candidates ===
- Max Bedacht, revolutionary activist and journalist (Communist)
- Henry Skillman Breckinridge, attorney for Charles Lindbergh and former Assistant Secretary of War (Constitutional)
- William S. Chase (Law Preservation)
- E. Harold Cluett, businessman (Republican)
- Royal S. Copeland, incumbent Senator since 1923 (Democratic)
- Olive Johnson, newspaper editor and activist (Socialist Labor)
- Norman Thomas, Presbyterian minister and pacifist (Socialist)

=== Results ===
1934 United States Senate election in New York
Party	Candidate	Votes	%	±%
Democratic	Royal S. Copeland (incumbent)	2,046,377	55.21%	▲6.13
Republican	E. Harold Cluett	1,363,440	36.87%	▼11.02
Socialist	Norman Thomas	194,952	5.27%	▲2.65
Communist	Max Bedacht	45,396	1.23%	▲0.95
Constitutional	Henry Skillman Breckinridge	24,241	0.66%	N/A
Prohibition	Michael Bartell	16,769	0.45%	▲0.45
Socialist Labor	Olive Johnson	6,622	0.18%	▲0.05
Total votes		3,727,797	100.00%	

== See also ==
- 1934 United States Senate elections
- New York state elections
