= 1922 United States Senate election in New York =

- November 7, 1922
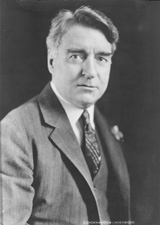

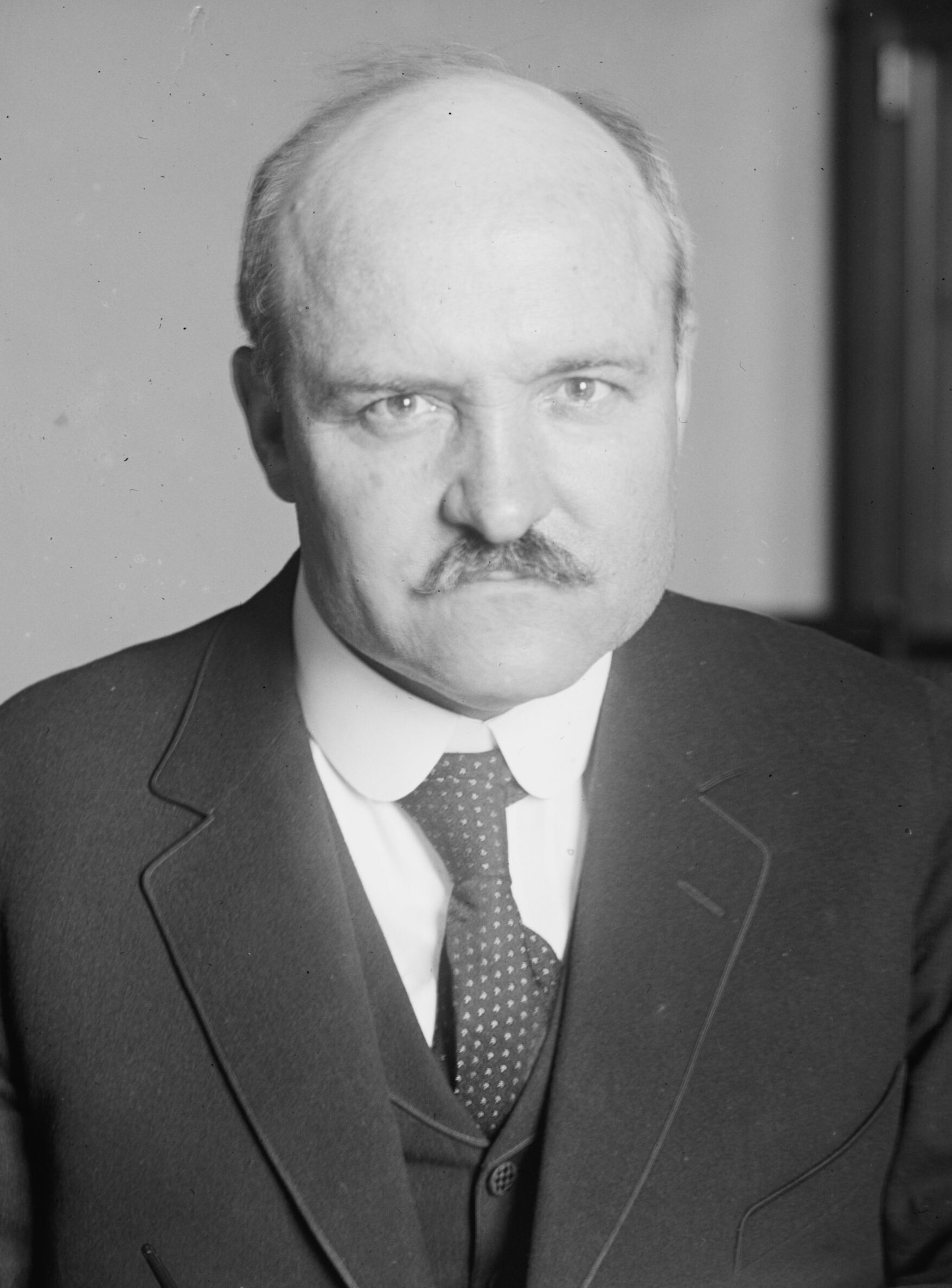
Nominee	Royal S. Copeland	William M. Calder
Party	Democratic	Republican
Popular vote	1,276,667	995,421
Percentage	52.60%	41.01%
- County results Copeland: 40–50% 50–60% 60–70% 70–80% Calder: 40–50% 50–60% 60–70%
Senator before election
William M. Calder
Republican
Elected Senator
Royal S. Copeland
Democratic

The 1922 United States Senate election in New York was held on November 7, 1922. Incumbent Republican Senator William Calder ran for re-election to a second term, but was defeated by Democrat Royal Copeland.

== Republican nomination ==
Despite early opposition from the Anti-Saloon League and other discontents within the state party, some of whom attempted to draft Theodore Roosevelt Jr. or William Hayward as an alternative candidate, no candidate materialized and Calder was seen as assured of renomination by August.

Calder was renominated at the Republican convention on September 29 along with the entire Republican ticket. His renomination was carried unopposed.

== Democratic nomination ==
It was suggested during the campaign that Tammany Hall boss Charles F. Murphy might block Al Smith's third consecutive nomination for Governor, leaving him to accept the nomination for Senate as a compromise. However, Smith carried the gubernatorial nomination unanimously, and the Senate nomination was given unanimously to Dr. Royal S. Copeland, the President of the New York City Board of Health who had gained attention for his handling of the Spanish flu pandemic.

== General election ==
=== Candidates ===
- William M. Calder, incumbent Senator (Republican)
- Royal S. Copeland, President of the New York City Board of Health and former Mayor of Ann Arbor, Michigan (Democratic)
- Coleridge A. Hart, candidate for Judge of the Court of Appeals in 1908 and 1914 (Prohibition)
- Algernon Lee, member of the New York City Board of Aldermen (Socialist and Farmer-Labor)
- Henry Kuhn, perennial candidate (Socialist Labor)

=== Results ===
1922 United States Senate election in New York
Party	Candidate	Votes	%	±%
Democratic	Royal S. Copeland	1,276,667	52.60%	▲13.38
Republican	William M. Calder (incumbent)	995,421	41.01%	▼13.31
Socialist	Algernon Lee	117,928	4.86%	▲0.90
Prohibition	Coleridge A. Hart	32,124	1.32%	▲0.07
Socialist Labor	Henry Kuhn	4,993	0.21%	▼0.05
Total votes		2,427,133	100.00%	
