= Royal S. Copeland =

American academic, homeopathic physician, and politician

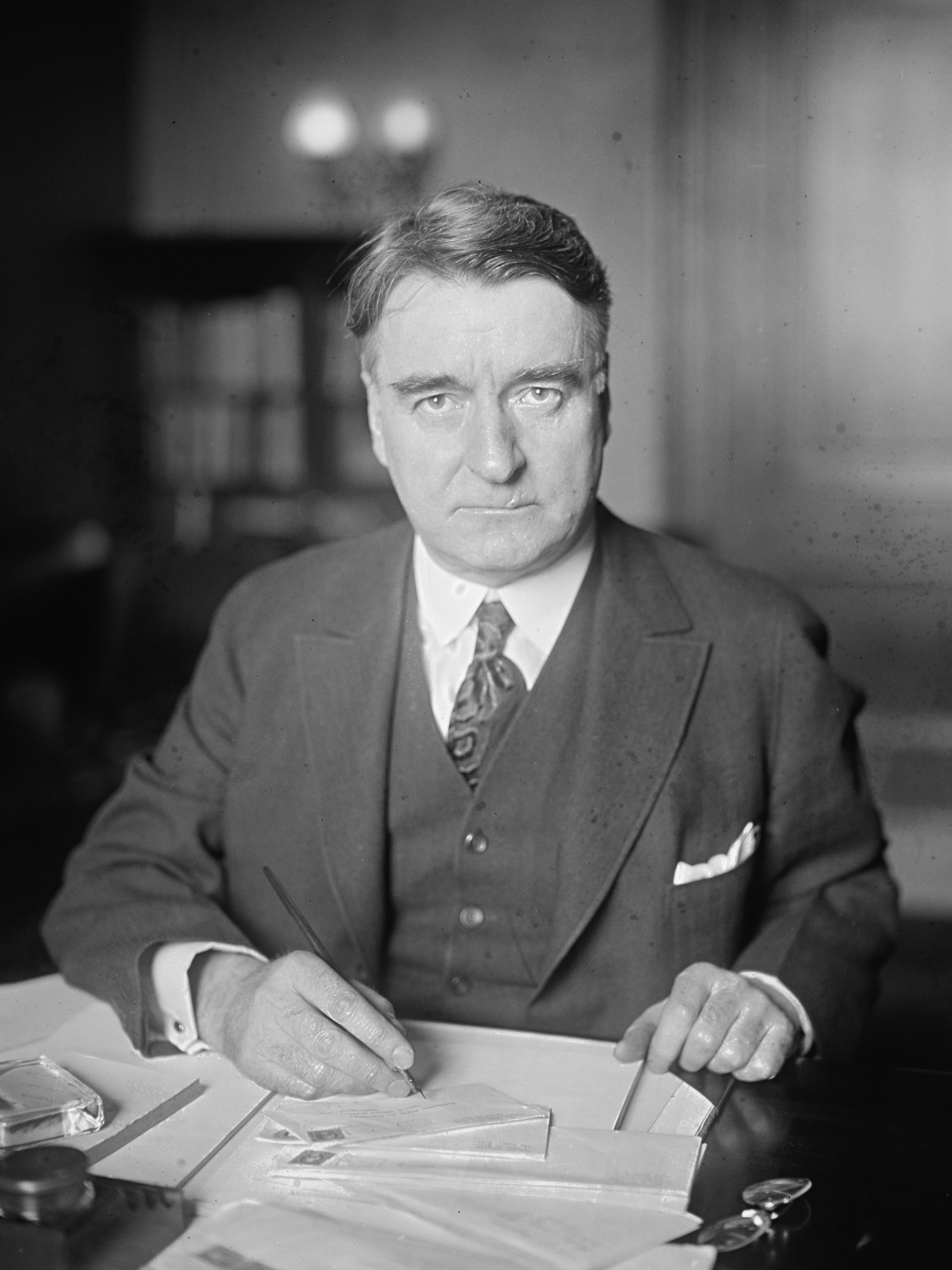
- Copeland in 1923

United States Senator from New York
- In office March 4, 1923 – June 17, 1938
- Preceded by: William M. Calder
- Succeeded by: James M. Mead

Commissioner of the New York City Department of Health
- In office April 29, 1918 – March 4, 1923
- Appointed by: John F. Hylan
- Preceded by: J. Lewis Amster
- Succeeded by: Frank J. Monaghan

Mayor of Ann Arbor, Michigan
- In office 1901–1903
- Preceded by: Gottlob Luick
- Succeeded by: Arthur Brown

Personal details
- Born: Royal Samuel Copeland; November 7, 1868 Dexter, Michigan, U.S.
- Died: June 17, 1938 (aged 69) Washington, D.C., U.S.
- Resting place: Mahwah Cemetery, Mahwah, New Jersey
- Party: Republican (before 1922); Democratic (1922–1938)
- Education: Eastern Michigan University; University of Michigan

Royal Samuel Copeland (November 7, 1868 – June 17, 1938) was an American academic, homeopathic physician, and politician. He held elected offices in both Michigan (as a Republican) and New York (as a Democrat), and served as a United States senator from New York from 1923 to 1938.

== Early life and medical career ==
Born in Dexter, Michigan, to parents Roscoe P. Copeland and Frances J. Holmes, Royal Copeland graduated from Dexter High School in 1885 and attended Michigan State Normal College (now Eastern Michigan University). In 1888, he taught school in Sylvan Township, Michigan.

He graduated in 1889 from the University of Michigan in Ann Arbor with a degree in medicine. After graduate studies in Europe, Copeland practiced medicine in Bay City, Michigan, from 1890 to 1895. Copeland was admitted to the Homeopathy Society of Michigan on May 21, 1890, and was made secretary of the society in October 1893. He was a professor of Ophthalmology and Otology in the University of Michigan Medical School's Homeopathic Department from 1895 until 1908.

== Political career in Michigan ==
During his time as a medical professor in Ann Arbor, Copeland was active in municipal politics. A Republican, he served as mayor of Ann Arbor from 1901 to 1903. He was president of the Ann Arbor Board of Education from 1907 to 1908. He also served for several years as president of the Ann Arbor Board of Park Commissioners.

== Spanish flu in New York ==
On July 15, 1908, Copeland married Frances Spalding. The same year, Copeland moved to New York City to take a position as dean at the New York Homeopathic Medical College and Flower Hospital. Copeland left his position as dean in 1918 in order to serve as President of the New York City Board of Health. He was appointed to this position by Mayor John Hylan in May 1918.

In September 28, Copeland acknowledged that the Spanish flu outbreak was seriously impacting the city, and possibly an epidemic. However, he decided to permit motion picture theaters to remain open. He considered closing the theaters to have little effect in reducing the epidemic as long as the crowded transportation lines continued to operate. Copeland also left the city's schools open, arguing it was better, "to have the children under the constant observation of qualified persons than to close the schools". New York City, Chicago and New Haven, Connecticut were the notable exceptions of most cities closing their own schools during the epidemic.

In December 1918, he amended the city health code to require that landlords maintain heat in apartments they rented. This had been a major issue in light of coal shortage earlier that year, numerous eviction cases around failure to provide heat, and the widespread 1918–1920 New York City rent strikes.

During the epidemic, Copeland organized a system of emergency health districts to provide localized care. If individuals who lived in apartments or private residences contracted the virus, they were quarantined and care was provided to them in their house. However, if individuals who lived in tenements or boarding houses contracted the virus, they were moved to city hospitals. Hospitals soon became overcrowded and Copeland then worked with New York's most famous public health nurse, Lillian Wald, to extend home care to the tenement neighborhoods as well.

Copeland served a total of five terms of the New York City Board of Health, before taking office as a United States senator in 1923.

== United States Senate ==
In 1922, Copeland ran as a Democrat for the U.S. Senate, defeating first-term Republican Senator William M. Calder. Franklin D. Roosevelt served as his honorary campaign manager for this election. Copeland was re-elected in 1928 over Republican challenger Alanson B. Houghton, the U.S. ambassador to Britain and a former U.S. Representative. Copeland was again re-elected in 1934, this time defeating future U.S. Congressman E. Harold Cluett.

During his three terms in the Senate, Copeland served as chairman of the U.S. Senate Committee on Rules and Administration from 1933 to 1936 and chairman of the Committee on Commerce from 1935 to 1938. In 1935-1936 Copeland served as chairman of the highly controversial Copeland Committee, which gave a scathing review of air traffic safety and the operation of the Bureau of Air Commerce. Copeland served as primary author and sponsor of the Federal Food, Drug, and Cosmetic Act of 1938 which entrenched special protections for homeopaths. He was the primary sponsor of the Copeland "Anti-kickback" Act, which targeted kickbacks to federal contractors, subcontractors and officials from construction employees.

Copeland was close to the regular Democratic organization in New York, the boss-led Tammany Hall. He was a conservative Democrat and not especially supportive of the New Deal policies of his fellow New Yorker, Franklin Roosevelt. He was also a friend of Harry S. Truman when they both served in the U.S. Senate. Copeland was known for his successful efforts to bring air conditioning to the Senate.

In July 1937, Copeland proposed two rider amendments to the Interstate Commerce Act which would add an anti-lynching bill to the legislation. Both failed to pass due to the majority of Senate Democrats voting to table them.

In 1937 he lost the Democratic nomination for Mayor of New York City to Judge Jeremiah T. Mahoney, and the Republican nomination to incumbent Republican Mayor Fiorello LaGuardia.

== Death ==
Copeland died at his apartment in Washington, DC on June 17, 1938. According to news reports, he died of a circulatory collapse brought on by overwork during the longer than usual Senate session that ended on the day of his death. His funeral was at his home in Suffern, New York. He was buried at Mahwah Cemetery in Mahwah, New Jersey.

== Election results ==
Year	Office	Subject	Party	Votes	Portion	Opponent	Party	Votes	Portion
1922	U.S. Senator (Class 1) from New York	Royal S. Copeland	Democratic	1,276,667	49.5%	William M. Calder	Republican	995,421	38.6%
1928	U.S. Senator (Class 1) from New York	Royal S. Copeland	Democratic	2,084,273	46.7%	Alanson B. Houghton	Republican	2,034,014	45.6%
1934	U.S. Senator (Class 1) from New York	Royal S. Copeland	Democratic	2,046,377	52.0%	E. Harold Cluett	Republican	1,363,440	34.7%
1937	Democratic nomination for Mayor of New York City	Royal S. Copeland	Democratic	c. 200,000	2/5	Jeremiah T. Mahoney	Democratic	c. 400,000	3/5
1937	Republican nomination for Mayor of New York City	Royal S. Copeland			1/3	Fiorello H. LaGuardia	Republican		2/3

== Honors and society memberships ==
Copeland was a member of several honor societies and fraternal organizations, including the Pi Gamma Mu international honor society in social sciences, which he served in various positions, Delta Kappa Epsilon, the New York Athletic Club, the National Democratic Club, the Elks, the Freemasons, the Ann Arbor Commandery No. 13, Knights Templar and Moslem Shrine Temple of the Ancient Arabic Order of the Nobles of the Mystic Shrine, both in Ann Arbor, the Shriners, the Friendly Sons of St. Patrick, the Sons of the American Revolution and the Eugenics Committee of the United States of America.Israel W. Charny; Rouben Paul Adalian; Steven L. Jacobs; Eric Markusen; Marc I. Sherman (1999). The Encyclopedia of Genocide. Oxford: ABC-CLIO. p. 220. ISBN 9780874369281.

At various times Copeland served as president, vice president, and secretary of the Michigan Homeopathic Society; president, the American Ophthalmological, Otological, and Laryngological Society; president, American Institute of Homeopathy; vice president, the American Public Health Association; member, the National Board of Control of Epworth League; president, the Michigan Epworth League; member, the Tuberculosis Commission of Michigan; trustee, Michigan State Tuberculosis Sanitarium; and three-time elected member, the General Conference of the Methodist Episcopal Church.

== Publications ==
- Copeland (September 1904). "In defence of the attenuated drug". Medical Century. 12 (9): 257–264.
- Copeland, R. S. (1906). Refraction, including muscle imbalance and the adjustment of glasses. Philadelphia: Boericke & Tafel.
- Copeland, Royal S. (May 1909). The scientific reasonableness of homoeopathy. New York. hdl:2027/mdp.39015071593936.
- Royal S Copeland; Warren Robinson Austin; Daniel Oren Hastings; Hearst Unofficial Senatorial Commission (1936). The crisis in Palestine reports of Hearst Unofficial Senatorial Commission. New York: Hearst. OCLC 569942876.
- Royal S. Copeland (1935). Doctor Copeland's home medical book. Philadelphia: John C. Winston. OCLC 4758731.

== See also ==
- List of members of the United States Congress who died in office (1900–1949)

Party political offices
Preceded by William F. McCombs	Democratic nominee for U.S. Senator from New York (Class 1); 1922, 1928, 1934	Succeeded by James M. Mead
Political offices
Preceded by Gottlob Luick	Mayor of Ann Arbor, Michigan; 1901–1903	Succeeded by Arthur Brown
U.S. Senate
Preceded by William M. Calder	U.S. senator (Class 1) from New York; 1923–1938; Served alongside: James W. Wadsworth, Jr., Robert F. Wagner	Succeeded by James M. Mead
