= William H. Hughes =

American politician

William Henry Hughes
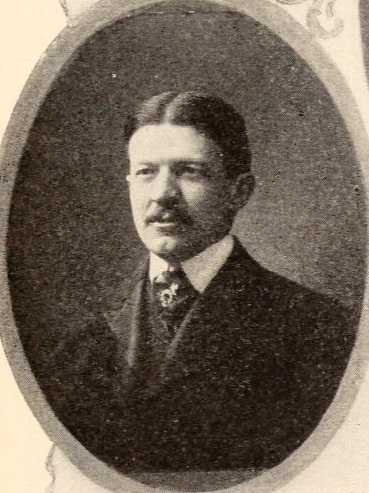
- Hughes in 1902

William Henry Hughes (September 30, 1864 – November 11, 1903) was an American businessman and politician from New York.

== Life ==
He was born on September 30, 1864, in Chapmanville, Venango County, Pennsylvania. He owned stone quarries in New York and Vermont, and was a wholesale dealer in slate.

Hughes was Quartermaster General of the State Militia from 1897 to 1898.

He was a member of the New York State Assembly (Washington Co.) in 1902 and 1903; and was Chairman of the Committee on Military Affairs in 1903.

On September 17, 1903, he filed schedules in bankruptcy. On November 3, 1903, he was re-elected to the State Assembly. He hanged himself on November 11, 1903, at his home in Granville, New York; and was buried at the Elmwood Cemetery in Middle Granville.

== Sources ==
New York State Assembly
| Preceded by Samuel B. Irwin | New York State Assembly; Washington County; 1902–1903 | Succeeded by James S. Parker |
