= Samuel Levy (politician) =

American lawyer

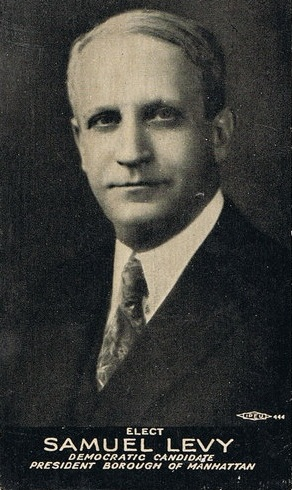

Samuel Levy (March 17, 1876 – March 15, 1953) was an American lawyer, businessman, and public official, who served as Manhattan borough president.

== Life and career ==
Levy was born in New York City on March 17, 1876, to a Jewish family.

He graduated from the University of the City of New York (now New York University) in 1894 and received a law degree from New York Law School in 1896. In addition to maintaining a law practice, Levy was a successful businessman, with his primary interests being real estate investment and development.

A Democrat, he served on the New York Board of Education from 1929 to 1931.

In 1931, Levy was appointed to complete an unexpired term as Manhattan borough president. He won election to a full four-year term in 1933. Levy considered a run for mayor in 1937. He instead backed Senator Royal S. Copeland for mayor, and sought the nomination for New York City Council President in the Democratic and Republican primaries. He was defeated by Newbold Morris in the Republican primary and also lost his bid for the Democratic nomination.

After leaving office, Levy returned to his legal and business interests.

He was also involved in several educational and civic causes, including serving as chairman of the Yeshiva University Board of Trustees.

Levy died in New York City on March 15, 1953, two days before his seventy-seventh birthday. He was married to Sadie (Vesell). His son, Lawrence, married Beta Rothafel, the daughter of theatrical impresario and entrepreneur Samuel Roxy Rothafel. Through his granddaughter, Penny (Levy), Samuel was the great-grandfather of actress Amanda Peet.

Political offices
Preceded by Julius Miller	Borough President of Manhattan; 1931–1937	Succeeded by Stanley M. Isaacs
