= Jeremiah T. Mahoney =

American lawyer and judge (1878–1970)

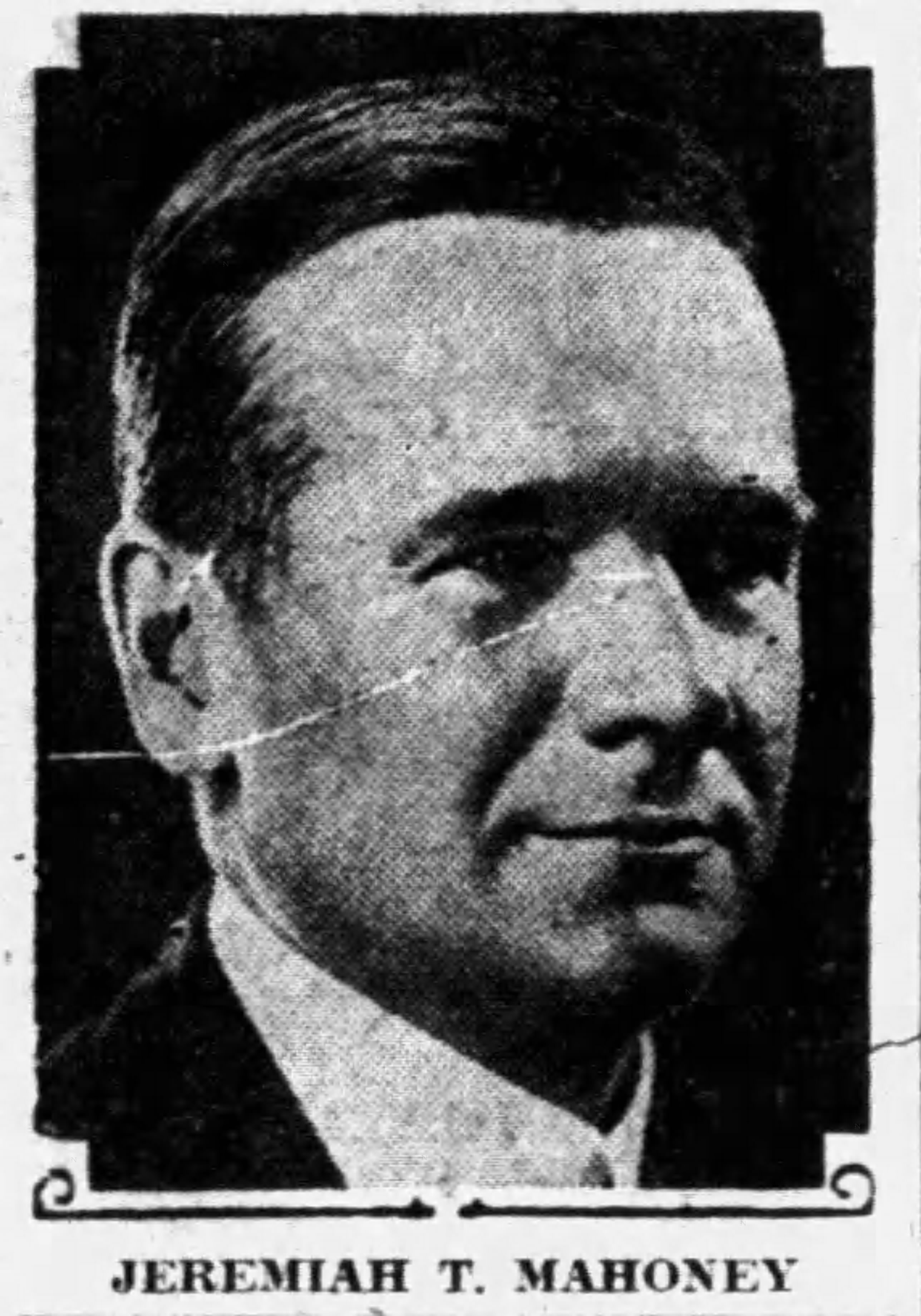
- Mahoney c. 1929

Justice of the New York Supreme Court
- In office January 1923 – November 1928
- Preceded by: Samuel Greenbaum
- Succeeded by: William T. Collins

Personal details
- Born: June 23, 1878 New York City
- Died: June 15, 1970 (aged 91) New York City
- Party: Democratic Party
- Education: City College of New York (A.B.); New York University (LL.B., LL.M.); St. Francis Xavier College (A.M.)

Jeremiah T. Mahoney (June 23, 1878 – June 15, 1970) was an American lawyer and jurist. He served on the New York Supreme Court and as president of the Amateur Athletic Union (AAU). As president of the AAU, he advocated for the United States to boycott the 1936 Summer Olympics in protest of the antisemitic and racist policies of Nazi Germany. He was the Democratic Party nominee for mayor of New York City in the 1937 election, but lost to Fiorello La Guardia.

== Early life ==
Mahoney was born and raised on the East Side of Manhattan. His father, an Irish immigrant, worked as a police officer. Mahoney attended local public schools and graduated from the City College of New York. In college, he competed in baseball, gridiron football, track and field, and lacrosse. He graduated from City College in 1895 with a Bachelor of Arts. He earned a Bachelor of Laws and Master of Laws from New York University and a Master of Arts from St. Francis Xavier College.

Mahoney was a high jumper, and qualified for the 1906 Summer Olympics, but did not compete as he was attending law school. He qualified for the 1908 Summer Olympics as well, but did not attend because of his job in the city comptroller's office.

== Career ==
Mahoney entered into a partnership in a law firm with Robert F. Wagner and N. Taylor Phillips in 1910. In September 1912, William Jay Gaynor, the mayor of New York City, appointed Mahoney and Harry M. Rice as Commissioners of Accounts, succeeding Raymond B. Fosdick. He also served as an officer for the New York Athletic Club. In 1920, he represented Babe Ruth in lawsuits seeking to stop the release of unauthorized films.

Mahoney became involved in Democratic Party politics through Tammany Hall. In January 1923, Governor Alfred E. Smith appointed Mahoney to the New York Supreme Court to fill the vacancy caused by the retirement of Samuel Greenbaum. He was elected to a 14-year term that November on the Tammany Hall slate. Mahoney resigned in November 1928 to return to his law practice, and was succeeded on the court by William T. Collins. In the year before he left the court, 1927, Mahoney joined the Board of the newly formed Union Labor Life Insurance Company, one of the legacy projects of labor advocate Samuel Gompers.

In December 1934, Mahoney was elected president of the Amateur Athletic Union (AAU), succeeding Avery Brundage, who had not run for reelection. Mahoney led the effort to push the United States to boycott the 1936 Summer Olympics, held in Berlin, because of the discrimination of Nazi Germany against non-Aryan athletes. Brundage opposed the boycott. Ultimately, the AAU voted against boycotting the Olympics, and Mahoney resigned as president of the AAU. He was again elected president in December 1936, defeating Patrick J. Walsh, the candidate endorsed by Brundage. He did not run for reelection in 1938, and was succeeded by Samuel E. Hoyt.

Mahoney ran for the Democratic Party nomination for mayor of New York City in the 1937 election. Mahoney supported the New Deal, but Tammany Hall was opposed to it, and so they supported U.S. Senator Royal S. Copeland, an anti-New Deal Democrat. Mahoney won the nomination. Copeland also ran for the Republican Party nomination against Fiorello La Guardia, the incumbent mayor and a supporter of the New Deal, and lost. Mahoney lost to La Guardia in the general election, 60% to 40%.

One month after losing the mayoral election, Mahoney ran for a position on the executive committee of the American Olympic Committee. Mahoney spoke out against United States participation in the 1940 Summer Olympics, which were to be held in Tokyo, due to Japan's treatment of China in the Second Sino-Japanese War, but he said that he did not intend to rally opposition as he had for the 1936 Olympics. He served on the board of directors for the Ruppert Brewing Company, and represented the estate of Jacob Ruppert in 1940 in trying to sell the New York Yankees of Major League Baseball to a syndicate led by James Farley. He served as campaign manager for Wagner's 1944 reelection to the United States Senate. In 1945, La Guardia appointed Mahoney to a committee that was requested by Larry MacPhail and Branch Rickey to examine the status of African American baseball players. The committee determined that they were excluded from Organized Baseball due to "sheer prejudice and tradition".

In 1948, Mahoney criticized President Harry S. Truman's record, saying that Truman could not be reelected. He called for a draft movement to encourage Dwight D. Eisenhower to run as a Democrat in the 1948 United States presidential election instead. He retired as a Tammany Hall district leader after the 1948 election, though he continued to be involved in the AAU.

== Personal life ==
Mahoney married Mollie (née Cashen) in 1911. They had two sons, Jay and Candace. Mollie and Candace died in an airplane crash in the Adirondack Mountains in September 1939; Candace, who had been in training to become a pilot with the United States Army, was flying the plane.

Mahoney died at the New York Athletic Club, where he resided, on June 15, 1970. A service was held for him at the Church of St. Ignatius Loyola.

Mahoney Hall at the City College of New York, named for Mahoney, was dedicated in 1972. William Hurt portrayed Mahoney in the 2016 film Race, a biographical film about Jesse Owens at the 1936 Olympics.
