= E. Harold Cluett =

American politician

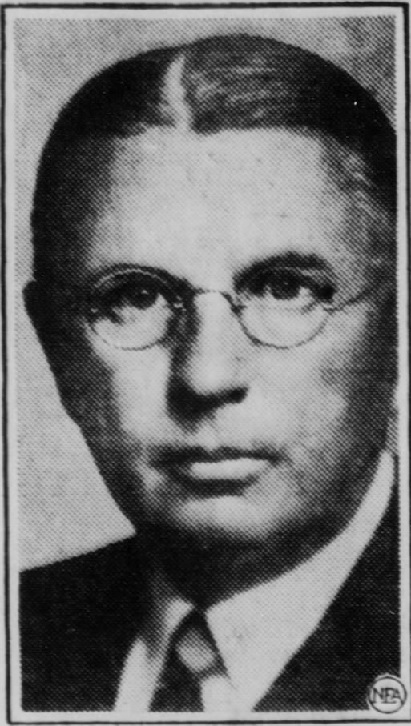

Member of the U.S. House of Representatives from New York's 29th district
- In office January 3, 1937 – January 3, 1943
- Preceded by: William D. Thomas
- Succeeded by: Dean P. Taylor

Personal details
- Born: July 13, 1874 Troy, New York
- Died: February 4, 1954 (aged 79) Troy, New York
- Resting place: Oakwood Cemetery, Troy, New York
- Party: Republican
- Spouse(s): Margaret Robertson Gorham (m. 1899–1943, her death); Catharine Haven ReQua (m. 1946–1954, his death)
- Children: 6
- Education: Williams College; Christ Church, Oxford
- Occupation: Business executive

Ernest Harold Cluett (July 13, 1874 – February 4, 1954) was an American businessman and politician from Troy, New York. A Republican, he was most notable for his service as a United States representative from 1937 to 1943.

Cluett was a native of Troy, and was educated at The Albany Academy, Williams College, and Christ Church, Oxford. He then joined his family's business, clothing manufacturers Cluett Peabody & Company. Cluett served successively as the company's treasurer, vice president, and chairman of the board. In addition to his business career, Cluett was active in government and civic causes, including promoting improvements to the Port of Albany–Rensselaer and Hudson River. He was a candidate for presidential elector in 1912, and was an elector in 1916. In 1934, he was an unsuccessful candidate for the United States Senate.

In 1936, Cluett was a successful candidate for the U.S. House. He was reelected twice and served from 1937 to 1943. During his congressional service, Cluett secured federal approval for the waterways improvements he had long supported, as well as new post office buildings for Troy and several nearby towns. In addition, he obtained passage of measures for flood control and soil erosion control in upstate New York.

After leaving Congress, Cluett lived in retirement in Troy and in Palm Beach, Florida. He died in Troy on February 4, 1954. Cluett was buried at Oakwood Cemetery in Troy.

== Early life ==
Ernest Harold Cluett was born in Troy, New York on July 13, 1874, a son of George Bywater Cluett and Amanda (Rockwell) Cluett. He attended the public schools and graduated from The Albany Academy in 1892. In 1896, he received his Bachelor of Arts degree from Williams College, where he was a member of Delta Psi (St. Anthony Hall). Cluett also studied in England at Christ Church, Oxford.

== Business and civic career ==
From 1900 to 1916, Cluett served as treasurer of Cluett Peabody & Company, his family's clothing manufacturing company. He became a company vice president in 1916, and served until 1929. From 1929 to 1937, Cluett served as Cluett, Peabody's chairman of the board of directors.

During World War I, Cluett was head of the employment division of the federal government's Watervliet Arsenal. He also traveled to France in 1918 on a special mission for the Y.M.C.A., and was a member of the Y.M.C.A.'s National War Work Council. In addition, he served as vice chairman of the Rensselaer County chapter of the American Red Cross.

From 1917 to 1918, Cluett was president of the Troy Chamber of Commerce. He was also a longtime director of the National City Bank of Troy. In addition, he was a trustee of Troy's Central Y.M.C.A, Samaritan Hospital, and Vanderheyden Hall. Cluett was active in the Navy League as a member of the advisory board for the league's Troy section.

== Political career ==
A Republican, in 1912, Cluett was a candidate for presidential elector; he was pledged to incumbent William Howard Taft, but New York was carried by the Democratic nominee, Woodrow Wilson. In 1916, he was again a candidate for elector; Cluett was pledged to Charles Evans Hughes, who carried New York in the general election, and he cast his ballot for the Republican ticket of Hughes and Charles W. Fairbanks. He was a longtime member of the Rensselaer County Republican Committee's steering committee, and served as chairman of Troy's planning commission.

In 1917, Cluett was a delegate to the annual convention of the Atlantic Deeper Waterways Association. In 1924, he was a delegate to the National Rivers and Harbors Congress that advocated for commercial improvements to America's waterways.

In 1934, Cluett was an unsuccessful candidate for election to the United States Senate. He was elected to the United States House of Representatives in 1936, and was reelected in 1938 and 1940. Cluett served in the 75th, 76th and 77th United States Congresses, January 3, 1937 to January 3, 1943. He was not a candidate for reelection in 1942. During his U.S. House service, Cluett was most prominent as a member of the Committee on Post Office and Post Roads.

As a congressman, Cluett was credited with passage of a federal flood control program for Rensselaer, Washington, and Warren Counties, as well as a soil erosion control program for Saratoga County. Cluett also secured passage of the law that preserved the sites of the American Revolution's Battles of Saratoga as the Saratoga National Historical Park. In addition, he obtained navigation and shipping improvements to the Port of Albany–Rensselaer and Hudson River, and new post office buildings in Troy and several other nearby communities. During World War II, he supported American involvement in the conflict, including voting for the Lend-Lease Program, and advocating for greater support from the United States Navy to commercial shipping.

== Retirement and death ==
In retirement, Cluett resided in Troy and Palm Beach, Florida. He died in Troy on February 5, 1954. Cluett was buried at Oakwood Cemetery in Troy.

== Family ==
In October 1899, Cluett married Margaret Robertson Gorham (1877–1943) of Buffalo, New York. They were the parents of three sons and three daughters—John, William, Gorham, Margaret (Mrs. Page Chapman), Ann ("Nancy") (Mrs. Nelson M. Burroughs), and Jean.

Cluett married Catharine Haven ReQua in 1946; she was the widow of diplomat Stewart Johnson.

Party political offices
Preceded by Alanson B. Houghton	Republican nominee for U.S. Senate from New York (Class 3); 1934	Succeeded by Bruce F. Barton
U.S. House of Representatives
Preceded by William D. Thomas	Member of the U.S. House of Representatives from New York's 29th congressional district 1937–1943	Succeeded by Dean P. Taylor
